= Gawler Bypass =

Freeway in South Australia

Gawler Bypass South Australia
- Coordinates: 34.592832°S 138.730490°E (North end); 34.634192°S 138.729095°E (South end)

General information
- Type: Freeway
- Length: 5.0 km (3.1 mi)
- Route number(s): A20 (2017–present)
- Former route number: A52 (2010–2017) (Evanston–Reid); National Highway A20 (1998–2010); National Highway 20 (1992–1998); National Route 20 (1955–1992) Entire route

Major junctions
- North end: Sturt Highway; Hewett, Adelaide
- Northern Expressway; Two Wells Road
- South end: Main North Road; Evanston, Adelaide

Location(s)
- Region: Barossa Light and Lower North
- Major suburbs: Evanston, Gawler West, Willaston

Highway system
- Highways in Australia; National Highway • Freeways in Australia; Highways in South Australia

Gawler Bypass is a major north–south route in the outer northern suburbs of the city of Adelaide, South Australia, connecting Main North Road to the Sturt Highway, bypassing Gawler. The route was built in 1963 in an attempt to redirect traffic on the national highway out of Gawler town centre. It has been upgraded and realigned several times since then.

== History ==
The first Gawler bypass was planned in the 1950s. It was first built as a single two-lane carriageway around the town in 1963, with at-grade intersections, and carried 3,000 vehicles per day. It ended at a tee-junction with Main North Road at the southern end, and followed an alignment that included what is now the southbound on-ramp and Brereton Road, Jack Cooper Drive over the Winckel Bridge, and Paternoster Drive to the railway bridge.

The road was rebuilt in the mid-1980s as a dual carriageway, with grade-separated intersections at the southern end in a new alignment, with new bridges over the Gawler River. At the time of approval, the bypass was carrying 7,000 vehicles per day. 300 collisions had been recorded between 1977 and 1982. It began construction at the end of 1985. Its total cost was $18 million, of which $13 million came from Federal funding.

In 2010, construction of the Northern Expressway realigned the northbound carriageway as part of creating a grade-separated intersection, with smooth traffic flow between the northern section of the bypass and both the Northern Expressway and the southern part of the bypass. As both roads lead broadly south, there is no provision to turn directly from one to the other. Road definitions also changed: the definition of Sturt Highway was lengthened a short distance west along the bypass to meet the expressway, resulting in a shortening of the bypass by a distance of 3.5km.

It was designated National Route 20, updated to National Highway 20 in 1992, and to National Highway A20 in 1998. This was changed to route A52, south of the intersection with Northern Expressway when it opened in 2010. From late 2016, the entire length was re-designated route A20. The Northern Expressway was re-designated route M2, instead of route M20. The entire bypass has an 110 km/h speed limit.

== Exits and interchanges ==
| LGA | Location | km | mi | Destinations | Notes |
|---|---|---|---|---|---|
| Light | Ward Belt–Reid–Buchfelde tripoint | 0.0 | 0.0 | Sturt Highway (A20) – Nurioopta, Renmark, Mildura, Wagga Wagga | Northern terminus of bypass, route A20 continues north along Sturt Highway |
| Light | Ward Belt–Reid–Buchfelde tripoint | 0.0 | 0.0 | Northern Expressway (M2) – Waterloo Corner, Port Adelaide, Adelaide | Northbound exit and southbound entrance only |
| Light | Reid–Buchfelde boundary | 1.5 | 0.93 | Two Wells Road (B77) – Gawler West, Two Wells | Northbound entry and southbound exit only |
| Gawler River | | 2.2 | 1.4 | Bridge over the river (bridge name unknown) | |
| Gawler | Evanston–Hillier boundary | 2.5 | 1.6 | Jack Cooper Drive – Evanston, Evanston Gardens | Southbound entry and northbound exit only |
| Gawler | Evanston–Evanston Gardens boundary | 3.7 | 2.3 | Gawler railway line | |
| Gawler | Evanston–Evanston Gardens–Evanston Park–Evanston South quadripoint | 5.0 | 3.1 | Adelaide Road (B19) – Evanston, Gawler | North-eastbound entry and south–western exit only |
| Gawler | Evanston–Evanston Gardens–Evanston Park–Evanston South quadripoint | 5.0 | 3.1 | Main North Road (A20) – Elizabeth, Gepps Cross, North Adelaide | Southern terminus of bypass, route A20 continues southwest along Main North Road |
Incomplete access; Route transition
