= Kingsford, South Australia =

Kingsford South Australia
- Coordinates: 34.544670°S 138.793440°E
- Population: 1216 (shared with other localities in the “State Suburb of Roseworthy”) (2011 census)
- Established: 1995
- Postcode(s): 5118
- Time zone: ACST (UTC+9:30)
  - Summer (DST): ACST (UTC+10:30)
- Location: 46 km (29 mi) north of Adelaide city centre
- LGA(s): Light Regional Council
- State electorate(s): Light
- Federal division(s): Barker
Mean max temp	Mean min temp	Annual rainfall
22.6 °C; 73 °F	10.0 °C; 50 °F	466.9 mm 18.4 in
Suburbs around Kingsford:
Roseworthy	Shea-Oak Log	Shea-Oak Log
Roseworthy	Kingsford	Rosedale
Gawler Belt; Hewett	Concordia	Rosedale
- Footnotes: Coordinates; Locations; Climate

Kingsford is a locality in South Australia located about 46 kilometres (29 miles) north of the Adelaide city centre. The Sturt Highway crosses the locality which is bounded by the Thiele Highway on the northwest, Roseworthy and Gomersal Roads on the north and the North Para River on the south.

Kingsford's boundaries were established in May 1995 for the "long-established name," which is derived from the “Kingsford homestead.” The principal land use in the locality is agriculture.

The Kingsford homestead survives and is listed on the South Australian Heritage Register; it is also notable as a location in the Australian television series, McLeod's Daughters. Kingsford is located within the federal Division of Barker, the state electoral district of Light and the local government area of the Light Regional Council.
