= Sturt Highway =

Australian national highway

Sturt Highway South Australia–New South Wales
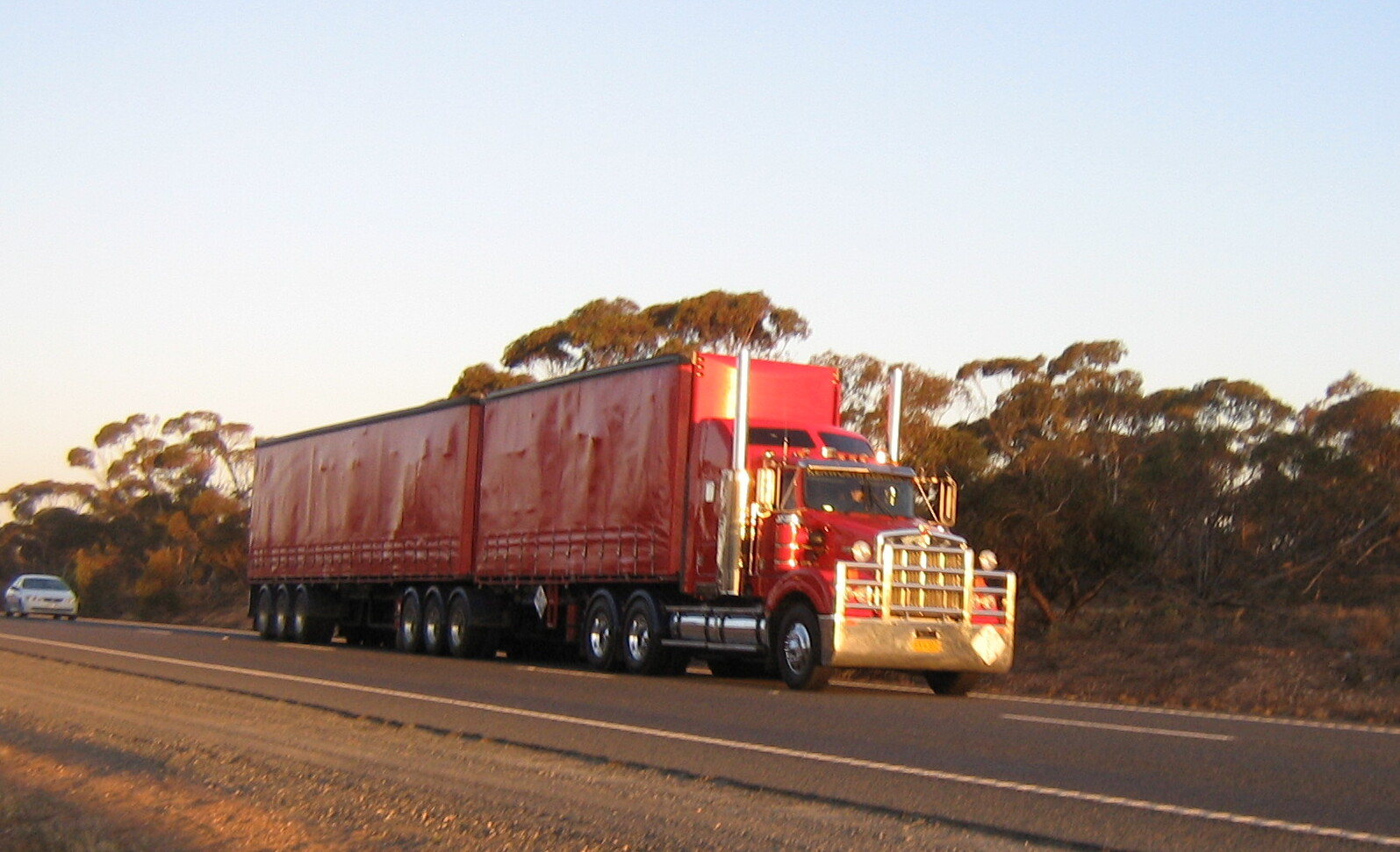
- B-double on the Sturt Highway
- Coordinates: 34.915676°S 138.622745°E (West end); 34.977201°S 138.627219°E (East end)

General information
- Type: Highway
- Length: 947 km (588 mi)
- Gazetted: August 1928 (NSW, as Main Road 58); August 1933 (NSW, as State Highway 14); July 1938 (SA); 1939 (VIC)
- Route number(s): A20 (2013/2017–present)
- Former route number: National Highway A20 (1997/1998–2013/2017) (Gawler–Vic/NSW border); National Highway 20 (1992–1997/1998) (Gawler–Vic/NSW border); National Highway 20 (1992–2013) (Vic/NSW border–Tarcutta); National Route 20 (1955–1992) Entire route

Major junctions
- West end: Gawler Bypass; Gawler, South Australia
- Northern Expressway; Barrier Highway; Barossa Valley Way; Goyder Highway; Calder Highway; Silver City Highway; Cobb Highway; Kidman Way; Newell Highway; Olympic Highway
- East end: Hume Highway; Tarcutta, New South Wales

Location(s)
- Region: Barossa Light and Lower North, Murray and Mallee, Loddon Mallee, Far West, Riverina, South Western Slopes
- Major settlements: Nuriootpa, Renmark, Mildura, Balranald, Hay, Narrandera, Wagga Wagga

Highway system
- Highways in Australia; National Highway • Freeways in Australia; Highways in South Australia; Highways in Victoria; Highways in New South Wales

The Sturt Highway is an Australian national highway in New South Wales, Victoria and South Australia. It is an important road link for the transport of passengers and freight between Sydney and Adelaide and the regions along the route.

Initially an amalgam of trunk routes, the Sturt Highway was proclaimed a state highway in NSW in 1933. In 1955, the route was allocated a National Route number (20). It was included in the National Highway system in 1992, forming the Sydney-Adelaide Link. Sturt Highway is allocated as route A20 for its entire length, the majority of which is a single carriageway, and freeway standard and 6-lane arterial road standard towards its western terminus in Gawler.

== Route ==
The highway is the shortest, highest-standard route between Sydney and Adelaide. It runs generally east–west, roughly aligned to the southern bank of the Murrumbidgee River in New South Wales. Following that river's confluence with the Murray River, it is then roughly aligned to the Murray through north-western Victoria and eastern South Australia, before it heads towards the northern outskirts of Adelaide.

The eastern terminus of Sturt Highway is at a junction with Hume Highway at Tarcutta, near Gundagai. Heading west, the highway passes through the city of Wagga Wagga and the towns of Narrandera, Darlington Point, Hay, Balranald, and Euston, leaving New South Wales by crossing the Murray River into Victoria from Buronga to Mildura. The highway continues more or less due west through the northwest of Victoria before entering South Australia. In South Australia, Sturt Highway passes Renmark, Monash, Barmera, Waikerie, Blanchetown and Nuriootpa, before reaching its western terminus at the interchange with Gawler Bypass and Northern Expressway on the outskirts of Gawler.

== History ==
The route now known as Sturt Highway originated from stock routes cut across southern New South Wales through the 19th century: overlanders would travel from Sydney's Main South Road (now Hume Highway) to Albury, and follow along the southern bank of the Murray River to Adelaide. Edward John Eyre, the English explorer, travelled from Limestone Plains (now Canberra) to Adelaide via this route in 1837, as did Charles Sturt in 1838. Eyre on his second run to South Australia headed west, following the northern bank of the Murrumbidgee River instead, crossing it at its junction with the Murray close to Boundary Bend, and travelled to Adelaide from there. The road pioneered by Eyre in 1839 left Hume Highway at Gundagai and followed the northern bank of the Murrumbidgee through the sites of Wagga Wagga, Narrandera, Hay and Balranald, and the north bank of the Murray River through the sites of Euston and Wentworth, passing north of Lake Victoria to the border with South Australia and onwards to Renmark. By 1852 a mail service by horseback operated from Wagga Wagga as far west as Balranald.

The route used by coaches between Wagga Wagga and the South Australian border as late as 1914 ran along the northern bank of the Murrumbidgee to Darlington Point – a bridge was built across the river in 1905, replacing a punt service operating from 1886 – and then continued along the river's southern bank to Hay, crossing the river again (a bridge in Hay was opened in 1874 by Henry Parkes, replacing a ferry service operating since the 1850s). The route then travelled the northern side of the Murrumbidgee through Maude and Balranald and onwards to Adelaide. By 1919 the route from Hay had been altered to travel the river's southern bank to Maude, before departing the water course for a more-direct route to Balranald, crossing the river there by a bridge opened in 1876. By 1928, the route had shifted south of the Murrumbidgee River between Tarcutta and Narrandera.

The passing of the Main Roads Act of 1924 through the Parliament of New South Wales provided for the declaration of Main Roads, roads partially funded by the State government through the Main Roads Board. Main Road No. 4 was declared along this road from the intersection with Hume Highway from Lower Tarcutta to Wagga Wagga (and continuing eastwards via Tumut, Adaminaby, Cooma, and Bega to Tathra) as part of the Monaro Highway, Main Road No. 6 was declared from Balranald via Euston and Wentworth to the state border with South Australia (and continuing eastwards via Oxley, Booligal, Gunbar, Rankins Springs, Wyalong and Cowra to Bathurst) as part of the Mid-Western Highway, and Main Road No. 58 was declared from Hay via Narranderra to Wagga Wagga (and continuing westwards via Maude to Oxley), on the same day, 8 August 1928. With the passing of the Main Roads (Amendment) Act of 1929 to provide for additional declarations of State Highways and Trunk Roads, these were amended to State Highways 4 and 6 and Trunk Road 58 on 8 April 1929.

Mid-Western Highway was rerouted between Gunbar and Balranald to pass through Hay, and the western end of Trunk Road 58 was truncated to meet it at Hay, on 24 September 1929. The route of the main road from Narrandera to Darlington Point had shifted to the southern side of the river at this stage, thus following the present route east from Balranald. On 16 September 1930, the road between Wagga Wagga and Hay (Trunk Road 58) was named Sturt Trunk Road, in honour of Captain Charles Sturt who explored the area a century earlier and opened it up for agriculture.

The Department of Main Roads, which had succeeded the MRB in the previous year, declared the Sturt Highway as State Highway 14 on 8 August 1933, from the intersection with Hume Highway at Lower Tarcutta via Wagga Wagga, Hay, Balranald, Euston and Wentworth to the state border with South Australia, subsuming the existing portions of Monaro Highway (State Highway 4) between Wagga Wagga and Lower Tarcutta, Sturt Trunk Road (Trunk Road 58) from Wagga Wagga to Hay, and Mid-Western Highway (State Highway 6) from Hay to the state border with South Australia. eventually to Adelaide via Renmark; the western end of Monaro Highway (today Snowy Mountains Highway) was truncated to meet Hume Highway in Tarcutta, and the western end of Mid-Western Highway was truncated to meet Sturt Highway in Hay, as a result. On 1 July 1938, the South Australian government decreed "the road from Gawler through Blanchetown to the border beyond Renmark will be known as the Sturt Highway", to join with the same road in New South Wales.

In 1939, Sturt Highway was rerouted to run via Mildura, using the former alignment of Murray Valley Highway, to make it the most direct route to Adelaide. Murray Valley Highway had been constructed in 1927 to provide a shorter, all-weather road connection between Mildura and Renmark, and was declared a State Highway by the Country Roads Board of Victoria in September 1932.

Sturt Highway was signed National Route 20 across its entire length in 1955. The Whitlam government introduced the federal National Roads Act 1974, where roads declared as a National Highway were still the responsibility of the states for road construction and maintenance, but were fully compensated by the Federal government for money spent on approved projects. As an important interstate link between the capitals of New South Wales and South Australia, Sturt Highway was declared a National Highway in 1992. With all three states' conversion to their newer alphanumeric systems between the late 1990s to the early 2010s, its former route number was updated to A20 for the highway within Victoria (in 1997), South Australia (in 1998), and eventually the New South Wales section (in 2013).

The final section of the highway was sealed in 1962 in New South Wales.

The passing of the Roads Act of 1993 through the Parliament of New South Wales updated road classifications and the way they could be declared within New South Wales. Under this act, Sturt Highway today retains its declaration as Highway 14, from the intersection with Hume Highway north of Tarcutta to the bridge over the Murray River at Mildura.

The passing of the Road Management Act 2004 through the Parliament of Victoria granted the responsibility of overall management and development of Victoria's major arterial roads to VicRoads: in 2004, VicRoads re-declared Sturt Highway (Arterial #6610) from the border with South Australia at Murray-Sunset to the border with New South Wales in Mildura.

== Upgrades ==
=== South Australia ===
None of the Sturt Highway was originally constructed as dual-carriageway. Work began in January 2007 to upgrade the highway to a four-lane, dual-carriageway road between Gawler Bypass and Greenock in the Barossa Valley. The project was completed in 2010 with budget savings directed towards further Sturt Highway improvements.

Northern Expressway was built at the south-western end of Sturt Highway, as part of an AusLink/Government of South Australia project to build a new freeway-standard road, as part of the North–South Corridor project, providing better access for road transport to Port Adelaide and the industrial areas west and northwest of Adelaide.

Other projects in South Australia include a number of overtaking lanes added in the 2000s and 2010s to help make it safer with the high volume of traffic. Major 'S'-bend curves near Waikerie were realigned, and further upgrades to the road were performed up to 2012.

==== Significant route changes ====
The original route of Sturt Highway in the Riverland passing through Berri and Glossop was bypassed to pass through Monash in 1995. The former alignment is now known as the Old Sturt Highway, route B201. The original route passed through the middle of the Barossa Valley, along what is now the Barossa Valley Way. This first changed to a route passing to the north of Nuriootpa, around to the north and west of Gawler on the Gawler Bypass and Main North Road to Gepps Cross. It later changed to use the Northern Expressway instead. A realignment in the 1990s led to it bypassing Daveyston and Shea-Oak Log instead of passing through these small towns.

When the Northern Expressway and Northern Connector were assigned as route M2, route A20 reverted to following Main North Road south to Gepps Cross.

==== Truro bypass ====
A new alignment is proposed to be built to the north of the town of Truro, to remove the highway traffic from the main street of the town. The bypass is proposed to be funded by the Australian government for $161.6 million and state government $40.4 million. Construction is expected to start late in 2022 and be completed by the end of 2026. The project will adjust the alignment to reduce the steep hill between the Murray Flats and Truro. It will be built to a standard suitable for triple road trains.

=== Victoria ===
There is a proposed Mildura Truck Bypass, to be funded by Auslink 2.

== Major river crossings ==
From east to west, the Sturt Highway follows much of the course of the Murrumbidgee River, on its southern banks, from the Sturt's eastern terminus with the Hume Motorway. At Balranald, the Sturt Highway crosses the Murrumbidgee, carrying the highway to the north of the river via the Balranald Bridge.

To the west and south-west, Sturt Highway crosses the Murray four times:

- Between Buronga and Mildura, carrying the highway to the south of the Murray over the George Chaffey Bridge, a high concrete-girder bridge that was opened in 1985.
- Between Paringa and Renmark, carrying the highway to the north of the Murray over the Paringa Bridge, a lift-span bridge which used to have a railway through the middle as well as vehicle carriageways on each side.
- Between Cobdogla and Kingston On Murray, carrying the highway to the south of the Murray over the Kingston Bridge, a high bridge from an embankment on the right bank to the cliffs on the left bank.
- At Blanchetown, carrying the highway from east to west over the Murray, as the river flows south, over the Blanchetown Bridge, another high bridge to cliffs on the river's western bank.

The bridge at Blanchetown was originally opened in 1964. It replaced cable ferries, and was itself replaced in 1998 in response to concern about its ability to continue to carry B-double trucks. The bridge at Kingston On Murray was opened in 1973, also replacing a very busy ferry crossing.

== Major intersections ==
State	LGA	Location	km	mi	Destinations	Notes
South Australia	Light	Gawler Belt–Ward Belt boundary	0.0	0.0	Gawler Bypass (A20) - Elizabeth, Gepps Cross	Western terminus of highway, route A20 continues southwest along Gawler Bypass
South Australia	Light	Gawler Belt–Ward Belt boundary	0.0	0.0	Northern Expressway (M2) - Waterloo Corner, Wingfield, Adelaide	Westbound entrance to and eastbound exit from Northern Expressway only
South Australia	Light	Gawler Belt–Reid–Willaston tripoint	0.2	0.12	Morgan railway line	
South Australia	Light	Gawler Belt–Reid boundary	1.4	0.87	Weyland Road - Gawler, Mallala, Balaklava	Westbound entry and exit only
South Australia	Light	Gawler Belt–Reid boundary	2.0	1.2	Redbanks Road - Gawler, Mallala, Balaklava	Eastbound entry and exit only
South Australia	Light	Gawler Belt–Hewett boundary	2.9	1.8	Horrocks Highway (B82) - Tarlee, Clare, to Thiele Highway (B81) - Freeling, Kapunda	
South Australia	Light	Greenock	23	14	Greenock Road - Greenock, Kapunda	
South Australia	Light	Nuriootpa	31	19	Barossa Valley Way (B19) - Tanunda, Lyndoch	
South Australia	Mid Murray	Truro	42	26	Truro Road - Kapunda	
South Australia	Mid Murray	Truro	44	27	Eudunda Road - Eudunda	
South Australia	Mid Murray	Annadale	65	40	Halfway House Road - Sedan, Mannum	Heavy vehicle detour to South Eastern Freeway via Murray Bridge (D1)
South Australia	Murray River		91	57	Blanchetown Bridge	
South Australia	Loxton Waikerie	Paisley	92	57	Hunter Road - Swan Reach, Mannum	
South Australia	Loxton Waikerie	Waikerie	129	80	Old Waikerie Road - Waikerie	
South Australia	Loxton Waikerie	Kingston On Murray	166	103	Kingston Road – Loxton	
South Australia	River Murray		168	104	Kingston Bridge	
South Australia	Berri Barmera	Barmera	179	111	Old Sturt Highway (B201) – Berri	
South Australia	Berri Barmera	Monash	185	115	Goyder Highway (B64) – Morgan, Crystal Brook	
South Australia	Berri Barmera	Monash	194	121	Old Sturt Highway (B201) – Berri	
South Australia	River Murray		211	131	Paringa Bridge	
South Australia	Renmark Paringa	Pike River	222	138	Stanitzki Road – Loxton, Murray Bridge	
State border			234	145	South Australia – Victoria state border	
Victoria	Mildura	Neds Corner	268	167	Meringur North Road - Meringur	
Victoria	Mildura	Mildura	343	213	Seventeenth Street (Calder Highway) (A79 north) - Merbein, Wentworth, Broken Hill	Concurrency with route A79
Victoria	Mildura	Mildura	345	214	Fifteenth Street (Calder Highway) (A79 south) - Ouyen, Bendigo, Melbourne	Concurrency with route A79
Victoria	Mildura	Mildura	347	216	Eleventh Street (C256)- Merbein, Mildura	
Victoria	Mildura	Mildura	348	216	Mildura railway line	
Victoria	Mildura	Mildura	349	217	Seventh Street (C255) – Irymple	
State border			351	218	Victoria – New South Wales state border	
New South Wales	Murray River		353	219	George Chaffey Bridge	
New South Wales	Wentworth	Buronga	352	219	Silver City Highway (B79) Wentworth, Broken Hill	
New South Wales	Balranald	Euston	431	268	Murray Valley Highway - Robinvale, Swan Hill	
New South Wales	Murrumbidgee River		509	316	Balranald Bridge	
New South Wales	Balranald	Balranald	510	320	Ivanhoe Road – Ivanhoe	
New South Wales	Balranald	Balranald	511	318	Yanga Way - Tooleybuc, to Mallee Highway (B12) - Ouyen, Adelaide	
New South Wales	Hay	Maude	583	362	Maude Road - Maude, Moulamein	
New South Wales	Hay	Hay	638	396	Cobb Highway (B75) - Wilcannia, Echuca, to Mid-Western Highway (B64) - West Wyalong, Cowra	Roundabout
New South Wales	Murrumbidgee	Darlington Point	752	467	Kidman Way (B87) - Griffith, Cobar, Jerilderie	
New South Wales	Narrandera	Narrandera	807	501	Tocumwal railway line	
New South Wales	Narrandera	Narrandera	808	502	Newell Highway (A39 south) - Jerilderie	Concurrency with route A39
New South Wales	Narrandera	Narrandera	809	503	Newell Highway (A39 north) - West Wyalong, Parkes, Dubbo	Concurrency with route A39
New South Wales	Wagga Wagga	Wagga Wagga	899	559	Olympic Highway (A41 south) - Albury	Concurrency with route A41
New South Wales	Wagga Wagga	Wagga Wagga	902	560	Olympic Highway (A41 north) - Junee	Concurrency with route A41
New South Wales	Wagga Wagga	Wagga Wagga	904	562	Main Southern railway line	
New South Wales	Wagga Wagga	Tarcutta	947	588	Hume Motorway (M31) - Albury, Sydney, Canberra	Eastern terminus of highway and route A20
Concurrency terminus; Incomplete access; Route transition

== Towns on Sturt Highway ==
South Australia

- Gawler
- Nuriootpa
- Truro
- Blanchetown
- Waikerie
- Kingston on Murray
- Barmera
- Renmark
- Paringa
- Yamba

Victoria

- Cullulleraine
- Merbein South
- Mildura

New South Wales

- Buronga
- Euston
- Balranald
- Hay
- Darlington Point
- Narrandera
- Wagga Wagga
- Forest Hill

== Gallery ==
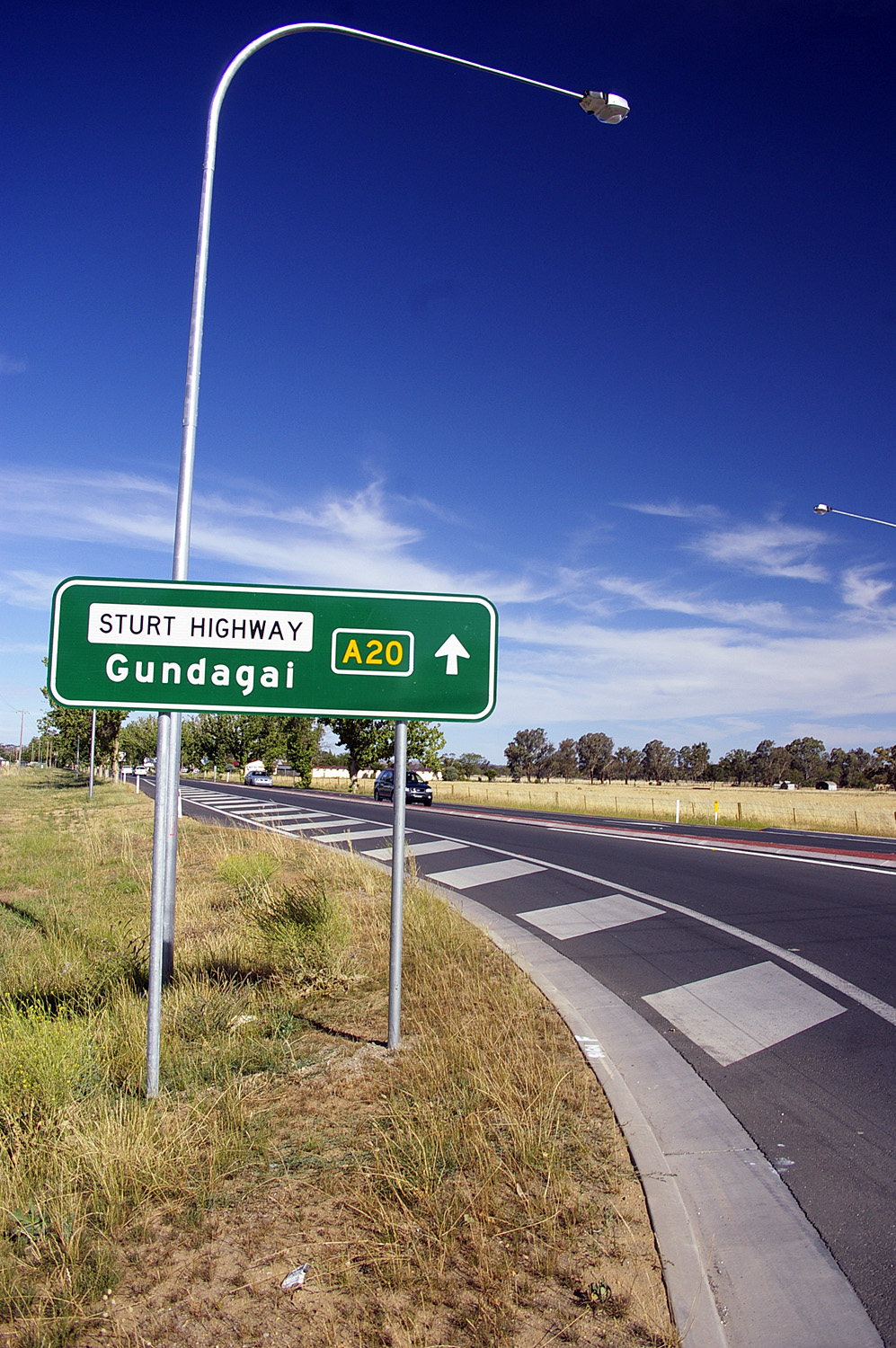
Sturt Highway marked as A20 near Gumly Gumly

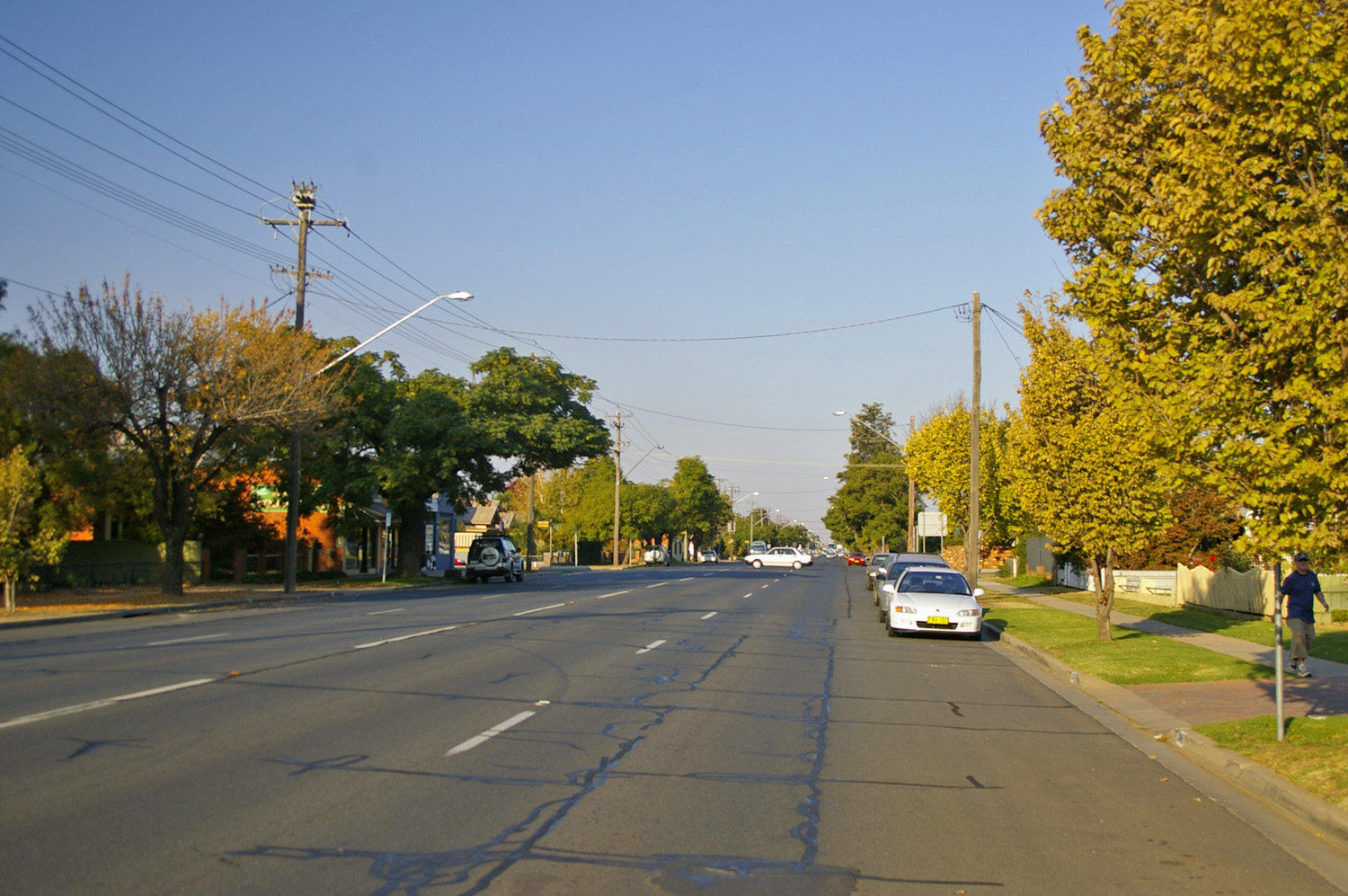
Sturt Highway through Wagga Wagga

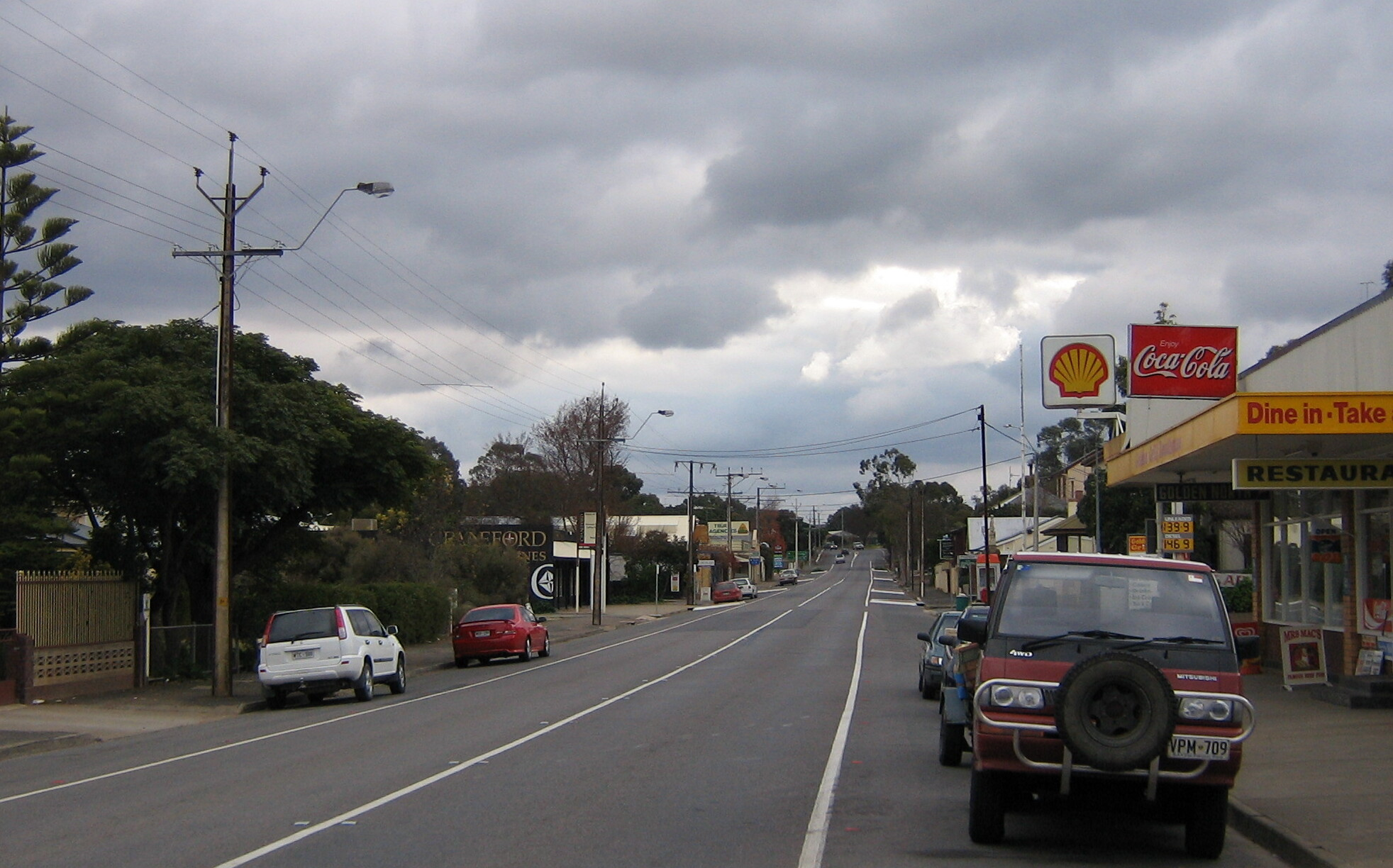
Sturt Highway through Truro

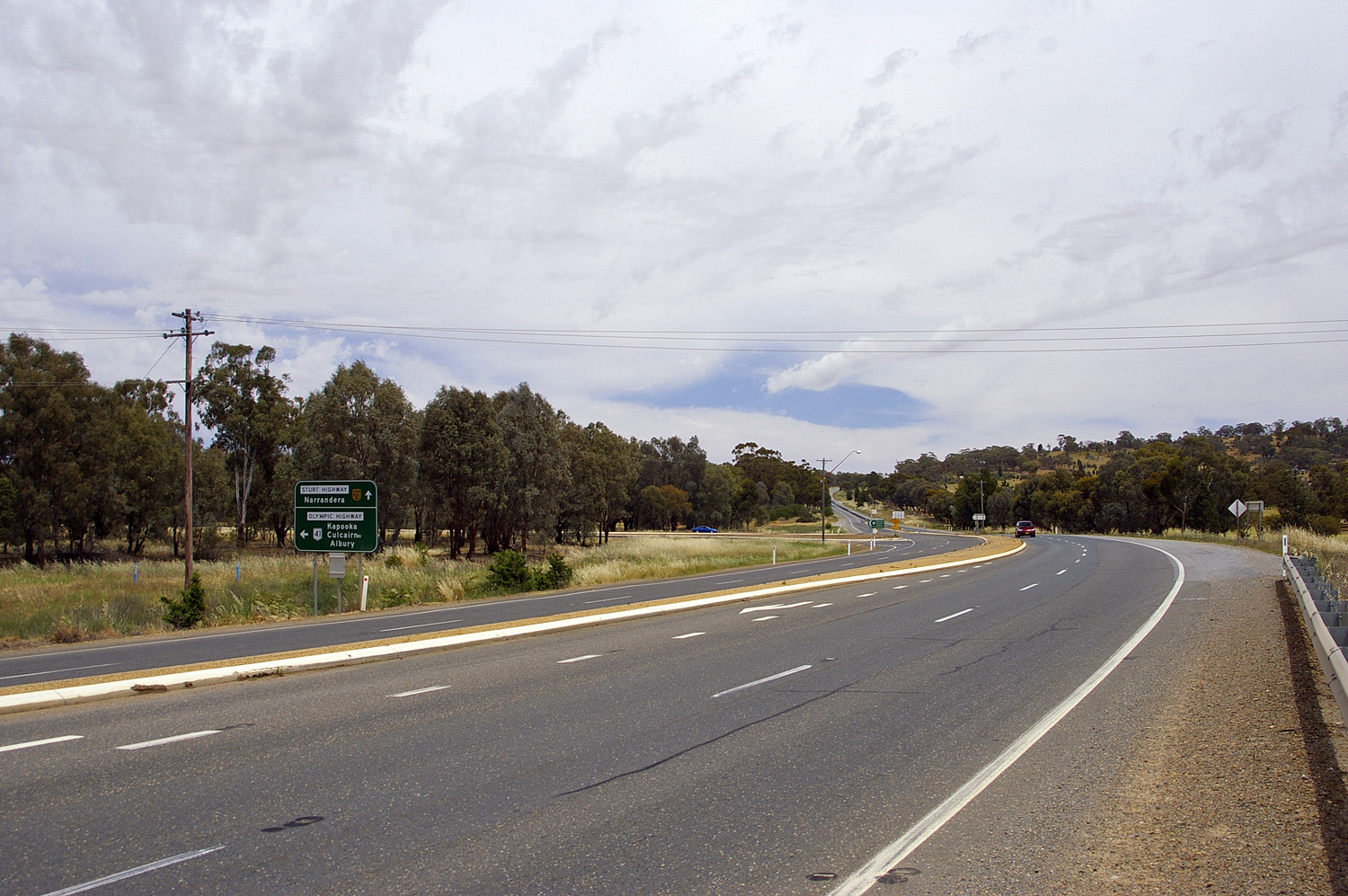
The junction of the Sturt and Olympic highways

== See also ==
- Highways in Australia
- List of highways in New South Wales
- List of highways in South Australia
- List of highways in Victoria
