= Reid, South Australia =

Reid
- Suburb
- Coordinates: 34.6°S 138.73°E
- Country: Australia
- State: South Australia
- City: Adelaide
- LGA: Town of Gawler
- Established: 18 November 2004

Government
  - Federal division: Spence

Population
  - Total: 436 (SAL 2021)
- Postcode: 5118
Suburbs around Reid
	Gawler Belt	Willaston
Ward Belt	Reid	Gawler West
Buchfelde	Hillier	Evanston

Reid is a northern suburb of Adelaide, South Australia in the Town of Gawler. It is a sliver of land bounded by the Gawler bypass road, the Gawler River, and the Gawler-Roseworthy railway line.

Reid was excised from Gawler West in 2004 in response to a petition by residents who felt that a different name would make it easier to find their area. It is named after a Mr Reid who was an early landholder in the area.
