= Gawler West, South Australia =

Gawler West
- Suburb
- Coordinates: 34.6037°S 138.73404°E
- Country: Australia
- State: South Australia
- City: Adelaide
- LGA: Town of Gawler

Government
  - State electorate: Light
  - Federal division: Spence

Population
  - Total: 975 (SAL 2021)
- Postcode: 5118
Suburbs around Gawler West
Reid	Willaston	Gawler
Buchfelde	Gawler West	Gawler South
Hillier	Evanston

Gawler West, (postcode 5118) is a suburb of the South Australian town of Gawler, located in the northern Adelaide metropolitan area region, 43 km north of Adelaide. It is bordered by the Gawler River and the Gawler railway line and the suburbs of Gawler South, and Evanston. During the 2000s period, part of the suburb was renamed Reid by the South Australian Geographical Names Advisory Committee, replacing the Gawler Bypass Road as the western boundary by the Gawler River on the west and north.

== History ==
Gawler West is a subdivision of the Gawler township. In the post World War II era, suburban infill allowed the suburb to develop. The initial development of the suburb was a Housing Trust subdivision.

== The suburb today ==
A new subdivision during the 2000s was started on the river flat, adjacent to the Gawler Bypass.

== Governance ==
Gawler West is governed at the local level by the Town of Gawler. Gawler West lies in the state electoral district of Light and the federal electoral division of Spence.

== See also ==
- Gawler
