= Gawler River, South Australia =

Gawler River South Australia
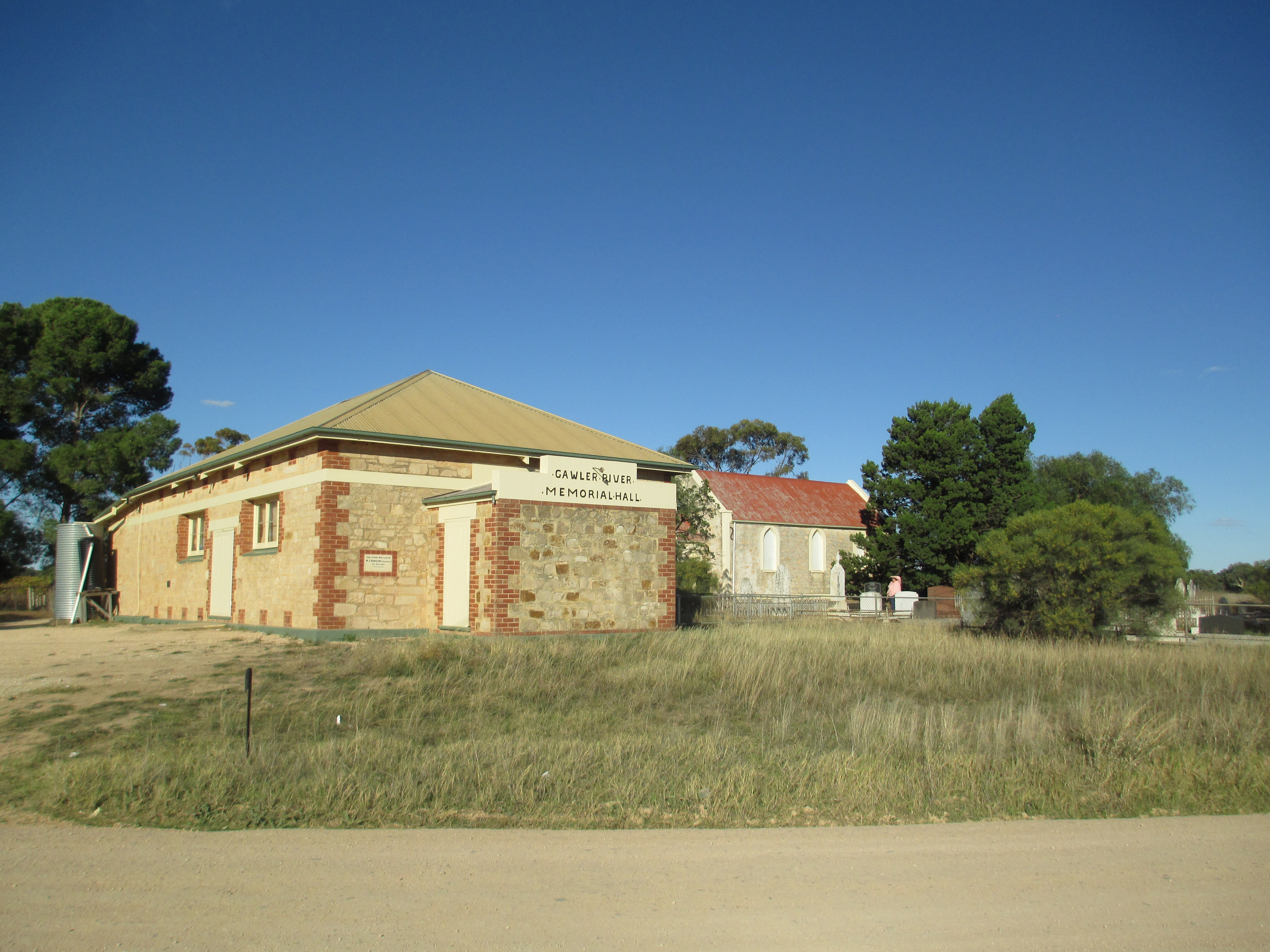
- Gawler River Hall, church and cemetery

- Coordinates: 34°36′52″S 138°39′23″E
- Population: 104 (SAL 2021)
- Postcode(s): 5118
- Location: 10 km (6 mi) W of Gawler, South Australia
- LGA(s): Light Regional Council
- State electorate(s): Light
- Federal division(s): Grey; Spence
Localities around Gawler River:
Reeves Plains	Ward Belt	Ward Belt
Lewiston	Gawler River	Buchfelde
Penfield Gardens	Angle Vale	Hillier

Gawler River is a locality and former small town on the north bank of the Gawler River, west of the town of Gawler in South Australia. The Dawkins family (of whom M. B. Dawkins MLC was a member) established extensive farms in the early 19th century. The Dawkins' Newbold Stud is credited with being first to develop the Poll Dorset breed of sheep, which is one of Australia's most important sheep meat breeds.

The Gawler River church, originally named "Stone Hill" was built in 1854, one of the earliest stone churches in the Gawler area.

Gawler River Memorial Hall was erected in 1951, adjacent to the Methodist Church and cemetery.

The "Gawler River campus" of Trinity College, Gawler is actually in Angle Vale.
