= Gawler Belt, South Australia =

Gawler Belt
- Town
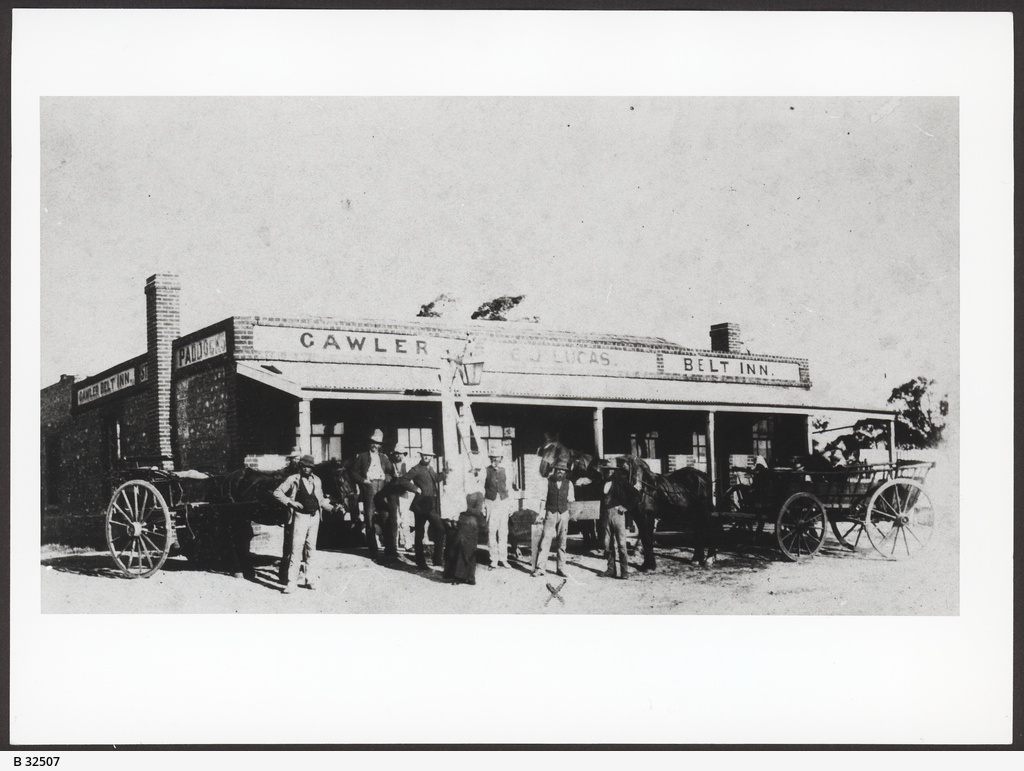
- Gawler Belt Inn in 1880

- Coordinates: 34.6°S 138.7°E
- Country: Australia
- State: South Australia
- LGA: Light Regional Council
- Location: 4 km (2.5 mi) NW of Gawler

Government
  - State electorate: Ngadjuri
  - Federal division: Spence

Population
  - Total: 1,000 (SAL 2021)
- Postcode: 5118
Localities around Gawler Belt
Kangaroo Flat	Roseworthy	Kingsford
Ward Belt	Gawler Belt	Hewett
Buchfelde	Reid	Willaston

Gawler Belt is a locality to the northwest of Gawler in South Australia. The area is predominantly rural in character, although most of the area now consists of allotments too small to farm profitably, so it is essentially a rural and industrial suburb of Gawler.

Gawler Belt is bounded on its southeast side by the Gawler bypass road and Sturt Highway. It is crossed by the now-unused Roseworthy railway line, but there has never been a station in Gawler Belt. The Gawler Belt Inn stood approximately where the Redbanks Road interchange on the Gawler Bypass is now, however the hotel was closed well before the bypass was built. The Inn operated from 1857 until 1913.

Xavier College has a campus at Gawler Belt.
