= National Highway (Australia) =

Highway system in Australia

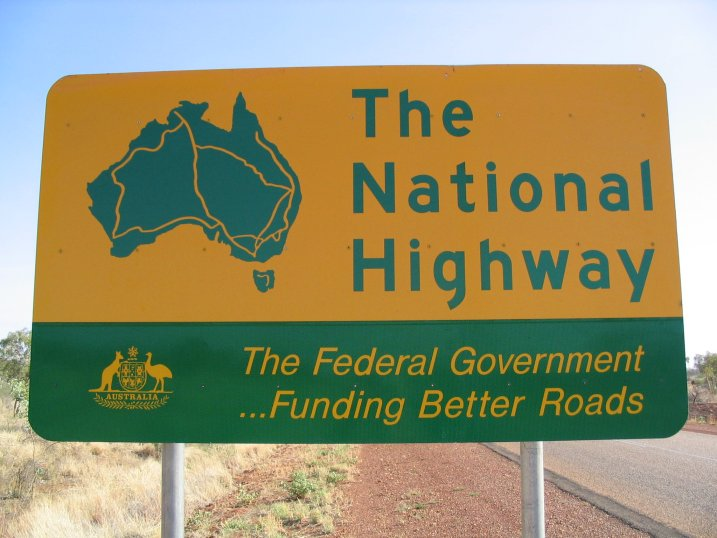
Road sign of the National Highway.

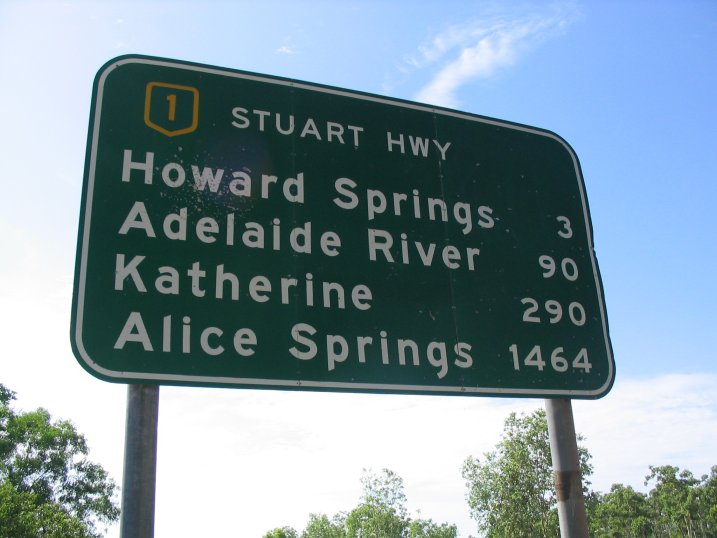
National Highway Sign located on the Stuart Highway near Darwin, listing distances to key locations on this highway.

Map of the National Highway System

The National Highway (part of the National Land Transport Network) is a system of roads connecting all mainland states and territories of Australia, and is the major network of highways and motorways connecting Australia's capital cities and major regional centres.

== History ==
=== Legislation ===
National funding for roads began in the 1920s, with the federal government contributing to major roads managed by the state and territory governments. However, the Federal Government did not completely fund any roads until 1974, when the Whitlam government introduced the National Roads Act 1974. Under the act, the states were still responsible for road construction and maintenance, but were fully compensated for money spent on approved projects.

In 1977, the 1974 Act was replaced by the State Grants (Roads) Act 1977, which contained similar provisions for the definition of "National Highways".

In 1988, the National Highway became redefined under the Australian Land Transport Development (ALTD) Act 1988, which had various amendments up to 2003. The 1988 Act was largely concerned with funding road development in cooperation with the state governments. The federal transport minister defined the components of the National Highway, and also a category of "Road of National Importance" (RONI), with federal funding implications. Section 10.5 of the Act required the state road authorities to place frequent, prominent, signs on the National Highways and RONI projects funded by the federal government.

In 2005, the National Highway became the National Land Transport Network, under the AusLink (National Land Transport) Act 2005. The criteria for inclusion in the network was similar to the previous legislation, but expanded to include connections to major commercial centres, and inter-modal facilities. All of the roads included in National Land Transport Network as of 2005 were formally defined by regulation in October 2005. The Minister for Transport may alter the list of roads included in the network. Three amendments to the scheduled list of roads have been made, in February 2007, September 2008 and February 2009. The third variation, published in February 2009, is current as of September 2012.

Under AusLink a program that operated between July 2004 and 2009, the AusLink National Network had additional links, both road and rail. The Federal Government encouraged funding from state, territory and local governments and public–private partnerships to upgrade the network and requires state government funding contributions on parts of the network, especially for new links. For example, the Pacific Highway and the Calder Highway are part of the National Network, yet new projects are being funded 50/50 by federal and state governments. State contributions (generally 20%) are required on some sections of the old network near major cities.

=== Roads and routes ===
The various superseded Acts defined National Highways as roads, or a series of connected roads, that were the primary connection between two State or Territory capital cities, as well as between Brisbane and Cairns, and between Hobart and Burnie. The term "Sea Highway" is sometimes used colloquially to describe the sea lines of communication between the state of Victoria on the Australian mainland and island state of Tasmania across the Bass Strait.

The 16,000 kilometres (9,900 mi) of roads included in the original National Highway system had large variations in road quality. Some sections were no more than dirt tracks, whilst others were four lane dual carriageways. While 12,496 kilometres (7,765 mi) was sealed, there was also 3,807 kilometres (2,366 mi) worth of gravel roads. The National Highway was gradually improved, with the sealed proportion increased from 73 per cent in the early 1970s to 88 per cent by 1981. The sealing works were completed in 1989.

Since 2005, National Highways were no longer defined in federal legislation. However, the routes were marked with a National Highway route marker up until 2013. These markers have "NATIONAL" printed in the upper portion of the shield, above the highway's number. The shield, text and number are coloured yellow while the background is dark green – the national colours of Australia. In 2014, the route makers retained the national colours, although the word "NATIONAL" was removed in the Australian Capital Territory, New South Wales, and parts of both Queensland and Victoria.

National Highway numbering originates from the earlier national route network. Many of the routes that are now National Highways with the signature green and gold shields, continue beyond the official National Highway as the black and white shielded national routes. Certain stretches of the National Highways have "A" and "M" tag on their shields; particularly those in Victoria and South Australia. They have completely revised their route numbering, basing it on the British M, A, B, C classifications. These states have retained the original National Highway numbering and shield decal, having added the appropriate M and A classification.

== List of roads on the National Land Transport Network ==
- Sydney to Melbourne – Hume Motorway/Hume Highway/Hume Freeway
- Sydney to Brisbane – the Pacific Motorway (Sydney–Newcastle), New England and Cunningham Highways route and the Pacific Highway route
- Brisbane to Cairns – Bruce Highway
- Brisbane to Darwin – Warrego, Landsborough, Barkly and Stuart Highways
- Brisbane to Melbourne – Warrego, Gore, Newell and Goulburn Valley Highways and Hume Freeway
- Melbourne to Adelaide – Western Freeway, Western Highway, Dukes Highway and South Eastern Freeway
- Adelaide to Darwin – Port Wakefield Road, Augusta Highway and Stuart Highway
- Adelaide to Sydney – Sturt and Hume Highway/Hume Motorway
- Adelaide to Perth – Port Wakefield Road, Augusta Highway, Eyre, Coolgardie-Esperance (part) and Great Eastern Highways
- Perth to Darwin – Great Northern, Victoria and Stuart Highways
- Sydney to Canberra – Hume Motorway/Hume Highway and Federal Highway
- Melbourne to Canberra – Hume Freeway/Hume Highway and Barton Highway
- Hobart to Burnie including the link from Launceston to Bell Bay – Brooker, Midlands and the Bass Highway
- Townsville to Mount Isa – Flinders Highway
- Melbourne to Sale – Princes Highway
- Perth to Bunbury – South Western Highway
- Melbourne to Mildura – Calder Highway
- Sydney to Dubbo – Great Western and Mitchell Highways
- Sydney to Wollongong – Princes Motorway and Princes Highway
- Melbourne to Geelong – Princes Highway
- some urban links in Sydney, Melbourne, Brisbane, Perth and Adelaide, connecting the long distance links to each other and to ports and airports.

== Former National Highway routes ==
The following roads were part of the original National Highway network. Most are still signposted with National Highway route markers. In 2013, New South Wales introduced a new alphanumeric route numbering system, which no longer includes national highways.

Route	Former route	Road name	Destinations	Distance (km)
Canberra to Sydney:
A23	National Highway 23	Federal Highway	Canberra to ACT/NSW border	73
M23	National Highway 23	Federal Highway	NSW/ACT border to Yarra	73
M31	National Highway 31	Hume Highway/Hume Motorway	Yarra to Sydney	187
260 kilometres
Canberra to Melbourne:
A25	National Highway 25	Barton Highway	Canberra to ACT/NSW border	52
A25	National Highway 25	Barton Highway	NSW/ACT border to Yass	52
M31	National Highway 31	Hume Highway	Yass to Albury	294
M31	National Highway (M)31	Hume Freeway	Wodonga to Melbourne (Thomastown)	290
M80	National Highway M80	Western Ring Road	Melbourne	15
651 kilometres
Sydney to Melbourne:
M31	National Highway 31	Hume Motorway/Hume Highway	Sydney to Albury	539
M31	National Highway (M)31	Hume Freeway	Wodonga to Melbourne (Thomastown)	290
M80	National Highway M80	Western Ring Road	Melbourne	15
844 kilometres
Sydney to Adelaide:
M31	National Highway 31	Hume Motorway/Hume Highway	Sydney to Tarcutta	392
A20	National Highway 20	Sturt Highway	Tarcutta to Buronga	597
A20	National Highway (A)20	Sturt Highway	Mildura to Hewett	370
A20	National Highway (A)20	Gawler Bypass	Hewett to Willaston	3
M2	National Highway M20	Northern Expressway	Willaston to Waterloo Corner	23
A1	National Highway (A)1	Port Wakefield Road	Waterloo Corner to Adelaide	13
1,403 kilometres
Sydney to Brisbane:
M1	National Highway 1	Pacific Motorway	Sydney to Newcastle	127
A43	National Highway 15	New England Highway	Newcastle to Belford	581
A15	National Highway 15	New England Highway	Belford to Wallangarra	581
National Highway (A)15		New England Highway	Wallangarra to Warwick	95
National Highway (A)15		Cunningham Highway	Warwick to Yamato	127
M15	National Highway 15	Cunningham Highway	Yamanto to Riverview	127
M2	National Highway 15	Ipswich Motorway	Riverview to Wacol	14
M7	National Highway 15	Ipswich Motorway	Wacol to Brisbane	14
944 kilometres
Melbourne to Brisbane:
M80	National Highway M80	Western Ring Road	Melbourne	15
M31	National Highway (M)31	Hume Freeway	Melbourne (Thomastown) to Seymour	75
M39	National Highway (M)39	Goulburn Valley Freeway	Seymour to Shepparton	59
A39	National Highway (A)39	Goulburn Valley Highway	Shepparton to Tocumwal	110
A39	National Highway 39	Newell Highway	Tocumwal to Goondiwindi	1062
A39	National Highway (A)39	Leichhardt Highway	Goondiwindi to North Goondiwindi	21
A39	National Highway 85/A39	Gore Highway	North Goondiwindi to Toowoomba	202
A2	National Highway 54/A2	Warrego Highway	Toowoomba to Brassall	97
M2	National Highway 54/A2	Warrego Highway	Brassall to Ipswich	97
M2	National Highway 15	Ipswich Motorway	Ipswich to Wacol	14
M7	National Highway 15	Ipswich Motorway	Wacol to Brisbane	14
1,655 kilometres
Melbourne to Adelaide:
M80	National Highway M80	Western Ring Road	Melbourne	15
M8	National Highway (M)8	Western Freeway	Melbourne (Deer Park) to Ballarat	115
A8	National Highway (A)8	Western Highway	Ballarat to VIC/SA border	314
A8	National Highway (A)8	Dukes Highway	SA/VIC border to Tailem Bend	189
A1	National Highway (A)1	Princes Highway	Tailem Bend to Murray Bridge	25
M1	National Highway (M)1	South Eastern Freeway	Murray Bridge to Adelaide	74
719 kilometres
Adelaide to Darwin:
A1	National Highway (A)1	Main North Road	Adelaide to Gepps Cross	tba
A1	National Highway (A)1	Port Wakefield Road	Gepps Cross to Waterloo Corner	tba
A1	National Highway (A)1	Port Wakefield Highway	Waterloo Corner to Port Wakefield	tba
A1	National Highway (A)1	Augusta Highway	Port Wakefield to Port Augusta	tba
A87	National Highway (A)87	Stuart Highway	Port Augusta to SA/NT border	tba
National Highway 87		Stuart Highway	NT/SA border to Daly Waters	tba
National Highway 1		Stuart Highway	Daly Waters to Darwin	tba
3,035 kilometres
Perth to Adelaide:
National Highway 94		Great Eastern Highway	Perth to Redcliffe	tba
National Highway 94		Great Eastern Highway Bypass	Redcliffe to Hazelmere	tba
National Highway 94		Roe Highway	Hazelmere to Midvale	tba
National Highway 94		Great Eastern Highway	Midvale to Coolgardie	tba
National Highway 94		Coolgardie–Esperance Highway	Coolgardie to Norseman	tba
National Highway 1		Eyre Highway	Norseman to WA/SA border	tba
A1	National Highway (A)1	Eyre Highway	SA/WA border to Port Augusta	tba
A1	National Highway (A)1	Augusta Highway	Port Augusta to Port Wakefield	tba
A1	National Highway (A)1	Port Wakefield Highway	Port Wakefield to Waterloo Corner	tba
A1	National Highway (A)1	Port Wakefield Road	Waterloo Corner to Gepps Cross	tba
A1	National Highway (A)1	Main North Road	Gepps Cross to Adelaide	tba
2,700 kilometres
Perth to Darwin:
National Highway 95		Roe Highway	Midvale (Perth) to Middle Swan (Perth)	
National Highway 95		Great Northern Highway	Middle Swan (Perth) to Port Hedland	
National Highway 1		Great Northern Highway	Port Hedland to Wyndham	
National Highway 1		Victoria Highway	Wyndham to Katherine	
National Highway 1		Stuart Highway	Katherine to Darwin	
Brisbane to Darwin:
M7	National Highway 15	Ipswich Motorway	Brisbane to Wacol	14
M2	National Highway 15	Ipswich Motorway	Wacol to Riverview	14
M2	National Highway 54/A2	Warrego Highway	Riverview to Brassall	
A2	National Highway 54/A2	Warrego Highway	Riverview to Morven	
A2	National Highway 71/A2	Landsborough Highway	Morven to Barcaldine	
A2	National Highway 66/A2	Landsborough Highway	Barcaldine to Camooweal	
A2	National Highway 66/A2	Barkly Highway	Cloncurry to Camooweal	
National Highway 66		Barkly Highway	Camooweal to Tennant Creek	
National Highway 87		Stuart Highway	Tennant Creek to Daly Waters	
National Highway 1		Stuart Highway	Daly Waters to Darwin	
Brisbane to Cairns:
M1	National Highway (M)1	Bruce Highway	Brisbane to Kybong	
A1	National Highway (A)1	Bruce Highway	Kybong to Cairns	
Hobart to Burnie:
National Highway 1		Brooker Highway	Hobart to Granton	17
National Highway 1		Midland Highway	Granton to Launceston	177
National Highway 1		Bass Highway	Launceston to Burnie	142
336 kilometres

== History of changes to Australia's National Highway network ==
Australia's National Highway Network has had a number of changes since the National Roads Act 1974 was originally established in 1974. The 1974 Act empowered the Federal Minister for Transport to declare as a National Highway, any existing or proposed road in a State, which (in the Minister's opinion), was the main route between two State capitals; a State capital and Canberra; a State capital and Darwin; Brisbane and Cairns; Hobart and Burnie; or any other road which, in the Minister's opinion, was important enough to be a National Highway.

Subsequent replacement legislation in 1977, 1988, and 2005, along with other intervening amendments, contained similar provisions. Notably, important roads to near-metropolitan locations such as Geelong, Bunbury and Wollongong were added in 2005, although not within the original concept of interstate National Highways.

=== Original routes included in 1974 ===
The original components of the National Highway were officially declared on 20 September 1974, as "links" and terminated at the edge of each capital city. The parts of the routes within the major urban areas were not defined as National Highways, and the Sturt and Newell highway routes were not included in the original 1974 network. In June 1995, as a condition of federal funding, the National Highway route in New South Wales was required to remove existing tolling on the former F3 and former F6 inter-urban freeways, even though the former F6 did not become part of a National Highway until 2005.

The Sydney to Adelaide route via the Hume and Sturt highways, and the Melbourne to Brisbane route via the Newell Highway, were added as links of the National Highway network in November 1992 under the 1988 Act, however the decision to use the route from Goondiwindi to Brisbane via the Gore Highway and Toowoomba, rather than the Cunningham Highway (via Warwick), was not finalized until October 1993. These were the only two major routes added to the National Highway network between 1974 and 2005. In addition, the urban ends of intercity routes, and some link roads and ring roads joining national routes, were explicitly added to the National Highway network for the first time.

As sections of existing highways were upgraded or replaced by nearby parallel routes of a new higher standard, the "National Highway" designation was usually moved onto the new part of the route. The principal route between Sydney and Newcastle was shifted from the old Pacific Highway onto the new Sydney-Newcastle freeway in nine separate stages between 1966 and 1999 as the freeway was progressively implemented. Similar changes were made as the Hume Highway was re-developed.

=== Routes included in the National Land Transport Network for the first time under the 2005 legislation ===
Appendix 1 of the 'Auslink (National Land Transport) Bill' of 2004, listed the routes which were proposed to be included in 'The Auslink National Network'. The listing included here distinguished between the components of the "former National Highway system", and the additional routes to be added to the Auslink National Network after the implementation of the new Act, which occurred in 2005. All of the existing routes of the National Highway prior to 2005 were included in the new network. The routes added with the inception of the 2005 Act (as described in Appendix 1 referenced above, some of the descriptions are somewhat ambiguous but clarified in the ensuing regulations) are:

- the Pacific Highway route between Newcastle and Brisbane
- the route between Townsville and Mt Isa
- the route from Sydney (or Eastern Creek) to Dubbo via the M4, Great Western and Mitchell highway
- the Calder Highway route from Melbourne to Mildura via Bendigo
- the Southern Freeway and Princes Highway route from Sydney to Wollongong
- the Princes Freeway from Melbourne to Geelong
- the Monash Freeway, Princes Freeway and Princes Highway to Taralgon and Sale
- the route between Perth and Bunbury
- the route from Launceston to Bell Bay
- some additional urban connecting routes linking ports and airports and linking the national routes, and forming urban growth corridors, a complete definition of the network as of 2005 is included in the schedule of the 2005 Act

Changes to the National Land Transport Network made in 2007

- The route description for the Cumberland Highway ( Pennant Hills Road ), between the junctions with the M2 motorway and the F3 Sydney-Newcastle Freeway, was altered. Almost all of the original Cumberland Highway route from Prestons to Wahroonga, established in the 2005 network, was deleted due to the opening of the M7 motorway.

Changes to the National Land Transport Network made in 2008

- The route description of the national route consisting of part of the Princes Freeway and Princes Highway between Melbourne and Waurn Ponds (west of Geelong), was altered.
- The proposed Townsville Port Access Road was added.
- The proposed Tiger Brennan Drive extension in suburban Darwin was added.

Changes to the National Land Transport Network made in 2009

- The portion of the M4 Western Motorway in Sydney, between Eastern Creek and Strathfield was added.
- The part of the Princes Freeway, and Princes Highway, west of Melbourne which is included in the National network, was extended from Waurn Ponds to Colac.
- A section of the Great Eastern Highway and the Great Eastern Highway Bypass in suburban Perth was added.
- Alteration to the definition of the South Road route in Adelaide and addition of the access road to Adelaide Airport.
- The Townsville Ring Road was added
- The Karratha–Dampier Road and part of the North West Coastal Highway was added.
- The Bunbury Port Access Road and part of the Wilman Wadandi Highway were added.
- Part of the Hobart–Burnie route was altered.

== Urban components of the national land transport (road) network ==
In Sydney, only a subset of the network of motorways and major roads in the Sydney metropolitan area are part of the current National Land Transport (Roads) Network, the rest are not part of the national network and therefore the Federal Government does not contribute funding on the same basis. The following roads in and around Sydney are currently part of the designated National Land Transport Network

- Hume Highway from Melbourne to the junction of the M7 and M5 at Prestons, continuing on the M5 South Western Motorway to General Holmes Drive (near Kyeemagh) and then Foreshore Road to its junction with Botany Road.
- Cumberland Highway (Pennant Hills Road), between the junction with the M2 Hills Motorway at Carlingford, and the junction at the commencement of the Pacific Motorway at Wahroonga. Note: The 2005 network included a route comprising a small part of the old Hume Highway from Prestons to Liverpool, the Cumberland Highway from Liverpool to Northmead, part of James Ruse Drive, and Pennant Hills Road from North Parramatta to the Pacific Motorway junction at Wahroonga. Almost all of this route, except the connection between the M2 and Pacific motorways at the northern end, was removed from the national network in 2007, due to the opening of the M7/M2 route as an alternative.
- Pacific Motorway, north from Wahroonga.
- The whole of the Westlink M7 motorway, from its junction with the M5 at Prestons, to Seven Hills, and then the part of the M2 Hills Motorway from Seven Hills to the junction of the Cumberland Highway (Pennant Hills Road) at Carlingford.
- King Georges Road, from its connection to the Princes Highway at Blakehurst, thence Wiley Avenue, thence Roberts Road to its intersection with the Hume Highway at Greenacre (Chullora).
- The Princes Highway from its intersection with King Georges Road at Blakehurst, the Princes Motorway to its intersection with the Northern Distributor at Gwynneville (Wollongong).
- The M4 Western Motorway, between Strathfield and Emu Plains, continuing onto the Great Western Highway towards Dubbo. The portion of the M4 between Eastern Creek and Strathfield was only added in 2009.

== National highway route numbering ==
In addition to the network of federally funded National Highways defined in 1974, there was also a system of "national routes". This scheme, which predated the National Highways in 1953, was a plan to coordinate State road authorities to allocate consistent highway numbers to major highways which traversed more than one State, for the convenience of travellers. The most notable example is "Highway 1", which follows the periphery of the continent, and only parts of which form part of the former National Highway and current National Land Transport (Roads) Network.

== See also ==
- Highway 1 (Australia)
