= Kangaroo Flat, South Australia =

Kangaroo Flat
- Town
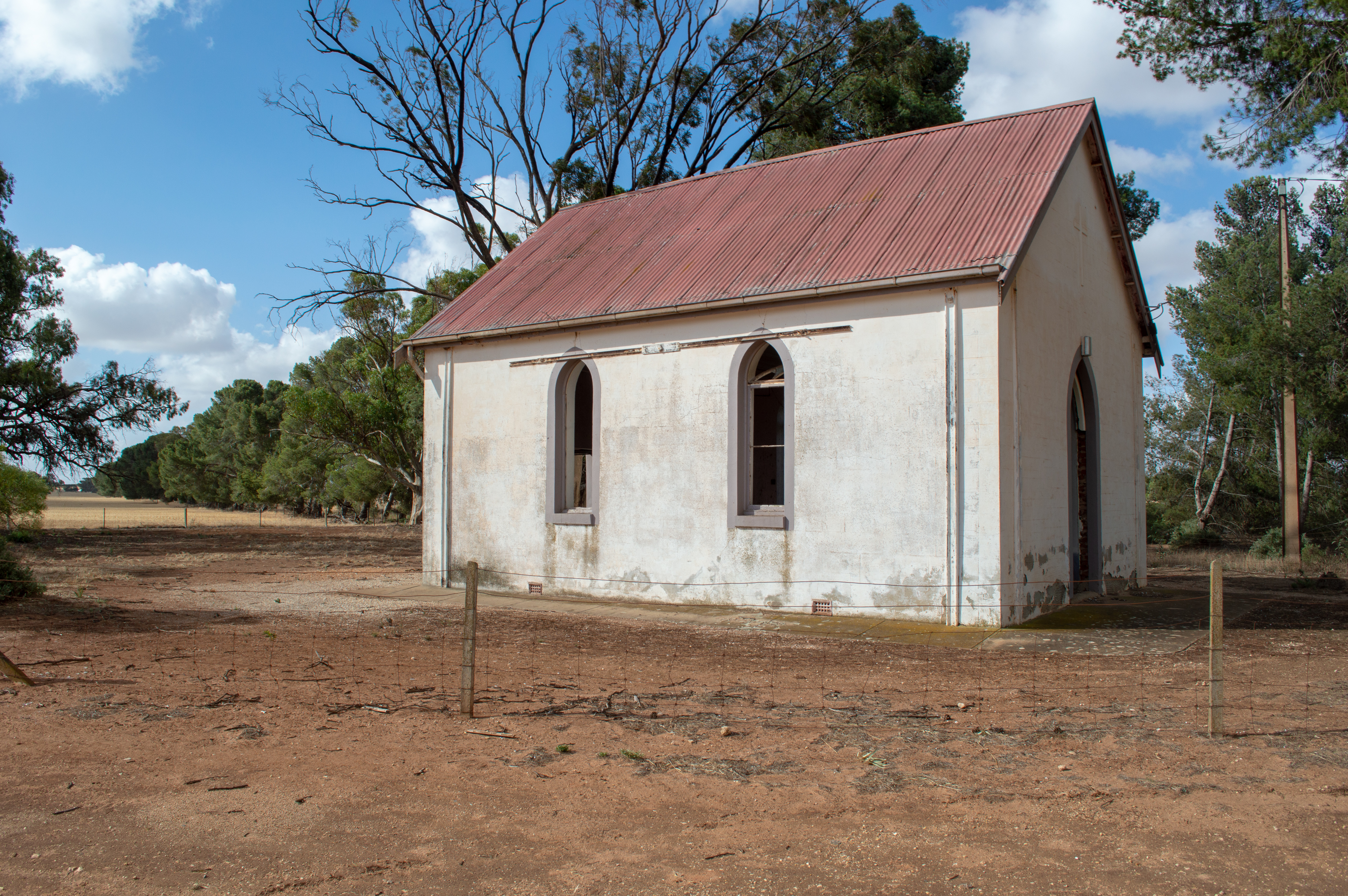
- Former Methodist Church

- Coordinates: 34.55°S 138.69°E
- Country: Australia
- State: South Australia
- LGA: Light Regional Council
- Location: 9 km (5.6 mi) NW of Gawler

Government
  - State electorate: Light
  - Federal division: Spence

Population
  - Total: 104 (SAL 2021)
- Postcode: 5118
Localities around Kangaroo Flat
| | Wasleys |
| Reeves Plains | Kangaroo Flat | Roseworthy |
| Ward Belt | | Gawler Belt |

Kangaroo Flat is a locality northwest of Gawler in South Australia. It is on the Gawler to Mallala road in the vicinity of the turnoff to Roseworthy College and Wasleys. The locality used to have a school (opened 1902), Methodist church and a debating club, but these are now closed.

== Kangaroo Flat Football Club (1946-1950) ==
In 1946, Kangaroo Flat Football Club was formed and joined the Gawler Football B Grade Association. The club colours were green and gold. In 1947, the Club won the B Grade premiership defeating the Willaston B team by 1 point.
