= Xavier College (South Australia) =

Catholic, co-educational school in Australia

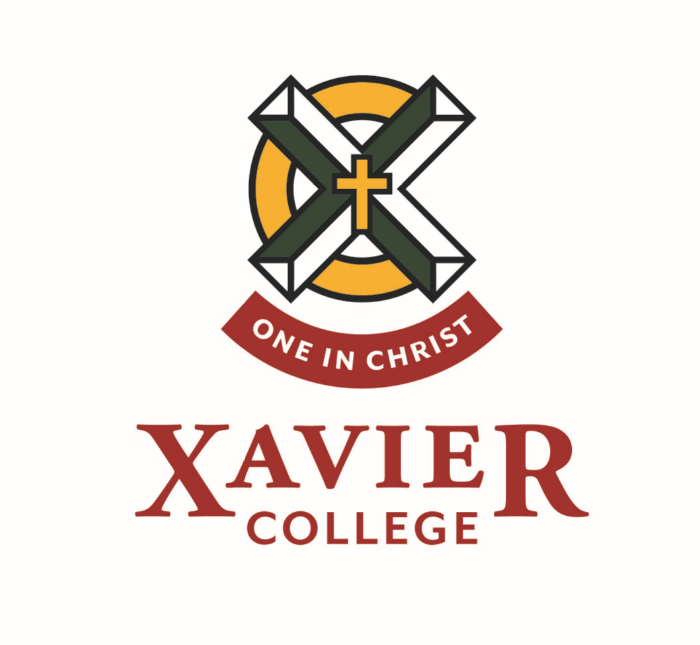
- Xavier College crest

Location
- Evanston, Gawler Belt, Riverlea Park & Two Wells, South Australia; Australia
- Coordinates: 34°34′33″S 138°44′03″E

Information
- Type: Catholic, co-educational
- Motto: One in Christ
- Religious affiliation(s): Salesians of Don Bosco
- Denomination: Roman Catholic
- Patron saint(s): Saint John Bosco
- Established: 1995; 30 years ago
- Principal: Mark Flaherty
- Years: Reception–12
- Campuses: Evanston Gawler Belt Two Wells Riverlea Park
- Website: www.xavier.catholic.edu.au

Xavier College is a Catholic co-educational college north of Adelaide, South Australia, consisting of four campuses: Evanston catering for Reception to Year 6 students, Gawler Belt for Years 7–12, Two Wells for Reception to Year 10 and which will eventually cater for Reception to Year 12 students, and Riverlea Park which opens in 2027 for Reception to Year 6, growing to Year 12 in the future. The College was founded in 1995 and operates according to the traditions of the Salesians of Don Bosco. The school enrols approximately 2,600 students across all campuses. Its patron is the priest Saint John Bosco.

== College values ==
Xavier College's core values are based on the Hebrew word for spirit, rûaħ. The word rûaħ is often used to describe the "Spirit of God". The word rûah is used as an acronym for respect, understanding, affection and humour.

== Educational activities ==
The College offers education in technology, as well as, extra-curricular activities including music, sports, swimming carnival, athletics carnival, and Xavier Day.

== Student life ==
Xavier College, operated in the Salesian tradition based on the life and example of Francis de Sales, has a pastoral care, homeroom system called an "Oratory". It is named after the small community of boys who were raised as Catholics by Saint John Bosco (known affectionately as "Don" or "father"). Bosco provided a safe haven for boys of all backgrounds, especially the abused and neglected of Turin, Italy in the 1800s. He ensured they were treated with equal love and devotion while they learnt practical skills such as carpentry and printing.

== School houses ==
The College has four houses: de Sales after St Francis de Sales (motto: Inspiring others through kindness, colour blue); Mazzarello after St Maria Mazzarello (motto: Peacefully serving others with faith and humility, colour red); Handley after the founding principal of Xavier College, Fr. Dennis Handley (1995 to 2004) (motto: Living in the spirit with passion and vision, colour green); and Occhiena after Venerable Margaret Occhiena (1788–1856), who with her son, St John Bosco, created the Salesian Preventive system of Education. Through her work at the Oratory of St Francis de Sales in Turin, Margaret became lovingly known as "Mamma" Margaret and is considered to be the mother of the Salesian family. (Motto: Nurturing faith and dreams from the heart, colour yellow.)

== Campus development ==
The original site at Gawler Belt opened in 1995, with Fr Dennis Handley being appointed Principal of the school. The College catered for secondary students from Years 8–12, until 2019 when Year 7 students were introduced to secondary school.

In February 2021, Xavier College opened a new campus at Two Wells, South Australia. Initially for Reception to Year 7 students, the Two Wells Campus now caters for Reception to Year 10 students and will cater for Year 11 students in 2026, and Year 12 in 2027.

In January 2023, St Brigid's Catholic School, Evanston amalgamated with Xavier College to become a primary school campus of Xavier College, continuing to offer places for students from Reception to Year 6. The Evanston Campus now provides a direct pathway for students completing Year 6 to commence Year 7 at the Gawler Belt Campus.

In May 2025, Xavier College Riverlea Park was announced and is set to open in January 2027. Initially catering for students in Reception to Year 6, it will grow to provide a full Reception to Year 12 pathway.

== Principals ==
- Fr Dennis Handley (1995–2004)
- Mr Lynn Martin (2004–2019)
- Mr Mark Flaherty (2020–present)
- Mr Jye Woods (1998-2013)
