= Murrumbidgee River bridge, Carrathool =

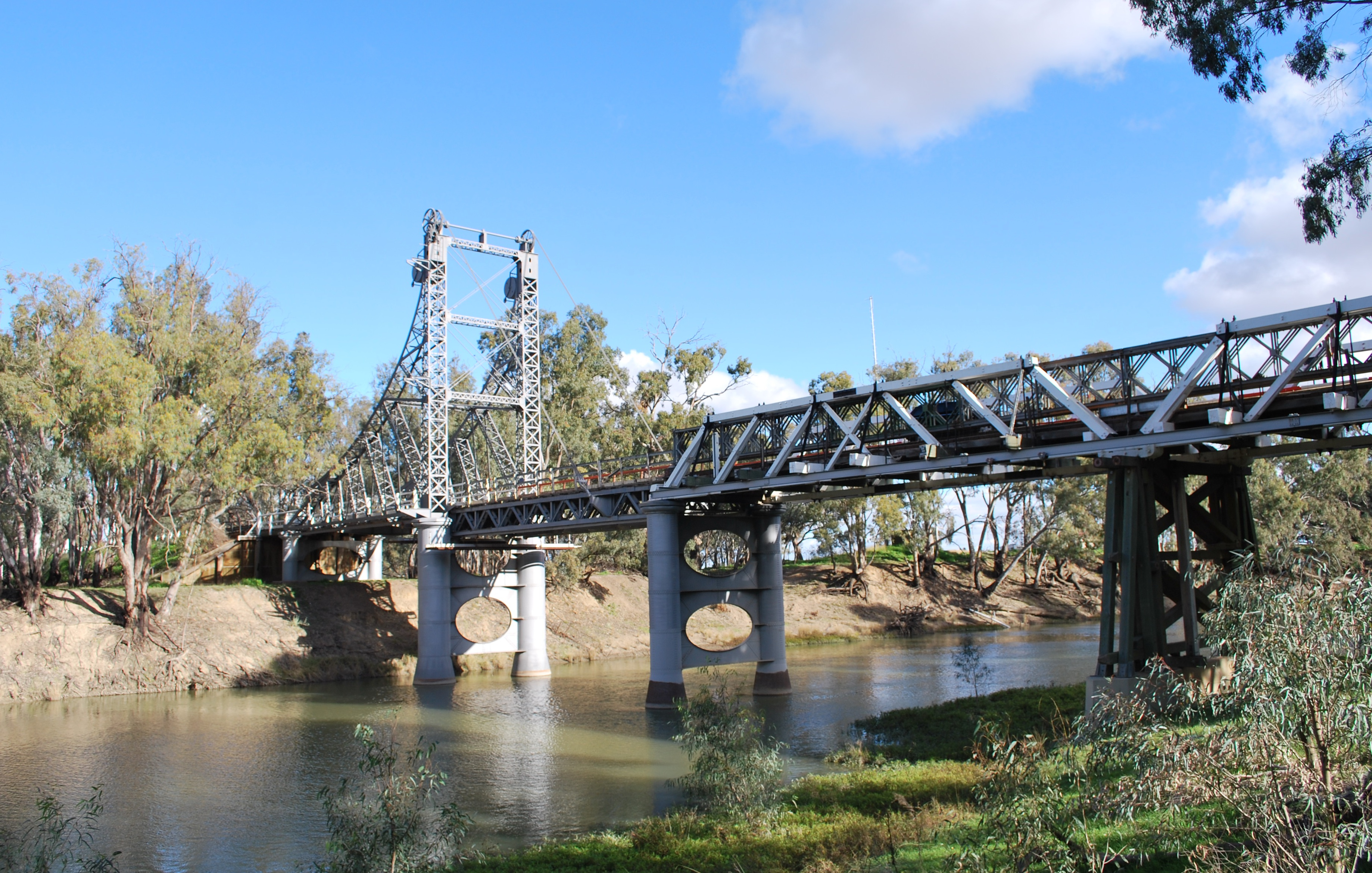
- Coordinates: 34°26′58″S 145°25′03″E
- Carries: Disused
- Crosses: Murrumbidgee River
- Locale: Carrathool, New South Wales, Australia
- Other names: Carrathool Bridge over Murrumbidgee River; Murrumbidgee River Bridge
- Owner: Transport for NSW
- Preceded by: Darlington Point Bridge
- Followed by: Hay Bridge

Characteristics
- Design: Allan truss bascule-type lift span bridge
- Material: Timber and steel
- Pier construction: Iron and timber
- Total length: 115.5 metres (379 ft)
- Width: 4.3 metres (14 ft)
- No. of lanes: One

History
- Opened: 1924
- Closed: 2019
- Replaces: Vehicular punt
- Replaced by: Merrylees Bridge

New South Wales Heritage Register
- Official name: Carrathool Bridge over Murrumbidgee River; Murrumbidgee River bridge, Carrathool
- Type: State heritage (built)
- Designated: 20 June 2000
- Reference no.: 1460
- Type: Road Bridge
- Category: Transport – Land

Location
- Interactive map of Murrumbidgee River bridge, Carrathool

The Murrumbidgee River bridge, Carrathool is a heritage-listed road bridge that, until its closure in 2019, carried Carrathool Road across the Murrumbidgee River in Carrathool, New South Wales, Australia. The bridge is owned by Transport for NSW. The bridge is also called the Carrathool Bridge over Murrumbidgee River and provides a key connection between the Sturt Highway and the Murrumbidgee Road. It was added to the New South Wales State Heritage Register on 20 June 2000.

In October 2019 the bridge was replaced by the two-lane concrete Merrylees Bridge.

== History ==
=== Allan trusses ===
Timber truss road bridges have played a significant role in the expansion and improvement of the NSW road network. Prior to the bridges being built, river crossings were often dangerous in times of rain, which caused bulk freight movement to be prohibitively expensive for most agricultural and mining produce. Only the high priced wool clip of the time was able to carry the costs and inconvenience imposed by the generally inadequate river crossings that often existed prior to the trusses construction.

Timber truss bridges were preferred by the Public Works Department from the mid 19th to the early 20th century because they were relatively cheap to construct, and used mostly local materials. The financially troubled governments of the day applied pressure to the Public Works Department to produce as much road and bridge work for as little cost as possible, using local materials. This condition effectively prohibited the use of iron and steel, as these, prior to the construction of the steel works at Newcastle in the early 20th century, had to be imported from England.

Allan trusses were the first truly scientifically engineered timber truss bridges, and incorporate American design ideas for the first time. This is a reflection of the changing mindset of the NSW people, who were slowly accepting that American ideas could be as good as or better than European ones. The high quality and low cost of the Allan truss design entrenched the dominance of timber truss bridges for NSW roads for the next 30 years.

Percy Allan, the designer of Allan truss and other bridges, was a senior engineer of the Public Works Department, and a prominent figure in late 19th century NSW.

Timber truss bridges, and timber bridges generally were so common that NSW was known to travellers as the "timber bridge state".

=== Carrathool Bridge ===
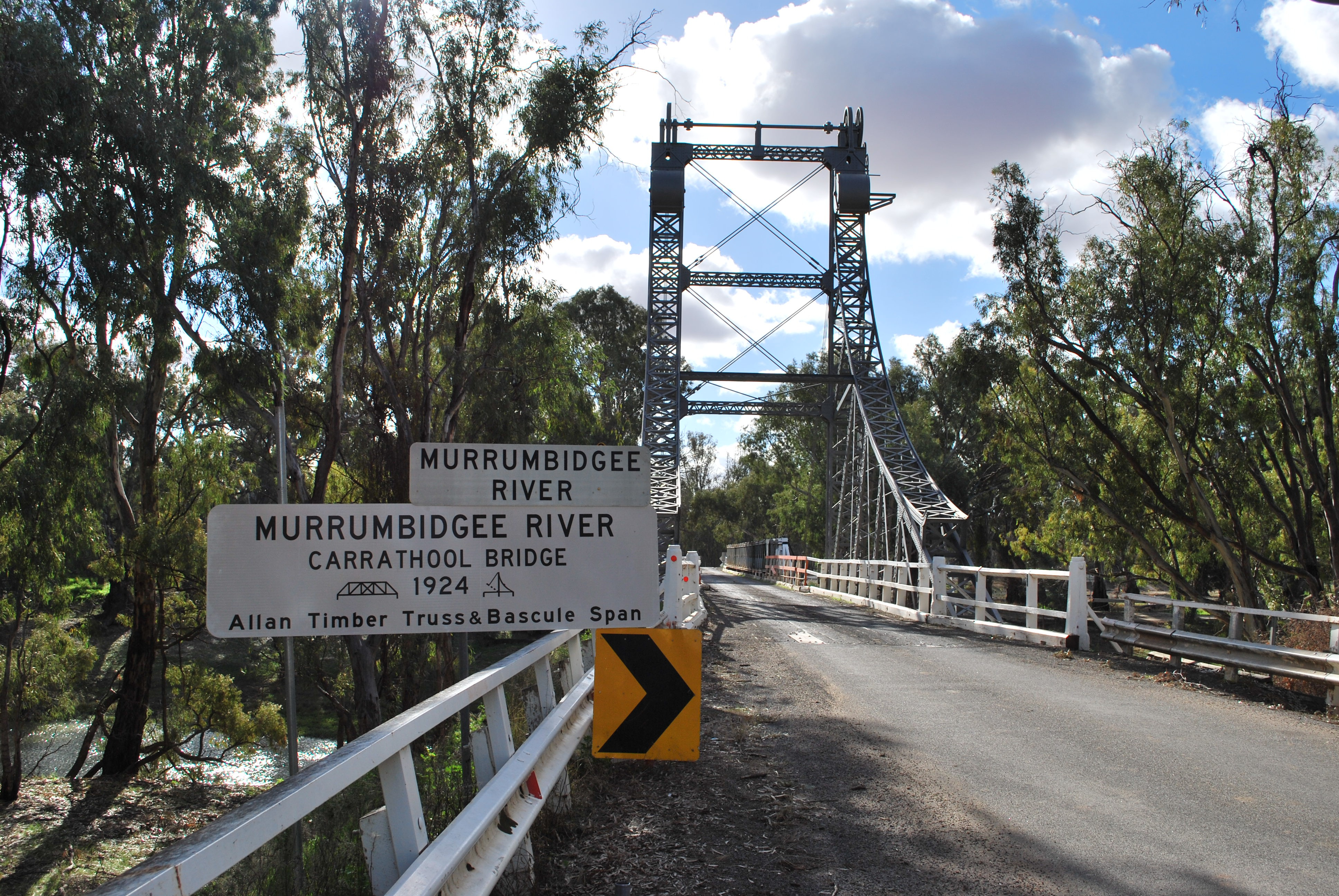
Road entering the bridge

The bridge spanning the Murrumbidgee River between Carrathool and the Sturt Highway was completed in 1924. It is an Allan-type timber truss road bridge, and has a bascule-type lift span supported on cylindrical iron piers, designed to allow river-craft to pass. Only three bascule lift span bridges remain in NSW, and the Carrathool bridge is the only one of these in a timber truss road bridge. The lift section was built by Poole and Steel.

The Carrathool bridge was constructed in response to public pressure for a bridge to replace the river vehicular punt . Funding for work was drawn partly from the local community, and partly from the Department of Public Works. The requirement that local residents pay for half the cost of the bridge "was deplored by the then Mayor of Hay, who was a vocal advocate for the rights and the development of the Riverina region".

== Description ==
Carrathool Bridge is an Allan-type timber truss single-lane road bridge with a steel lift span. It has two timber truss spans, each of 21.8 metres (72 ft). There are three timber approach spans at each end giving the bridge an overall length of 115.5 metres (379 ft).

The lift span is of the Bascule type and is supported on cylindrical twin iron piers. The timber truss spans are supported on timber trestles. The bridge provides a carriage way with a minimum width of 4.3 metres (14 ft).

A timber post and rail guard rail extends the full length of the bridge. Up until its closure in 2019, the bridge was in intact condition.

In November 2019, Roads & Maritime Services announced that the heritage-listed Carrathool Bridge would be removed from the New South Wales conservation list of bridges. Its immediate conservation future is unclear.

== Heritage listing ==
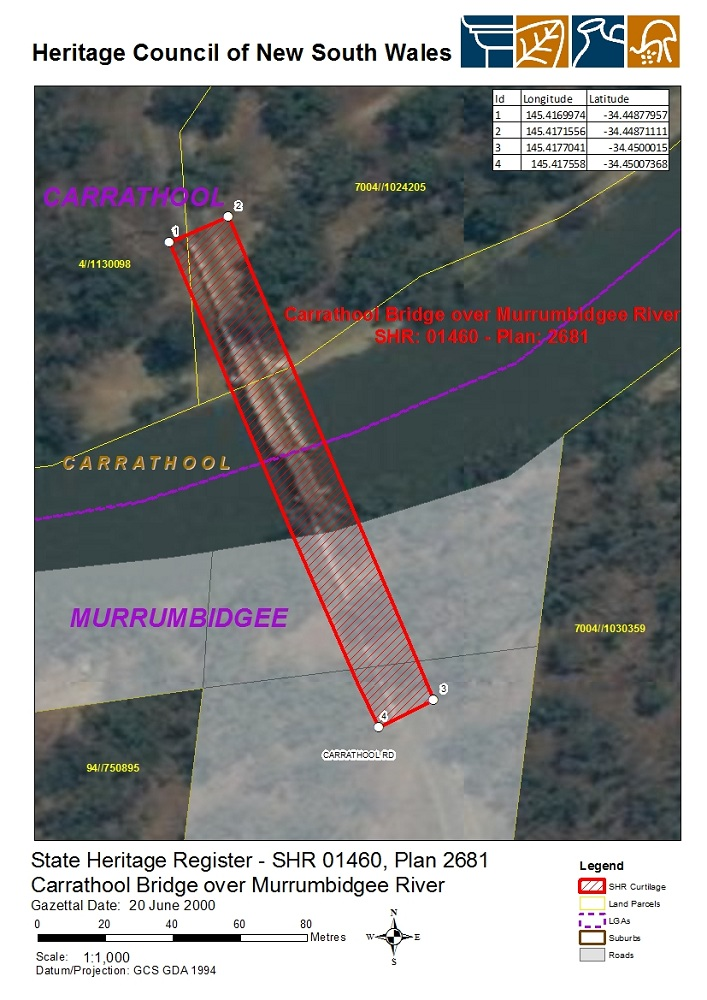
Heritage boundaries

Completed in 1922, the Carrathool bridge is an Allan-type timber truss road bridge, and has a rare Bascule type lift span to allow river craft to pass. In 1998 it was in good condition. As a timber truss road bridge, it has many associational links with important historical events, trends, and people, including the expansion of the road network and economic activity throughout NSW, and Percy Allan, the designer of this type of truss. Allan trusses were third in the five-stage design evolution of NSW timber truss bridges, and were a major improvement over the McDonald trusses which preceded them. Allan trusses were 20% cheaper to build than McDonald trusses, could carry 50% more load, and were easier to maintain. The Bascule lift span is a rare feature, and has associational links with the historic river trade, and has much to reveal about late 19th century civil engineering and manufacturing technology. In 1998 there were 38 surviving Allan trusses in NSW of the 105 built, and 82 timber truss road bridges survive from the over 400 built. The Carrathool bridge is a representative example of Allan timber truss road bridges, and is assessed as being State significant, primarily on the basis of its technical and historical significance.

Carrathool Bridge over Murrumbidgee River was listed on the New South Wales State Heritage Register on 20 June 2000 having satisfied the following criteria.

The place has a strong or special association with a person, or group of persons, of importance of cultural or natural history of New South Wales's history.

Through the bridge's association with the expansion of the NSW road network, its ability to demonstrate historically important concepts such as the gradual acceptance of NSW people of American design ideas, and its association with Percy Allan, it has historical significance.

The place is important in demonstrating aesthetic characteristics and/or a high degree of creative or technical achievement in New South Wales.

The Bascule lift span is a distinctive visual feature, embodying the spirit of late 19th-century aesthetics. Further, its function can be clearly seen, and shows unambiguously the innovation which went into its design. The bridge exhibits the technical excellence of its design, as all of the structural detail is clearly visible. In the context of its landscape it is visually attractive. As such, the bridge has substantial aesthetic significance.

The place has strong or special association with a particular community or cultural group in New South Wales for social, cultural or spiritual reasons.

Timber truss bridges are prominent to road travellers, and NSW has in the past been referred to as the "timber truss bridge state". Through this, the complete set of bridges gain some social significance, as they could be said to be held in reasonable esteem by many travellers in NSW.

The place has potential to yield information that will contribute to an understanding of the cultural or natural history of New South Wales.

The bridge is highly technically significant because it is an example of an Allan truss, and is representative of some major technical developments that were made in timber truss design by the Public Works Department. The Bascule lift span is a rare feature, and has associational links with the historic river trade, and has much to reveal about late 19th century civil engineering and manufacturing technology.

The place possesses uncommon, rare or endangered aspects of the cultural or natural history of New South Wales.

In 1998 there were 38 surviving Allan trusses in NSW of the 105 built, and 82 timber truss road bridges survive from over 400 built. 3 bascule lift span bridges survive in NSW, and the Carrathool bridge is the only one in a timber truss road bridge.

The place is important in demonstrating the principal characteristics of a class of cultural or natural places/environments in New South Wales.

The bridge is representative of Allan truss bridges.

== See also ==
- List of bridges in Australia
