= Thiele Highway =

Road in South Australia, Australia

Thiele Highway South Australia
- Coordinates: 34.566571°S 138.746343°E (Southwest end); 34.029013°S 139.672060°E (Northeast end)

General information
- Type: Highway
- Length: 116 km (72 mi)
- Route number(s): B81 (1998–present)

Major junctions
- Southwest end: Main North Road; Gawler Belt, South Australia
- Curio Road; Worlds End Highway
- Northeast end: Goyder Highway; Morgan, South Australia

Location(s)
- Region: Yorke and Mid North
- Major settlements: Freeling, Kapunda, Eudunda

Highway system
- Highways in Australia; National Highway • Freeways in Australia; Highways in South Australia

Thiele Highway is a road in South Australia connecting the outskirts of Adelaide to the north-west bend of the River Murray at Morgan, South Australia. It is named after author Colin Thiele (/ˈtiːli/ TEE-lee), who lived most of his life in towns along the route and set some of his stories in the area.

Thiele Highway branches from Horrocks Highway at Gawler Belt on the outskirts of Gawler, north of Adelaide. It goes north-east through undulating cropping country to skirt the east side of Freeling and continues to cross the Light River and enter the former mining town of Kapunda. It crosses the Light River again mid-way between Kapunda and Eudunda. It continues east-north-east from Eudunda down into the Murray Valley and across the plains past a number of small rural local service centres to Morgan, where it meets the River Murray and Goyder Highway. Most of the route is close to the former Morgan railway line.

== Major intersections ==
LGA	Location	km	mi	Destinations	Notes
Light	Gawler Belt	0	0.0	Horrocks Highway (B82) – Gawler	South western terminus of highway and route B81
Light	Freeling	14	8.7	Templers Road (west) – Templers; Daveyston Road – Daveyston	
Light	Kapunda	27	17	Greenock Road – Greenock	
Light	Kapunda	31	19	Tarlee Road (west) – Tarlee; Marrabel Road (north) – Marrabel	
Light	Kapunda	33	21	Truro Road – Truro	
Goyder	Eudunda	56	35	Curio Road (B84) – Marrabel, Saddleworth	
Goyder	Eudunda	57	35	Worlds End Highway – Robertstown, Burra	
Goyder	Eudunda	60	37	Truro–Eudunda Road – Truro	
Mid Murray	Morgan	116	72	Goyder Highway (B64) – Burra, Renmark	North eastern terminus of highway and route B81
1.000 mi = 1.609 km; 1.000 km = 0.621 mi: Route transition
