= Willaston, South Australia =

Willaston
- Suburb
- Coordinates: 34.591°S 138.744°E
- Country: Australia
- State: South Australia
- City: Adelaide
- LGA: Town of Gawler
- Location: 39 km (24 mi) NE of Adelaide CBD
- Established: c. 1850

Government
  - State electorate: Light
  - Federal division: Spence

Population
  - Total: 3,458 (SAL 2021)
- Postcode: 5118
Suburbs around Willaston
Gawler Belt	Gawler Belt	Hewett
Buchfelde	Willaston	Hewett
Gawler West	Gawler	Gawler East

Willaston is a northern suburb 39 kilometres (24 mi) northeast of the Adelaide city centre in South Australia. It is located in the Town of Gawler.

== History ==
William Paxton and Samuel Stocks obtained land in the area in 1848 and 1849. After Stocks died in 1850, Paxton laid out the village called Willaston. The village may have been named after Willaston in Cheshire, due to a probable association with the Stocks family.

Willaston Post Office opened on 1 November 1864.

== Demographics ==
The 2011 Census by the Australian Bureau of Statistics counted 3,294 persons in Willaston on census night. Of these, 47% were male and 53% were female.

The majority of residents (77.4%) are of Australian birth, with an additional 11.3% declaring England as their country of birth.

The average age of Willaston residents is similar to that of the greater Australian population. 67.2% of residents were over 25 years in 2006, compared to the Australian average of 66.5%; and 32.8% were younger than 25 years, compared to the Australian average of 33.5%.

== Attractions ==
The Willaston Football Club, formed in 1889 and known as the Donnybrooks, plays in the Barossa Light & Gawler Football Association.

Gawler Par 3 Golf Course is located on the southern edge of Willaston.

The Willaston General Cemetery is in the north of the suburb, alongside the retirement village.

=== Parks ===
Elliot Goodger Memorial Park is located between Gawler River Road and Kelly Road. Clonlea Park is located on Murray Road along the banks of the North Para River.

== Transportation ==
=== Roads ===
Willaston lies beside the Sturt Highway (Gawler Bypass) and the southern end of the Horrocks Highway. Willaston is also serviced by Main North Road, linking the suburb to Gawler.

=== Public transport ===
The nearest train station is Gawler Central.

A part of the western boundary in bordered by the disused Roseworthy railway line.

== Notable people ==
Notable people from or who have lived in Willaston include:

- Job Harris, operated Willaston Stores, and operated the first Post Office

== See also ==
- List of Adelaide suburbs
