= Buchfelde, South Australia =

Buchfelde
- Town
- Coordinates: 34.613°S 138.697°E
- Country: Australia
- State: South Australia
- City: Adelaide
- LGA: Light Regional Council

Government
  - State electorate: Ngadjuri
  - Federal division: Spence

Population
  - Total: 193 (SAL 2021)
- Postcode: 5118
Localities around Buchfelde
Ward Belt	Ward Belt	Reid
Gawler River	Buchfelde	Gawler West
Angle Vale	Hillier	Evanston

Buchfelde (German: [ˈbuːxˌfɛldə] BOOCH-fel-duh), formerly known as Loos, is now a suburb of Gawler, South Australia, on the northern outskirts of Adelaide in South Australia.

== History ==
A property in the area was settled in 1848 by Dr. Richard von Schomburgk and his brother Otto, and is named after their financial benefactor Leopold von Buch who helped them flee Germany. The name was changed from Buchfelde to Loos in 1918 after a town in France which was the site of a battle in 1915. This was to remove a "name of enemy origin". The name returned to Buchfelde in November 1990.

== Geography ==
The modern boundaries of the suburb were set in June 2011 after the construction of the Northern Expressway. They are the Gawler River on the south, Northern Expressway on the west and north, and Gawler Bypass Road on the east, with the Two Wells Road through the middle. It contains the northern end of the Stuart O'Grady Bikeway which runs adjacent to the Northern Expressway, and the Gawler trotting track.

Buchfelde contains two cemeteries: the Pioneer cemetery includes the grave of Otto von Schomburgk, and the Roediger Memorial cemetery associated with the former St Paul's Lutheran Church. The St. Paul's congregation was established some time before the Lutheran chapel burned down in 1862. The replacement building was consecrated in 1863. The congregation merged into the Zion congregation in Gawler in 1927 The building was gifted to the Methodist Church. The church was later closed and has been demolished.

=== Climate ===
Climate data for Buchfelde
Month	Jan	Feb	Mar	Apr	May	Jun	Jul	Aug	Sep	Oct	Nov	Dec	Year
Mean daily maximum °C (°F)	29.0 (84.2)	30.0 (86.0)	27.6 (81.7)	23.8 (74.8)	19.0 (66.2)	16.0 (60.8)	15.0 (59.0)	16.0 (60.8)	18.0 (64.4)	22.0 (71.6)	25.0 (77.0)	28.0 (82.4)	22.5 (72.4)
Mean daily minimum °C (°F)	15.0 (59.0)	16.0 (60.8)	14.0 (57.2)	12.0 (53.6)	9.0 (48.2)	7.0 (44.6)	7.0 (44.6)	7.0 (44.6)	8.0 (46.4)	10.0 (50.0)	12.0 (53.6)	14.0 (57.2)	10.9 (51.7)
Average rainfall mm (inches)	19.2 (0.76)	16.0 (0.63)	20.8 (0.82)	33.4 (1.31)	35.4 (1.39)	38.8 (1.53)	47.7 (1.88)	51.5 (2.03)	50.7 (2.00)	38.7 (1.52)	24.1 (0.95)	17.4 (0.69)	393.7 (15.51)
Source: NOAA.
