= Ward Belt =

- Town
- Coordinates: 34.58°S 138.67°E
- Country: Australia
- State: South Australia
- LGA: Light Regional Council
- Location: 7 km (4.3 mi) W of Gawler

Government
  - State electorate: Ngadjuri
  - Federal divisions: Grey; Spence

Population
  - Total: 158 (SAL 2021)
- Postcode: 5118
Localities around Ward Belt
Reeves Plains	Kangaroo Flat	Gawler Belt
	Ward Belt	Reid
Lewiston	Gawler River	Buchfelde

Ward Belt (originally known as Ward's Belt) is a locality to the west of Gawler in South Australia. The area is predominantly used for grain, beef and sheep farming.

When the Max Fatchen Expressway was completed in 2011, it divided Buchfelde so the portion north of the expressway was reassigned to Ward Belt. This included the area of the Gawler Aerodrome which was formerly in Buchfelde but is now in Ward Belt.

== Primitive Methodist Chapel ==
The foundation stone for the Primitive Methodist chapel at Ward's Belt was laid on 26 February 1874. The land and building materials for the chapel were donated by Mr James Sparshott J.P. The chapel opened on 26 April the same year. The chapel was renovated in 1894. The chapel was pulled down in 1926. Sparshott is buried in the small cemetery that is all that remains of the chapel.

== Hotel ==
There had also been a hotel at Ward Belt, although it was very run down in 1912.
