= Light Regional Council =

Coordinates: 34°25′S 138°50′E

- Local government area
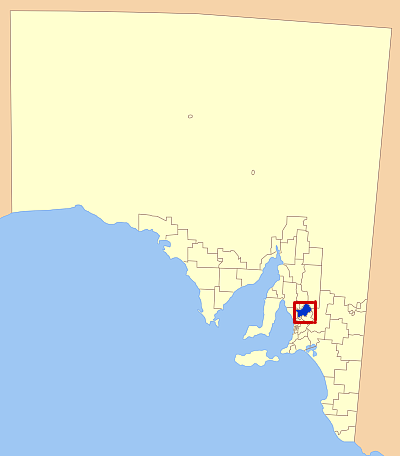
- Location of Light Regional Council in blue

- Interactive map of Light Regional Council
- Country: Australia
- State: South Australia
- Region: Barossa Light and Lower North
- Established: 1996
- Council seat: Kapunda

Government
  - Mayor: Bill Close
  - State electorate: Light, Schubert
  - Federal divisions: Barker; Grey; Spence

Area
  - Total: 1,277.6 km^{2} (493.3 sq mi)

Population
  - Total: 15,792 (LGA 2021)
  - Density: 12.36/km^{2} (32.0/sq mi)
- Website: Light Regional Council
LGAs around Light Regional Council
Wakefield Regional Council	District Council of Clare and Gilbert Valleys	Regional Council of Goyder
Adelaide Plains Council	Light Regional Council	Mid Murray Council
City of Playford	Town of Gawler	Barossa Council

Light Regional Council is a local government area north of Adelaide in South Australia. It is based in the town of Kapunda, and includes the towns of Freeling, Greenock, Hansborough, Hewett, Roseworthy and Wasleys.

The council is named for the River Light, the south bank of which forms much of the council area's northwest border. The river is named after William Light, the first Surveyor-General of South Australia.

== History ==
The council came into existence on 1 March 1996 as the District Council of Light and Kapunda by the amalgamation of the District Council of Light and the District Council of Kapunda. The council changed to the current name of Light Regional Council on 1 July 2000.

== Geography ==
The council includes the localities of Allendale North, Bagot Well, Bethel, Daveyston, Ebenezer, Fords, Freeling, Gawler Belt, Gawler River, Gomersal, Greenock, Hamilton, Hewett, Kangaroo Flat, Kapunda, Kingsford, Koonunga, Linwood, Magdala, Marananga, Moppa, Morn Hill, Nain, Pinkerton Plains, Roseworthy, Seppeltsfield, Shea-Oak Log, St Johns, St Kitts, Stone Well, Tanunda, Templers, Ward Belt, Wasleys and Woolsheds, and parts of Hamley Bridge, Hansborough, Lyndoch, Nuriootpa, Reeves Plains, Rosedale, Rowland Flat, Stockwell and Truro.

== Transport ==
The council district is crossed by the Horrocks Highway, Thiele Highway and Sturt Highway, all radiating from the northern end of the Gawler Bypass Road which forms the boundary between Light Regional Council and the Town of Gawler. Light also contains the northern end of the Max Fatchen Expressway.

The council was also spanned by the Morgan railway line (Gawler, Roseworthy, Freeling, Kapunda toward Eudunda) and Peterborough railway line (from the junction at Roseworthy through Wasleys toward Hamley Bridge). Both lines closed in the early 21st century.

== Councillors ==
Ward	Councillor	Notes	
Mayor	Bill Close		
Dutton	Colin Ross		
Dutton	Deane Rohrlach		
Dutton	Fabio Antonioli		
Light	Lynette Reichstein		
Light	Peter Kennelly		
Light	Simon Zeller		
Mudla Wirra	Alyson Emery		
Mudla Wirra	Michael Phillips-Ryder		Former Liberal Member
Mudla Wirra	vacant		

The Light Regional Council has a directly elected mayor.

On 29 July 2025 Bill Close was elected as Mayor for the Light Regional Council following the resignation of former Mayor, Bill O'Brien. At a Special Council Meeting on 12 August 2025 Council held the investiture ceremony for Mayor Close.

== See also ==
- Light River
- List of parks and gardens in rural South Australia
