= Hillier, South Australia =

Hillier
- Suburb
- Country: Australia
- State: South Australia
- City: Adelaide
- LGAs: Town of Gawler; City of Playford
- Location: 35 km (22 mi) N of Adelaide city centre

Government
  - State electorate: Light (2011)
  - Federal division: Spence

Population
  - Total: 814 (SAL 2021)
- Postcode: 5116
Suburbs around Hillier
Gawler River	Buchfelde	Evanston
Angle Vale	Hillier	Evanston
Munno Para Downs	Kudla	Evanston Gardens

Hillier is a northern suburb of Adelaide, South Australia. It is located in the Town of Gawler.

== Geography ==
Hillier is a western suburb of the Gawler local government area. It is primarily bounded by Angle Vale Road, Wingate Road, the Sturt Highway and the Gawler River.

== Demographics ==
The 2021 Census by the Australian Bureau of Statistics counted 814 persons in Hillier on census night. Of these, 47% were male and 53% were female.

The majority of residents (62.3%) are of Australian birth, with other common census responses being England (21.6%), Scotland (2.1%) and Vietnam (1.4%).

The age distribution of Hillier residents is skewed higher than the greater Australian population. 73.5% of residents were over 25 years in 2021, compared to the Australian average of 69.8%; and 26.5% were younger than 25 years, compared to the Australian average of 30.2%.

== Community ==
Local newspapers include the News Review Messenger and The Bunyip. Other regional and national newspapers such as The Plains Producer, The Advertiser and The Australian are also available.

== Facilities and attractions ==
Hillier Park caravan park is located on Hillier Road.

=== Parks ===
Murray Hillier Reserve is located between Clifford Road and the Gawler River.

== Transportation ==
=== Roads ===
Hillier is serviced by Angle Vale Road.

== See also ==
- List of Adelaide suburbs
