= Hay Bridge, New South Wales =

Hay Bridge
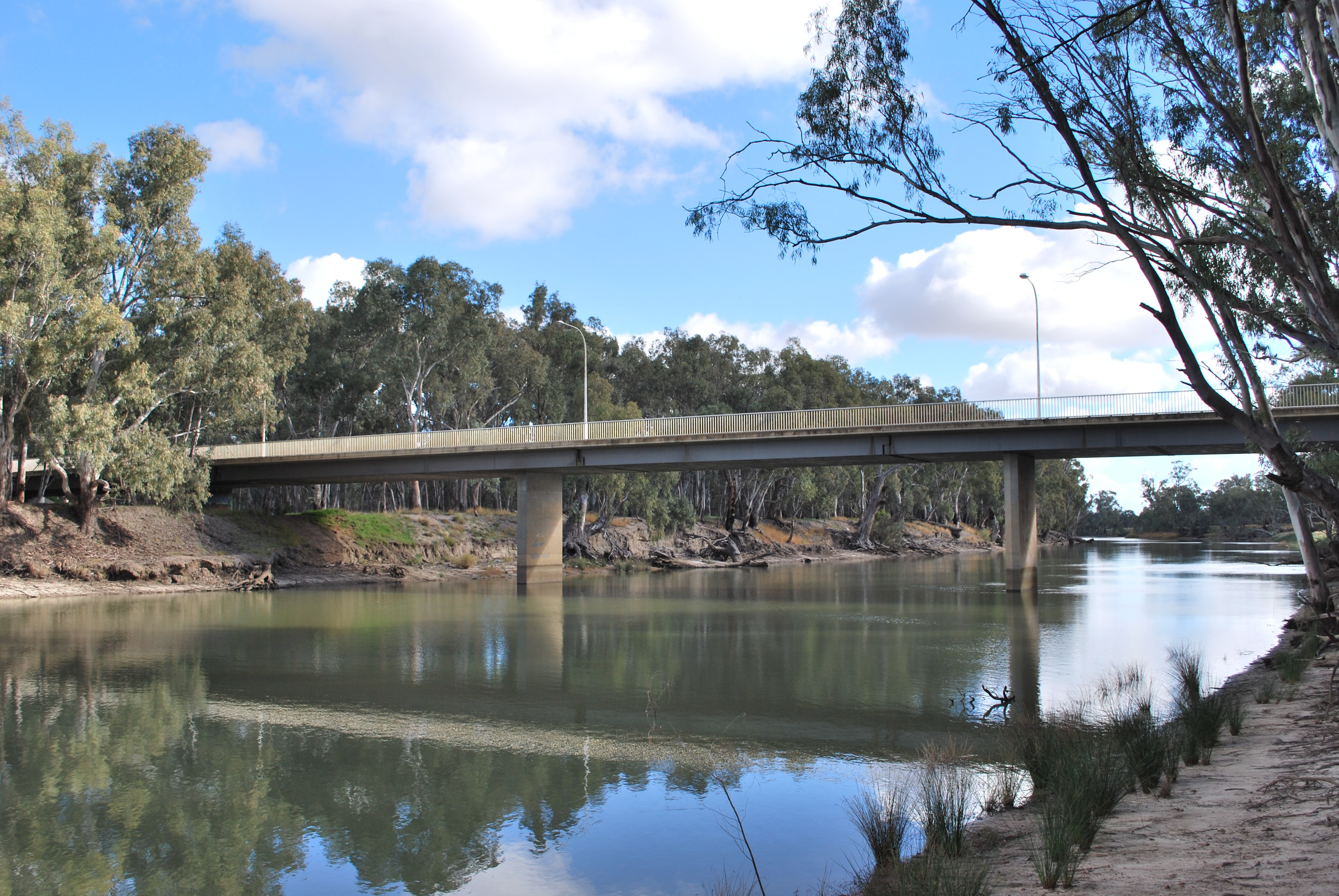
- The current bridge across the Murrumbidgee River at Hay
- Coordinates: 34°30′59″S 144°50′33″E
- Carries: Cobb Highway
- Crosses: Murrumbidgee River
- Locale: Hay, New South Wales, Australia
- Begins: Hay
- Ends: Hay South
- Named for: Hay
- Owner: Transport for NSW
- Preceded by: Murrumbidgee River bridge, Carrathool
- Followed by: Maude Matthews Bridge

Characteristics
- Design: Box girder
- Material: Reinforced concrete and steel
- Trough construction: Reinforced concrete
- Pier construction: Concrete
- Total length: 194 metres (638 ft)
- Width: 9.1 metres (30 ft)
- Longest span: 32 metres (105 ft)
- No. of spans: 6
- No. of lanes: 2

History
- Designer: NSW Department by Central Constructions
- Contracted lead designer: Gordon Bull & Associates
- Construction cost: $890,000
- Inaugurated: 8 June 1973
- Replaces: Old Hay Bridge

Location
- Interactive map of Hay Bridge

The Hay Bridge is a road bridge that carries the Cobb Highway across the Murrumbidgee River at Hay, New South Wales, Australia. The first bridge opened in 1873 being replaced by the current bridge in 1973.

== Current bridge ==
The current Hay Bridge is a six-span, reinforced concrete and steel box girder structure supported on steel piles and slender concrete piers. It has an overall length of 194 metres (638 ft) with two 30-metre (97 ft) spans and four 32-metre (105 ft) spans, and is 9 metres (30 ft) between kerbs. A two-metre-wide (five-foot) footpath was provided for pedestrian use.

Each box girder is made up of five cells each two metres (six feet) wide and one metre (three feet three inches) high. The base and walls of each cell are steel plates and the reinforced concrete deck forms the top section. A feature of the design is the cantilever construction of the girders. This allows a greater distance between piers than a simply supported span design.

Hay is located on the Western Plains where the clay and silt deposit can be up to 457 metres (1,500 ft) in depth. Due to the complete absence of rock in this deposit, 25 by 25 centimetres (10 in × 10 in) in rolled "H" section steel piles have been used for the foundations. These vary from 16 to 25 metres (51 to 81 ft) in length.

Coffer dams of steel sheet piling were constructed in the river to enable the construction of the two pile caps and the lower portions of the two piers in the river. The steel girders were manufactured in Sydney in pairs 5 metres (15 ft) wide, transported by road to Hay and bolted together after having been placed in position on falsework. The longest sections handled were 20 metres (65 ft), end to end, and each weighed 22 tonnes (24 short tons).

The bridge was designed by Gordon Bull & Associates, Consulting Engineers and was constructed under the supervision of the Department by Central Constructions of New South Wales. The approaches were designed and constructed by the department. The total cost of the bridge and approaches was A$890,000. The completion of this bridge by the DMR, together with the channelisation of the intersection of State Highways Nos 14 and 21 immediately south of the bridge and the reconstruction of Lachlan Street, State Highway No. 21, Cobb Highway by Hay Shire Council, immediately north of the bridge, ensured a smoother flow of traffic through the town of Hay.

The bridge was opened by Harry Jago, the NSW Assistant Minister for Highways, on 8 June 1973, the same day as he also opened a replacement bridge across the Murrumbidgee River at Balranald, 129 kilometres (80 mi) west.

== Former bridge ==
Old Hay Bridge
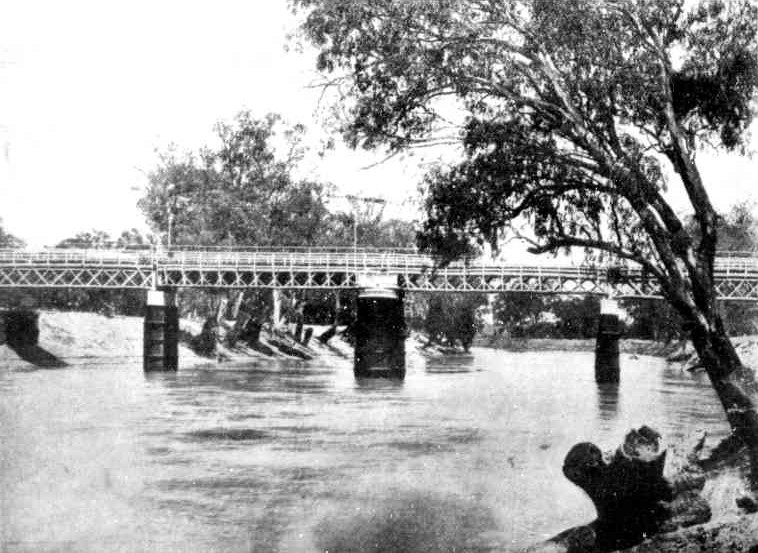
- The old Hay Bridge in 1908
- Coordinates: 34°30′59″S 144°50′33″E

Characteristics
- Longest span: 18.3 metres (60 ft)
- No. of spans: 4

History
- Fabrication by: PN Russell & Co
- Construction start: September 1871
- Opened: 1873
- Inaugurated: 29 August 1874
- Closed: 1973
- Replaced by: New Hay Bridge

Statistics
- Toll: 1873–1890

Location
- Interactive map of Old Hay Bridge

The former Hay Bridge was a swing bridge that carried the Cobb Highway across the Murrumbidgee River from 1873 until 1973.

The bridge consisted of two fixed and two swing spans. It was of a lattice girder design, with timber decking. The drum was a composite of cast and wrought iron that was carried on the centre pier. The opening of the bridge was operated by hand. The bridge was opened to allow riverboats to pass the bridge.

The swing spans were each of 18.3 metres (60 ft) in length. The swinging spans turned on a pier in the centre of the river. The lower portion of the central pier was cast iron and 4.0 metres (13 ft) in diameter; it continued 6.1 metres (20 ft) below the bed of the river. The upper portion of the central pier was wrought iron, 3.7 metres (12 ft) in diameter, and 8.8 metres (29 ft) in height, with an ornamental moulding on top; within this was the iron rack on which a pinion gear allowed the swing span to the opened by one person. The pivot shaft was 2.4 metres (8 ft) long and 20.3 centimetres (8 in) in diameter. The upper part of the central pier was fitted with adjusting screws to regulate weights, and carried the gearing and platform used to turn the bridge.

The piers for the side spans each consisted of a pair of cylinders, each 1.8 metres (6 ft) in diameter of cast and wrought iron. All the piers were filled with brickwork and concrete and braced together with iron rivets. The piers of the side span had adjusting screws for equalising the heights of swing and fixed spans. The roadway of side spans was 5.2 metres (17 ft) wide, and over swing spans was 4.6 metres (15 ft) to allow for wrought-iron cantilevers to be accommodated.

The contractors for the ironwork were PN Russell & Co, and the sinking and fixing of the piers was by the Government of New South Wales under KA Franklin. PN Russell & Co won the tender for the iron bridgework in January 1870 and the cylinders for the piers were cast at their works in Sydney during 1870. There was a separate contract for the approaches, which was the last piece of work to be finished. Construction began around September 1871 and all work was completed in 1873.

The bridge was officially opened by the Premier of New South Wales, Henry Parkes, on 29 August 1874, when he named the new bridge the Hay Bridge. A toll was payable for using the bridge up to 1890. The bridge had a permanent caretaker whose job was to keep up the opening mechanism and open the bridge when needed to allow river traffic to pass.

Even before the bridge opened, two riverboats had minor collisions with it. In 1906, the river steamer William Davies was involved in an accident while passing the bridge. There were also a number of serious traffic accidents on the bridge and its approaches. Some of these were put down to the poor condition of the bridge roadway, which was very narrow for motor traffic.

In 1931, the opening mechanism of the old bridge had broken and the steamboat PS Pevensey had to pull the span open and then pull it closed again. By the 1930s river traffic on the Murrumbidgee was in decline. The last occasions when the bridge was opened were, in August 1936, for Ulonga and, in early 1937 for Adeline, carrying a load of timber. The swing span was locked in 1937.

The Hay Bridge was demolished in 1973 and replaced with a modern concrete bridge. The turntable of the old bridge was relocated to the Lions Park in Hay.
