= Evanston, South Australia =

Evanston
- Suburb
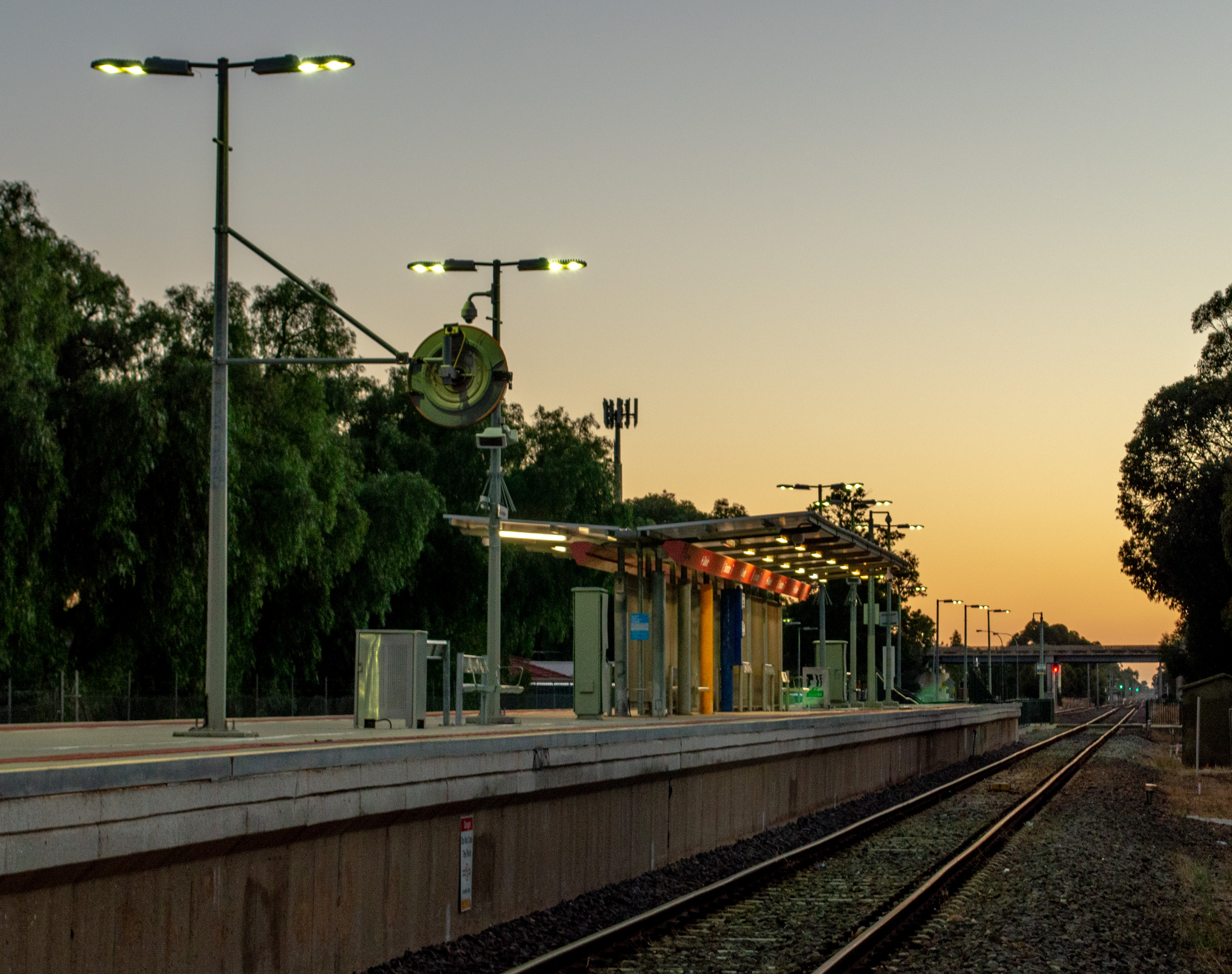
- Evanston Railway Station

- Coordinates: 34°36′58″S 138°43′54″E
- Country: Australia
- State: South Australia
- City: Gawler
- LGA: Town of Gawler

Government
  - State electorate: Light
  - Federal division: Spence

Population
  - Total: 2,580 (SAL 2021)
- Postcode: 5116
Suburbs around Evanston
Buchfelde, Reid	Gawler West	Gawler South
Hillier	Evanston
Evanston Gardens	Evanston South	Evanston Park

Evanston, formerly Evans Town, is a suburb south of the town of Gawler, South Australia. It contains the Gawler and District College and Gawler Racecourse as well as a supermarket and homemaker centre containing bulky goods stores such as carpet, fishing, electrical and bike and motorbike shops.

== History ==
Before settlement, the Kaurna people, or Adelaide Plains tribe, lived in the area.

In 1850 James Philcox named sections 3220 and 3221 in the Hundred of Munno Para, calling the allotment Evanston. James Philcox (22 January 1812 – 31 March 1893) was an English land speculator and property developer in the 1840s and 1850s in the colony of South Australia. He is credited with naming the inner eastern Adelaide suburb of Marryatville as well as the outer northern suburb of Evanston. He returned to England to retire in Sussex in 1853. James Philcox was born in Burwash, Sussex, England, on 22 January 1812, of parents John and Esther.[1] He married Ann Taylor Evans on 18 October 1838 in Burwash.[2][3] The township of Evanston is most likely named for his wife Ann Taylor Evans. In 1853 a plan of the Evanston township was lodged at the South Australian Lands Title Office, when it was transferred to Sir John Morphett. On 14 November 1855, The Register called it "Evans Town".
