= Hewett, South Australia =

Hewett
- Suburb
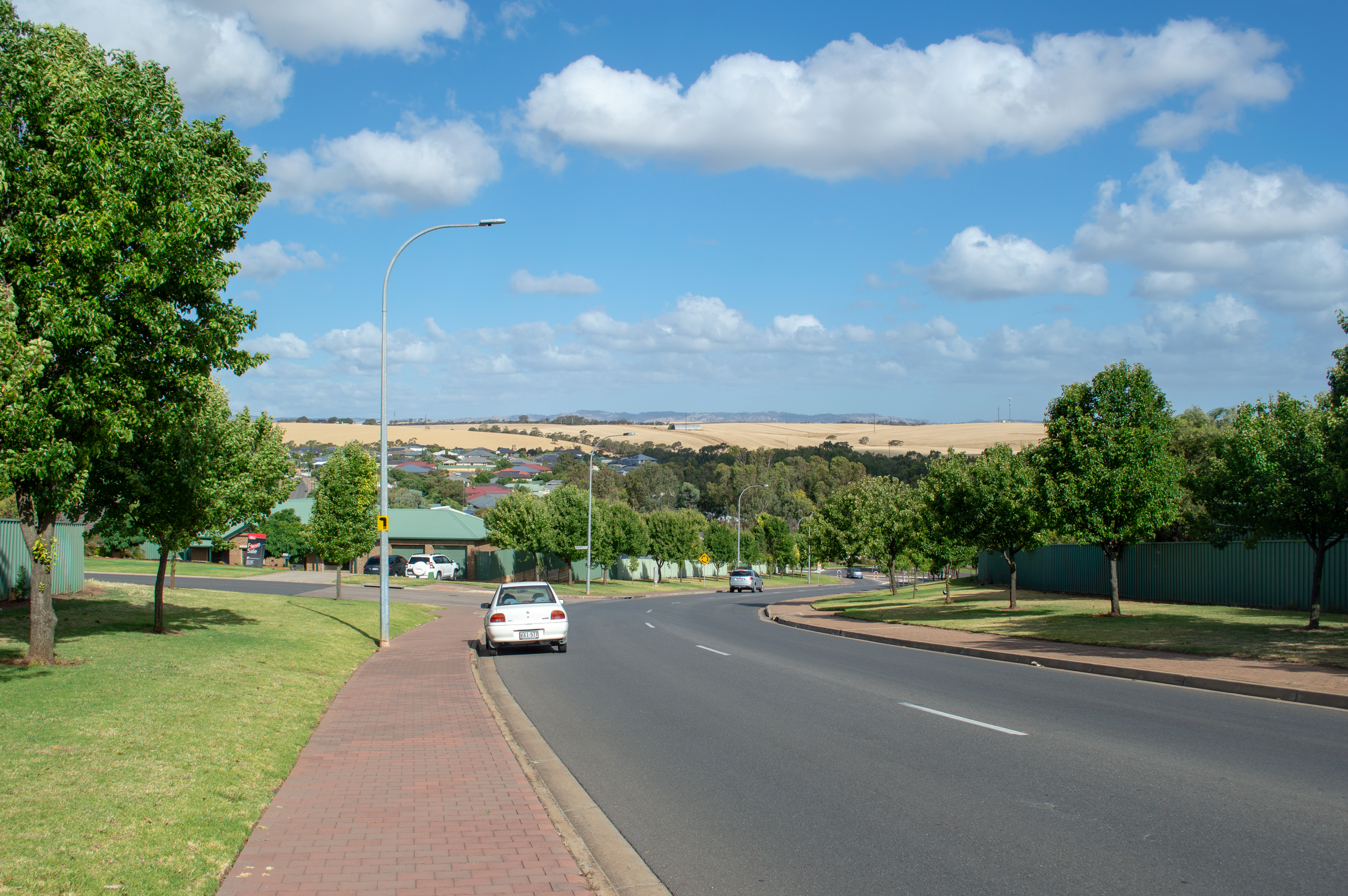
- View over Hewett looking east

- Coordinates: 34°34′44″S 138°44′56″E
- Country: Australia
- State: South Australia
- City: Gawler
- LGA: Light Regional Council
- Location: 40 km (25 mi) NE of Adelaide CBD

Government
  - State electorate: Ngadjuri
  - Federal division: Spence

Population
  - Total: 2,961 (SAL 2021)
- Postcode: 5118
- County: Gawler
Suburbs around Hewett
	Roseworthy	Kingsford
Gawler Belt	Hewett	Concordia
Willaston	Clonlea Park

Hewett is a Northern suburb of Gawler in South Australia and at the most northern part of the Adelaide Metropolitan Region. Even though technically within the metropolitan it is currently not serviced by Adelaide Metro.

Hewett was established in April 2001.
