= Division of Spence =

Australian federal electoral division

Spence Australian House of Representatives Division
- Interactive map of boundaries since the 2019 federal election
- Created: 2019
- MP: Matt Burnell
- Party: Labor
- Namesake: Catherine Helen Spence
- Electors: 138,902 (2025)
- Area: 532 km^{2} (205.4 sq mi)
- Demographic: Outer metropolitan
- Coordinates: 34.7°S 138.7°E
Electorates around Spence:
O'Donoghue	O'Donoghue	Barker
Gulf St Vincent	Spence	Barker; Mayo
Hindmarsh	Makin	Mayo

The Division of Spence is an electoral district for the Australian House of Representatives. It is located in the outer northern suburbs of Adelaide in South Australia.

== Geography ==
Federal electoral division boundaries in Australia are determined at redistributions by a redistribution committee appointed by the Australian Electoral Commission. Redistributions occur for the boundaries of divisions in a particular state, and they occur every seven years, or sooner if a state's representation entitlement changes or when divisions of a state are malapportioned.

== History ==
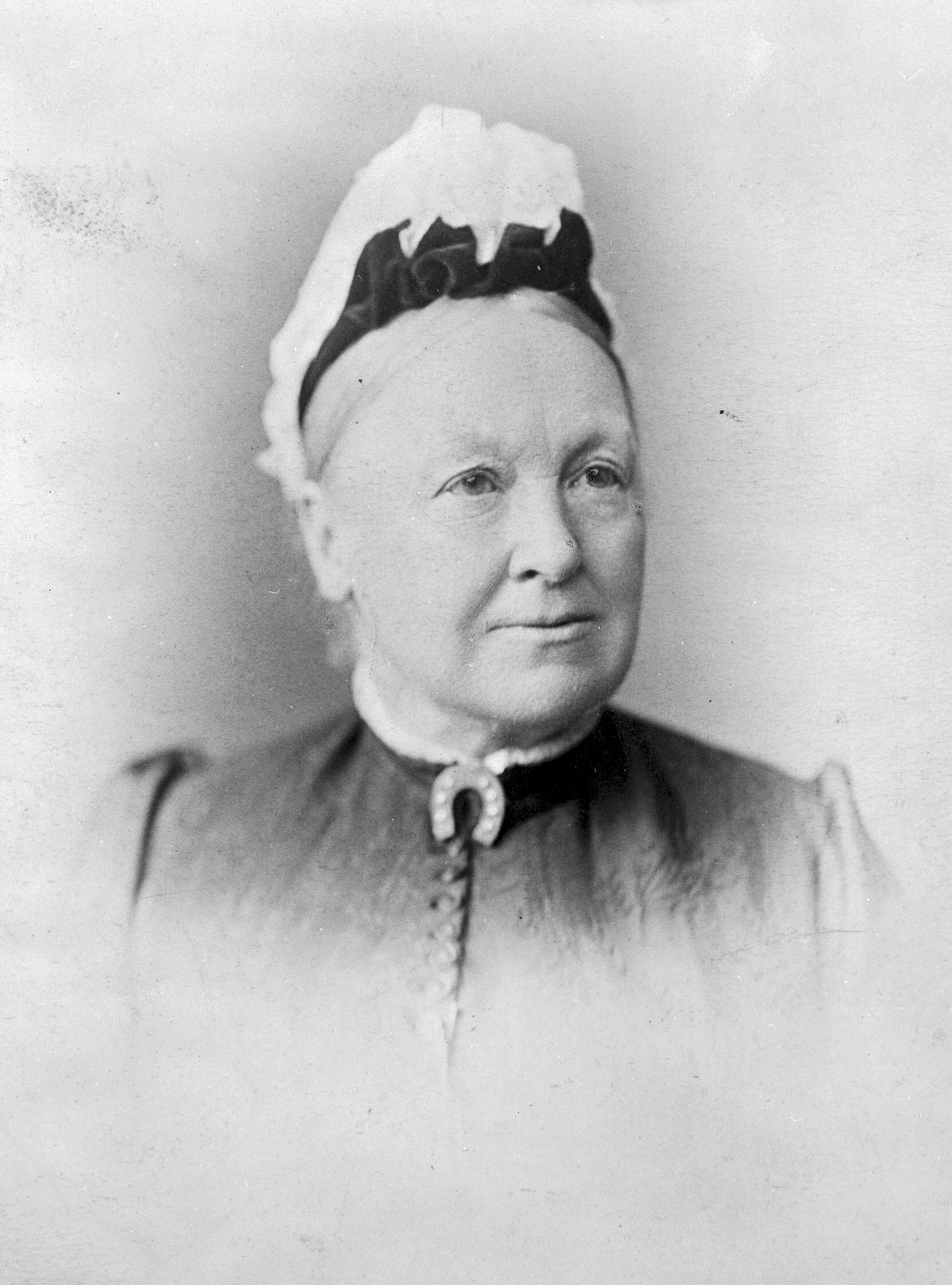
Catherine Helen Spence, the division's namesake

It is named in honour of Catherine Helen Spence, an advocate for female suffrage and electoral reform and the first female political candidate in Australia.

Spence was created in the electoral redistribution that concluded in July 2018 as a replacement for the Division of Wakefield. It is essentially the more urbanised southern portion of the formerly hybrid urban-rural Wakefield. The Division of Port Adelaide was abolished after South Australia was reduced from 11 electorates to ten, resulting in quite large movements of the remaining divisions' boundaries to fill in the gap.

The geographic extent of Spence is approximately the Adelaide Plains between the Little Para River in the south and the Gawler River on the north, plus areas around Gawler and Salisbury. It includes all of the City of Playford and Town of Gawler, along with Concordia and Kalbeeba from the Barossa Council, and Gawler Belt and Buchfelde from Light Regional Council on the outskirts of Gawler. Spence includes six suburbs in the City of Salisbury south of the Little Para River, west and north of Main North Road and Kings Road.

Spence overlaps the final configuration of Bonython before it was abolished prior to the 2004 election and much of it was merged with what had been the southern part of Wakefield. Spence extends further east, west and north than Bonython at the time of its abolition, but Wakefield had historically been a rural seat until 2004.

Spence was notionally a comfortably safe Labor seat, with a notional Labor margin of 17.9 percent, making it on paper the safest Labor seat in the state. By comparison, the abolished Wakefield finished with a safe Labor margin of 11.0 percent. Champion retained it in 2019 with only a small swing against him. Spence is the safest Labor seat in SA, with a 14.1 percent swing needed for the Liberals to win it.

== Members ==
Image	Member	Party	Term	Notes
	Nick Champion (1972–)	Labor	18 May 2019 – 22 February 2022	Previously held the Division of Wakefield. Resigned to transfer to state politics. Subsequently elected to the South Australian Legislative Assembly seat of Taylor in 2022
	Matt Burnell (1978–)	Labor	21 May 2022 – present	Incumbent

== Election results ==
2025 Australian federal election: Spence
Party	Candidate	Votes	%	±%
Labor	Matt Burnell	49,463	44.33	+0.47
Liberal	Daniel Wild	20,852	18.69	−6.87
Greens	Luke Skinner	16,166	14.49	+3.14
One Nation	Darryl Bothe	10,654	9.55	−1.31
Family First	John Bennett	4,901	4.39	+4.39
Trumpet of Patriots	Paul Morrell	4,454	3.99	+2.36
Independent	Kym Hanton	2,749	2.46	+2.46
Animal Justice	Miranda Smith	2,343	2.10	+2.10
Total formal votes		111,582	91.80	−3.25
Informal votes		9,968	8.20	+3.25
Turnout		121,550	87.51	+0.94
Two-party-preferred result
Labor	Matt Burnell	72,903	65.34	+2.44
Liberal	Daniel Wild	38,679	34.66	−2.44
Labor hold		Swing	+2.44	
