= Electoral Districts Act 1872 =

The Electoral Districts Act 1872 (No 27 of 1872) was an act of the Government of South Australia. It increased the size of the House of Assembly to 46 members and defined the boundaries of the districts which elected them. It repealed sections 3 and 4 of the Electoral Act 1861. The Legislative Council continued to be elected by a single electoral district over the entire province of South Australia. It was to take effect only from the next time the House of Assembly was dissolved or expired.

The Assembly members were to be elected from 22 electoral districts and the First Schedule to the Act specified how many members from each district, as well as defining the boundaries of each district. The Second Schedule specified the polling places to be used for each district, but the list could be changed later.

== Electoral districts ==
Place spelling is displayed as it appeared in the schedule to the Act.

Number	Name	Number of members	Place of nomination and chief voting place	Other voting places	Notes
1	East Adelaide	2	Adelaide Town Hall		
2	West Adelaide	2	Post Office Buildings, Adelaide		
3	North Adelaide	1	North Adelaide		
4	Wallaroo	3	Wallaroo	Kadina, Moonta, Edithburgh, Green's Plain, Kulpara	
5	Port Adelaide	2	Town Hall, Port Adelaide	Woodville, Virginia, Grand Junction	
6	West Torrens	2	Hindmarsh	Hilton, Islington, Gilles Plains, Dry Creek	
7	Yatala	2	Salisbury	Virginia, Smithfield, Two Wells, near Wasleys, Mallala, Buchfelde	
8	Gumeracha	2	Gumeracha	Mount Pleasant, South Petherton, Springton, Maidstone, Tea Tree Gully, Mount Torrens, Blumberg, Palmer	
9	East Torrens	2	Norwood Town Hall	Glynde, Walkerville, Glen Osmond, Magill	
10	Sturt	2	Unley	Mitcham, South Road, Glenelg, Brighton	
11	Noarlunga	2	Noarlunga	Clarendon, Coromandel Valley, Happy Valley, Morphett Vale, Meadows, Willunga, Aldinga, Ashbourne	
12	Mount Barker	2	Strathalbyn	Echunga, Mount Barker, Macclesfield, Woodchester, Milang, Langhorne's Creek, Wellington West, Hahndorf	
13	Onkaparinga	2	Woodside	Norton Summit, Stirling East, Nairne, Callington, Harrowgate, Hahndorf, Lobethal, Kanmantoo, Mount Lofty	
14	Encounter Bay	2	Port Elliot	Goolwa, Myponga, Yankalilla, Rapid Bay, Cape Jervis, Inman Valley, Hog Bay, Port Victor	
15	Barossa	2	Tanunda	Gawler, Lyndoch Valley, Angaston, Truro, Williamstown, Blanchetown, Keyneton	
16	Light	3	Kapunda	Greenock, Bagot Well, Marrabel, Hansborough, Linwood, Freeling, Ashwell, Shea-Oak Log	
17	Victoria	2	Gambierton	Port MacDonnell, Tarpeena, Millicent, Penola	
18	Albert	2	Naracoorte	Robe, Kingston, Meningie, East Wellington, Border Town	
19	Burra	2	Kooringa or Redruth	Saddleworth, Steelton, Hundred of Hallett, Gottlieb's Well, Jamestown	
20	Stanley	2	Clare	Rochester, Redhill, George Town, Port Pirie, Lochiel, Mintaro	
21	Wooroora	2	Riverton	Humphrey's Springs, Stockport, Port Wakefield, Balaklava, Auburn, Rhynie, Watervale, Tarlee, Hoyleton	
22	Flinders	3	Port Augusta	Port Lincoln, Melrose, Streaky Bay, Blinman, Kanyaka, Prince Alfred Mine, Winninnie	
