= Thomas Hamilton Ayliffe =

Medical doctor and early settler of South Australia (1774–1852)

- Born: 1774; England
- Died: 28 May 1852 (aged 77–78); Sturt River, South Australia
- Resting place: West Terrace Cemetery
- Other name: Thomas Ilive
- Occupations: Medical doctor and surgeon
- Known for: Colonial doctor in South Australia

Thomas Hamilton Ayliffe MD (1774 – 28 May 1852) was a medical doctor whose family were early settlers of South Australia, remembered in several place names, namely Ayliffe's Crossing and Ayliffe Hill, which is skirted by Ayliffes Road in the southern Adelaide suburb of St Marys.

== History ==
Ayliffe was born into a wealthy and well-connected family whose details are somewhat obscure. His father died when he was four. Around the age of 12, Ayliffe, with a brother and two sisters, were placed in the guardianship of George Wyndham, 3rd Earl of Egremont (18 December 1751 – 11 November 1837), who was also executor of their father's will, and their surnames were changed to the earlier form of "Ilive". Thomas's eldest sister Elizabeth Ilive ( – 30 December 1822) was one of the earl's mistresses, and had several children by him, the eldest being George Wyndham (5 June 1787 – 18 March 1869), later to become Colonel Wyndham, then Lord Leconfield.

Thomas was sent to St John's College, Cambridge to study medicine. On 5 April 1796, before he had completed his course, Thomas, who had resumed the surname Ayliffe, married Hester Jinks. She was two years his senior, a Catholic and of unassuming parentage. The union was deemed unsuitable by the Earl, who withdrew Ayliffe from the university in disgrace and cut him out of his father's will. By the terms of the will this was within his rights until Thomas turned 28.

Ayliffe somehow completed his BA degree in 1800, and what formal qualifications he had to practise medicine are unclear, though he was styled "surgeon", and taught what he knew to his sons. After having seven children, the Earl and Duchess were married legally in 1801, then in May 1803 separated. The Earl died on 11 November 1837 and Col. George Wyndham (5 June 1787 – 18 March 1869), who inherited everything except the title, settled £40,000 on Ayliffe in the form of land in South Australia selected by Frederick Mitchell: some 160 acres (65 ha) in the Adelaide foothills near Sturt Creek (sections 12, 13 and 14, Hundred of Adelaide), some 600 or 700 acres (240 or 280 ha) near Clare, and a large area on Yorke Peninsula, as well as livestock and buildings. By the terms of the sale Ayliffe was obliged to settle on the property.

Thomas and Hester with their three sons and families emigrated to South Australia on the Pestonjee Bomanjee, arriving in October 1838. Governor Gawler, who came out on the same boat, became a family friend. They arrived in October 1838 and camped at Glenelg, near the site of the present Town Hall. Also on Pestonjee Bomanjee were Henry Sanders and his wife Sarah née Knott, parents of George Ayliffe's wife Elizabeth (1810–1844) and Dr. Henry Ayliffe's future wife Esther Sanders (c. 1815–18). Other Sanders family members on the ship had been engaged by the Ayliffes as servants or employees. Among their staff was head groom Henry Ayers, later Sir Henry. They had brought with them some livestock including brood mares and a stallion. They settled on their foothills property, dubbed "Wyndham Farm", their first residence being a prefabricated wooden structure, a "Manning's portable cottage" or similar, and a substantial house was completed soon after.

He lived at "Wyndham Farm" with his family, and opened a medical practice with his sons George and Henry as T.H., G., & H. Ayliffe, in the former residence of R. Craigie, Angas Street near Drummond's Scotch Secession Church. George died in 1844 and the practice continued as T.H. & H. Ayliffe.

Thomas died peacefully after a few hours' illness. His wife Hester is recorded as Esther Ayliffe, wife of T V Ayliffe, died at Sturt on 10 June 1850 aged 79. Her name appears on the Pestonjee Bomanjee passenger list, as with their son Thomas Hamilton Ayliffe (c. 1812–1895).

=== The immigrants ===
Two married daughters (Cecelia, who may have been born as early as 1791, and Frances) remained in England, and their second son (Thomas) Hamilton Ayliffe (c. 1812 – 28 July 1895), though booked on the Pestonjee Bomanjee, did not emigrate until years later; the reason is not clear. It is also not certain that Thomas Ayliffe's wife Hester was on board.

George Hamilton Ayliffe, in full perhaps George Edward Frederick Hamilton Ayliffe, (1810 – 13 October 1844) and his wife Elizabeth née Sanders (1809 – 26 October 1894) also emigrated on the Pestonjee Bomanjee in 1838, and settled in "Belle Vue" cottage, South Road, St Marys. They were particular friends of Sir Dominick Daly and Lady Daly. His son, also named George Hamilton Ayliffe (25 May 1840 – 2 November 1906), succeeded H. T. Whittell as Registrar of Births Deaths and Marriages in January 1889.

He died after a painful and protracted illness. His wife Elizabeth never remarried and continued to live at "Belle Vue". She brought up their children with the financial support of her late husband's cousin, Lord Leconfield. Their children Thomas Hamilton Ayliffe (1834–1900), Ettie Bode (c. 1836–1920), Cecelia Hill (24 August 1838 – 6 November 1915), George Hamilton Ayliffe (1840–1906) and William H. Ayliffe (9 October 1844 – 1928) all had long and productive lives. Elizabeth died peacefully with all her faculties intact and in excellent health up to the last days.

Thomas Hamilton Ayliffe (1834 – 27 March 1900) was four years old when the family left for South Australia. At age 18 he joined the gold rush to Victoria and sent 6 oz. of gold to his mother. He was a contractor who did a lot of business for the Government, including the Bay Road, the South Road, the Morphett Street bridge and the Clarendon bridge and became quite wealthy. He developed on his property a valuable quarry, from which much quartzite and bluestone was obtained. He subsequently engaged in cattle speculation, and lost heavily, and was declared insolvent in 1861. In 1873 he went to New Zealand, where he invested in gold mining ventures, then eight years in the Northern Territory, then worked in Adelaide from 1881 or earlier as an auctioneer and commission agent, with offices in Currie Street. He returned to gold mining in Western Australia, and died in Kanowna.

Elizabeth Esther "Ettie" Ayliffe (c. 1836 – 3 August 1920) was born in Exeter, a daughter of Dr. George Ayliffe, who emigrated to South Australia when she was two years old. She was trained as a teacher, reportedly by T. A. Caterer, though this is most unlikely. Perhaps a confusion with Elizabeth Esther Cecelia Ayliffe (1857–1940) daughter of Dr. Ayliffe of Angaston, who taught at Daveyston for many years (see below).

Was she the Miss Ayliffe who ran a boarding school for ladies at her home "Saltram", in Glenelg in 1875 and 1876?

She married Joseph Adolphus Bode (c. 1819 – 10 June 1898) on 23 March 1877, lived at "Sunningdale Park" near Strathalbyn. She was his second wife; Martha Bode having died in 1865. J. A. Bode was eldest son of Gustavus Adolphus Bode of Mount Pleasant, Staffordshire, England, a prominent military man. J. A. Bode was a regular guest at Government House and a frequent writer to the Press on all manner of subjects.

She was the author of many poems printed in the daily Press, such as Want, Christmas Sonnet, The Story of Cree and Cri and published poetry collections:

- Bode, Ettie E (1885), Original poems, [s.n.]
- Mrs J. A. Bode, The Islander "An island in the Australasian seas", 1878 poetry
- Mrs J. A. Bode, Lubra "Ours was the land, all ours, mine and my peoples: the tribes", 1885 poetry

and several novels serialized in South Australian newspapers:

- Old Love Letters (1870)
- The Flaw in the Diamond (1885)
- A Tale of Colonial Life (1889)

Cecelia Hamilton Wyndham Ayliffe (24 August 1838 – 6 November 1915) was born on the Pestonjee Bomanjee. She married journalist and elocutionist Thomas Padmore "T. P." Hill ( – 28 November 1879) on 26 November 1859. She was author of Checkmated (1878), a roman à clef about the lovelife of J. E. Neild. In later life, while in transit from Venice to Sydney by the R.M.S. Mirzapore, Cecilia was one of the passengers detained at the Torrens Island Quarantine Station in January–February 1882 during an incident of smallpox. Cecilia made trips to New Zealand in 1887 and San Francisco in 1889, during which she falsely claimed that she was a correspondent for the London Morning Post. She subsequently left for England in search of a possible inheritance, but her court case failed due to forged documents; she died on 6 November 1915 in St John’s Wood, Middlesex.

Thomas Hamilton Ayliffe (c. 1812 – 28 July 1895) was recorded as a passenger on the Pestonjee Bomanjee with his father and two brothers, but in fact came out later, perhaps via Hobart on 10 July 1843 or via Launceston, as an Ayliffe (no other name recorded) arrived in Adelaide on the Raven from that port in December 1847. One account had his vessel shipwrecked off New Zealand and he lived with Maoris for a year. He worked for a time as a ship's carpenter on a vessel working between Tasmania and New Zealand. made a visit to New Zealand, where he was made prisoner by the Maoris, but escaped at night and swam out to a trading boat which took him back to South Australia. He was a highly literate man and well-versed in history. He had some medical training, as had his brothers, but unlike them never went into practice. He married Jane Bell (c. 1828 – 9 August 1911) in 1845. He settled in the Sturt district, then moved to the Stockport – Hamley Bridge area, where he lived for 35 years. He served as clerk of the Local Court, on the Stockport District Council, and returning-officer for Wooroora and Light for several years. He was a pioneer of fruit-growing on the River Light. He died leaving a widow, six sons and three daughters.

Dr. Henry Ayliffe FRCS, LSA (1818 – 24 April 1890) studied medicine in London under his father, and emigrated to South Australia on the Pestonjee Bomanjee in 1838 with his father, brother George, nephew Thomas and nieces Elizabeth and Cecelia. He set up in practice and lived in Hindley Street to 1843 then Brown Street in the city. He returned to England for further medical training and higher qualifications at Guy's Hospital and St Bartholomew's Hospital, and returned to Adelaide in 1853, but not without incident, as the ship Anne Milne was wrecked off Portland, Victoria. He resumed practice in Grote Street, close to the Catholic chapel. He moved to Angaston, where he set up in practice, and in 1867 was appointed Government medical officer to the destitute poor.

== Family ==
The list below is not exhaustive, but is expected to include all members of the family likely to be encountered in histories of early European settlement. Bold entries denote members whose biographies appear in "The immigrants" above.

Dr. Thomas Hamilton Ayliffe (1774 – 28 May 1852) married Hester Jinks ( – ) on 5 April 1796. They had two daughters (who married and remained in England and are not listed here) and three sons:

Thomas Hamilton Ayliffe (c. 1812 – 28 July 1895) married Jane Bell (1 February 1828 – 9 August 1911) on 23 July 1845, farmed at Hamley Bridge. He was a brother of Dr. George Hamilton Ayliffe (1810–1844) and Dr. Henry Ayliffe (1818–1890).

- John Hamilton Ayliffe (14 April 1846 – 25 November 1919) married Catherine Mill (12 August 1850 – 24 May 1928) on 9 July 1872, lived in Coonatto (now Moockra), moved to Western Australia and farmed in the Dumbleyung district. Catherine and six children survived him.
- Alfred Hamilton Ayliffe (14 March 1848 – 12 December 1931) married Esther Selina James ( – 1946) on 2 August 1884, lived in Balaklava

- Alfred Sabastian Neil Ayliffe (20 January 1887 – 22 August 1962) married Margaret Matilda Wellner ( – 1952) in 1914
- Ivy Adeline Jane Ayliffe (25 February 1889 – 17 November 1969) married Thomas Albert Henry Victor Adey (1888 – 1918) in 1911; she married again to Peter Dunn in 1921
- Alice Dora Ayliffe (3 June 1892 – 1 March 1967) married William Edward Miller in 1914
- George Ray Ayliffe (5 March 1895 – 1988) married Alice May Collin (1894– ) on 7 October 1918
- Herbert Sydney "Syd" Ayliffe (30 June 1897 – 18 November 1942)

- Walter Courteney Ayliffe (13 March 1850 – 18 December 1908) married Sarah Lang Doidge (1850 – 13 February 1921) in 1875, lived at Hamley Bridge.

- Emily Priscilla Ayliffe (22 January 1877 – 10 December 1952) married William Roberts in 1900
- George Albert Ernest Ayliffe (13 April 1880 – 12 February 1955) married Ada Louisa Batt ( –1944) in 1902
- Julia Elizabeth Ayliffe (13 March 1883 – ) married Thomas Tozer (25 August 1871 – 21 June 1917); she married again, to John Albert Brain (1874– ) on 12 March 1918
- Hurtle Walter Stanley Ayliffe (7 May 1889 – 27 February 1933) married Bertha Amelia Richard ( – 1920) in 1910. He married again to Ethel Blanche Rosina May Martin in 1921

- Mary Jane Ayliffe (26 June 1852 – 15 April 1918) married John Martin jun. of Stockport, lived at Gladstone
- Edmund Ayliffe (13 October 1856 – 14 December 1943) married Charlotte Elizabeth Winton ( – 1943) of Roseworthy on 21 March 1889, lived at Hamley Bridge.

- Stuart Hamilton Ayliffe (21 November 1892 – 26 May 1947) married Eva May Gust ( – 1954) on 28 June 1915
- Edna Charlotte Jane/Jean Ayliffe (26 May 1895 – 21 October 1906) died after her brother's experimental acetylene generator exploded
- Gerald Keith Ayliffe (14 August 1898 – 9 April 1971) married Pretoria Maud Barker, née Hargrave (1900–1989) in 1943
- Clarence Wyndham Ayliffe (8 August 1902 – 5 May 1972) married Doris Francis May Lampard ( – ) in 1927

- Arthur Ayliffe (23 October 1859 – 28 January 1937) of Balaklava
- Hubert Ayliffe (21 March 1862 – 27 January 1940) married Annie Amelia Saunders (17 July 1865 – 7 September 1954) on 24 September 1890, lived in Adelaide

- Archibald Cleve "Archie" Ayliffe (28 December 1892 – 4 September 1967)

- Florence Ayliffe (21 August 1864 – 14 December 1952) married George Frederick William Martin ( – 26 January 1928) on 30 July 1890; children include Don, Dot, Edmund, Laura, Syd and Linda
- Maud Ayliffe (25 March 1867 – 2 August 1931) married John Thomas Quinn ( – 1929) of Mintaro on 23 February 1887, lived Hamley Bridge
- Alice Rose Ayliffe (20 November 1869 – 29 May 1938) married Richard Pillar ( – 5 September 1951) on 15 November 1893, lived Hamley Bridge

Dr. George Hamilton Ayliffe (1810 – 13 October 1844) married Elizabeth Sanders (1809 – 26 October 1894) in England.

- Thomas Hamilton Ayliffe (1834 – 27 March 1900) married Adelaide Miller (1831 – 2 March 1923) in 1857, lived at Wyndham Farm, St. Marys in 1858, then Ovingham in 1880, died in Kanowna, West Australia. She never left the State.

- George Edward Hamilton Ayliffe (11 October 1858 – 21 November 1936) married Letitia Maria Kelsh ( – 1932) on 3 October 1883. He was a surveyor in the Engineer-in-Chief's Department, Adelaide, lived at Childers Street, North Adelaide. He was responsible for laying out the town of "Bligh", renamed Arno Bay in 1940.
- Fanny Adelaide Ayliffe (23 May 1860 – 21 August 1913) married Herbert Ralph Smythe (c. 1854 – 2 January 1922) on 2 September 1880. Herbert was a land agent and member of the Adelaide Stock Exchange.
- Percy St. Barbe Ayliffe (17 December 1865 – 29 June 1927) married Marie Power ( – ) of Tasmania on 24 November 1913. A pioneer of the Gascoyne region, Western Australia. he killed himself by strangulation.
- Ethelwyn Hamilton "Ethel Adelaide" Ayliffe (6 August 1868 – 10 December 1944) married Herbert Edward Hinde ( – 28 June 1944) on 13 December 1902. She was a teacher at Mount Gambier Ladies' College in 1889 and principal in 1892. He was a bank accountant, lived 240 Jeffcott Street, North Adelaide, later 1 Frederick Street, Gilberton. In 1898 she lived at 32 Barnard Street, North Adelaide and was a teacher at a private school, Childers Street, North Adelaide in 1900, then principal. The school closed 1903 and classes were taken over by Mrs. Hinde on the corner of Jeffcott and Barnard Streets. They had two children: John Hinde and Elizabeth "Betty" Hinde.
- Blanche Olave St. Barbe Ayliffe ( – c. 1931) was student at Advanced School for Girls, taught at Mount Bryan East to 1895 (Captain George H. Wilkins a notable student), then appointed provisional teacher at Woodlands, Paddy's Bridge in 1897, Green's Plains, to the north west of Paskeville, South Australia in 1900.
- Olave Adelaide Ayliffe (4 April 1871 – 18 February 1933) had much anguished poetry published in newspapers.
- Lucy Barbara Ingoldsby Smythe (24 February 1882 – 28 September 1917) married A(rthur) Tarlton Jefferis ( – 1965) on 1 June 1911. Tarlton was a leading analytical chemist, a son of Rev. Dr. James Jefferis; novelist Barbara Jefferis was a daughter.

- Elizabeth Esther "Ettie" Ayliffe (c. 1836 – 3 August 1920) married Joseph Adolphus Bode (c. 1819 – 10 June 1898) on 23 March 1877, lived at "Sunningdale Park" near Strathalbyn. She was his second wife; Martha Bode née Chapman having died in 1865. J. A. Bode was eldest son of Gustavus Adolphus Bode of Mount Pleasant, Staffordshire, England.

- Fylafie Iline Hamilton "Effie" Bode (1880 – 11 February 1921) married Joseph Alfred Hayward (c. 1880 – 2 November 1909) on 6 March 1909. She had a daughter Josephine Ada Grantley Hayward on 5 January 1910, in 1938 engaged to, maybe married, George Milne. Fylafie married again, to Arthur Boushear ( –1956) in 1917.

- Cecelia Hamilton Wyndham Ayliffe (24 August 1838 – 6 November 1915) married journalist and elocutionist Thomas Padmore "T. P." Hill ( – 28 November 1879) on 26 November 1859. Their relationship, if any, to Thomas Padmore "Tod" Hill (c. 1889 – 19 July 1937) noted SA horse trainer, who died following a car crash is not known.

- son, perhaps Fred, who became a journalist, (16 January 1862 – ), was still alive in December 1879
- Alfred Brandon Hill (13 March 1864 – 5 December 1875) a brilliant student, he died of scarlet fever. Curiously he was often described as their only son.

- George Hamilton Ayliffe (25 May 1840 – 2 November 1906) married Sarah Ann "Annie" Gleeson (1840 – 20 November 1928) on 26 February 1864. Annie was a daughter of Edward Burton Gleeson, a founder of Clare. George was appointed to the Mounted Police in 1859 then from 1875 held various public service positions including Secretary of the Central Board of Health. He was acting City Coroner during the celebrated Barrington-Sheridan abortion hearings, when his argument with the defendant's counsel was widely reported. When he retired he was Registrar-General of Births, Deaths, and Marriages. The story goes that on the eve of her marriage to Arthur King she eloped with George Ayliffe. In 1878 they were living on Park Street Unley, then around 1885 on Unley Road, opposite the Cremorne Hotel, later at Turner Street, Glenelg.

- Ida Constance Ayliffe (1 March 1865 – 17 January 1937) married con-man Laurence Millington Davidson ( – 30 July 1891) on 14 May 1891. He eloped with her sister Maude six weeks later, which ended in a double suicide (see below). She married again, to Henry George Kelly (c. 1854 – 30 March 1937) of "Kilkerran", Maitland on 6 June 1900.
- (Annie) Maude Ayliffe (16 September 1871 – 30 July 1891) eloped with her sister's husband Laurence Davidson on the liner SS Hohenzollern (1873) on 27 June. The ship arrived at Colombo and he committed suicide by pistol shot in his cabin while being apprehended. Maude swallowed a strychnine capsule and died shortly after.
- Gerald Gleeson Ayliffe (27 October 1873 – 3 November 1948) married Agnes Marion Johns ( – 1945) in 1906. District Clerk of Kingscote, Kangaroo Island. He was a lieutenant in the Bushmen's Corps during the Boer War, married Marie.

- George Hamilton Ayliffe (12 November 1907 – 1989)
- Annie Marion Ayliffe (29 November 1910 – )

- Kathleen Beatrice "Cassie" Ayliffe (2 June 1876 – 21 July 1967) married James Hamilton Windebank (1880–1953) in 1907

- Thomas Hamilton Gerald Windebank (1912–2006)
- Eileen Alice Gleeson Windebank (1908– )

- Claude Hamilton Ayliffe (8 July 1878 – 28 March 1931) married Annette Mary Western ( – ) in 1907, farmed at Keith

- Audrey Annette Wyndham Western Ayliffe (4 June 1908 – 1982) married Gordon Ralph Gilbert (1905–1979) in 1933

- George Wyndham Ayliffe (2 November 1883 – 1 August 1922) married Evelyn Stanbury "Eva" Kelly ( – ) in 1916. He lived at Cygnet River, KI and published poetry 1908–1912 when he left for Maitland. He was active in the community.

- William Hamilton Ayliffe (19 October 1844 – 20 July 1928) married Ellen Maria Pollitt (17 January 1847 – 5 July 1925) on 22 February 1870. In 1881 they were living in Brighton. Ellen was the youngest daughter of James Pollitt

- Frank Hamilton Ayliffe (17 March 1871 – 29 July 1943) married Elizabeth Ann "Bessie" Davison (c. 1867 – 20 August 1924); he married again, to Jean ?? ( – 1967).

- James Hamilton Ayliffe (c. 1891 – 7 November 1917) fought at Gallipoli; killed at Villers-Bretonneux
- William Hawden Ayliffe (c. 1893 – 25 April 1918) killed at Villers-Bretonneux

- Florence Hamilton Ayliffe (14 August 1872 – 25 January 1948) married Henry Carleton Pollitt (1869 – 1925) on 18 May 1917. He was a son of Rev. James Pollitt and a first officer on P & O liners.
- Violet Elsie Ayliffe (1 February 1875 – 1 February 1965) married Frank Hamilton (5 February 1859 – 13 June 1913) on 17 September 1895. He was the principal owner of Hamilton's Ewell Vineyards.
- William Lionel Ayliffe (22 January 1877 – 22 January 1967) married Catherine Kathleen Antony Page (c. 1890 – 17 July 1973) on 22 January 1914, lived on Kangaroo Island

- Burt Ayliffe (23 March 1914 – 14 May 1942) fought with 2nd AIF during WWII. Died of wounds in Italy.
- Jim Ayliffe (14 September 1919 – 20 January 1943) with 2nd AIF, died in Papua New Guinea.
- Clem Ayliffe (19 December 1921 – 23 November 1942) with 2nd AIF, killed in action, Papua New Guinea.

- James Burton Ayliffe (24 March 1879 – 31 July 1967) married Laura Russell Dumas ( – 1955) on 18 September 1912
- Capt. Sydney Hamilton Ayliffe (2 December 1881 – 12 March 1954) married Alice Campbell Strachan, née Campbell, (1889–), widow of Capt. William. Leighton Strachan (31 March 1888 – 25 April 1915), on 8 February 1922; lived 121 Esplanade Brighton. Strachan was killed at Gallipoli. She was a noted worker for patriotic causes; organised the Gallipoli memorial vase held by the State Library.

- Alice Anne Hamilton Ayliffe (22 December 1922 – )
- Cpl. Sydney Hamilton Ayliffe (17 January 1924 – )

Dr. Henry Hamilton Ayliffe (1818 – 24 April 1890) married Esther Sanders (c. 1815 – 11 March 1880) in 1844, lived in Angaston. He was a brother of Thomas Hamilton Ayliffe (1812–1895) and George Hamilton Ayliffe (1810–1844).

- Henry Charles Hamilton Ayliffe (18 June 1846 – 10 March 1916) trained as a solicitor, articled to H. C. Palmer, then with Matthews & Cox, before going into solo practice in Adelaide in 1881. He married Leonora Mary Bryant (c. 1861 – 25 July 1924) in 1884

- Ernest Henry Ayliffe (24 May 1885 – ) married Annie Terese Dunne ( – ) on 21 October 1915
- Robert Hamilton Ayliffe (13 October 1893 – 1 May 1959) married Alfena Janet "Fena" Withers ( –1975) on 24 April 1922
- George Bryant Ayliffe (10 March 1897 – 29 June 1916) with 1st AIF. Fought at Gallipoli, killed in action in France.
- Grace Lily Ayliffe (30 October 1900 – 1990) married Vivian Rhodes Millhouse on 8 June 1927.

- Robin Millhouse QC (9 December 1929 – 28 April 2017)

- Francis William John Ayliffe (10 March 1848 – 8 January 1850)-->
- Charlotte Elizabeth Ayliffe (4 January 1850 – 1915) gave evidence at her mother's inquest.
- Clara Blanche Ayliffe (10 January 1854 – 11 December 1896) married Edmund Cliffe Brown ( – ) on 14 November 1878
- Ellen Esther Cecelia Ayliffe (8 September 1857 – 9 September 1940). She was a provisional teacher at Dalkey Hill in 1891, and taught at Daveyston near Greenock from 1900 or earlier to 1916 or later, and for a time at Hanson. She was present at the "Back to Daveyston" and "Back to Hanson" celebrations of 1936.
