= Stockyard Creek =

Stockyard Creek may refer to:

- Stockyard Creek, South Australia, a former town north of Hamley Bridge
- Foster, Victoria is a town in Gippsland that was known as Stockyard Creek before 1879
- Stockyard Creek (New South Wales) is a tributary of the Macleay River
- Stockyard Creek (Western Australia)
- Stockyard Creek (Victoria) is a tributary of the Howqua River
