= Hamley Bridge, South Australia =

Hamley Bridge
- Town
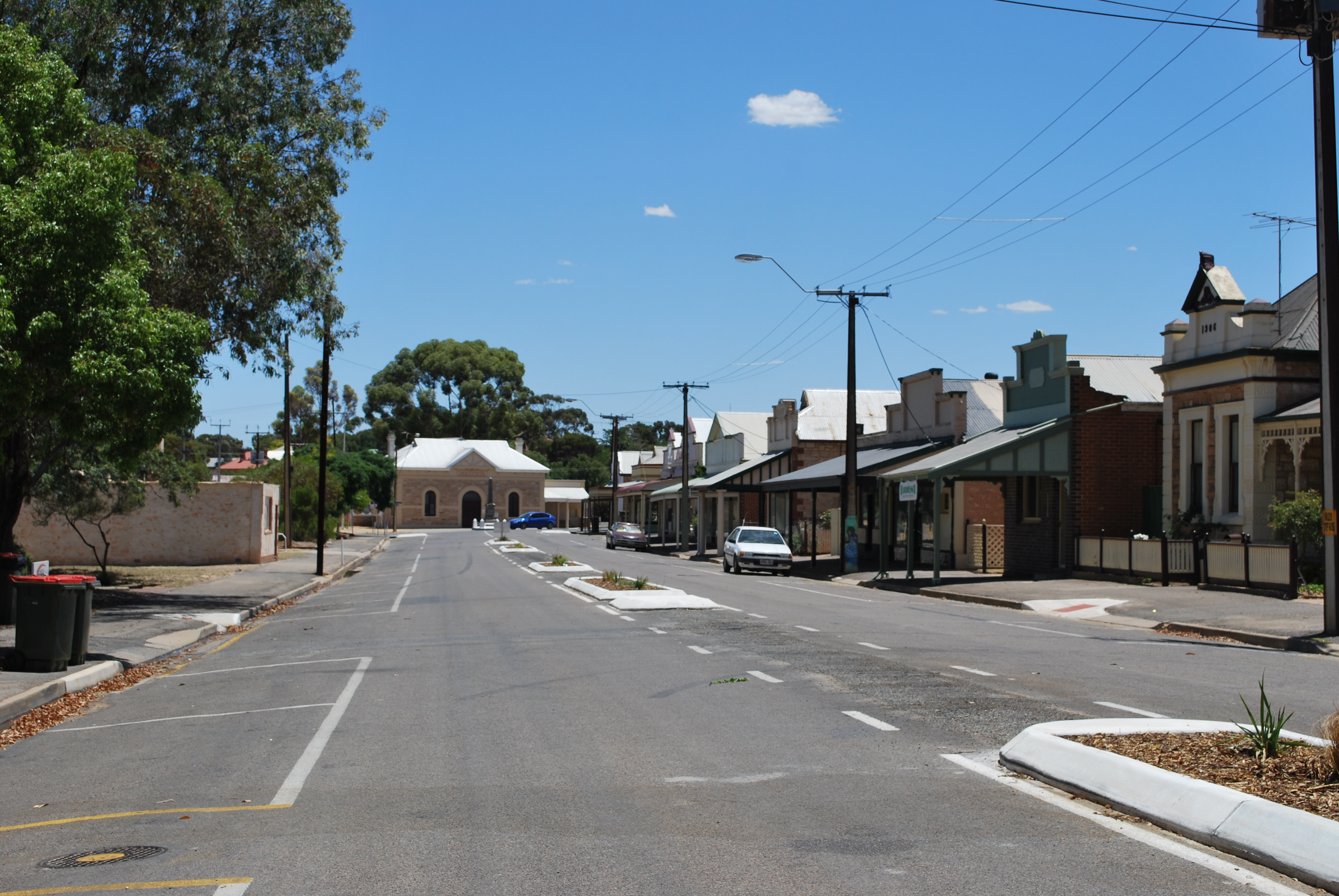
- Light St in Hamley Bridge

- Coordinates: 34°21′0″S 138°41′0″E
- Country: Australia
- State: South Australia
- LGAs: Wakefield Regional Council; Light Regional Council
- Location: 78 km (48 mi) N of Adelaide
- Established: 1860s

Government
  - State electorate: Goyder, Light
  - Federal division: Grey

Population
  - Total: 615 (UCL 2021)
- Postcode: 5401
Localities around Hamley Bridge
Stockyard Creek, Owen	Alma	Tarlee
Barabba	Hamley Bridge	Stockport, Linwood
Pinkerton Plains	Magdala	Morn Hill

Hamley Bridge is a community in South Australia located at the junction of the Gilbert and Light rivers, as well as the site of a former railway junction.

Named by the government of the day, in honour of the Acting Governor of South Australia Lieutenant-Colonel Francis Gilbert Hamley, whose wife, Lady Edith Hamley laid the foundation stone of the River Light Railway Bridge on 25 July 1868. This bridge carries the Peterborough railway line over the Light River.

Other settlements in the area had commenced in the early 1860s, and it was not until 1868 that the junction of the two rivers came under notice as a possible site for a township.

== Railway ==
The Peterborough railway line was built from a new junction at Roseworthy (north of Gawler on what was then the Morgan railway line) to Tarlee during 1868. A bridge was required over the River Light. The bridge was 300 feet (91 m) long and 80 feet (24 m) high, in two spans on stone abutments and a cast iron cylindrical pier 6 feet (1.8 m) in diameter. This bridge was replaced in 1925 in conjunction with the works to convert the narrow gauge line to broad gauge, despite this bridge already being broad gauge.

Elevation is 374 feet (114 m).

=== Break of gauge difficulty ===
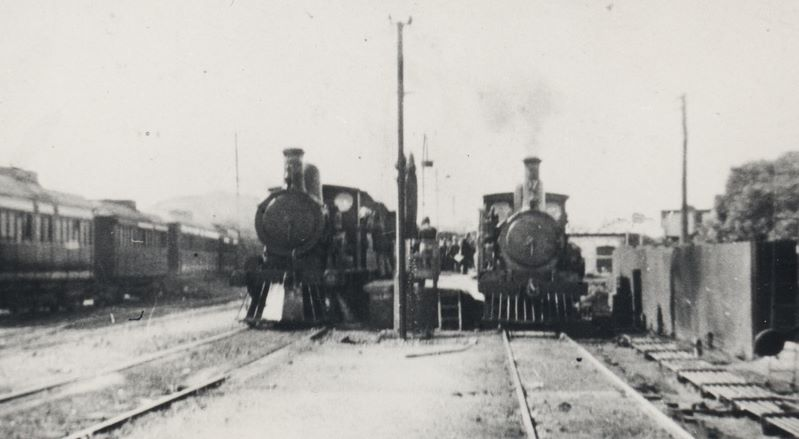
Different gauges at Hamley Bridge: on the left a broad gauge S class locomotive and on the right a narrow gauge Y class locomotive

The original railway through the town was 5 ft 3 in (1,600 mm). In 1880, a junction at Balaklava on the narrow gauge Port Wakefield railway line created the Balaklava railway line through Owen to meet the broad gauge line at Hamley Bridge. This was built to 3 ft 6 in (1,067 mm), so Hamley Bridge was a break of gauge station rather than a junction.

A new railway station was established a few hundred metres north of the original in 1880 and was at first known as Alma Railway Station. The stone building, occupied as a private residence today, represents the fine architecture of the era and is heritage listed along with the signal box and water tanks, and two of the bridges over the River Light.

As Hamley Bridge is only 40 miles (64.4 km) from the capital and major port, this break of gauge soon became a sore point, leading lobbying over decades to extend the narrow gauge all the way to the capital and that port. Trains reaching Hamley Bridge may have travelled 600 miles (965.6 km) from Oodnadatta, thus illustrating the poor design of this break of gauge. The break of gauge at Hamley Bridge was very cramped and poorly sited due to rivers, bridges, gradients and curves, which were difficult to improve upon. There were also shunting delays and a shortage of trucks. A counter proposal to ease congestion at the inadequate facilities at the Hamley Bridge break of gauge was to shift the break of gauge northwards to Balaklava, was strongly opposed. Alternately, the break of gauge may have been moved northwards to Owen

Hamley Bridge ceased to be a break of gauge station in 1927 when narrow gauge lines as far north as Gladstone were converted to broad gauge, Gladstone becoming a break of gauge station in lieu.

Regular passenger services ceased in December 1986. Freight trains continued to use the line until October 2005.

24-hour per day operation was made possible by the installation of floodlighting in 1908.

== Media ==
Hamley Bridge was home to the short-lived Hamley Bridge Express (3-31 October 1908), which was printed in parallel with Owen's Weekly and Dalkey District Courier (3 October – 21 November 1908) by T.W. Broadway. Each was printed in their respective town, and with different mastheads but the same content.

The town also produced the Junction News (16 February 1940 – 3 May 1946), which became Junction News and Owen Post (10 May 1946 – 28 July 1967). The newspaper's original distribution included: Hamley Bridge, Riverton, Saddleworth, Marrabel, Manoora, Black Springs, Auburn, Waterloo, Tarlee, Stockport, Owen, Alma, Wasleys, and Barabba. After merging with a Riverton newspaper, the Gilbert Valley News (1 July 1965 – 27 July 1967), the newspaper's numbering was restarted as the Junction and Gilbert Valley News (4 August 1967 – 30 January 1969). It was then merged into The Bunyip, located in Gawler.

== Music ==
Hamley Bridge is the Hometown of the band "From Dusk Till Dawn (AU)"

== Religion ==
The Catholic Church in Hamley Bridge is dedicated to Our Lady of the Nativity.

== Sports ==
Hamley Bridge had a cricket team named for the Break-Of-Gauge.

Hamley Bridge Bombers are the local Australian Rules Football team and one of the oldest in the region, dating back to 1907.

Between 1956 and 1969, Hamley Bridge was home to the Bell Bay Speedway. The speedway ran a variety of classes including Speedcars, TQ's, and Stock Cars. The speedway closed in 1969 due to rising costs and a lack of volunteers able to help run the venue. One local legend about its closure was because the then Mayor of Gawler was a regular competitor and didn't take kindly to rolling his Stock Car at the speedway.

== Notable people ==
- Luke McCabe, Adelaide Rules Footballer - Hawthorn and Central District (2005 SANFL Premiership and Jack Oatey Medallist)
- Garnet Hornby Saunders (1880–1943), New Zealand shoemaker, musician, cinema proprietor and businessman
