= Templers, South Australia =

Templers South Australia
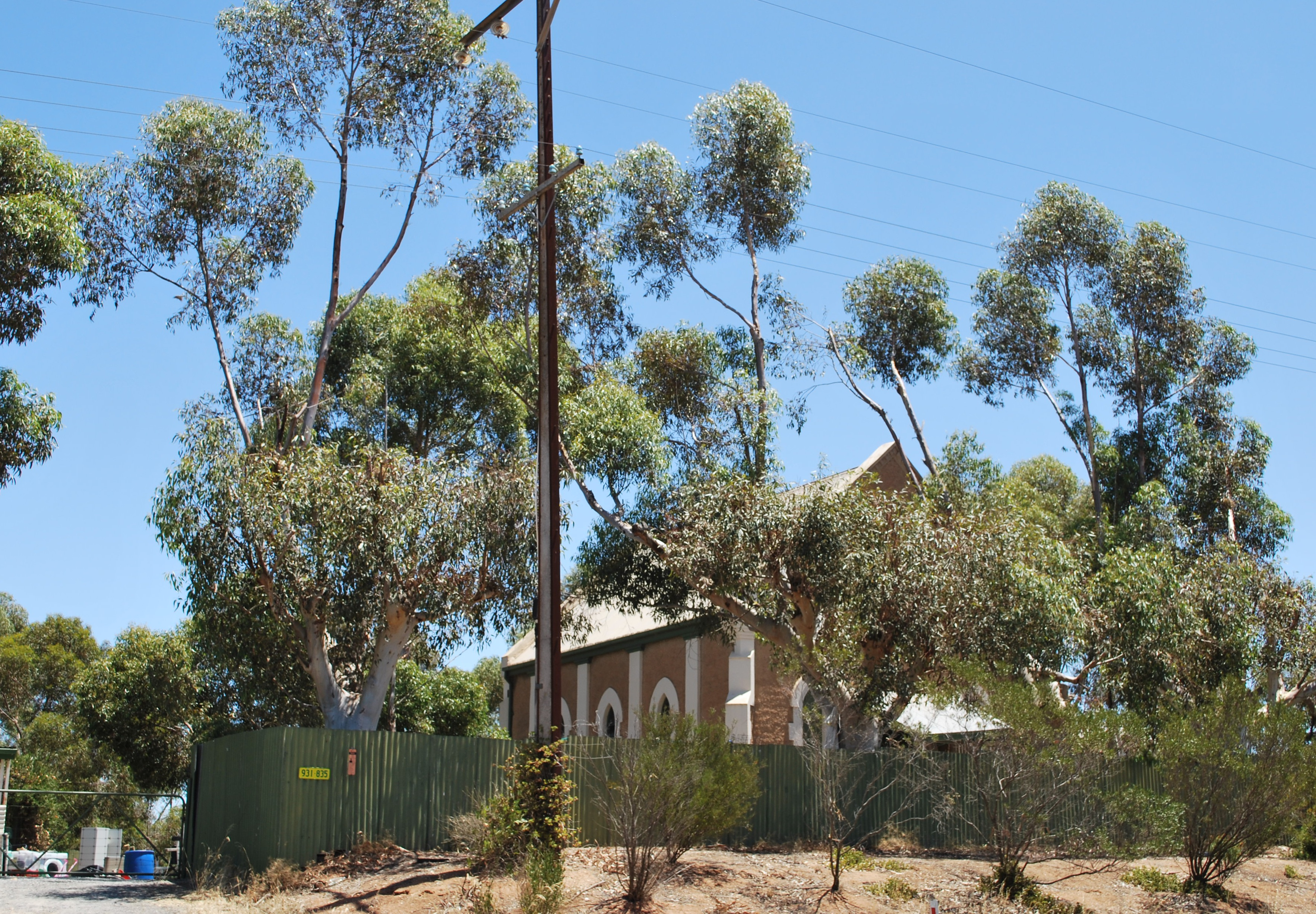
- A former church at Templers

- Coordinates: 34°28′S 138°44′E
- Population: 138 (SAL 2021)
- Postcode(s): 5371
- Elevation: 149 m (489 ft)
- Time zone: ACST (UTC+9:30)
  - Summer (DST): ACDT (UTC+10:30)
- LGA(s): Light Regional Council
- State electorate(s): Light
- Federal division(s): Barker; Grey
Localities around Templers:
Magdala	Morn Hill
Wasleys	Templers	Freeling
	Roseworthy

Templers (postcode 5371) is a small town on the Horrocks Highway north of Gawler, South Australia. The town was named after William Templer who, with his wife Martha, was the licensee of the North Star hotel in the area from 1846 to 1878.

The Templers Primary School opened in 1873, but has since closed.

The Mount Bethel Wesleyan Jubilee chapel was built in 1863 (completed 1864) by a people who had been meeting regularly in homes and sheds for worship since the early 1850s. It was initially part of the Gawler circuit. From 1870 it was part of a circuit consisting of Templers, Wasleys, Freeling and Sheaoak Log, with Stockport added from 1880.
