= H. T. Whittell =

Medical doctor

Horatio Thomas Whittell MD., MRCS. (1826 – 21 August 1899), generally referred to as H. T. Whittell or H. Thomas Whittell, was a medical doctor in South Australia and Adelaide's City Coroner.

== Biography ==
Whittell was born in Warwick, England, and had a happy childhood. He was educated at one of the private schools in Leamington Spa. At age nineteen he entered Queen's College, Birmingham, to study medicine and in his spare time read books about legal cases. He received his diploma as a member of the Royal College of Surgeons, and served some time as house surgeon at Queen's Hospital. He spent ten years practising in Birmingham, then obtained his M.D. degree at Aberdeen.

He arrived in Adelaide in May 1858 and was soon an active member of the Total Abstinence Society.He had a very busy practice, first operating from his home on Grenfell Street, near the Sturt Hotel, then ten years later on North Terrace. Adelaide experienced an outbreak of diphtheria around July to September 1859, and Whittell, who had had some experience of an epidemic in England shortly before he left, was kept busy. By a remarkable piece of timing, his booklet on the disease appeared in the bookshops in August that year. He initially had a solo practice, then after the death of Dr. Anton Bayer in 1866, joined his erstwhile partner Dr. William Gosse (c. 1813–1883) in partnership for about six years then returned to a solo practice. In 1879, suffering perhaps from overwork, he took on Dr. J. Davies Thomas (c. 1845–1893) as a partner. At the end of that year he sold the practice to Dr. Thomas, and sought recuperation in an extended trip to Europe. He remained in Europe for two and a half years, and became vitally interested in the recent microbial discoveries and developed a passion for microscopy. He associated with the leading microscopical men at the time when bacteriology was beginning to have a marked effect upon the views of the pathologists in London. He met Robert Koch and Louis Pasteur, the great scientists whose discoveries were attracting worldwide attention, and made a lasting impression on Whittell.

Whittell succeeded Gosse as President of the Central Board of Health on 20 August 1883, and applied microscopy to the solution of many problems of public sanitation. In January 1886, as part of a series of retrenchments, he was appointed Registrar of Births, Marriages and Deaths to replace J. F. Cleland. This was in addition to his Board of Health duties without any addition to his salary. On the (perhaps forced) resignation of Thomas Ward (1815 – 28 December 1888) in October 1888, Whittell was appointed City Coroner on top of his duties at the Central Board of Health, and in addition was made Vaccination Officer and Inspector of Anatomy. Despite his multiple roles, Whittell was being seriously discussed by Parliament for retrenchment. He was replaced as Registrar General of Births, Deaths and Marriages by George Hamilton Ayliffe, grandson of Dr. Thomas Hamilton Ayliffe, in January 1889.

It was perhaps as City Coroner that Dr. Whittell rendered the greatest official service to the colony. This is a job which on top of medical knowledge is required a great deal of tact and sensitivity, qualities which the obituarist declares, Whittell had in abundance, together with a working knowledge of the law. He was also considerate of witnesses, never allowing an inquest to extend into a second day if it could be dealt with in one.

He died peacefully after a few months' illness; his remains were buried at the West Terrace Cemetery. His wife died of pneumonia a few months later, and his son may have been written out of his will, as the bulk of his estate was inherited by his daughter Anna.

=== Other interests ===
- For ten years he was a member of the Board of Management of the Adelaide Hospital, and served as an Honorary Surgeon, and did much to increase the standing of the nursing profession. Dr. Moore at that time was Colonial Surgeon.
- He was a member of the University Council in the days when it was a nominee body. He also served as Examiner in Hygiene.
- His home laboratory on East Terrace was one of the best equipped in the colony for microscopic studies.
- He was Deputy Chairman of the South Australian Branch of the A.M.P. Society
- He was on the Board of Governors of the Public Library
- He was an active Mason, and held rank as a Past Deputy Grand Master in the Grand Lodge of Freemasons in South Australia, and a prominent member of the Lodge of Harmony, and a Past Principal of the Royal Arch Chapter.
- He was a founder of the Field Naturalists' Section of the Royal Society, and inaugural Vice-President.

== Publications ==
- Whittell, H. T. (1859) Practical Observations on Diphtheria, pub. Shawyer, Gawler Place; price One shilling

== Family ==
Whittell married Caroline ?? ( – 8 October 1899) on 3 August 1848. They had a son and a daughter:

- Henry Lloyd Whittell (1855 – 17 October 1937) married Vincentia Maria Lucas of Adelaide on 19 May 1879. He was a solicitor of Montefiore Chambers, Waymouth Street, Adelaide. He left for Melbourne in 1877 and was subsequently charged with misappropriating £1,000 and brought back to Adelaide. The matter was brushed aside as an "innocent mistake", to the cynical amusement of journalist "A. Pencil". and moved to West Maitland, New South Wales, where he was elected as councillor, then in 1899 charged with theft of several cheques, but found not guilty. He moved to Penrith near Sydney, where in 1909 he again ran foul of the law and was fined.
- Anna Maria Prince Whittell ( – 22 July 1930) married singer Richard Nitschke on 16 January 1902 in London, where they lived for the next 30 years.

They had a home on East Terrace, Adelaide.

There is no reason to believe he was related to H. M. Whittell, the great Australian ornithologist.
