= Moritz Heuzenroeder =

Australian musician

Moritz Heuzenroeder (15 July 1849 – 10 November 1897) was a pianist, composer and teacher of music born in Germany who had a substantial career in South Australia.

== History ==
Moritz Heuzenroeder was born in Ottersberg the youngest son of Dr. Ferdinand Anton Joseph Leopold (known as Joseph Leopold) Heuzenroeder, a prominent Sanitätsrat (medical practitioner) originally from Duderstadt, and from early childhood was preoccupied with performing music.

He left Germany for South Australia some time before 1871 and settled in Gawler, where for a year or two he conducted a jeweller's shop, but he had a greater love for music, and returned to Germany for three or four years to further study piano under Dr. Sebert, gaining Royal Academy of Stuttgart qualifications, and studying voice production. On his return he settled in Adelaide and advertised himself as a teacher of singing; the baritone Richard Nitschke and singing teacher Minna Fischer were two of his pupils.

He was a friend of Hermann Schrader, who considered him a musical genius.

He founded an orchestra at Tanunda, and a choral society at Angaston.

He moved from Adelaide to Tanunda early in 1897; he died unexpectedly the same year. He never married.

=== Family ===
The Heuzenroeder family in South Australia was quite large and widespread. Four of Moritz's uncles also migrated:

- Carl Joseph Anton Jodicus (known as Carl) born 1800 in Duderstadt - a pharmacist in Blumberg (Birdwood)
- Moritz Joseph Hieronymus (known as Moritz Joseph) born 1807 in Duderstadt - a pharmacist in Adelaide and Tanunda
- Maximilian Edmund, born about 1814 in Duderstadt
- Franz Joseph Theodor Heinrich (known as Heinrich or Henry) born 1819 in Duderstadt - a pharmacist in Adelaide

as did Moritz's brother Johann Theodor "Theo" Heuzenroeder (1841 – 27 October 1893). Theo was born in Schwanewede, and emigrated to South Australia in 1859, married Mathilde Louise Martha Fiedler (c. 1842 – 20 March 1893) in 1867 and had eight children, was a pharmacist in Adelaide, then Hahndorf, then Tanunda from 1866. Moritz Ernst Heuzenroeder (3 August 1871 – 1948), another pharmacist, who, in 1903, married Margarethe Hermione Wendt, daughter of J. M. Wendt, was a son.

Uncle Heinrich "Henry" Heuzenroeder (c. 1819–1898) who arrived December 1847 on Hermann von Beckerath, was a partner with brother Moritz J. Heuzenroeder in a chemist's shop at 50 Rundle Street then took it over. He was a noted coin collector.

Moritz Joseph Heuzenroeder, who migrated on the Heerjeebhoy Rustomjee Patel, arriving in SA September 1845, established pharmacy at 50 Rundle Street, then established Tanunda pharmacy in 1849. His nephew Joseph took over shop when Moritz died 1864, but liquidated in 1866, selling to Johann Theodore Heuzenroeder, his first cousin.

=== Compositions ===
He composed operettas Singvogelchen ("Singing bird") and Onkel Beckers Geschichte ("Uncle Becker's Story"), which were performed in 1882 and the parody Faust and Gretchen, to libretto by Richard Jaentsch, 1883, all performed at the Albert Hall, Pirie Street, Adelaide, by the Deutscher Männer Gesang Verein. In 1886, he founded the Adelaide Harmonie Society, which in 1891 first performed The Windmill, his operetta in two acts, the text of which was translated from the French of Mélesville. Soloists were Minna Schrader, Blanche Frances, A. Duncan, G. Dumel-Denger, H. Adams, P. Bartels, and F. H. Stokes. He resigned from the Society in 1890, to be replaced by G. Vollmar, followed by T. H. Jones then Hermann Heinicke. He composed the comic opera Immomeena (libretto by Harry Congreve Evans of the Quiz), first performed in 1893, of which the song The Green Little Isle of the Sea achieved some popularity.

He composed songsThou art my Queen with words by educationist Alfred Edward Maegraith (father of tropical medicine researcher Brian Gilmore Maegraith, cartoonist Kerwin Maegraith and war hero Hugh Maegraith), first performed in 1890 by Richard Nitschke, and Australia, with words by C. C. Presgrave (better known as a painter and prominent member of the Adelaide Easel Club), again promoted by R. Nitschke.
