= Hampton Gleeson =

Australian politician

Hampton Carroll Gleeson (31 August 1834 – 10 April 1907) was a pastoralist and politician in the young colony of South Australia. He was later involved in the business of brewing beer in the neighbouring colony of New South Wales.

== History ==
Hampton was the eldest son of John Hampton Gleeson, who with his brother Edward Burton Gleeson and their families emigrated to South Australia from Calcutta on the Emerald Isle, arriving in July 1838. The voyage was organised by the Australian Association of Bengal, and besides the two Gleeson families and a few other settlers (notably Judge James Donnithorne) and their servants, the ship carried a number of Indian coolies, a large quantity of Indian merchandise and horses, including "Abdallah", an Arab stallion brought out by E. B. Gleeson for breeding purposes. There were (unspecified) problems with the Emerald Isle and her master. The Association's other ship, the Guillardon, was wrecked at the mouth of the Ganges in 1840, and no further ships were despatched.

The Gleesons established a pastoral property north of Penwortham, on which Edward Burton Gleeson developed a township, naming it Clare. John Hampton Gleeson died in 1840, when his son was barely six years old.

Somehow he received on excellent education and developed a keen business sense, perhaps at his uncle's property "Inchiquin" near Clare. In 1860 he took a business trip to India, bringing back as a curio several pairs of "mangouste" or "ichneumon" (mongoose), which he presented to Mr. Elliott (his landlord at the Globe Inn) and to the Botanic Garden. He secured a contract to supply a consignment of horses to India and in the same year entered into partnership with W. D. Kingsmill as station agents, with offices in Gilbert Place, Adelaide.

He was active in a number of mining ventures in the northern Flinders Ranges: New Cornwall Mineral Association Ltd. in 1861, Duryea Mining Company in 1862, and was managing director of the Daly and Stanley Mining Company in 1868. He secured an Auctioneers licence in 1864.

In 1869 he was appointed Justice of the Peace. He was elected to the S.A. Parliament as Member for Flinders, serving from April 1870 to December 1871, his colleague being Alfred Watts.

He moved to New South Wales, and was a founder in 1874, with W. K. Simms and Edgar Chapman, of the "Adelaide Brewery" in Waverley, the firm later known as Burrows and Gleeson, which took over Charles Mallon's "Waverley Brewery" in 1876. In 1876 the brewery was largely destroyed by flood; an interim arrangement with Tooheys Brewery to fill their orders resulted in that firm gaining a toehold in the area which they never lost. Gleeson was also associated with Marshall's Brewery.

He died at his home "Juliette", 44A Bayswater Road, Darlinghurst

He was a member of Sydney Tattersalls Club and its treasurer in the last years of his life.

== Family ==
John Hampton Gleeson ( – 4 September 1840) and his wife née Carroll had a family which included:

- Harriet Gleeson (c. 1833 – 27 March 1882)
- Hampton Carroll Gleeson (31 August 1834 – 10 April 1907) married Susan Mary McEllister (c. 1839 – 20 May 1887), daughter of Edward McEllister, on 15 November 1860. Their five sons and two daughters children include:

- Edward William Gleeson (17 October 1861 – ). He worked with E.S.& A. Bank before founding his own clothing store.
- Mabel Mary Gleeson (22 January 1883 – ) married Walter James Leonard on 6 February 1905
He married again, to Ida Josephson ( – ) on 4 May 1888. She was the daughter of Isaac Josephson of Macquarie Street, Sydney. He was buried in the Catholic section of the Waverley cemetery.

- Sara Gleeson ( – ) married Dr. Arthur Newnham Bewicke ( – ) of Melrose on 18 April 1865. They left for England on the Orient in February 1874, never to return.

John Hampton Gleeson's brother Edward Burton "Paddy" Gleeson (c. 1801 – 2 February 1870) founder of Clare, married Harriet Llewellyn (c. 1799 – 6 June 1896) arrived in South Australia from India aboard the Emerald Isle, with three children in July 1838.
