= Jack Nitschke =

Australian cricketer

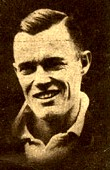

Personal information
- Born: 14 April 1905; Adelaide, South Australia, Australia
- Died: 29 September 1982 (aged 77); North Adelaide, South Australia
- Batting: Left-handed

International information
- National side: Australia
- Test debut (cap 137): 27 November 1931 v South Africa
- Last Test: 18 December 1931 v South Africa

Career statistics
Competition	Test	First-class
Matches	2	45
Runs scored	53	3,320
Batting average	26.50	42.02
100s/50s	0/0	9/16
Top score	47	172
Catches/stumpings	3/0	22/0
- Source: Cricinfo, 9 September 2022

Homesdale Carl Nitschke, often misspelt as Holmesdale, and also known as Jack, Sling or Slinger (14 April 1905 – 29 September 1982), was an Australian cricketer.

== Early life and family ==
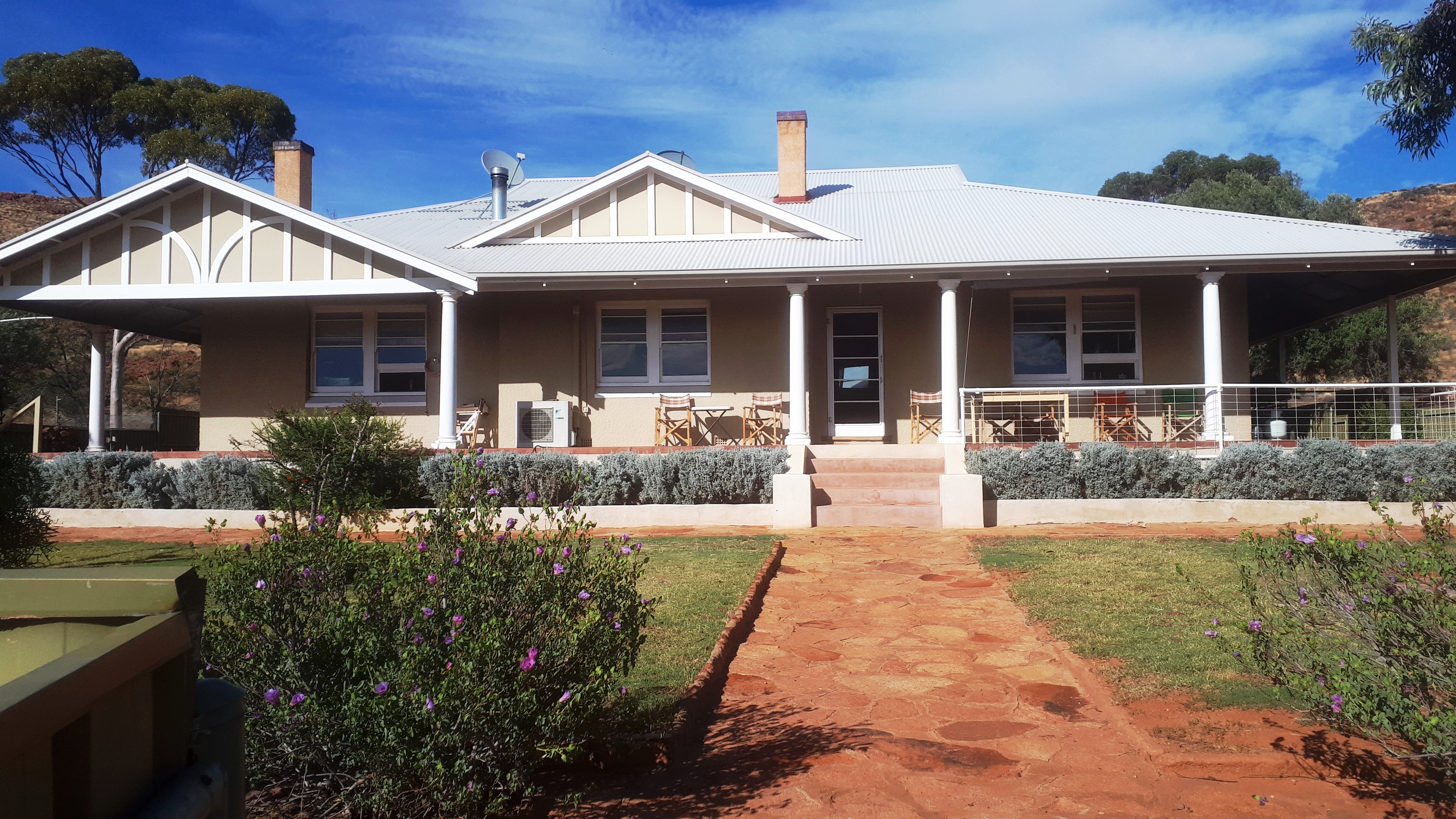
Homestead on Hiltaba Station

Born on 14 April 1905 in Adelaide, South Australia, Homesdale Nitschke was the son of Carl Hermann Wilhelm Luder Richard "C. H." Nitschke (1866–1922). C.H. bought Hiltaba sheep station in the Gawler Ranges in 1918, and Homesdale ran it for some time. He built the current homestead in 1936, before his marriage.

His uncle, Richard Nitschke, was a famous baritone. Nitschke's grandfather Wilhelm Nitschke (c. 1817–1889) was the founding owner of the Hackney Distillery.

== Career ==
Described by E.W. Swanton as "a left-handed bat of belligerent inclinations", Nitschke played in only two Tests; against South Africa in Brisbane and Sydney in 1931, and could probably be considered unlucky to have arrived at his best years at the same time as cricketing greats such as Don Bradman, Bill Ponsford, Bill Woodfull, Archie Jackson, Stan McCabe and Alan Kippax.

He had far more impressive statistics in domestic first-class cricket where he scored 3,320 runs at an average of 42.03, including nine centuries.

== Later life and death ==
Nitschke was a successful racehorse breeder, with "Dayana" winning the Perth Cup in 1973, and the derbies of four states in 1972.

He died on 29 September 1982 in North Adelaide.

== Sources ==
- Melford, M. (1984) Daily Telegraph Cricket Year Book 84, Daily Telegraph: London. ISBN 0 86367 000 8.
