= Garnet Hornby Saunders =

Garnet Hornby Saunders (1880–1943) was a notable New Zealand shoemaker, musician, cinema proprietor and businessman. He was born in Hamley Bridge, South Australia, Australia in 1880.
