= Richard Nitschke =

Richard Carl Wilhelm Nitschke (1863 – 2 June 1944) was a South Australian baritone and in later years a racehorse owner.

== History ==
Nitschke was born in Adelaide the second son of Wilhelm Nitschke (c. 8 August 1816 – 3 August 1889) and his wife Elise Catharine Nitschke, née Mehrtens ( – 1909).

Wilhelm Nitschke arrived in South Australia aboard Wilhelmina Maria from Germany in August 1849, and Elise Catharine Mehrtens arrived from Germany aboard Herder in September 1851 with her four sisters. They married in 1853. Prior to leaving Europe Wilhelm was a coppersmith involved in construction of distillation plants. He was the first person in the colony to manufacture ice, and set up an ice manufactory in Mauritius which with his house was destroyed by fire, and unfortunately for Nitschke, uninsured. After some fifteen years of building stills for wineries, set up his own business "Nitschke & Co." at 109 Hindley Street, producing grape spirit. He founded a distillery in Kent Town which by 1877 was producing prize-winning brandies and other spirits, and around that time moved to Hackney, between the Hackney Bridge and St Peter's College and became well known as the Hackney Distillery. He was one of the founders of the Adelaide Liedertafel and a prominent member of the German Club. Their home at 69 Hackney Road, "Schweitzen Haus", was later home of aesthete Patricia Hackett, left to her partner Dr. A. M. Mocatta, who willed it to the National Trust which controversially sold it in 1994.

Richard was educated at E. P. Nesbit's North Adelaide Educational Institution from 1873 or earlier, followed by Pulteney Street School, then St. Peter's College, perhaps only for the year 1878. He studied singing under W. R. Pybus (1848–1917); his public singing began by contributing items at Town Hall concerts in 1882 and 1883, and diverse entertainments such as the Kent Town Wesleyan Band of Hope in 1884, the Adelaide Yorick Club and a benefit for the Home for Incurables at the (Adelaide) Albert Hall in 1885 and a German Shooting Club social in 1886. It is unlikely that he was paid for any of these performances. He frequently appeared at the "Saturday Night Pops" in the Town Hall organised by P. A. Howell; some other notable contributors being Ada Crossley, Armes Beaumont, Bert Holder and organist Dr. Harold Davies, later director of the Elder Conservatorium. His repertoire consisted mostly of "drawing room ballads" such as Never More (Mattei) and Queen of the Earth, Bedouin Love Song and Good Night (Pinsuti), and patriotic songs, which constituted the popular music of the period, more than the classical and operatic canon. He was often called on to contribute to concerts farewelling visiting artists such as R. Squarise, Charles Santley, Lili Sharp and Lucy Stevenson, when he might include compositions by fellow South Australian Moritz Heuzenroeder such as The Vision, Thou Art My Queen or Margaretha. In June 1891 it was Nitschke's turn to be farewelled when he left with Richart Stewart, jun. on an Australian tour of Heuzenroeder's operetta The Windmill.

With the death of his parents, he became a part-owner of the distillery, along with his brothers Gustav Wilhelm "Gus" Nitschke (1859–1936) and Carl Hermann Wilhelm Luder Richard "C. H." Nitschke (1866–1922).

In 1901 he moved to London where in 1902 he married Anna Whittell ( – 22 July 1930), daughter of Dr. H. T. Whittell, of Adelaide; they lived in London for nearly 30 years; Anna died in 1930 and Nitschke returned to Adelaide.

== Notable performances ==
Nitschke sang "The Song of Australia" as a duet with Peter Dawson in 1905.

== Later life ==
"Dick" Nitschke was one of South Australia's more prominent racehorse owners. His stable included Pirasto, which raced in 1935 and 1936, Scoran which raced in 1939 and 1940 and Mona Meg in 1941.

== Family ==
Wilhelm Nitschke (c. 8 August 1816 – 3 August 1889) married Elise Catharine Mehrtens ( –1909) in 1853. They had three sons:

- Gustav Wilhelm "Gus" Nitschke (1859 – 2 February 1936) married Rosetta Jane Ladd ( –1951) in 1900
- Richard Nitschke (1863 – 2 June 1944) married Anna Maria Prince Whittell ( – 17 June 1930) in London on 16 January 1902. She was the only daughter of Dr. Horatio Thomas Whittell (c. 1826 – 21 August 1899) and Caroline Whittell (1826 – 8 October 1899) of Adelaide. Their home for most of their life together was in Bayswater, London. They had no children.
- Carl Hermann Wilhelm Luder Richard "C. H." Nitschke (1866–1922) was a highly regarded piano accompanist

- Homesdale Christopher "Sling" Nitschke (1905–1982), cricketer.
