= Linwood, South Australia =

Linwood South Australia
- Coordinates: 34.360°S 138.767°E
- Population: 41 (SAL 2021)
- Location: 25 km (16 mi) north of Gawler
- LGA(s): Light Regional Council
- State electorate(s): Schubert
- Federal division(s): Barker; Grey
Localities around Linwood:
Stockport		Bethel
Hamley Bridge	Linwood	Fords
Magdala	Morn Hill	Freeling

Linwood is a settlement in South Australia. It is in the Mid North region and spans the Horrocks Highway (Main North Road) halfway between Templers and Tarlee on the southern bank of the Light River in the Hundred of Light. The wooden bridge over the River Light was washed away in a flood in 1889. A new, higher, stone bridge was opened in 1891.

The public school at Linwood was referred to as the "Hundred of Light School" after it opened in 1903. There was also a Methodist church and a post office. None remain in use.
