= Hamilton's Ewell Vineyards =

Australian Winery

Coordinates: 34°55′35″S 138°35′52″E

Hamilton's Ewell Vineyards was a winery founded by Richard Hamilton (1792–1852) in the early days of the colony of South Australia.

== History ==
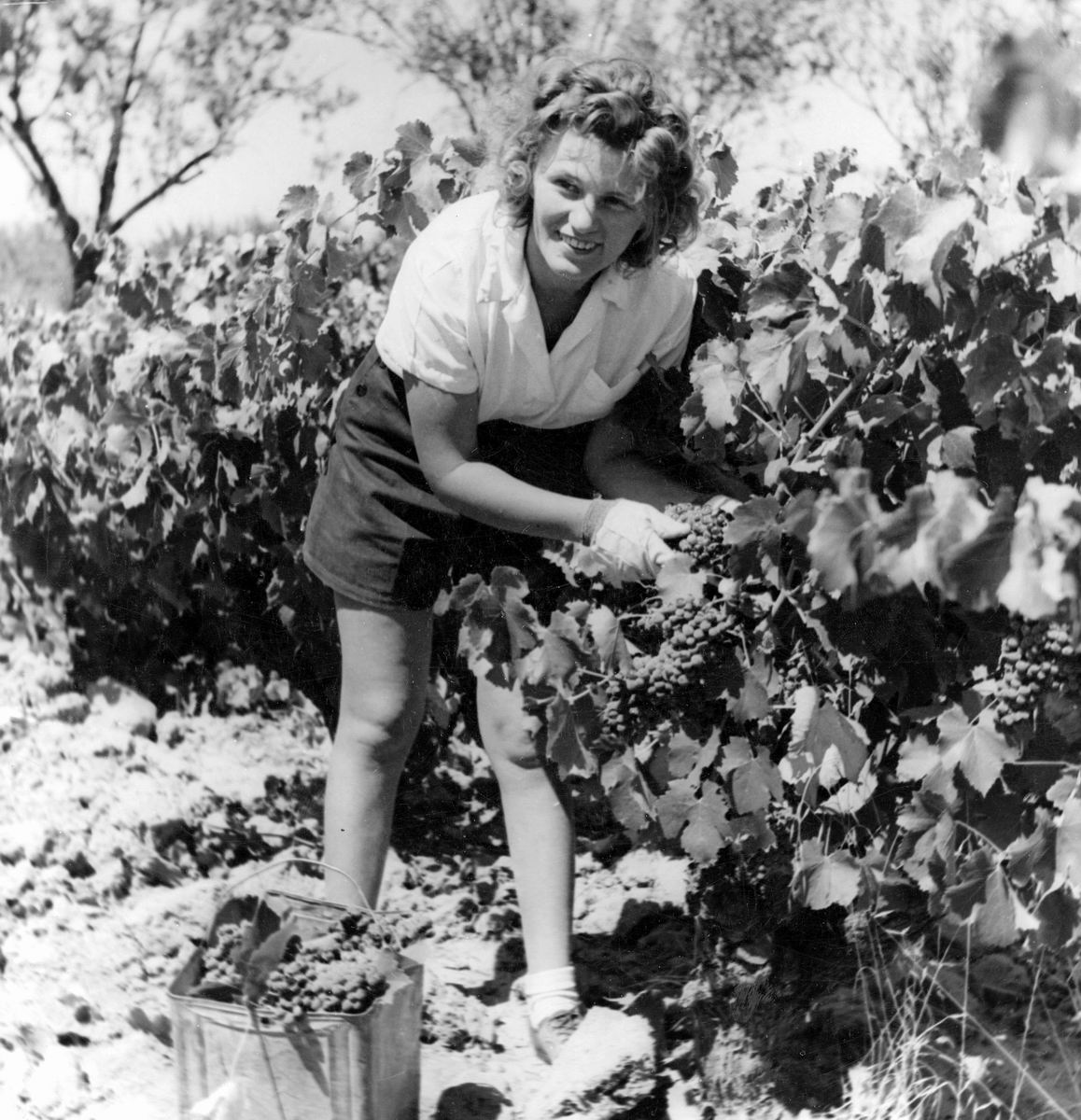
Grape picking at Hamilton's Vineyard

Richard Hamilton (18 February 1792 – 13 August 1852), a tailor of Dover, Kent, was owner of property on Long Island, New York, which he sold in 1837 to purchase an 80 acres (32 ha) section in Glenelg, South Australia. He emigrated with his wife and their seven children aboard Katherine Stewart Forbes, arriving in Adelaide on 17 October 1837, and set about establishing a farm. By 1840 "Ewell Farm", named after the farm he had at Ewell near Dover which is now known as Temple Ewell, Kent, incorporated a vineyard covering 5 acres (2 ha), planted with vine cuttings he had purchased in South Africa en route to Australia.

A son, Henry Hamilton (6 January 1826 – 10 February 1907), remained in England, where he was a student at a Christ's Hospital bluecoat school, then emigrated aboard Christina in 1841 and for two years worked on a sheep station near Burra. He purchased a property in Oaklands adjoining his father's property, built a house and settled there. He inherited his father's Glenelg property, but it was disposed of within his lifetime.

He suffered from ill-health in his later years, and handed over management of Ewell Vineyards, to his son F E "Frank" Hamilton (5 February 1859 – 13 June 1913 — a Friday) in 1890. Frank served on Marion Council for many years. Ewell Vineyards at this time covered 156 acres (63 ha), as well as groves of almonds and other fruit. Frank married Violet Ayliffe (1 February 1875 – 1 February 1865) on 17 September 1895. She was a granddaughter of Dr. George Hamilton Ayliffe.

Their eldest son (Frank) Eric Hamilton (4 July 1896 – May 1967) took over management of the company, with Sydney (18 July 1898 – 22 July 1987), another son, as winemaker. They rebuilt the winery and installed a distillery. They restructured the company as Hamilton's Ewell Vineyards Pty. Ltd. in 1934.

Eric's son Robert (27 May 1926 – 8 January 1976) became chairman of directors in 1967, while his brother Sydney Hamilton was winemaker at Ewell.

== The wines ==
Hamiltons Ewell vineyards were planted with red (Grenache) and white (Pedro Ximenes) wine grapes for wines they marketed as Chablis and Moselle. In 1841 the vineyard produced South Australia's first commercial wine. With the installation of pot stills they were able to specialize in fortified wines, notably Sauterne, and brandy. In 1958 the company purchased the Bridgewater Mill (built for John Dunn), which they used for maturation of their table wines and as a bond store for brandy spirit. Petaluma Wines purchased the Mill in 1986.

== Demise of the original Ewell vineyards ==
From the 1950s, with the spread of suburban Adelaide, the company sold off large swathes of land, much to the South Australian Housing Trust for "austerity housing". In 1968 30 acres (12 ha) was compulsorily acquired for creation of Glengowrie High School, which closed and was demolished in 1991 to make way for a retirement estate. The school body was amalgamated with Mitchell Park High to form Hamilton Secondary College. Another 15 acres (6 ha) was assumed in 1975 for the MTT bus depot. The section "Laffer's Triangle" which they had purchased from the Laffer family, was leased to Flinders University, then sold to the South Australian Government and now includes the Sturt police station. By the turn of the 21st Century, only a few tiny patches of vines remained on Oaklands Road, maintained by the Marion Council, and in "Laffers Triangle", for twenty years overrun with wild olive trees, and subsequently involved as a construction site for the Darlington Upgrade Project.

The company purchased land for vineyards at Happy Valley, Springton, Eden Valley, Nildottie, and Wood Wood, near Swan Hill, and continues to make wines in South Australia, under Mark Hamilton, a member of the sixth-generation of South Australian Hamiltons.

Richard Burton Hamilton, Frank Hamilton’s grandson and a fifth generation of South Australian Hamilton’s began making wine in 1972 in McLaren Vale and continues to produce South Australian wine to this day under ‘Richard Hamilton Wines’ and ‘Leconfield Wines’ labels.

== See also ==
- Australian wine
- Cult wine
- South Australian food and drink
- List of wineries in the Barossa Valley

== Sources ==
- Bishop, Geoffrey C. The Vineyards of Adelaide Lynton Publications Pty. Ltd., Blackwood, SA. ISBN 0 86946 280 6
- http://hamiltonewell.com.au/pdfs/HamiltonDescendants.pdf
