= Magdala, South Australia =

Magdala South Australia
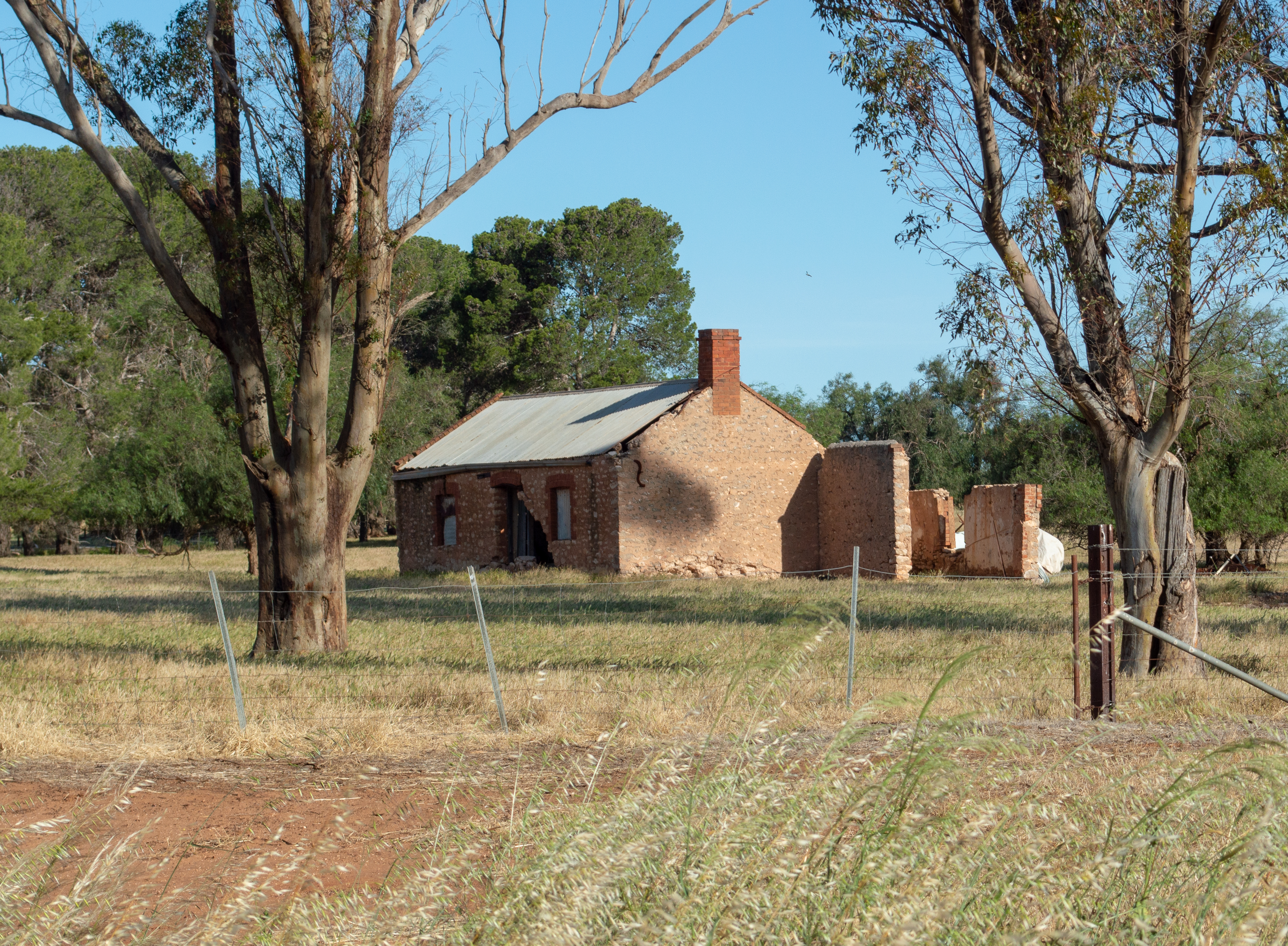
- Former homestead immediately south of the intersection of Roennfeldt and Owen roads

- Coordinates: 34.433310°S 138.708750°E
- Population: 79 (SAL 2021)
- Established: 1890s
- Postcode(s): 5400
- Location: 20 km (12 mi) N of Gawler
- LGA(s): Light Regional Council
- State electorate(s): Light
- Federal division(s): Grey
Localities around Magdala:
	Hamley Bridge	Linwood
Pinkerton Plains	Magdala	Morn Hill
	Wasleys	Templers

Magdala (sometimes erroneously spelled Magdalla) is a former settlement and current locality about 20 km north of Gawler in South Australia. There was formerly a church and Lutheran school, but all that remains is the cemetery. Magdala is on the road from Templers to Hamley Bridge. It was established in the 1890s and had a school from 1903 to 1940. The Roseworthy-Peterborough railway line passes through the settlement.
