= Freeling, South Australia =

Freeling
- Town
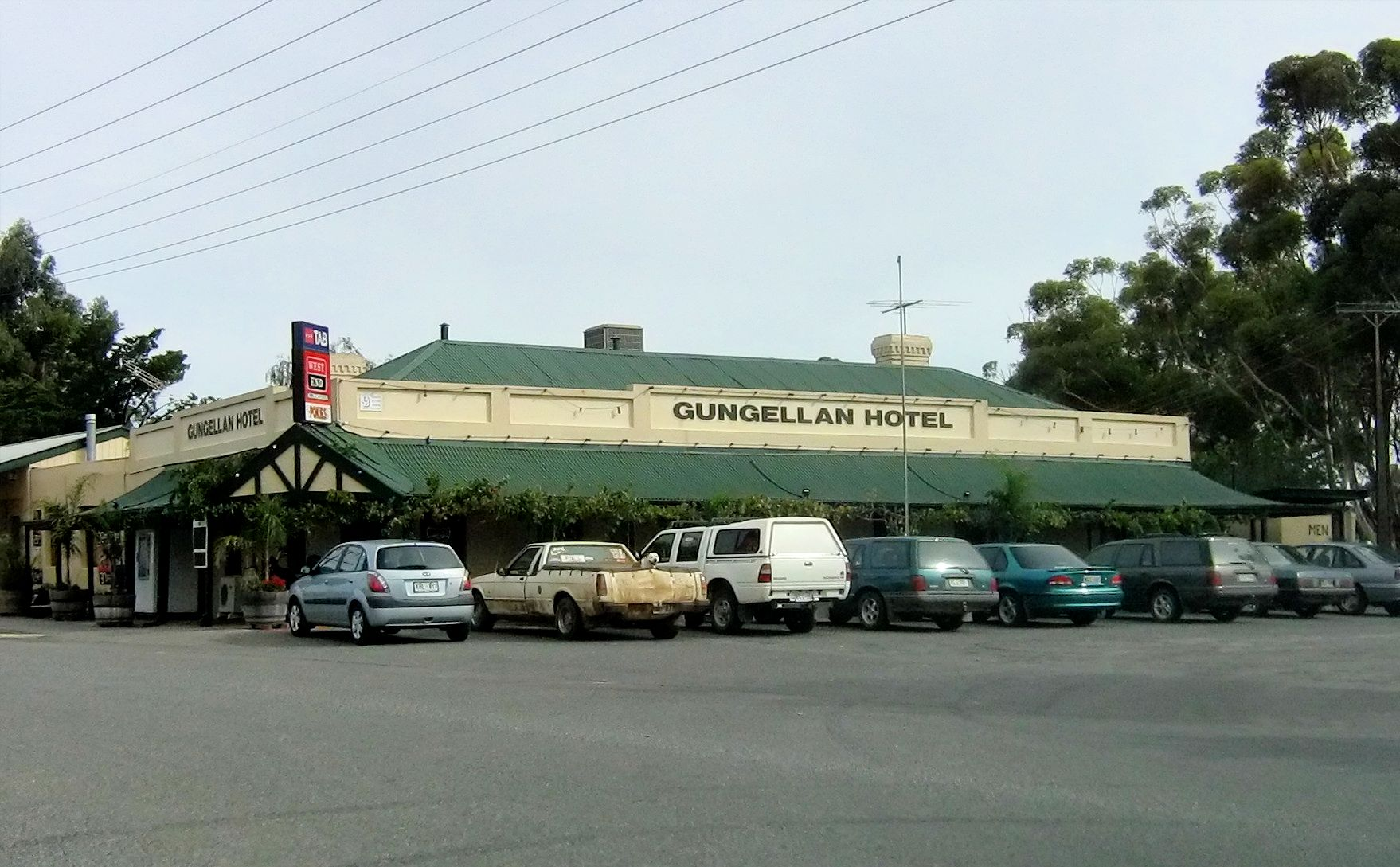
- The hotel in Freeling, used as a set in McLeod's Daughters

- Coordinates: 34°27′0″S 138°48′0″E
- Country: Australia
- State: South Australia
- LGA: Light Regional Council
- Location: 60 km (37 mi) from Adelaide, South Australia
- Established: 1860

Government
  - State electorate: Light
  - Federal division: Barker
- Elevation: 197 m (646 ft)

Population
  - Total: 2,214 (2016 census)
- Postcode: 5372
- Mean max temp: 48.6 °C (119.5 °F)
- Mean min temp: −3.4 °C (25.9 °F)
- Annual rainfall: 449 mm (17.7 in)
Localities around Freeling
Morn Hill	Linwood	Fords
Templers	Freeling	Nain
Roseworthy	Shea-Oak Log	Daveyston

Freeling is a small town in South Australia, about 60 km north of Adelaide. It neighbours the Barossa Valley wine region. At the 2021 census, Freeling had a population of 2,688.

== Description ==
Freeling is in the Light Regional Council, the state electoral district of Schubert and the federal Division of Barker.

== History ==
The township of Freeling was surveyed in March 1860 by Robert Stephenson. It was named after Major-General Sir Arthur Henry Freeling, Surveyor-General of South Australia from 1849 to 1861. Freeling was a stopping place on the Gawler to Kapunda railway, which opened in 1860 but is no longer used. The Freeling Hotel was founded in 1863, the Railway Hotel in 1867 and the St Petri Lutheran Church (now a private home) in 1871. By 1866, Freeling's population numbered approximately 60.

== Local economy ==
The main source of income for the town is its extensive farming land, where mainly cereal crops are grown. It is regarded as some of the best farming land in Australia, with the University of Adelaide's Roseworthy Campus, (Roseworthy, South Australia) situated nearby. The long-term rainfall average for Freeling is 475mm/Yr, this enables wheat crops of up to 5-6T/Ha to be grown as well as large tonnages of cereal hay, with thousands of acres of hay being harvested each year. A factory making farming implement blades and parts, has also been situated at Freeling for many years.

A major tourist attraction for the town and surrounding area is a popular Australian Drama television series, McLeod's Daughters. The town had many sets used on the show, including the Gungellan Hotel (previously the Railway Hotel), truckstop and showgrounds.

== Gallery ==
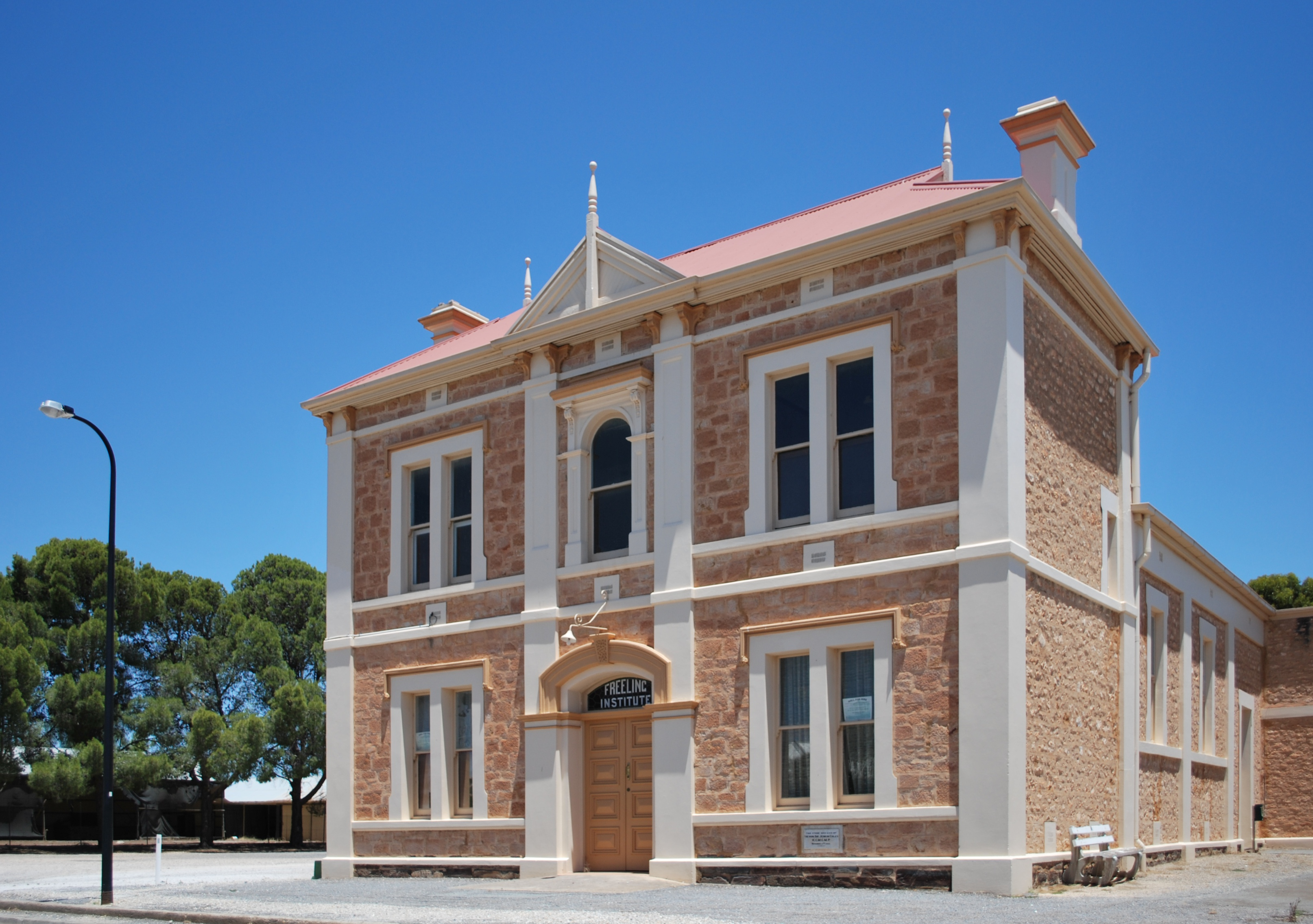
Institute

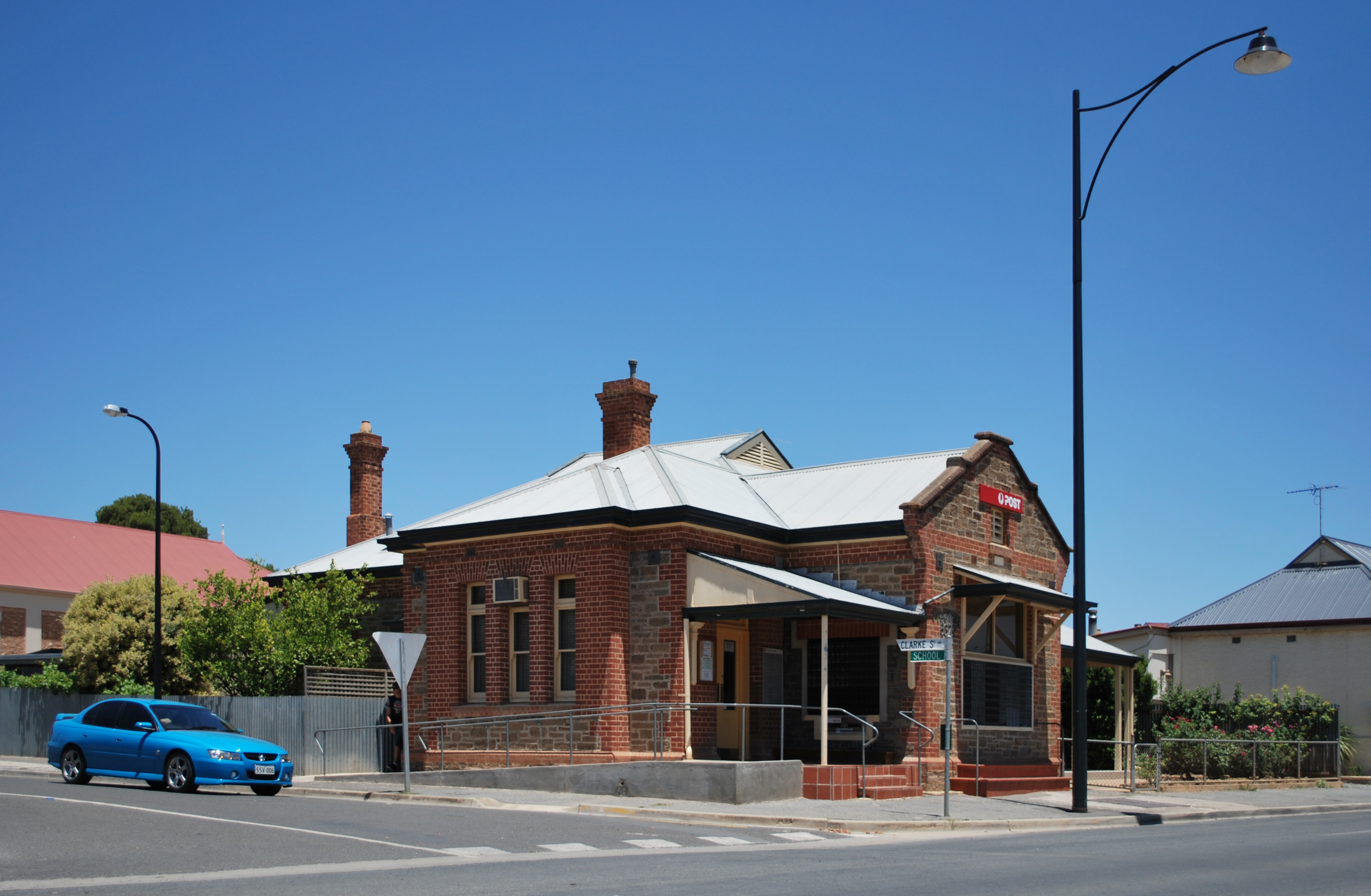
Post office

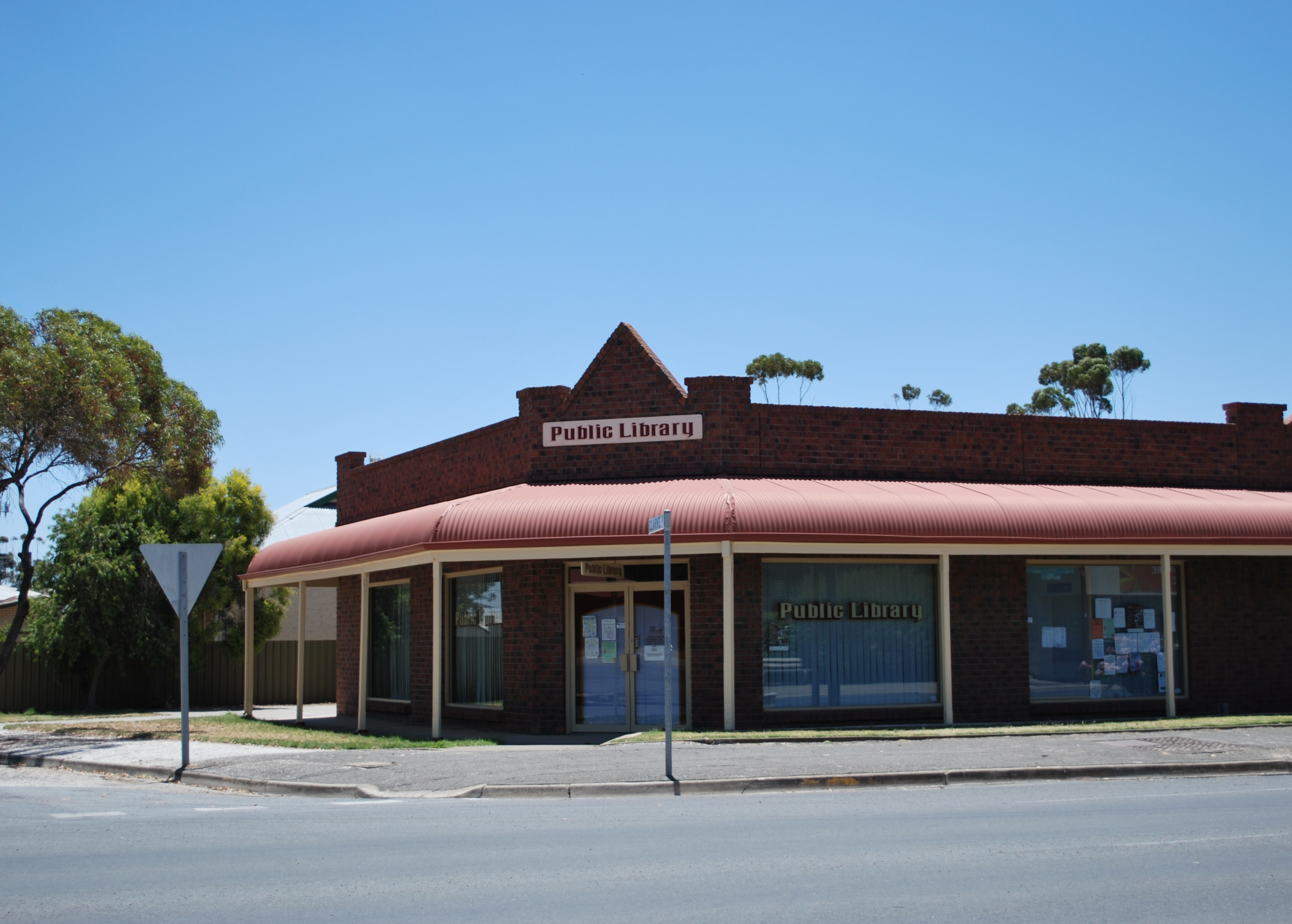
Public library

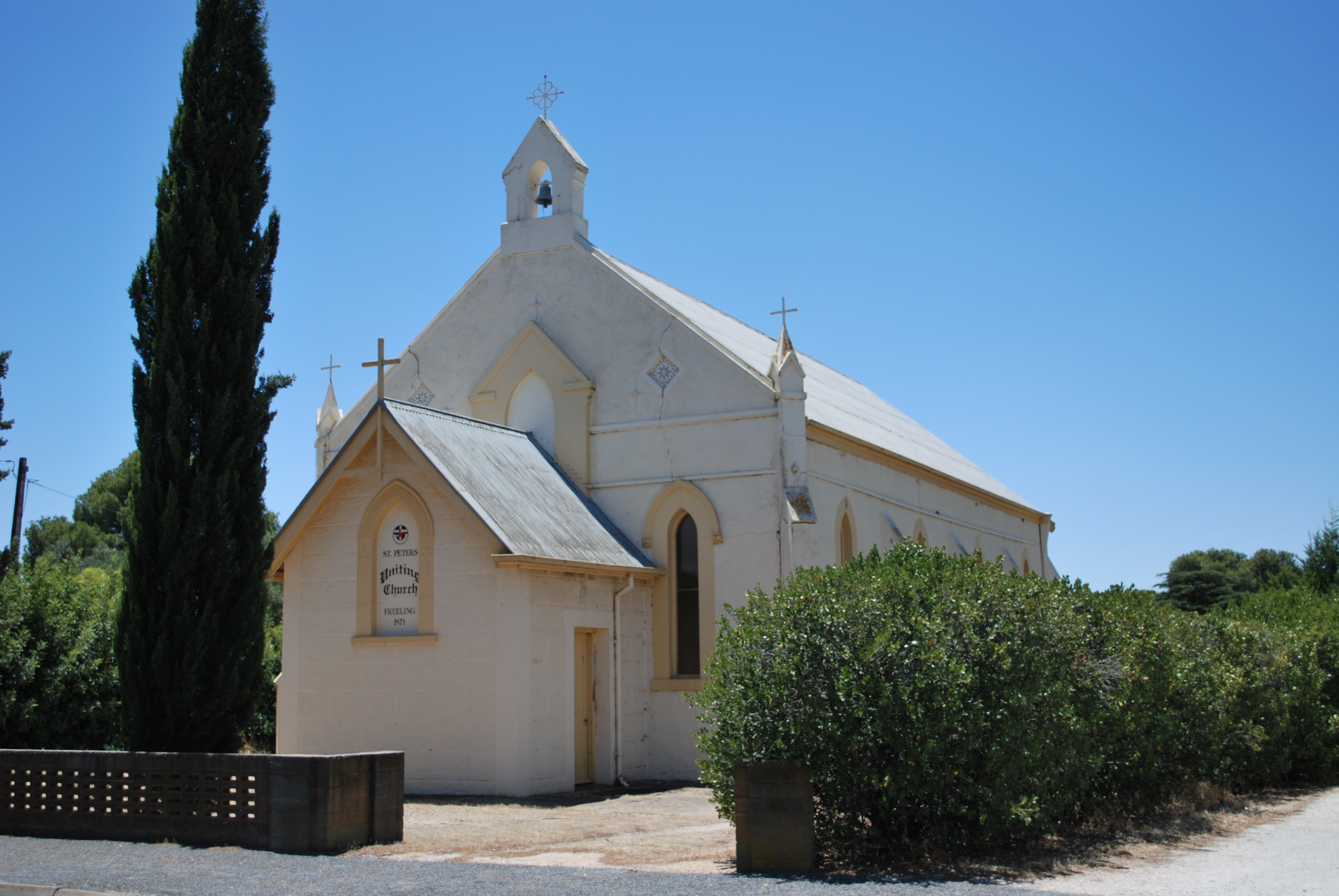
Uniting Church

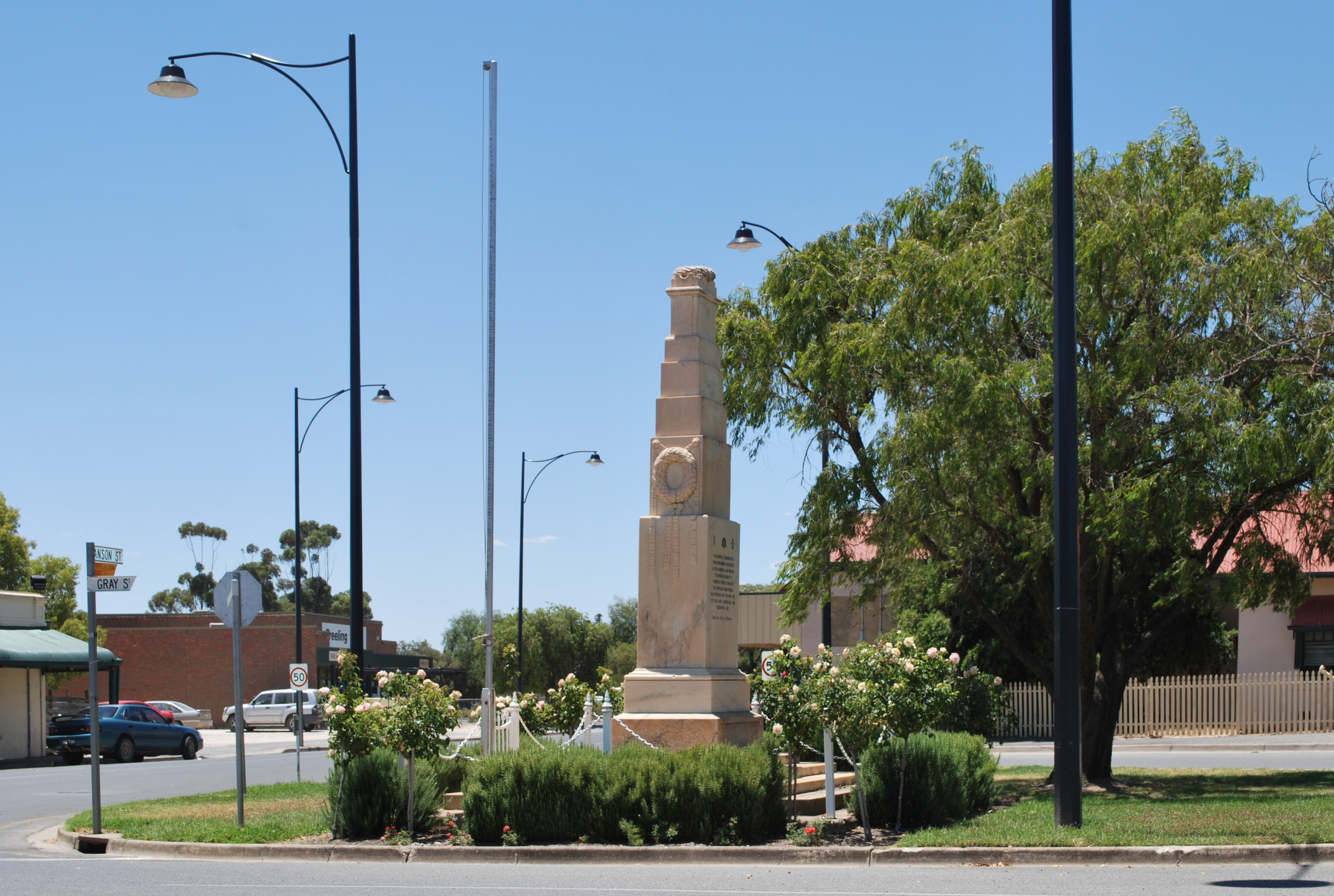
War Memorial
