= Morn Hill =

Morn Hill South Australia
- Coordinates: 34.417°S 138.759°E
- Population: 17 (2016 census)
- Location: 20 km (12 mi) north of Gawler
- LGA(s): Light Regional Council
- State electorate(s): Schubert
- Federal division(s): Barker; Grey
Localities around Morn Hill:
	Linwood
Magdala	Morn Hill	Freeling
	Templers

Morn Hill is a locality in the Mid North region of South Australia. It straddles the Horrocks Highway midway between Gawler and Tarlee.

Morn Hill is a rural locality with a handful of farms—at the 2016 census, there were six dwellings housing 17 people. The locality drew its name from the Morn Hill School which opened in 1891 but has long since closed. Morn Hill also had a Primitive Methodist church which had opened by 1870 and closed soon after 1900.

In the Morn Hill area, the Horrocks Highway (formerly Main North Road) forms the boundary between the federal electoral divisions of Grey (on the west) and Barker (to the east).
