= Stockyard Creek, South Australia =

Stockyard Creek South Australia
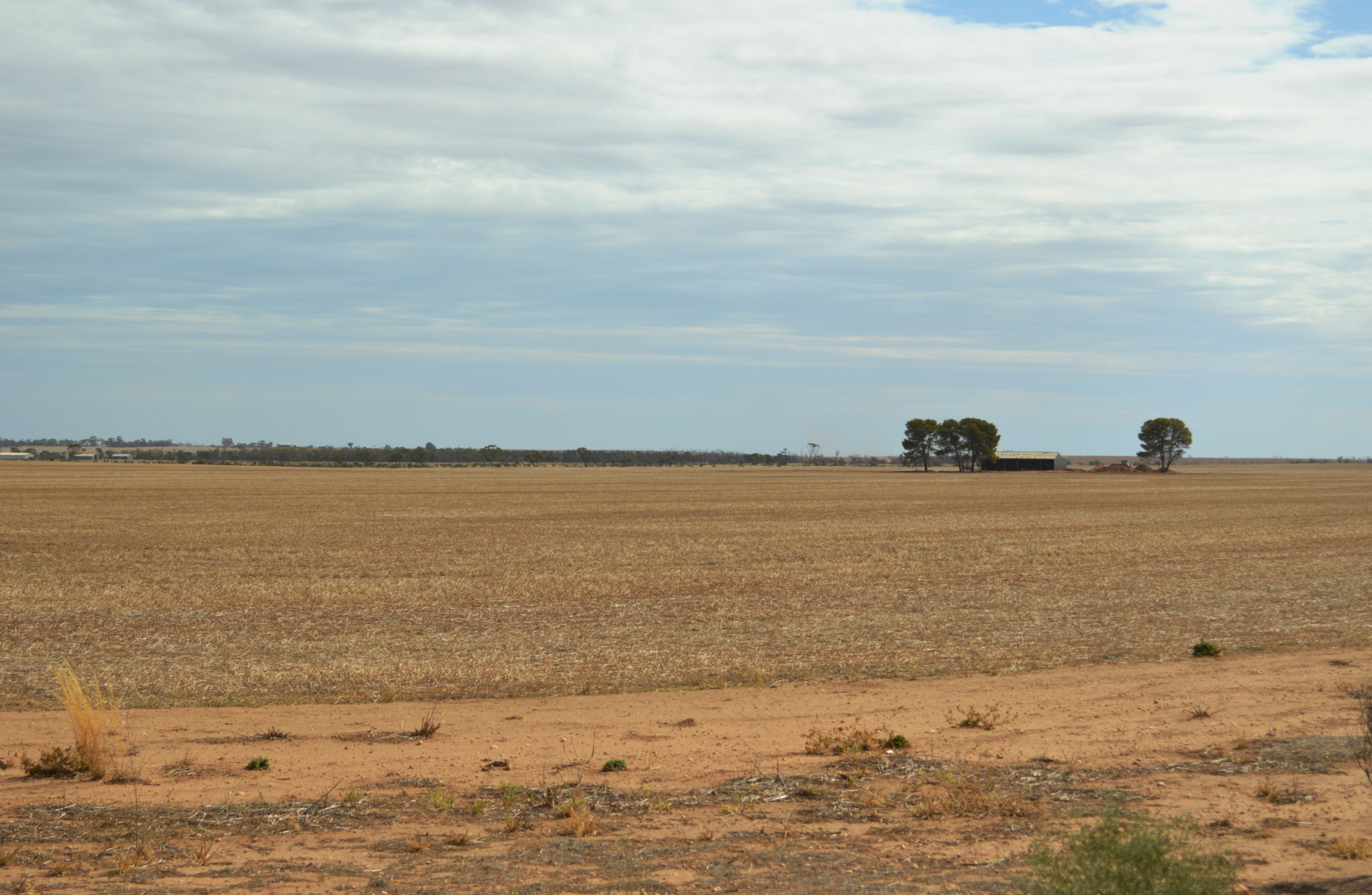
- Farmland at Stockyard Creek

- Coordinates: 34.299510°S 138.585060°E
- Population: 15 (SAL 2021)
- Postcode(s): 5460
- Elevation: 117 m (384 ft)
- Location: 12 km (7 mi) NW of Hamley Bridge; 6 km (4 mi) SE of Owen
- LGA(s): Wakefield Regional Council
- State electorate(s): Goyder
- Federal division(s): Grey
Suburbs around Stockyard Creek:
Owen		Alma
	Stockyard Creek
	Barabba	Hamley Bridge

Stockyard Creek is a locality between Hamley Bridge and Owen, South Australia in the Mid North region of South Australia. It was established on the Hamley Bridge to Balaklava railway at the site of stockyards used by CB Fisher, 51 3/4 miles (83.3 km) north of Adelaide railway station.

The private subdivision of Bartleville was laid out by Thomas Bartlett in 1881 to the north of the Stockyard Creek railway station. There was a post office and several railway cottages near the station, but very little remains now.
