= Roseworthy, South Australia =

Roseworthy
- Town
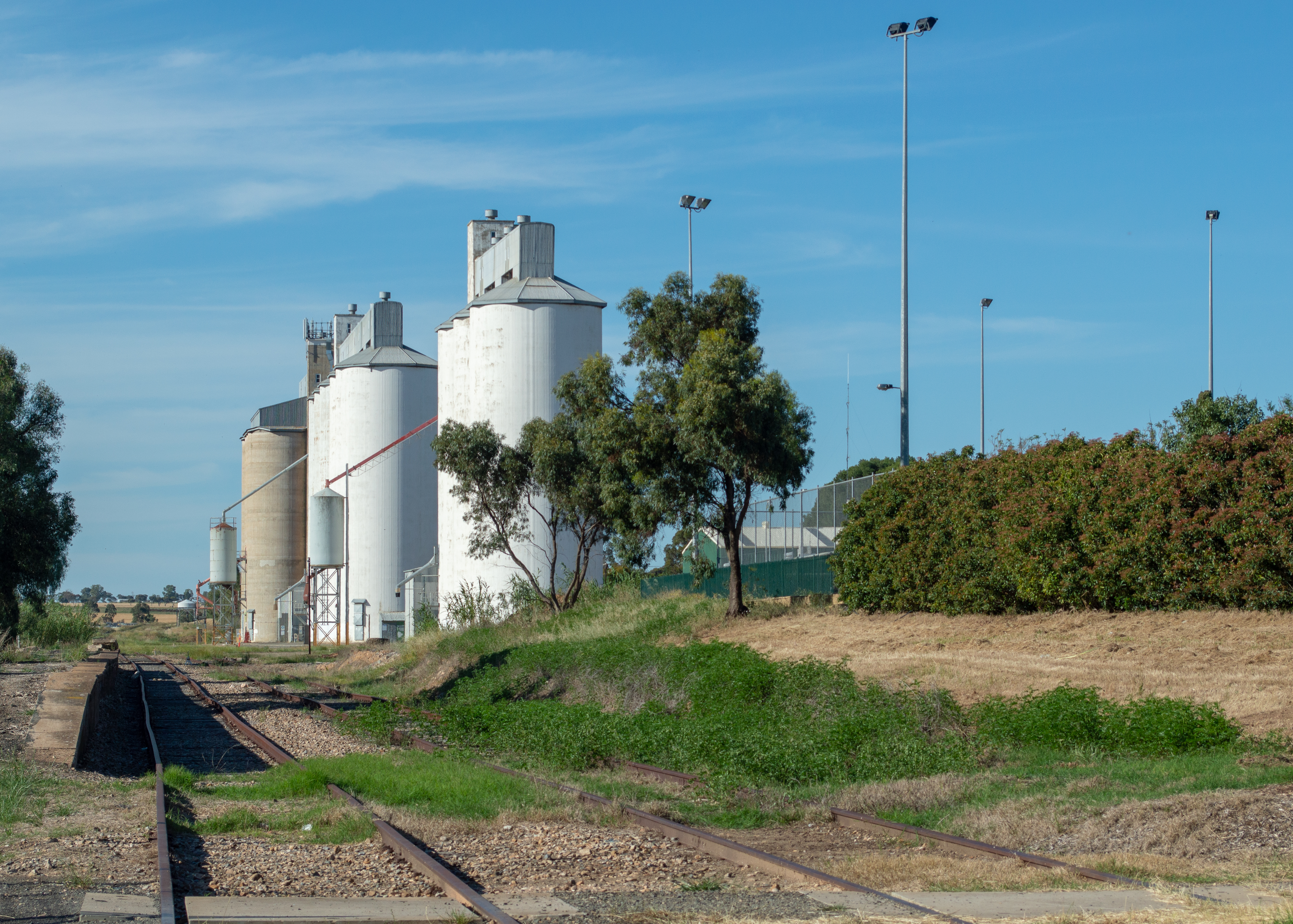
- Silos in Roseworthy

- Coordinates: 34.534°S 138.748°E
- Country: Australia
- State: South Australia
- LGA: Light Regional Council
- Location: 10 km (6.2 mi) N of Gawler
- Established: 1863

Government
  - State electorate: Schubert
  - Federal divisions: Barker; Grey
- Elevation: 65 m (213 ft)

Population
  - Total: 994 (2016 census)
- Postcode: 5371
- Mean max temp: 23.7 °C (74.7 °F)
- Mean min temp: 9.7 °C (49.5 °F)
- Annual rainfall: 381.5 mm (15.02 in)
Localities around Roseworthy
Wasleys	Templers	Freeling
Wasleys	Roseworthy	Shea-Oak Log
Kangaroo Flat	Gawler Belt	Kingsford

Roseworthy is a small town in South Australia, about 10 km north of Gawler on the Horrocks Highway. At the 2016 census, Roseworthy had a population of 994.

Roseworthy has a large grain storage facility consisting of both storage silos and bunkers for grain grown in the surrounding areas, and grain is now taken by road transport to Port Adelaide for export where it was once taken by rail.

The Roseworthy campus of the University of Adelaide is the location of Australia's newest Vet School. The School of Animal & Veterinary Sciences provides education and training of animal and veterinary scientists in a research environment. The School offers three academic programs: Animal Science, Veterinary Bioscience and Doctor of Veterinary Medicine (DVM).

Roseworthy is a popular stop for many truck drivers with the Roseworthy Roadhouse often bustling with resting travellers and transport drivers as they traverse along the Horrocks Highway.

Roseworthy is in the Light Regional Council, the state electoral district of Schubert and the federal divisions of Barker and Grey.

== History ==
The Surveyor General of South Australia visited the site which would become Roseworthy on 13 December 1837. In 1855, land in the Hundred of Mudla Wirra was purchased by William and Grace Gartrell. 12 years later, the now-widowed Mrs Gartrell subdivided the land for a township, naming it Roseworthy after the hamlet of Roseworthy, Cornwall, England, from whence she had originally come.

=== Climate ===
Roseworthy has a semi-arid influenced hot-summer mediterranean climate (Köppen: Csa/BSk) with warm to hot, dry summers and mild, slightly wet winters. On average, the town experiences 105.0 clear days and 122.3 cloudy days per annum. The wettest recorded day was 25 January 1941 with 112.5 mm (4.43 in) of rainfall. Extreme temperatures ranged from 48.3 °C (118.9 °F) on 24 January 2019 to −3.6 °C (25.5 °F) on 5 August 2020.

The original weather station recorded temperature, precipitation, solar exposure, 9 am and 3 pm conditions. It was closed in 1997.

Climate data for Roseworthy Agricultural College (34.53°S 138.69°E) (68 m (223 ft) AMSL) (1865-1997)
Month	Jan	Feb	Mar	Apr	May	Jun	Jul	Aug	Sep	Oct	Nov	Dec	Year
Record high °C (°F)	46.4 (115.5)	44.9 (112.8)	43.2 (109.8)	37.8 (100.0)	32.8 (91.0)	26.4 (79.5)	27.5 (81.5)	31.5 (88.7)	34.7 (94.5)	41.8 (107.2)	45.3 (113.5)	45.4 (113.7)	46.4 (115.5)
Mean daily maximum °C (°F)	29.8 (85.6)	29.7 (85.5)	27.3 (81.1)	22.9 (73.2)	18.8 (65.8)	15.8 (60.4)	14.9 (58.8)	16.1 (61.0)	18.7 (65.7)	22.0 (71.6)	25.4 (77.7)	27.8 (82.0)	22.4 (72.4)
Mean daily minimum °C (°F)	14.9 (58.8)	15.2 (59.4)	13.5 (56.3)	11.1 (52.0)	8.9 (48.0)	6.8 (44.2)	6.0 (42.8)	6.3 (43.3)	7.2 (45.0)	9.1 (48.4)	11.6 (52.9)	13.6 (56.5)	10.4 (50.6)
Record low °C (°F)	3.6 (38.5)	5.6 (42.1)	4.1 (39.4)	0.6 (33.1)	−0.4 (31.3)	−1.9 (28.6)	−2.2 (28.0)	−2.0 (28.4)	−1.1 (30.0)	−0.9 (30.4)	0.0 (32.0)	2.6 (36.7)	−2.2 (28.0)
Average precipitation mm (inches)	21.4 (0.84)	19.3 (0.76)	20.3 (0.80)	37.0 (1.46)	46.8 (1.84)	52.5 (2.07)	49.9 (1.96)	52.8 (2.08)	46.8 (1.84)	43.0 (1.69)	27.7 (1.09)	22.7 (0.89)	440.3 (17.33)
Average precipitation days (≥ 0.2 mm)	4.0	3.6	4.8	8.5	11.5	13.4	14.8	14.6	11.9	10.0	6.5	5.2	108.8
Average afternoon relative humidity (%)	35	37	40	48	58	66	66	61	56	48	40	38	49
Average dew point °C (°F)	9.8 (49.6)	10.0 (50.0)	10.0 (50.0)	8.1 (46.6)	8.2 (46.8)	7.2 (45.0)	6.8 (44.2)	6.5 (43.7)	7.2 (45.0)	7.7 (45.9)	6.7 (44.1)	8.4 (47.1)	8.1 (46.5)
Mean monthly sunshine hours	331.7	285.3	263.5	204.0	167.4	159.0	167.4	189.1	192.0	242.8	282.0	310.0	2,794.2
Percentage possible sunshine	76	76	69	61	52	54	54	56	54	60	68	69	62
Source: Bureau of Meteorology (1883-1997)

A newer weather station was opened in 1997. It records temperature, precipitation and 3 pm conditions.

Climate data for Roseworthy AWS (34.51°S 138.68°E) (65 m (213 ft) AMSL) (1997-2025)
Month	Jan	Feb	Mar	Apr	May	Jun	Jul	Aug	Sep	Oct	Nov	Dec	Year
Record high °C (°F)	48.3 (118.9)	46.6 (115.9)	43.4 (110.1)	38.9 (102.0)	31.9 (89.4)	27.1 (80.8)	24.7 (76.5)	30.2 (86.4)	34.4 (93.9)	39.3 (102.7)	44.9 (112.8)	47.6 (117.7)	48.3 (118.9)
Mean daily maximum °C (°F)	31.8 (89.2)	31.1 (88.0)	28.2 (82.8)	24.1 (75.4)	19.8 (67.6)	16.2 (61.2)	15.5 (59.9)	16.6 (61.9)	20.0 (68.0)	23.8 (74.8)	27.3 (81.1)	29.7 (85.5)	23.7 (74.6)
Mean daily minimum °C (°F)	15.0 (59.0)	14.7 (58.5)	12.8 (55.0)	10.5 (50.9)	8.4 (47.1)	6.6 (43.9)	5.7 (42.3)	5.4 (41.7)	6.3 (43.3)	8.0 (46.4)	10.7 (51.3)	12.7 (54.9)	9.7 (49.5)
Record low °C (°F)	4.3 (39.7)	4.0 (39.2)	3.3 (37.9)	1.0 (33.8)	−1.5 (29.3)	−3.1 (26.4)	−2.6 (27.3)	−3.6 (25.5)	−2.4 (27.7)	−1.3 (29.7)	0.3 (32.5)	3.5 (38.3)	−3.6 (25.5)
Average precipitation mm (inches)	17.8 (0.70)	17.2 (0.68)	15.1 (0.59)	28.2 (1.11)	38.4 (1.51)	46.1 (1.81)	43.2 (1.70)	44.7 (1.76)	42.5 (1.67)	34.4 (1.35)	29.7 (1.17)	23.5 (0.93)	381.5 (15.02)
Average precipitation days (≥ 0.2 mm)	4.1	3.2	4.1	7.5	11.3	14.1	15.9	15.8	13.1	9.6	7.9	6.3	112.9
Average afternoon relative humidity (%)	28	31	33	38	50	60	62	57	54	42	33	31	43
Average dew point °C (°F)	6.7 (44.1)	7.9 (46.2)	6.7 (44.1)	5.8 (42.4)	6.7 (44.1)	6.8 (44.2)	6.7 (44.1)	6.3 (43.3)	7.4 (45.3)	5.5 (41.9)	5.4 (41.7)	6.0 (42.8)	6.5 (43.7)
Source: Bureau of Meteorology (1997-2025)
