= Shea-Oak Log, South Australia =

Shea-Oak Log South Australia
- Coordinates: 34.5144°S 138.8164°E
- Population: 175 (2011 census)
- Location: 56 km (35 mi) N of Adelaide; 15 km (9 mi) NE of Gawler; 15 km (9 mi) W of Tanunda
- LGA(s): Light Regional Council
- State electorate(s): Schubert
- Federal division(s): Barker
Localities around Shea-Oak Log:
| Freeling | Freeling | Daveyston |
| Roseworthy | Shea-Oak Log | Seppeltsfield |
| Kingsford | Rosedale | Gomersal |

Shea-Oak Log is a settlement in South Australia adjacent to the Sturt Highway. At the 2011 census, Shea-Oak Log had a population of 175. Major industries in the area are manufacturing/engineering, grain and pig farming.
