= Stockport, South Australia =

Stockport
- Town
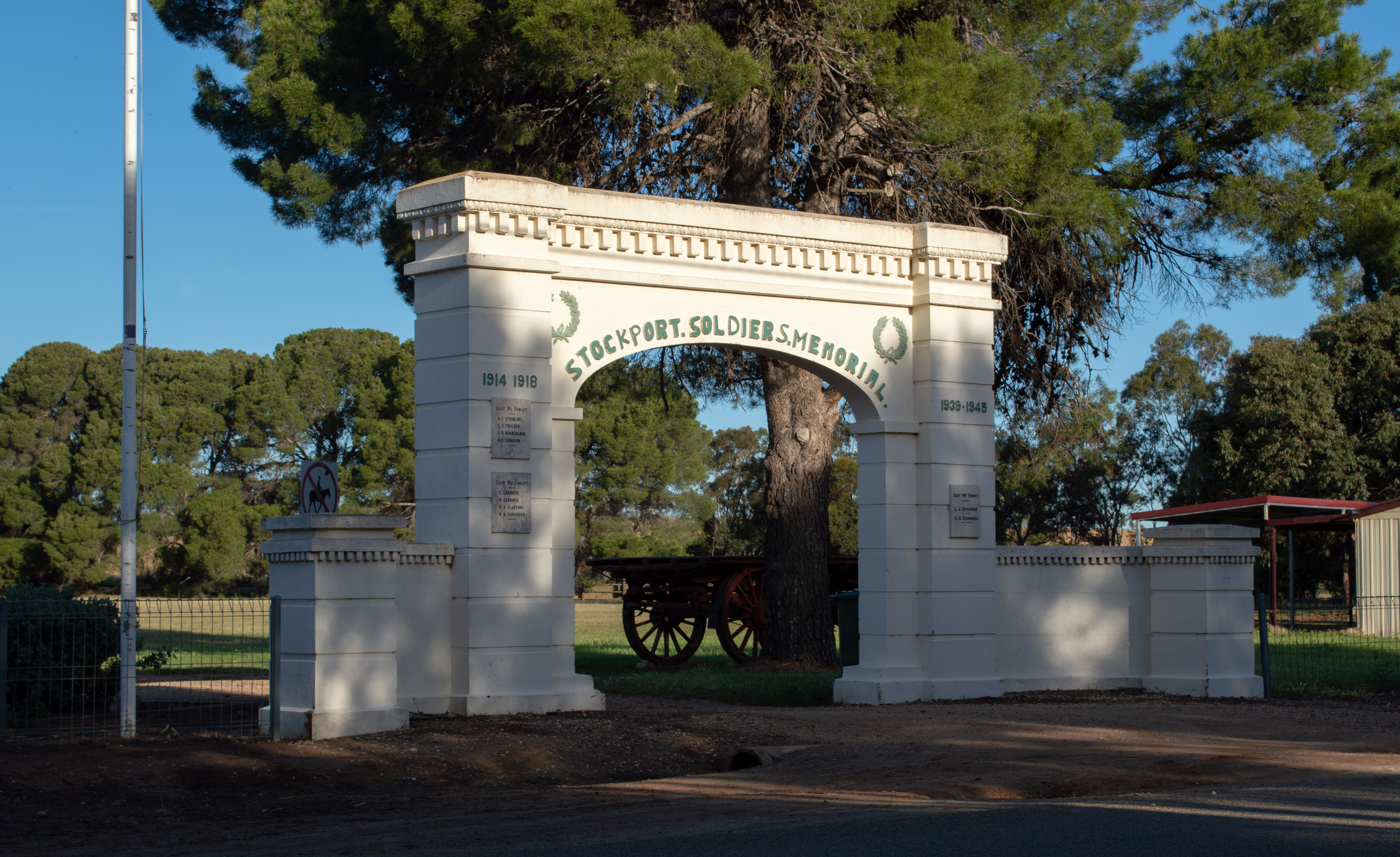
- Stockport War Memorial

- Coordinates: 34°20′0″S 138°44′0″E
- Country: Australia
- State: South Australia
- LGA: District Council of Clare and Gilbert Valleys
- Location: 73 km (45 mi) N of Adelaide; 21 km (13 mi) W of Kapunda; 9 km (5.6 mi) S of Tarlee
- Established: 1845

Government
  - State electorate: Frome
  - Federal division: Grey

Population
  - Total: 272 (SAL 2021)
- Postcode: 5410
Localities around Stockport
Alma	Giles Corner	Tarlee
Stockyard Creek	Stockport	Bethel
Hamley Bridge	Linwood	Fords

Stockport is a small town 73 kilometres (45 mi) north of Adelaide and 9.3 kilometres (5.8 mi) south of Tarlee in South Australia. It was laid out on section 1283, Hundred of Light in 1845 by Samuel Stocks junior, naming it for his birthplace, Stockport in Cheshire (now Greater Manchester), England.

On the southern boundary of the Clare & Gilbert Valleys Council area, it was once the heart of a small farming community. Stockport was a stop on the Peterborough railway line which opened past Stockport in 1869, connecting it to Adelaide. The line closed in the 2000s.

Stockport today boasts a number of old stone homes, mixed with a number of new residences. At the 2006 census, Stockport had a population of 234.

The Charles Todd Observatory, topped by a 7.5 metre dome, was built at Stockport c. 1970. It is operated by the Astronomical Society of South Australia. It was closed in 2010 after being damaged in a severe storm, but reopened in 2016.

Glenhaven Park Camp, an adventure park operated by the YMCA, is located off Ayliffe Bridge Road at Stockport (34.360°S 138.737°E).

The Roseworthy-Peterborough railway line runs through Stockport.

== See also ==
- List of cities and towns in South Australia
