= Kudla, South Australia =

Kudla
- Suburb
- Coordinates: 34°39′S 138°42′E
- Country: Australia
- State: South Australia
- City: Gawler
- LGA: Town of Gawler
- Location: 34 km (21 mi) from Adelaide

Government
  - State electorate: Light
  - Federal division: Spence

Population
  - Total: 551 (SAL 2021)
- Postcode: 5115
Suburbs around Kudla
Hillier	Evanston Gardens	Evanston Park
	Kudla	Evanston South
Munno Para Downs		Blakeview

Kudla is a locality in the northern Adelaide suburbs, 34 km from the city centre, just south of Gawler. It is in the Town of Gawler local government area.

== Geography ==
Kudla is bounded by Main North Road, Dalkeith Road, Angle Vale Road and Gordon Road. Coventry Road is the most significant road through the area, approximately southwest to northeast. Kudla is named after the Kudla railway station, which in turn had been named from an Aboriginal word meaning level ground, open or remote. The name was approved in 1982 in preference to alternate possibilities of Dalkeith and Dalkeith Vale. Kudla is served by the Dalkeith Country Fire Service based on the south side of the Dalkeith Road and Coventry Road intersection.

== Transport ==
Kudla is served by the Kudla railway station on the Gawler railway line and is west of Main North Road.
