= Kudla railway station =

Railway station in Adelaide, South Australia

Kudla
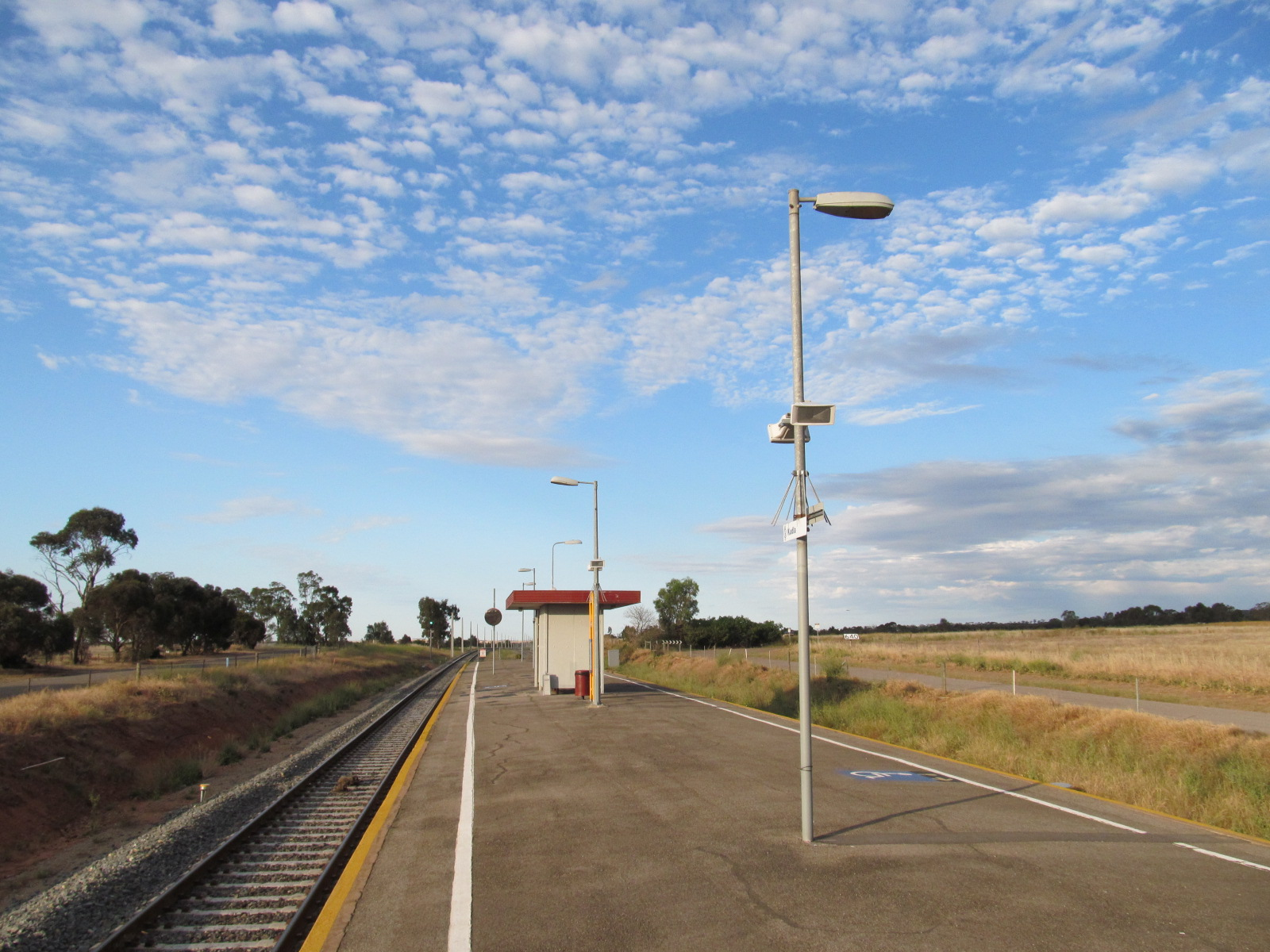
- Northbound view from Platform 1, November 2012

General information
- Location: Macalister Road, Kudla
- Coordinates: 34°39′06″S 138°42′23″E
- Owner: Department for Infrastructure & Transport
- Operator: Adelaide Metro
- Line: Gawler
- Distance: 34.1 km from Adelaide
- Platforms: 2
- Tracks: 2
- Connections: None

Construction
- Structure type: Ground
- Parking: No
- Cycle facilities: No
- Accessible: Yes

Other information
- Station code: 16532 (to City); 18556 (to Gawler Central)
- Website: Adelaide Metro

History
- Opened: 1959

Services
Preceding station	Adelaide Metro	Following station
Munno Para towards Adelaide	Gawler line	Tambelin towards Gawler Central
Location

Kudla railway station is located on the Gawler line in the northern Adelaide locality of Kudla.

== History ==
The station opened in 1959, and was named from an Aboriginal word meaning level ground, open or remote.

The current platform was constructed in 1961; by around 1987, the current platform shelter had been installed. It is one of the least used on the entire network, due to it being located in a semi-rural area between the suburban areas of Munno Para, Evanston, and Gawler.

== Platforms and Services ==
Kudla has an island platform and is serviced by Adelaide Metro. Trains are scheduled every 30 minutes, seven days a week.

Platform	Destination
1	Gawler and Gawler Central
2	Adelaide
