= Frederick May =

Frederick May may refer to:

- Frederick May (academic) (1921–1976), Australian professor of Italian
- Frederick May (composer) (1911–1985), Irish composer and arranger
- Frederick May (engineer) (1840–1897), Australian engineer and manufacturer
