= Evanston station =

Evanston station could refer to the following:

- Evanston railway station, a railway station in Adelaide, South Australia, Australia
- Three current commuter rail stations in Evanston, Illinois, United States:
  - Central Street/Evanston station
  - Davis Street/Evanston station
  - Main Street/Evanston station
- Evanston station (Wyoming), a former railway station in Evanston, Wyoming, United States
