= Evanston South =

- Suburb
- Coordinates: 34.645°S 138.727°E
- Country: Australia
- State: South Australia
- City: Adelaide
- LGA: Town of Gawler

Government
  - State electorate: Light
  - Federal division: Spence

Population
  - Total: 765 (SAL 2021)
- Postcode: 5116
Suburbs around Evanston South
Evanston Gardens	Evanston	Evanston Park
Kudla	Evanston South	Bibaringa
Munno Para Downs	Blakeview	Uleybury

Evanston South is a northern suburb of Adelaide, South Australia in the Town of Gawler. It is on the eastern side of Main North Road on the southern side of Gawler.

The southern part of Evanston South includes the Gawler Gate Tourist Park, formerly known as Dalkeith Caravan Park, at 3134 Main North Road.

The northern part of Evanston South contains Trinity College, Gawler, a residential housing estate developed in the 2010s, and vacant land zoned for future residential development.

== Cemeteries ==
The southern part of Evanston South includes the Smithfield Memorial Park cemetery, operated by the Adelaide Cemeteries Authority.

In 2021, a new 2 ha (4.9-acre) burial site was built in the cemetery to accommodate the repatriated remains of Kaurna people, on land donated by Adelaide Cemeteries, in collaboration with the South Australian Museum, and the South Australian Government, called Wangayarta. It was designed by a group that included elders Uncle Jeffrey Newchurch, Aunty Heather Agius, Uncle Major Moogy Sumner, and many others, and was supported by the Kaurna Yerta Aboriginal Corporation.

In November 2021, the South Australian Museum apologised to the Kaurna people for having held 4,600 Aboriginal remains over the past 165 years, and buried the first 100 remains of their ancestors at the site. The memorial site is in the shape of the Kaurna shield, to protect the ancestors now buried there. A second round of burials took place in June 2022.
