= Max Fatchen =

Australian author and journalist

Max Fatchen AM
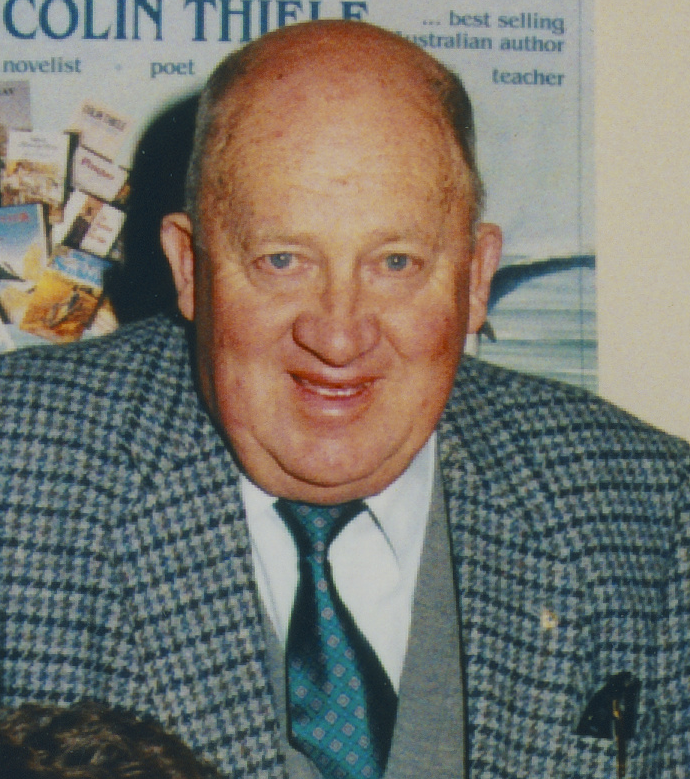
- Born: 3 August 1920; Adelaide, South Australia, Australia
- Died: 14 October 2012 (aged 92); Gawler East, South Australia, Australia
- Occupation: Author
- Spouse: Jean Wohlers (m. 1942)
- Writing career
- Notable awards: Walkley Award (1996)

Maxwell Edgar Fatchen, AM (3 August 1920 – 14 October 2012) was an Australian children's writer and journalist.

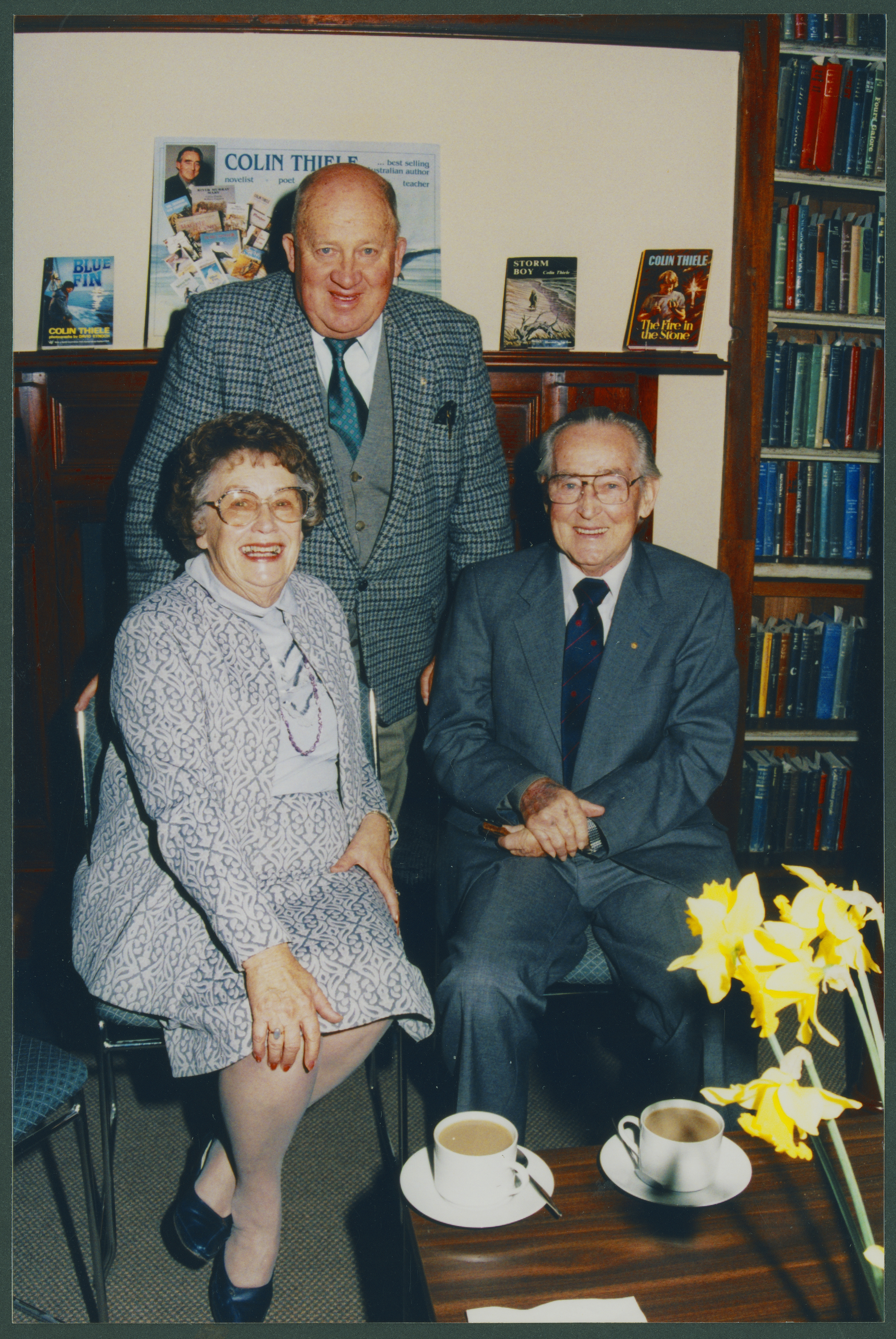
Colin Thiele and Rhonnie Thiele with Max Fatchen standing behind at the State Library's 'Colin Thiele Day' in the Mortlock Library on 14 September 2000

== Early life ==
Fatchen was born at "Narma" private hospital, South Terrace, Adelaide, the only son of Cecil William Fatchen and Isabel Harriet Fatchen, née Ridgway, of "Garowen", Angle Vale.

He spent his childhood on an Adelaide Plains farm at Angle Vale. He learned to drive a team of Clydesdale horses and did part of his secondary school studies at home, driving his horse and buggy once a week to Gawler High School to have his papers corrected.

== Career ==
He entered journalism as a copy boy, and after five years in the Australian Army and Royal Australian Air Force during World War II, he became a journalist with The News and later The Advertiser. He covered many major stories in Australia and overseas.

Four decades of writing for children, especially those of primary school age, began in 1966 with The River Kings. His children's poems, such as "Just fancy that", remain popular. He wrote 20 books; his novels appear in seven countries, and his poetry appears throughout the English-speaking world.

The River Kings and Conquest of the River were the basis for a TV mini-series, The River Kings, in 1991.

== Adult life ==
Max resided at Jane Street, Smithfield from 1952 (now called Max Fatchen Mews) for most of his adult life. He died on 14 October 2012 in his sleep at Gawler Health Service, Gawler East, South Australia.

== Honours and legacy ==
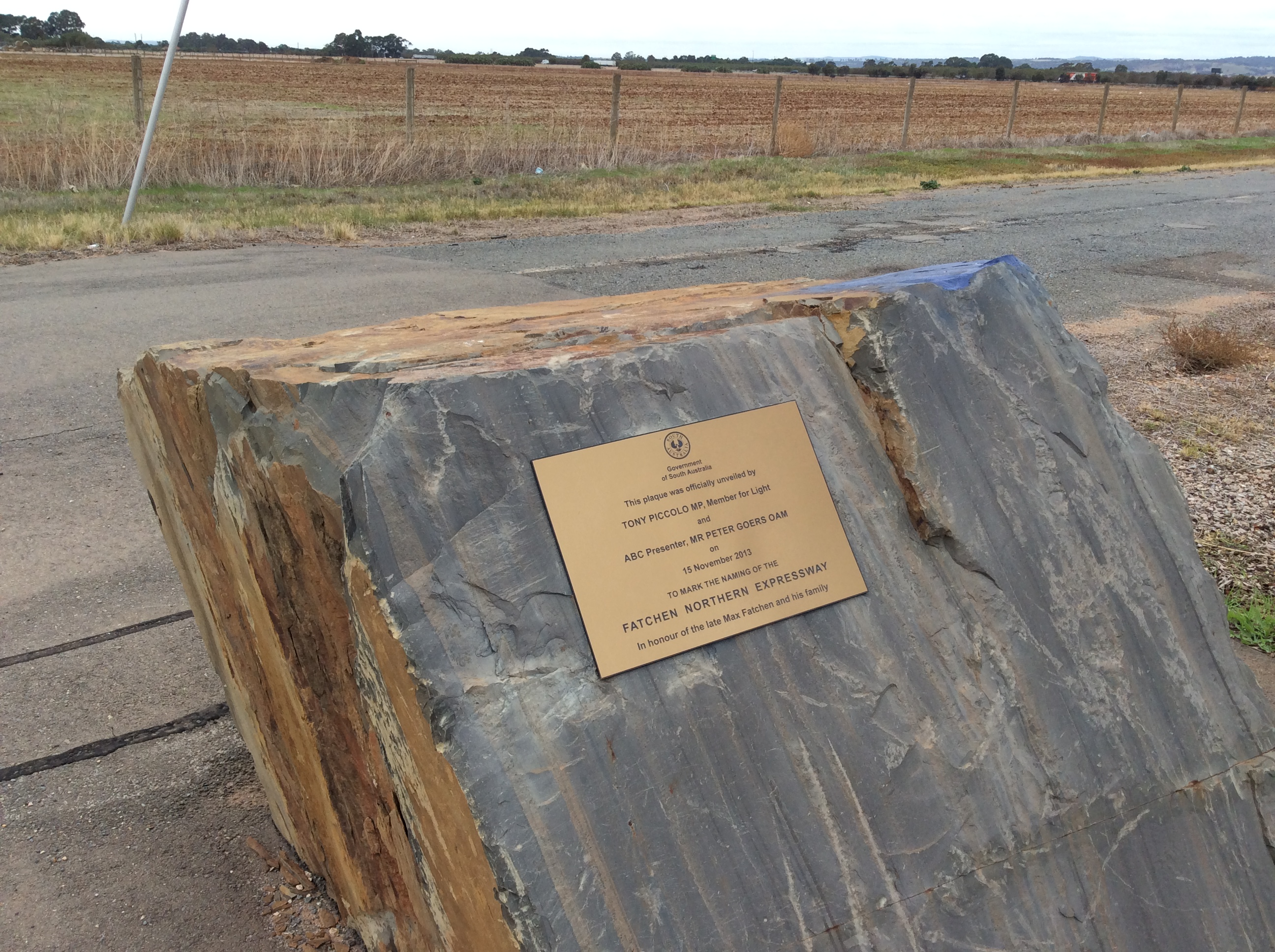
Plaque on the Fatchen memorial at Angle Vale, South Australia

- Three of his books received commendations in the Children's Book of the Year Award.
- Member of the Order of Australia in 1980.
- Advance Australia Award for literature in 1991.
- Walkley Award for journalism in 1996.
- Primary English Teaching Associations Award for children's poetry in 1996.
- "SA Great" Award for Literature in 1999.
- Centenary of Federation Medal in 2003 for service to the community in journalism, poetry, and writing for children.
- Inaugural Life Member of the SA Writers Centre in 2004 for long years of support, encouragement, and ambassadorship for the Centre.
- Max Fatchen Drive in Angle Vale and the Max Fatchen Expressway ( also known as the Northern Expressway ) are named after him.
- The Max Fatchen Fellowship was named to celebrate his achievements and commitment to children's literature and the local writing community. It is open to South Australian writers for young people.

== Bibliography ==
By Max Fatchen

- The River Kings (1966) novel set on River Murray paddle steamer in early 20th century ISBN 9781862546639
- Flodens Konger (1966) The River Kings translated into Danish ISBN 8700256617
- Conquest of the River, illustrated by Clyde Pearson, published Methuen & Co. (1970) ISBN 0416144802

Note: This and The River Kings above were the basis of the 1991 television series The River Kings

- The Spirit Wind, illustrated by Trevor Stubley, published Methuen (1973) novel set in outback South Australia ISBN 0416769403 Also available in braille edition
- Time Wave, illustrated by Edward Mortelmans (1978) novel for children ISBN 0416584209
- Songs for My Dog and Other People, illustrated by Michael Atchison Penguin Books (1980) ISBN 0722656459
- Closer to the Stars; publisher Methuen (1981), republished Puffin Books (1983) novel set in wartime 1941 ISBN 0140316248
- Wry Rhymes for Troublesome Times (1983) 2nd ed. Puffin Books (1985) ISBN 0140315187
- Chase through the night; illustrated by Graham Humphreys, publisher Methuen (1983) novel set in outback Queensland ISBN 0416872204
- Forever Fatchen, Advertiser Newspapers Ltd. (1983) ISBN 0959257217
- A Paddock of Poems Penguin Books Australia (1987) ISBN 0140324763
- Had Yer Jabs? Methuen Australia (1987) collection of short stories for children ISBN 0454012535
- A Pocketful of Rhymes, Penguin Books Australia (1989) ISBN 0140341390
- A Country Christmas illustrated by Timothy Ide (1990) ISBN 1862910383
- The Country Mail is Coming (1990) poems reminiscing about growing up in country South Australia ISBN 0316274933
- Peculiar Rhymes and Lunatic Lines ed. Naia Bray-Moffatt, illustrated by Lesley Bisseker, publisher Orchard Books (1995) ISBN 1852138858
- Mostly Max, illustrated by Michael Atchison, Wakefield Press (1995) selected from 50 years of Fatchen's columns in The Advertiser ISBN 1862543569
- Australia at the Beach illustrated Tom Jellett (1999)
- Songs for My Dog and Other Wry Rhymes illustrated by Michael Atchison, Wakefield Press (1999) ISBN 9781862544789

Note: This may be a revised edition of Songs for My Dog and Other People (1980) above

- The Very Long Nose of Jonathan Jones, illustrated by Craig Smith, ABC Books (2000) humorous story told in verse ISBN 0733309399
- Terrible Troy, illustrated by Stephen Axelsen, ABC Books (2000) humorous stories told in verse ISBN 0733307744
- Poetry All Sorts: The Max Fatchen Reciter, illustrated by Christina Booth, Triple-D Books (2003) ISBN 0957868170
- Meet the Monsters, illustrated by Cheryll Johns, Omnibus Books (2004) rhyming picture book ISBN 1862915288

As co-author or contributor

- Soundings: Poetry and Poetics proceedings of the Third Biennial National Conference on Poetry, Adelaide, 7–9 November 1997 / edited by Lyn Jacobs and Jeri Kroll, publisher Wakefield Press (1998) ISBN 1862544727
- Tea for Three with Colin Thiele, illustrated by Craig Smith, published Harcourt Education (1993) ISBN 1863912436
- Are You in There? with Rosaleen Stewart, illustrated by Mitch Vane (2004) ISBN 0123604281
- Tadpoles in the Torrens: Poems for Young Readers (2013) ed. Jude Aquilina; poems by Christobel Mattingley, Janeen Brian, Max Fatchen, Peter Combe, and Sean Williams ISBN 9781743052464

Biography

Andrew Male Other Times Wakefield Press, Adelaide (1997) includes selections from Max's writings, many not previously republished ISBN 9781862543836
