= Bibaringa =

- Suburb
- Coordinates: 34.638°S 138.77°E
- Country: Australia
- State: South Australia
- City: Adelaide
- LGA: City of Playford
- Location: 4 km (2.5 mi) southeast of Gawler
- Established: 1966

Government
  - State electorate: Schubert
  - Federal division: Spence

Population
  - Total: 246 (SAL 2021)
- Postcode: 5118
Suburbs around Bibaringa
Evanston Park	Gawler South	Kalbeeba
Evanston South	Bibaringa	Yattalunga
Uleybury	Uleybury	Yattalunga

Bibaringa is a northern suburb of Adelaide, South Australia in the City of Playford. It straddles the Gawler–One Tree Hill Road which follows the ridge up from Gawler between the South Para River gorge on the east of Bibaringa and the Adelaide Plains on the west.
