= Evanston Park =

- Suburb
- Coordinates: 34.62893°S 138.74885°E
- Country: Australia
- State: South Australia
- City: Adelaide
- LGA: Town of Gawler

Government
  - State electorate: Light
  - Federal division: Spence

Population
  - Total: 4,228 (SAL 2021)
- Postcode: 5116
Suburbs around Evanston Park
Evanston	Gawler South
Evanston Gardens	Evanston Park	Bibaringa
	Evanston South

Evanston Park is a northern suburb of Adelaide, South Australia. It is on the southeastern side of Gawler. It is on the eastern side of Main North Road and Adelaide Road extending north from near the intersection with Gawler Bypass Road.

== Governance ==
The majority of Evanston Park is in the Town of Gawler, straddling the boundary so that the eastern portion of the suburb is in the City of Playford. For the 2014 state election, the western part of Evanston Park was in the state electoral district of Light and the area east of Bentley Road was in the electoral district of Napier. For the 2018 election, the entire suburb was in Light.
