= Gawler East, South Australia =

Gawler East
- Suburb
- Coordinates: 34.60192°S 138.76469°E
- Country: Australia
- State: South Australia
- City: Adelaide
- LGA: Town of Gawler

Government
  - State electorate: Light
  - Federal division: Spence

Population
  - Total: 5,689 (SAL 2021)
- Postcode: 5118
Suburbs around Gawler East
Willaston		Concordia
Gawler	Gawler East	Kalbeeba
Gawler South

Gawler East is a town north of Adelaide, South Australia in the Town of Gawler. It is on the rising ground of the Adelaide Hills east of the town of Gawler. Some parts of the suburb date from as early as the settlement of Gawler. Other parts including newer housing estates up to still being developed in the 2010s.

Gawler East has private and public primary schools. It is also the site of the Gawler Hospital and an aged care facility.

Gawler East is bounded on the northern side by the Barossa Valley railway line and traversed by the Barossa Valley Way (known locally as Lyndoch Road) and Calton Road both providing access from the higher land down to the town of Gawler. There is also proposed to be a new road built from Gawler East to Evanston Park, bypassing the Gawler town centre and providing a new bridge across the South Para River gorge.
