= Gawler South =

- Suburb
- Coordinates: 34.611°S 138.751°E
- Country: Australia
- State: South Australia
- City: Adelaide
- LGA: Town of Gawler

Government
  - State electorate: Light
  - Federal division: Spence

Population
  - Total: 2,618 (SAL 2021)
- Postcode: 5118
Suburbs around Gawler South
Gawler West	Gawler	Gawler East
Evanston	Gawler South	Kalbeeba
	Evanston Park	Bibaringa

Gawler South is a suburb of the South Australian town of Gawler, located in the northern Adelaide metropolitan area region, 43 km north of Adelaide. It is bordered by the South Para River and the suburbs of Gawler, Gawler West, Evanston, Evanston Park and Bibaringa.

== History ==
Gawler South is a subdivision of the Gawler township. It has streets named from First to Twenty Fourth, originally named with local identities and royal connections. The suburb has attracted a railway station (see below) and tram line (now disused), racecourse, and Anglican Church during its colonial history. After Federation, suburban infill allowed the nightcart lanes installed into these now suburban blocks to stay at the location.

A railway line was built from Adelaide to Gawler in 1879, with the Gawler railway station being established in the Gawler South area. The railway was extended through the Barossa Valley to Angaston in 1911. The Gawler South Station is now still a stationyard for housing trains for the TransAdelaide line to Adelaide.

== Layout ==
The housing lots have been arranged in several different directions. This takes into account the stages of development around the suburb. There is a north–south grid orientation around the south-westerly section of the suburb (by the railway station). The shopping precinct along Adelaide Road provides a grid-fashion at approximately 45 degrees to the south-westerly grid. A Housing Trust subdivision was built in the post-World War II period on the river flats, between the South Para and the Gawler Rivers.

== The suburb today ==
A new subdivision during the 1990s was started on the foothills, adjacent to the South Para River. The shopping precinct is still very commercially viable, extending Gawler's central business district across the Adelaide Road Bridge (on the South Para River) along an almost one kilometre road length.

== Geography ==
Many of the older streets are named for ordinal numbers (First Street through to Twentyfifth Street). There is no obvious pattern to the layout of streets or the order in which they are named. Some streets on the eastern side align to the contours where the land is too steep to build.

== Governance ==
Gawler South is governed at the local level by the Town of Gawler. Gawler South lies in the state electoral district of Light and the federal electoral division of Spence.

== See also ==
- Gawler, South Australia
- South Gawler Football Club
