= Gawler Racecourse railway station =

Railway station in Adelaide, South Australia

Coordinates: 34°36′48″S 138°44′18″E

Gawler Racecourse
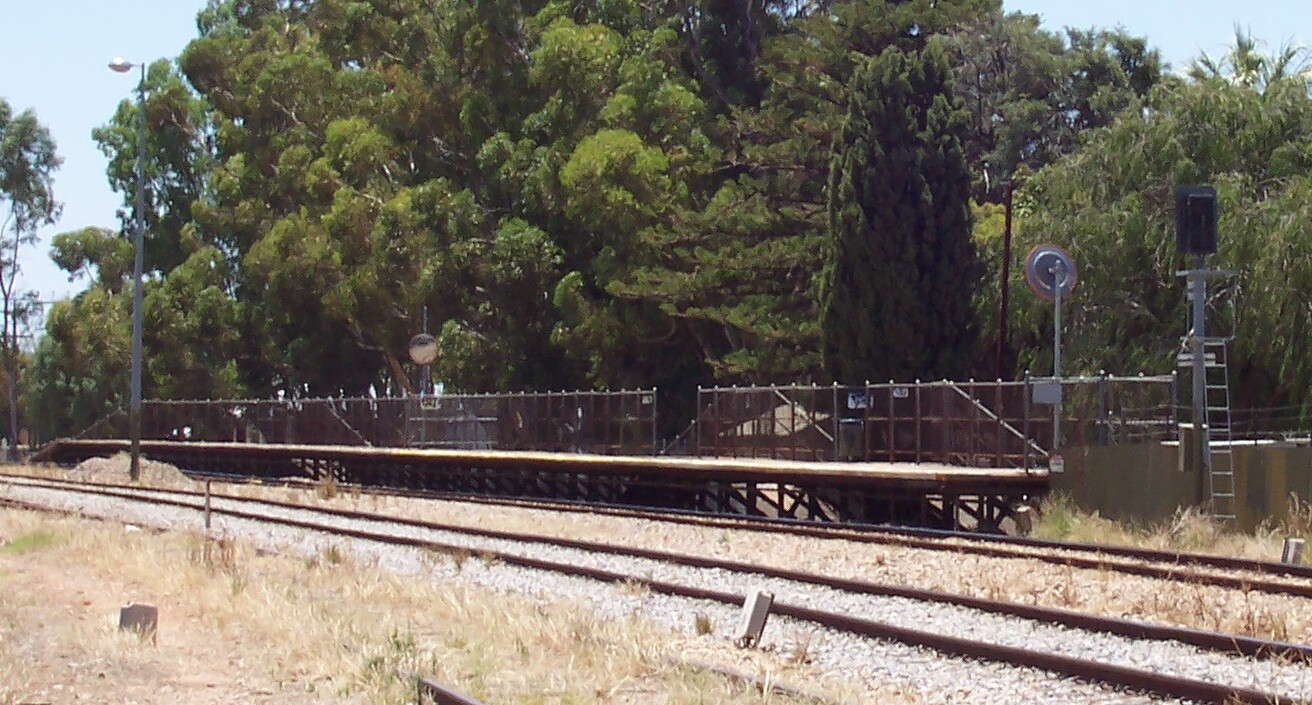
- Northbound view of the station platform, January 2008

General information
- Location: Barnet Road, Evanston; Australia
- Owner: Department for Infrastructure & Transport
- Operator: Adelaide Metro
- Line: Gawler
- Distance: 39.3 km from Adelaide
- Platforms: 1
- Tracks: 2
- Connections: None

Construction
- Structure type: Ground
- Parking: No
- Cycle facilities: No

History
- Opened: 1913

Services
Preceding station	Adelaide Metro	Following station
Evanston towards Adelaide	Gawler line	Gawler towards Gawler Central
Location

Gawler Racecourse railway station is located on the Gawler line. Situated in the northern Adelaide suburb of Evanston, it is 39.3 kilometres (24.4 mi) from Adelaide station.

== History ==
This station was built in 1913 just for racegoers, but it closed shortly after the end of steam suburban trains. The platform is still visible and traces remain of the turning triangle (also called a wye) nearby.

== Services by platform ==
The station is not in regular use, and only opens when horse-racing events are held at Gawler Racecourse.

Platform	Destination	Notes
1	Gawler/Gawler Central/Adelaide	Only opens when horseracing is taking place at Gawler Racecourse.
