= Town of Gawler =

Coordinates: 34°36′S 138°45′E

- Local government area
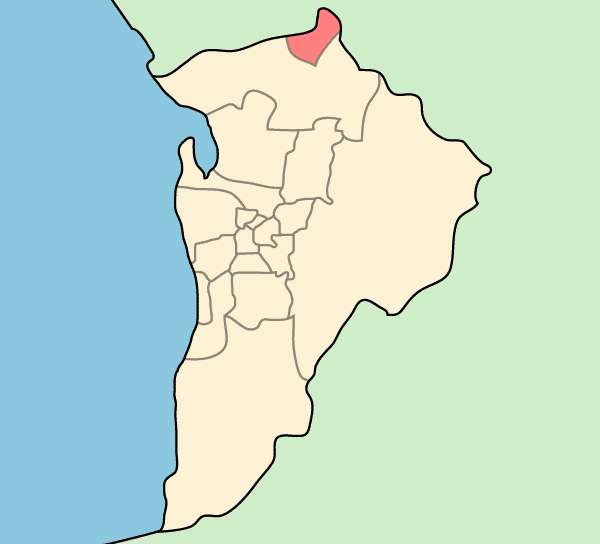

- Interactive map of Town of Gawler
- Country: Australia
- State: South Australia
- Region: Barossa, Light and Lower North
- Established: 1857
- Council seat: Gawler

Government
  - Mayor: Nathan Shanks
  - State electorate: Light
  - Federal division: Spence

Area
  - Total: 41.1 km^{2} (15.9 sq mi)

Population
  - Total: 24,988 (LGA 2021)
  - Density: 608/km^{2} (1,570/sq mi)
- Website: Town of Gawler
LGAs around Town of Gawler
Light Regional Council	Light Regional Council	Light Regional Council
City of Playford	Town of Gawler	Barossa Council
City of Playford	City of Playford	Barossa Council

The Town of Gawler is a local government area located north of Adelaide city centre in South Australia containing Gawler and its suburbs. The corporate town was established in 1857 due to the township's residents' dissatisfaction at being governed by three different district councils.

The Town of Gawler is located within the officially declared boundaries of the Adelaide metropolitan area. As of 2001 1.0% of the population were Indigenous Australian, and 76.3% were born in Australia.

The current mayor of Gawler is Nathan Shanks, who was elected in 2025 following the resignation of long-serving mayor Karen Redman on 30 May 2025.

Shanks was first elected to the Town of Gawler Council as an Area Councillor in 2018. He later served as Deputy Mayor from 2022–2023 and again from 2024–2025, before stepping into the role of Acting Mayor between June and September 2025. His election as Mayor in late 2025 marked the continuation of his long-standing involvement in local government and community leadership.

Redman, who had served as mayor since 2014, was the first elected female mayor in Gawler’s history and was re-elected for further terms in 2018 and 2022 before her resignation in 2025.

== History ==
Local government was established in the area from 1853 with the creation of the District Council of Barossa West (covering the western half of the Hundred of Barossa). Residents of the township of Gawler, at the confluence of the North and South Para rivers, were dissatisfied with the state of local governance. The township intersects four separate cadastral divisions, being at the corners of the hundreds of Mudla Wirra, Nuriootpa, Barossa and Munno Para. As such, the east half of the township was locally governed by the Barossa West council, the western half by the District Council of Mudla Wirra and the southern outskirts by the District Council of Munno Para West. The Barossa West council was seated at Lyndoch some 13 kilometres (8.1 mi) east of the township. The Gawler ratepayers petitioned for their own local government, centred in Gawler, and the Corporation of the Town of Gawler was established on 9 July 1857.

== Council ==
Council consists of 11 Elected Members comprising a Mayor, and 10 Area Councillors.
The current council as of April 2026 is:

Ward	Party Affiliation	Councillor	First elected	Notes
Mayor	Independent	Nathan Shanks	2018	Deputy Mayor 2022-2023, 2024-2025, Acting Mayor 2025 (June - September) Current Mayor 2025
Area Councillor	Labor	Cody Davies	2018	Deputy Mayor 2023-2024
Area Councillor	Independent	Helen Hennessy	2022	
Area Councillor	Independent	David Hughes	2010	Deputy Mayor 2011-2013,2015-2016
Area Councillor	Independent	Mick Launer	2022	
Area Councillor	Labor	Isaac Solomon	2022	Deputy Mayor 2026 - present
Area Councillor	Independent	Brian Sambell	2006	Mayor 2006-2014
Area Councillor	Liberal	Jim Vallelonga	2014	
Area Councillor	Independent	Karen Redman	2010	Mayor 2014-2025 (Resigned May 2025).
Area Councillor	Independent	Paul Koch	2010	Died while in office early 2026.
Area Councillor	Independent	Ethan White	2022	Deputy Mayor 2025 (Resigned January 2026).

=== Mayors ===
As of 2023, 41 people have served as mayor of Gawler in 58 terms of office since the first to hold the position, Richard James Turner, in 1857.

- 1857–1860: Richard James Turner
- 1861–1864: James Martin
- 1865: George Nott
- 1866: John Mitchell
- 1867: Thomas Flett Loutit
- 1867: Thomas Oliver Jones
- 1868: James Martin
- 1869–1870: Edward Clement
- 1871–1872: Thomas Oliver Jones
- 1873–1874: William Faulkner Wincey
- 1875–1876: John Jones
- 1877: James Dawson
- 1877–1878: James Martin
- 1879–1880: Henry Edward Bright Jr
- 1881–1882: Herbert Dean
- 1883: John Charles Wilkinson
- 1884–1885: Leonard Samuel Burton
- 1886: Benjamin Edward Deland
- 1887: James Martin
- 1888: Leonard Samuel Burton
- 1889–1890: John Jones
- 1891–1893: William Henry Cox
- 1894–1895: Edward Lucas
- 1896: William Henry Cox
- 1897–1898: Frank Dixon Harris
- 1899: William Henry Cox
- 1900: Robert King Thomson
- 1901–1902: Charles George Rebbeck
- 1903–1904: George Bright
- 1905–1906: James Fergusson
- 1907: Arthur Smith
- 1908–1909: William M. Dawkins
- 1910–1911: Charles George Rebbeck
- 1912–1913: Frederick David Temby
- 1914–1917: William Henry Cox
- 1918–1919: Hermann Ludwig Marsh
- 1920–1921: James Busbridge Jr
- 1922–1924: William Henry Cox
- 1925–1926: Michael Lynch
- 1927–1929: Dashwood Charles Connor
- 1930: James Busbridge Jr
- 1931–1934: William Henry Cox
- 1934–1938: William Rice
- 1938–1946: William Antwis
- 1946–1952: Adolph Louis Ferdinand Ey (Note: Commonly known as Louis Ey.)
- 1952–1959: Elliott Chivell Goodger
- 1959–1960: Adolph Louis Ferdinand Ey
- 1960–1968: Elliott Chivell Goodger
- 1968–1972: Bruce Charles Eastick
- 1972–1978: Cecil William "Cec" Creedon
- 1978–1989: Gilbert Barry "Gil" Harnett
- 1989–1992: Robert Lethbridge Bartlett
- 1992–1993: Antonio "Tony" Piccolo
- 1993–2000: Bruce Charles Eastick
- 2000–2006: Antonio "Tony" Piccolo
- 2006 (May to Nov): Helena Mary Dawkins
- 2006–2014: Brian Donald Sambell
- 2014–2025: Karen Redman
- 2025–Present: Nathan Christopher Shanks

== Suburbs ==
- Bibaringa (5118) (part; shared with City of Playford)
- Evanston (5116)
- Evanston Gardens (5116)
- Evanston Park (5116) (part; shared with City of Playford)
- Evanston South (5116)
- Gawler (5118)
- Gawler East (5118)
- Gawler South (5118)
- Gawler West (5118)
- Hillier (5116) (part; shared with City of Playford)
- Kudla (5115)
- Reid (5118) (part; shared with Light Regional Council)
- Willaston (5118)

== Waste management and recycling ==
Garbage, recycling, and green waste collection services are provided by the Northern Adelaide Waste Management Authority.

== See also ==
- Gawler, South Australia
- List of Adelaide suburbs
- Local Government Areas of South Australia
