= Tambelin railway station =

Railway station in Adelaide, South Australia

Tambelin
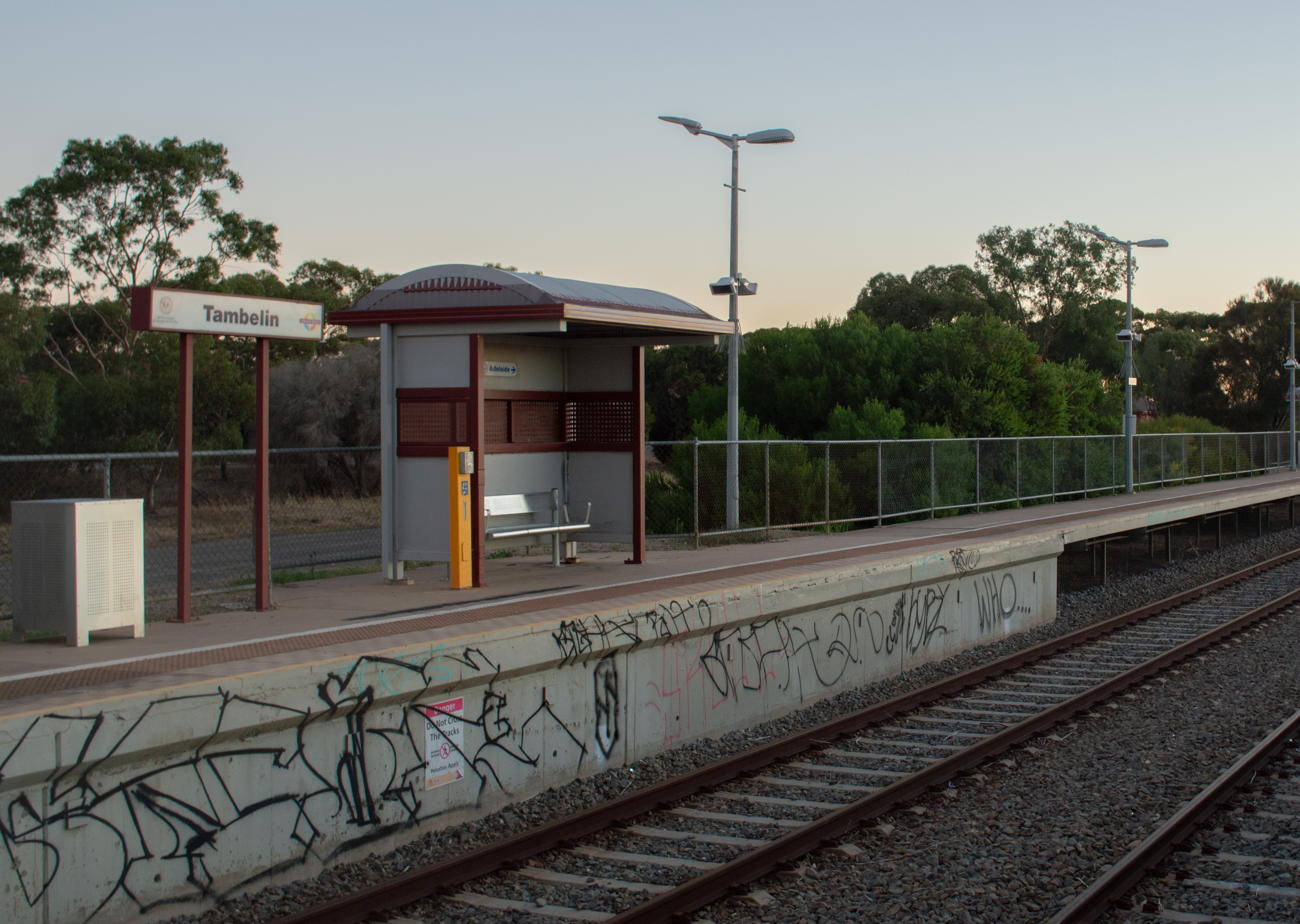
- Southbound view of Platform 2, February 2021

General information
- Location: Dawson Road, Evanston Gardens
- Coordinates: 34°37′43″S 138°43′33″E
- Owner: Department for Infrastructure & Transport
- Operator: Adelaide Metro
- Line: Gawler
- Distance: 37.4 km from Adelaide
- Platforms: 2
- Tracks: 2
- Connections: None

Construction
- Structure type: Ground
- Parking: Yes
- Cycle facilities: No
- Accessible: Yes

Other information
- Station code: 16562 (to City); 18557 (to Gawler Central)
- Website: Adelaide Metro

History
- Rebuilt: 1986

Services
Preceding station	Adelaide Metro	Following station
Kudla towards Adelaide	Gawler line	Evanston towards Gawler Central
Location

Tambelin railway station is located on the Gawler line. Situated in the northern Adelaide suburb of Evanston Gardens, it is 37.4 kilometres (23.2 mi) from the Adelaide station.

== History ==
The sign for Tambelin was erected by the S.A.Railways at a new stopping place near what was then known as the "23-mile crossing" in 1947. The name had not previously been a locality name in the area known as Gawler Blocks. The name Tambelin was chosen by the S.A.R. after consulting the South Australian Nomenclature Committee, as a native name meaning "selecting".

Prior to 1986, Tambelin station had short step-down platforms on the northern side of Clark Road; the present station was built in 1986 on the south side of Clark Road. It has an fully sealed carpark and serves Trinity College via a footpath underneath the Gawler Bypass.

== Platforms and Services ==
Tambelin has two side platforms and is serviced by Adelaide Metro. It is a designated high-frequency station, with trains scheduled every 15 minutes on weekdays, between 7:30am and 6:30pm.

Platform	Destination
1	Gawler and Gawler Central
2	Adelaide
