= Gawler Aerodrome =

Airport in South Australia

- IATA: none; ICAO: YGAW

Summary
- Airport type: Private
- Owner: Light Regional Council
- Operator: Adelaide Soaring Club
- Location: Gawler, South Australia, Australia
- Elevation AMSL: 165 ft / 50 m
- Coordinates: 34°36′00″S 138°43′08″E
- Website: www.adelaidesoaring.org.au

Map
- Location in South Australia

Runways
| Direction | Length | | Surface |
| Direction | m | ft | Surface |
|---|---|---|---|
| 23/05 | 1,245 | 4,084 | Gravel, Bitumen and Grass |
| 13/31 | 1,034 | 3,392 | Gravel, Bitumen and Grass |

Gawler Aerodrome is located in Gawler, South Australia. The aerodrome is owned by the Light Regional Council of South Australia and is managed on their behalf by the Adelaide Soaring Club (ASC).

The ASC moved to Gawler from Virginia in 1950 and has been flying gliders at Gawler ever since. In 1998 the club spread its wings further and ventured into the world of powered flight in the Recreational Aviation category with the purchase of an Australian made Jabiru. All of the instructors are volunteers and fully qualified which makes training at the ASC very affordable. The ASC continues to train pilots in both Gliding and Light Sports Aircraft (LSA) today and maintains a modern fleet of aircraft.

The Gawler Airfield Squadron of the Australian Air League, a national uniformed cadet organisation promoting and encouraging the interest of aviation and flying training in the youth of Australia, is also located at Gawler Aerodrome.

The Country Fire Service (CFS) operates its water bombers from this airfield during the bush fire season as required. The location of the airfield has been instrumental in fighting bush fires in this region including the 2015 Sampson Flat bushfires and 2015 Pinery bushfire.

== History ==
The aerodrome was built during World War II by the Royal Australian Air Force (RAAF) in 1941 and was used as an RAAF Station. An operations building, remote receiving building and transmitting building were constructed as part of the facilities.

=== Units based at Gawler Aerodrome ===
- Adelaide Wireless Transmitting (W/T) Station – detachment
- Gawler Telecommunications Unit RAAF
- No. 11 Works Supply Unit
- No. 21 Squadron RAAF
- No. 86 Squadron RAAF

=== Motorsport ===
In the early 1950s, the aerodrome hosted several motor racing events. The first of these was held on 12 June 1950 on adjacent paddocks, but from 11 June 1951 races were held on a circuit laid out on the aerodrome's runways, with minor changes to the layout but always approximately 2 miles (3.2 km) long. Racing ceased after 1953 due to the opening of the Port Wakefield Circuit.

== See also ==
- List of airports in South Australia
