= May Brothers and Company =

- Company type: Industrial manufacturer
- Industry: Mining, agriculture, manufacture.
- Founded: 1885 (dissolved 1934)
- Founder: Frederick May, Alfred May
- Headquarters: Gawler, South Australia
- Number of locations: Gawler, Port Pirie
- Products: Agricultural cultivating and harvesting implements and machinery; mining machinery.

May Brothers and Company was an engineering and manufacturing firm founded in Gawler, South Australia in 1885 by Frederick and Alfred May.

== History ==
(John) Frederick May (1840 – 15 December 1897) and Alfred May (6 December 1851 – 22 September 1920) were two children in a family of nine of Perranzabuloe, Cornwall who emigrated to Adelaide, arriving in December 1858. Upon arrival, the family travelled north to the mining town of Burra, where Frederick, (then aged 18), gained employment in a copper mine with his father Henry (1818 – 16 March 1872) and two brothers, William (1838 – 8 August 1914) and Joseph (1844 – 2 November 1922). Alfred, who was only seven at the time, attended school until the age of 15 when he then began work as a "picky-boy" – a menial job involving sorting ore on the surface of the mine.

Although not formally qualified in engineering, Frederick's keen interest and skill in machinery meant that he was soon promoted to the position of mine engineer, overseeing the installation of a steam-powered lift in the Schneider shaft in Burra. The fact that workers could obtain better positions in the new colonies based on skill and merit was one of the reasons Frederick's father had chosen to bring his family to Australia.

During the 1860s, the part of Yorke Peninsula known as the Copper Triangle – in particular the towns of Moonta, Wallaroo and Kadina – experienced a mining boom. Towns were growing quicker than mining equipment could be built and installed, and engineers were in high demand. Frederick's skill and efficiency at the Schneider shaft had earned him a reputation, and in 1861 he was appointed by pastoralist and mining magnate, Walter Watson Hughes, as chief engineer at the Moonta mine.

In 1862 Frederick married Mary Ann Mitchell, and in 1873 he took on Alfred, (then aged 20), as an apprentice engineer.

In 1873 Frederick was approached by industrialist James Martin. His company James Martin & Co was a manufacturer of mining and agricultural implements, and his foundry in Gawler was the largest in the area, employing at times over 700 men. Martin aimed to expand operations and offered Frederick a partnership which he accepted in February 1874. Frederick secured a position for Alfred in 1875 as the foreman of the fitting shop.

Frederick remained partner with James Martin until 1885, when he decided to establish his own business with Alfred. On 28 February the partnership between Frederick May and James Martin was dissolved. The foundations for May Brothers were laid in July that year.

== Location ==
The May Brothers shop and foundry was located on 4 acres (1.6 ha) of land situated on the southern side of Gawler, strategically placed next to the railway lines. Frederick himself drew the plans, and it is said the brothers literally established the foundations by marking out and laying concrete for the floors. Later, operations extended and a branch was opened in Port Pirie. The name May Town, near Port Pirie, is reported to possibly have come from the May Brothers and Company branch situated there.

== Inventions and designs ==
At first the firm concentrated on essential items for farms, factories and mining, but Frederick's inventive nature, reflected in his philosophy "It's not enough to simply give people what they want; we must make things they haven’t even thought about yet...", meant he was continually designing new products. Both he had his brother were prolific in their designs, and the number of patents taken out during the company's lifetime is testimony to this: Frederick patented numerous designs before the start of May Brothers& Co., Gawler. Two other brothers Matthew and Joseph also joined the firm in later years as employees of the firm

In 1887, at the Adelaide Jubilee International Exhibition, held in the new Exhibition Building on North Terrace, May Brothers entered seven general machinery exhibits and eight agricultural machinery exhibits, and took home first place in every category. The unveiling of their Damp Weather Threshing and Reaping Machine at the exhibit was met with especially good reviews. For a young business finding it difficult to gain the trust of Australian farmers who preferred importing machinery from larger more established companies in the US and Britain, the success of the exhibit was a great advertisement.

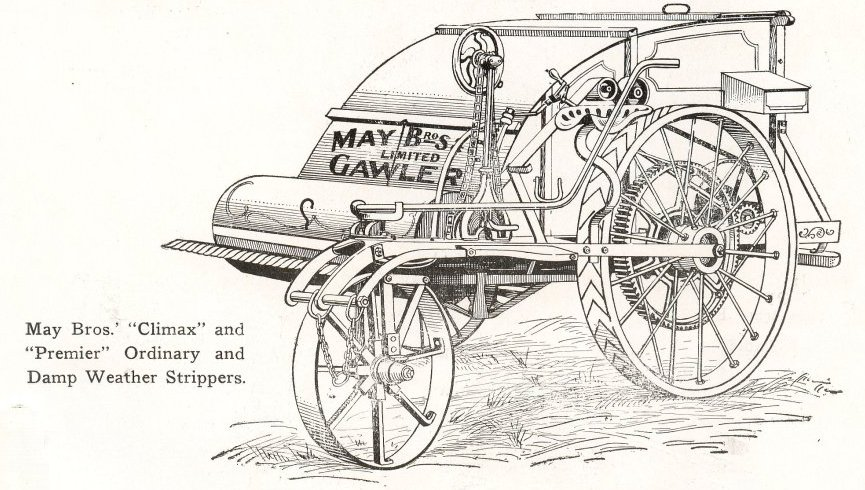
May Brothers Damp Weather Thresher and Reaper, as featured in the "Australasian Implement & Housing Furnishing Co. Catalogue 1916–17"

The May Brothers Patent Compound Jigger was another breakthrough invention for the firm, although one that took the mining community – who were hesitant about the new company – some convincing. The jigger, a concentrator that treated ore on the surface, was unveiled shortly after the Jubilee Exhibit in 1887, and an order from the Umberrumberka mine in New South Wales arrived within months. It was the first of its kind in use on the field

A pair of 1000 horsepower winding engines built for the Delprat Shaft in Broken Hill in 1900/1901 were designed by head draughtsmen John Wesley, draughtsman William J. May, and Alfred May, and the engineering team which William then converted into the final drawings. The showing of these engines under steam was done under Alfred and William J. May's management partners of the firm. It broke world records in performance output for its type. In 1910, he unveiled the Climax Complete Harvester, which cut a seven-foot swathe and enabled one man to strip, clean and bag 20 acres (8 ha) of wheat in one day. The firm had grown from a five-man operation to having 360 on the payroll, and very few Australian farms or mines were without at least one of the May Brothers' inventions.

== Later years ==
After the death of his wife in 1896, Frederick retired from business and moved to the Largs Pier Hotel where he took up residence. There, he met a widow named Margaret Dick whom he married in a ceremony in Laura. A few weeks after returning to their Semaphore home, Frederick died of heart complications. He was only 57 years old.

Frederick's eldest sons, Frederick, Jr., and William J. May became Alfred's new partners in May Brothers & Co., Gawler and Port Pirie. Later, Alfred and partners incorporated the partnership into a company.

In 1911 Alfred retired from the company and moved his family to Adelaide. However, from then until his death in 1920, he remained active in the company and continued to contribute to designs. In 1917 he designed the "Acme" harvester – the biggest of its kind with a swathe of 10 feet 6 inches (3.20 m), but light enough for only five horses to pull.

The declaration of war with Germany in 1914 meant that May Brothers and Company was busier than ever, especially with many of its own employees enlisted in the war overseas. The 1920s brought increased competition from Australian companies, such as David Shearer and Sunshine Harvester Works, The company was suffering. In an effort to diversify, they attempted to break into the automobile market by forming a public company with J. H. Jones of Adelaide, appointing former South Australian premier Sir Richard Butler as chairman. The company failed, but was quickly followed by another venture that combined May Brothers and Company with the Perry Engineering Company, a firm founded by Frederick's original partner, James Martin. The new company concentrated on the manufacture of harvesters. It began hopefully, but was unable to build up enough momentum by the time the Great Depression struck. Unable to meet costs, the company was liquidated in 1928, and all that remains now of the workshop and foundry in Gawler is the street bearing its name.

== Community relations ==
In accordance with their Wesleyan Methodist doctrine, the May Brothers were involved in many services to their community. From 1881 to 1884, Frederick sat on the local Gawler Council representing the East Ward. He was Vice President of the Gawler Agricultural Society; a member of the council of the Gawler School of Mines; a member of the Geological and Mineralogical Society; a member of the Freemasons' Fidelity Lodge, and at one point, was captain of the Gawler Fire Brigade. His skill at design extended beyond engineering to that of architecture, and not only did he design his firm's shop and foundry, he also designed (pro bono) the Bible Christian Churches at Moonta and Kadina, and the Wesleyan Church at Moonta.

Alfred was also an active member of the community. He, too, was a member of the Freemasons' Fidelity Lodge, a member of numerous Methodist Church committees, was involved in local bands, acted as President of the Gawler School of Mines and was a founding member of the Gawler Bowls Club. Alfred's relationships with his employees were strong, and in 1905 when Jim Caskey, a 46-year-old worker, was caught between an overhead shaft and a driving gear, and the company suffered its first fatal accident in 25 years, Alfred ensured that Caskey's widow and children were provided for. In an era where statutory workers' compensation was still 81 years away, the act was considered unusual, and was the subject of much debate.

== Local Football ==
The May brothers had a close connection with local football. In 1894 Alfred's son, Alfred Fred Jr, was one of the two first South Gawler Football Club players to graduate to league football in South Australia. From 1919 to 1923, the May Brothers Foundry was home to the team's clubrooms.

== Recognition ==
In 1986, during South Australia's 150th Jubilee celebrations, Frederick May was named one of the 150 individuals to have made an outstanding contribution to the state's development. A personalised plaque in his honour can be found in the footpath of North Terrace, Adelaide, as part of the Jubilee 150 Walkway.

== May Brothers today ==
In 2008 May Brothers was re-established in Adelaide by Jason May, the great-grandson of Alfred May. The firm now specialises in project management and development, focusing on innovations in energy, information technology, infrastructure and the environment.

== See also ==
- List of South Australian manufacturing businesses
