= Northern Adelaide Waste Management Authority =

Northern Adelaide Waste Management Authority or NAWMA is a garbage, recycling, and green waste collection service for City of Salisbury, City of Playford, and the Town of Gawler in the northern suburbs of Adelaide, South Australia.

== History ==
NAWMA was formed under the Local Government Act (SA) 1999 to provide waste management and resource recovery services. It receives and processes material on behalf of its three constituent city councils as well as providing waste management services to private industry.

On 3 March 2009, all bins within the tri-council area were replaced apart from green waste bins. Skinny rubbish bins were replaced with short fat square bins with red lids, and the octagon recycling bins were replaced with square bins of the same size with a yellow lid. NAWMA's mascot is a woman called Nawma with green permed hair and usually a green sweater with a big "N" on the front.
