= Evanston Gardens, South Australia =

Evanston Gardens
- Suburb
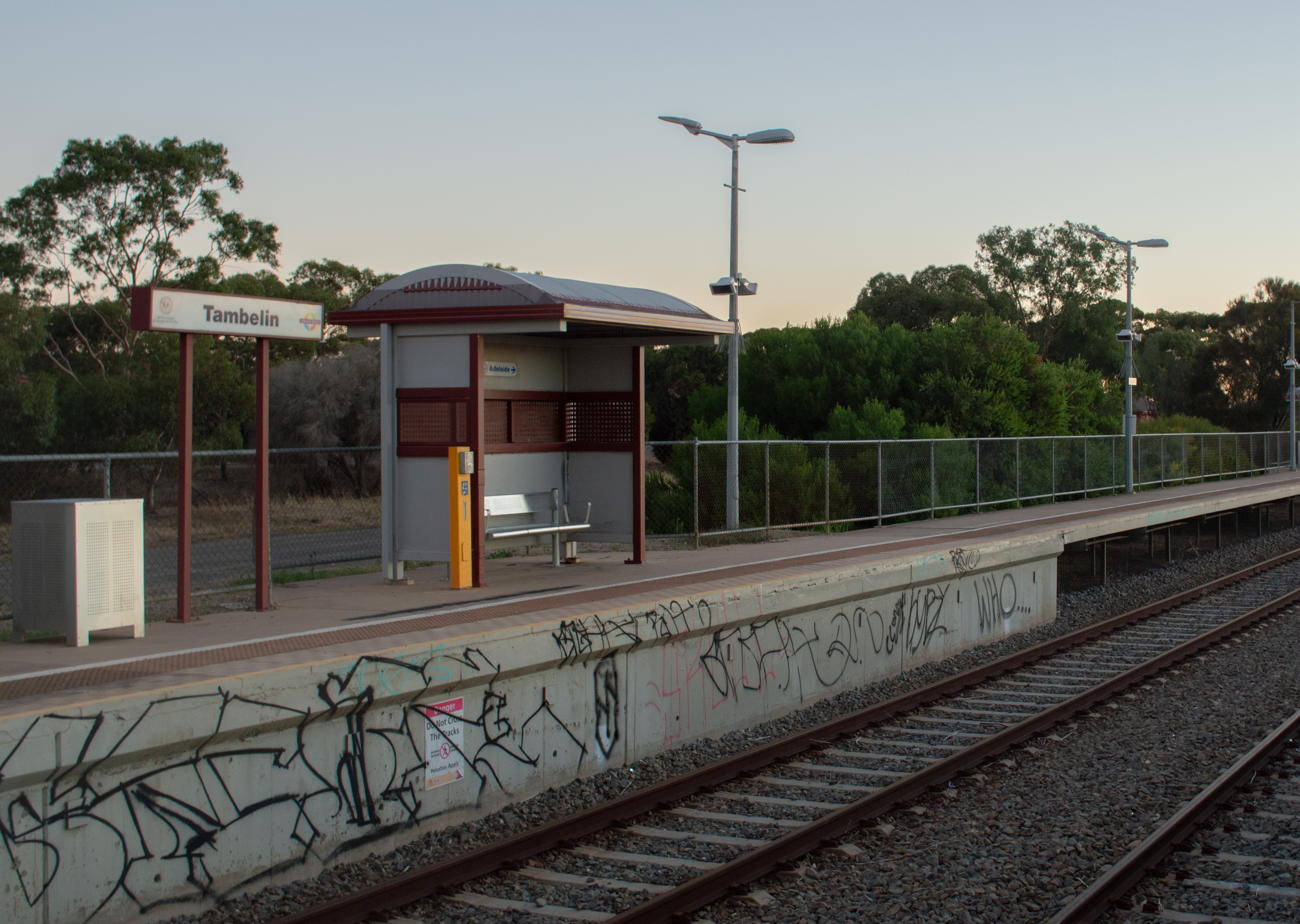
- Tambelin Railway Station in Evanston Gardens

- Coordinates: 34.624°S 138.722°E
- Country: Australia
- State: South Australia
- City: Adelaide
- LGA: Town of Gawler
- Location: 35 km (22 mi) NE of Adelaide city centre

Government
  - State electorate: Light (2011)
  - Federal division: Spence

Population
  - Total: 2,347 (SAL 2021)
- Postcode: 5116
Suburbs around Evanston Gardens
| Hillier | Hillier | Evanston |
| Hillier | Evanston Gardens | Evanston, Evanston South |
| Kudla | Kudla, Evanston South | Evanston South |

Evanston Gardens is an outer northern suburb of Adelaide, South Australia. It is located in the Town of Gawler.

== Geography ==
The suburb lies astride Angle Vale Road and is bounded on the east by the Sturt Highway (Gawler Bypass).

== Demographics ==
The 2006 Census by the Australian Bureau of Statistics counted 770 persons in Evanston Gardens on census night. Of these, 50.6% were male and 49.4% were female.

The majority of residents (78.3%) are of Australian birth, with an additional 8.4% identifying England as their country of birth.

The age distribution of Evanston Gardens residents is similar to that of the greater Australian population. 62.6% of residents were over 25 years in 2006, compared to the Australian average of 66.5%; and 37.4% were younger than 25 years, compared to the Australian average of 33.5%.

== Community ==
Local newspapers include the News Review Messenger and The Bunyip. Other regional and national newspapers such as The Plains Producer, The Advertiser and The Australian are also available.

=== Schools ===
Evanston Gardens Primary School is located on Angle Vale Road.

== Facilities and attractions ==
=== Parks ===
Karbeethon Reserve lies on Angle Vale Road. There are parks elsewhere in the suburb, particularly on Hindmarsh Boulevard.

== Transportation ==
=== Roads ===
Evanston Gardens is serviced by Angle Vale Road, indirectly connecting the suburb to both Port Wakefield Road and the Sturt Highway.

=== Public transport ===
Evanston Gardens is serviced by public transport run by the Adelaide Metro.

==== Trains ====
The Gawler railway line passes through the suburb. The closest station is Tambelin.

== See also ==
- List of Adelaide suburbs
