= Gawler railway station =

Railway station in Adelaide, South Australia

Gawler
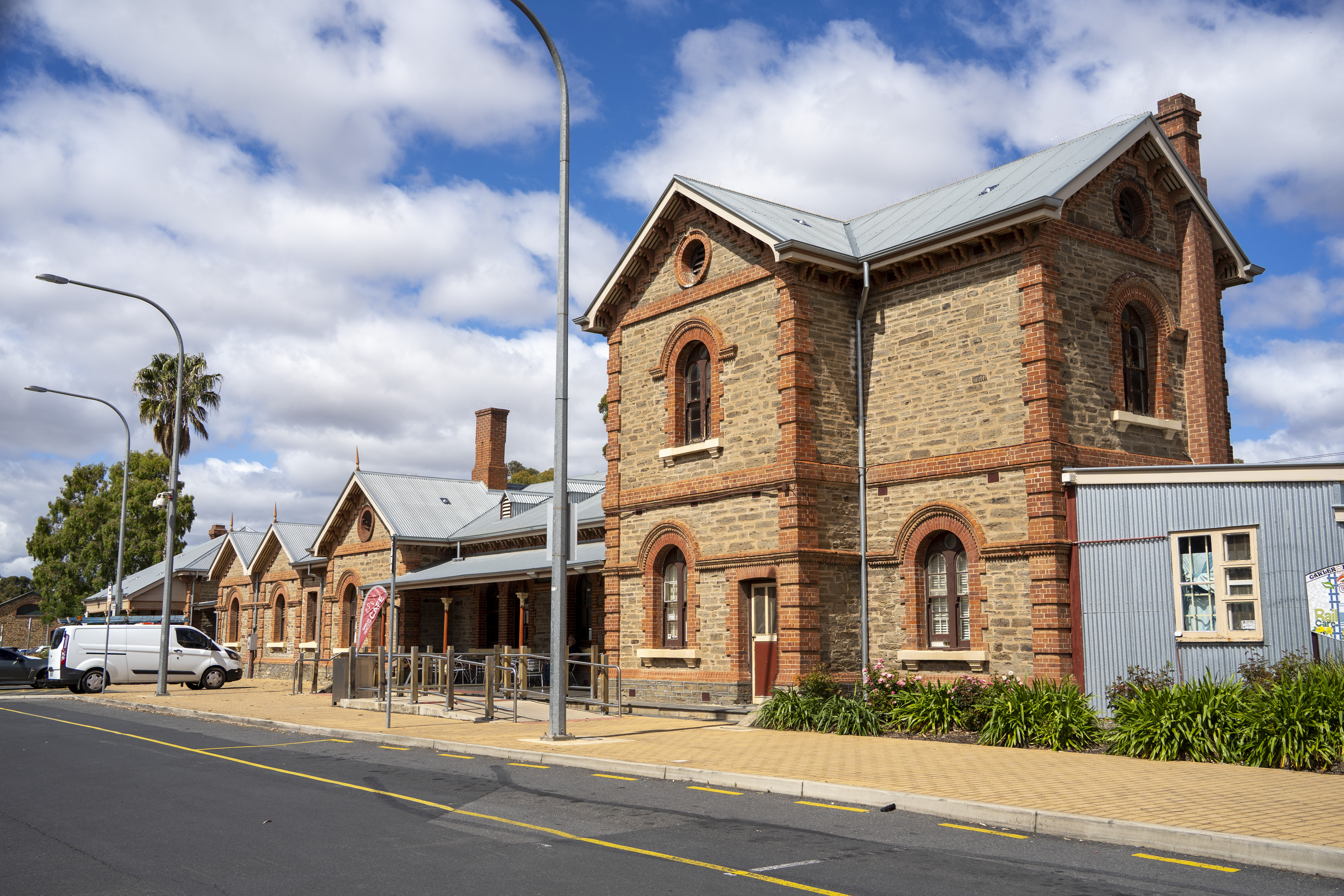
- Southbound view of the station building, November 2025

General information
- Location: Twentythird Street, Gawler South
- Coordinates: 34°36′30″S 138°44′23″E
- Owner: Department for Infrastructure & Transport
- Operator: Adelaide Metro; originally South Australian Railways
- Line: Gawler
- Distance: 39.8 km from Adelaide
- Platforms: 3
- Tracks: 3
- Connections: Bus Regional Bus

Construction
- Structure type: Ground
- Parking: Yes
- Cycle facilities: Yes
- Accessible: Yes

Other information
- Station code: 16517 (to City); 18559 (to Gawler Central)
- Website: Adelaide Metro

History
- Opened: 5 October 1857
- Rebuilt: 1872 & 2012

Services
Preceding station	Adelaide Metro	Following station
Evanston towards Adelaide	Gawler line	Gawler Oval towards Gawler Central
Gawler Racecourse towards Adelaide	Gawler line Special Events Only	Gawler Oval towards Gawler Central
Smithfield towards Adelaide	Gawler line	Gawler Oval towards Gawler Central
Preceding station	Aurizon	Following station
Gawler Racecourse towards Adelaide	Roseworthy-Peterborough railway line	Roseworthy towards Peterborough
Location

Gawler railway station is located on the Gawler line. Situated in the South Australian town of Gawler, it is 39.8 kilometres (24.7 mi) from Adelaide station.

== History ==
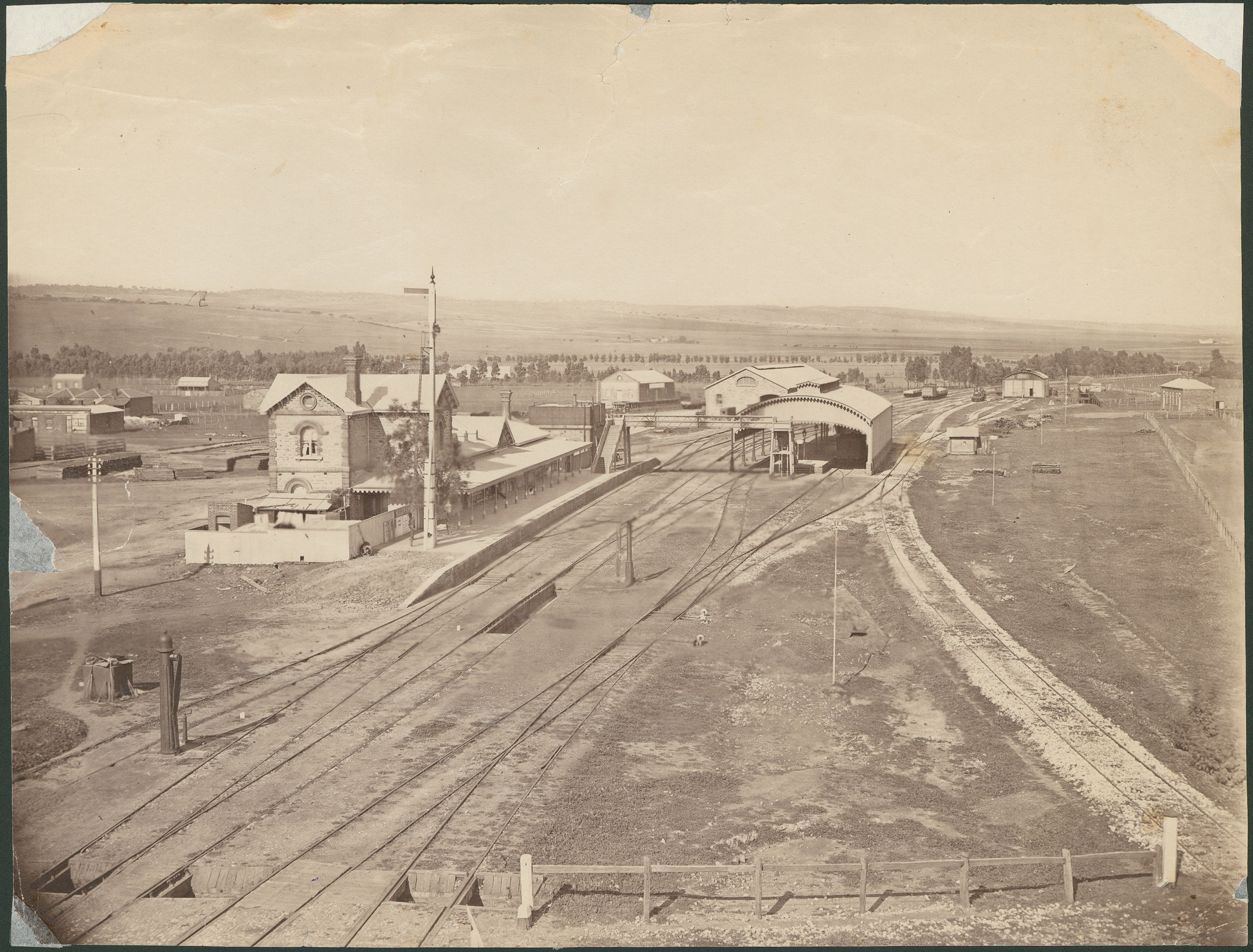
Gawler station, looking south, about 1880

Gawler station opened on Monday 5th October 1857 as the terminus of the Gawler line. It was built on pastoral land owned by the local parliamentary member of the period. The original platform building was replaced in 1879. Subsequently, a horse-drawn tram serviced Gawler's main street (Murray Street), almost a kilometre away. The tramway handled both passengers and goods, with several goods sidings, and a connection to the main line to facilitate the delivery of locomotives built by James Martin & Co. The railway was extended to Roseworthy and Kapunda in 1860 then to Morgan in 1878.

With the opening of the Barossa Valley line in 1911, Gawler became a junction station, and North Gawler station (now named Gawler Central) was built which eventually led to closure of the tramway. Further branches from both railway lines meant Gawler Station was quite busy. Neither line is now used beyond the metropolitan transit, and the current station contains a kiosk and three platforms. South of the station, lie stabling sidings for Adelaide Metro's rolling stock. The station marks the end of the double track section from Adelaide, with the line becoming single track just north of the station.

The Gawler Lions Club has adopted the station for restoration work. It now houses an art gallery, displaying local artists, and is open on weekends. The club also successfully lobbied for a steam engine built by James Martin & Sons, previously located on Thomas Terrace between the Gawler Oval and Gawler Central stations. The locomotive is also in the process of being restored. An upgrade of the station was completed in March 2012: the heritage train shed was dismantled for restoration off-site, both platforms were upgraded, and a new toilet was installed.

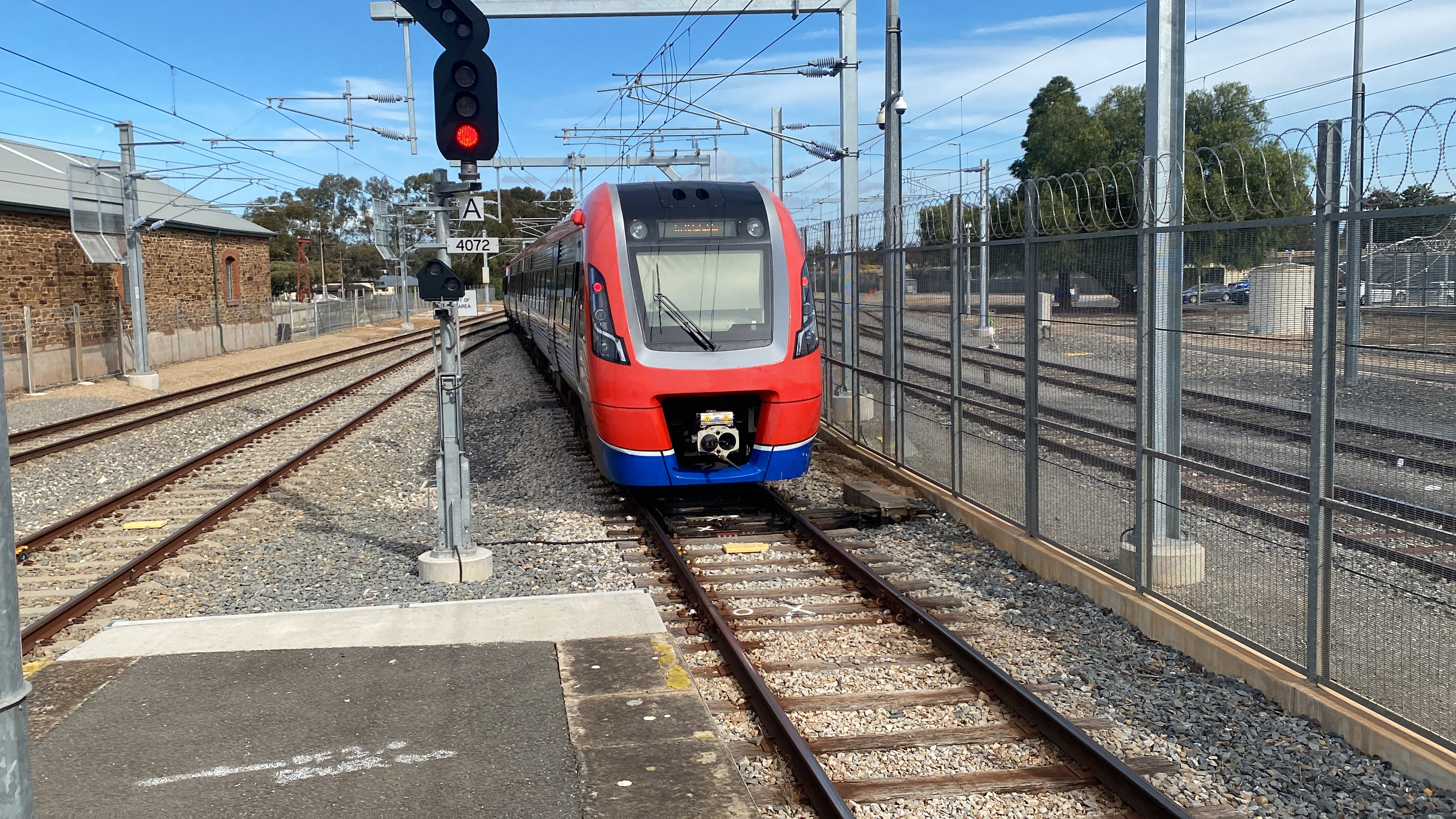
Adelaide Metro 4000 class electric train departing Gawler station in 2024.

Railway electrification to Gawler began in 2018 and was completed in June 2022 following delays due to the COVID-19 pandemic and the 2022 state election.

== Platforms and Services ==
Gawler has one side platform and one island platform, and is serviced by Adelaide Metro. It is a designated high-frequency station, with trains scheduled every 15 minutes on weekdays, between 7:30am and 6:30pm.

Platform	Destination/s	Notes
1	Gawler Central/Adelaide	Mostly used for terminating services from Adelaide, no passenger services during weekends
2	Gawler Central/Adelaide	Mostly used in peak hours during weekdays, also some terminating services from Adelaide, no passenger services during weekends
3	Gawler Central/Adelaide	Mostly used for services to Adelaide and Gawler Central, all passenger services use this platform during weekends

== Transport Links ==
Bus transfers: Stop 146 Gawler railway station
Route no.	Destination & route details
491	Willaston and Hewett loop, via Murray St, Osprey Pde and Gawler Town Centre
492	Gawler East loop, via Gawler Town Centre; Route 429A is anti-clockwise and 429C is clockwise
493	Evanston loop, via Evanston Park, Tambelin Station and Gawler Town Centre
810	Gawler to Angaston; Service is operated by LinkSA
811	Evanston and Gawler to Angaston via Lyndoch and Williamstown; Service is operated by LinkSA

== In popular culture ==
The station building has appeared in a number of films and television shows, including The Shiralee and McLeod's Daughters.
