= Evanston railway station =

Railway station in Adelaide, South Australia

Coordinates: 34°37′15″S 138°43′56″E

Evanston
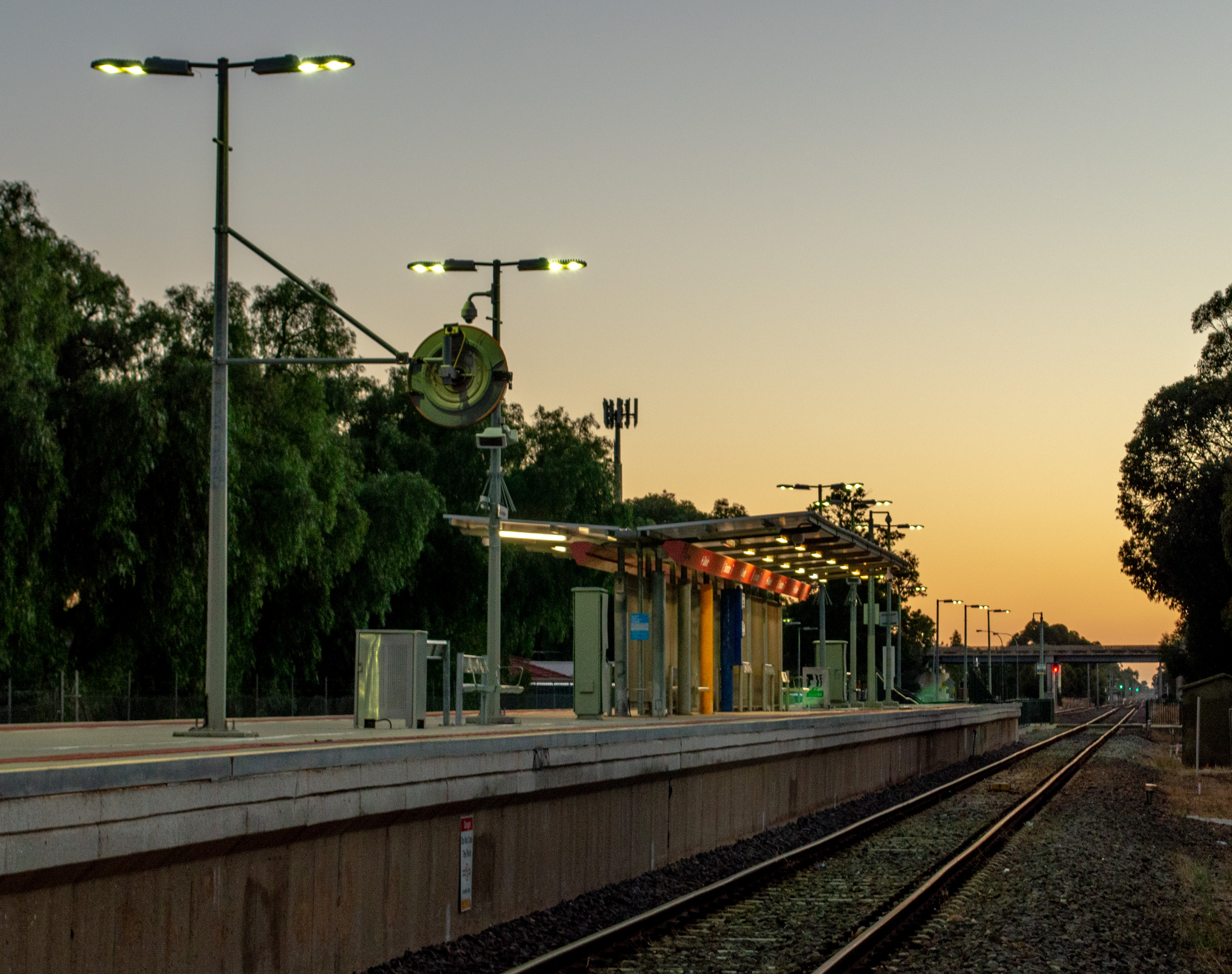
- South-west bound view of Platform 1, February 2021

General information
- Location: Railway Crescent, Evanston
- Owner: Department for Infrastructure & Transport
- Operator: Adelaide Metro
- Line: Gawler
- Distance: 38.3 km from Adelaide
- Platforms: 2
- Tracks: 2
- Bus routes: None

Construction
- Structure type: Ground
- Parking: No
- Cycle facilities: Yes
- Accessible: Yes

Other information
- Station code: 16562 (to City); 18557 (to Gawler Central)
- Website: Adelaide Metro

Services
Preceding station	Adelaide Metro	Following station
Tambelin towards Adelaide	Gawler line	Gawler towards Gawler Central
Tambelin towards Adelaide	Gawler line Special Events	Gawler Racecourse towards Gawler Central
Location

Evanston railway station is located on the Gawler line. Situated in the northern Adelaide suburb of Evanston, it is 38.3 kilometres (23.8 mi) from Adelaide station.

== History ==
In 2008, the South Australian Government began a decade-long multibillion-dollar investment in Adelaide's public transport system designed to transform it into a state-of-the-art system providing faster, greener, more frequent, safer and more efficient services for train, tram and bus commuters. In March 2012, an upgrade of the station was completed.

== Platforms and Services ==
Evanston has an island platform and is serviced by Adelaide Metro. Trains are scheduled every 30 minutes, seven days a week.

Platform	Destination
1	Gawler and Gawler Central
2	Adelaide
