= Gawler =

- Town
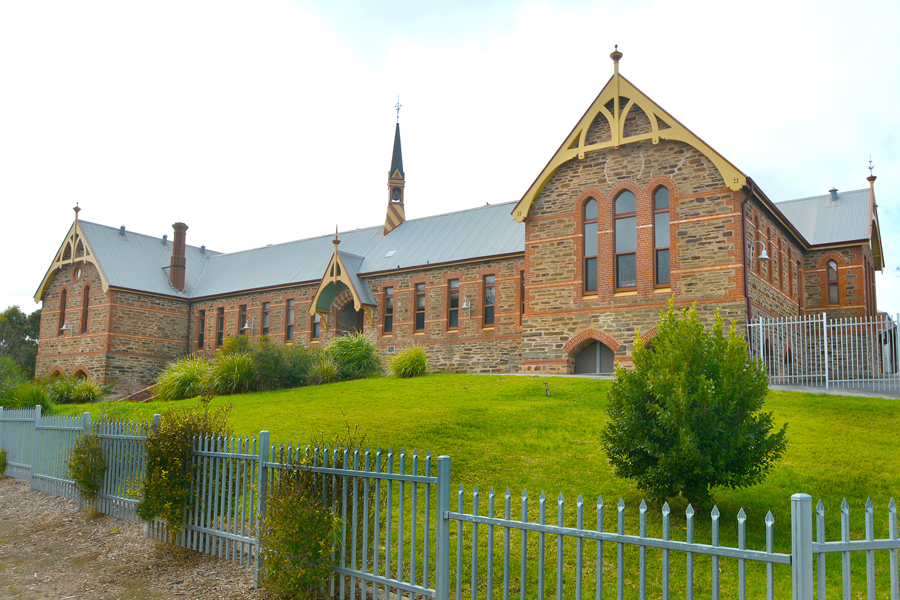
- Gawler Primary School

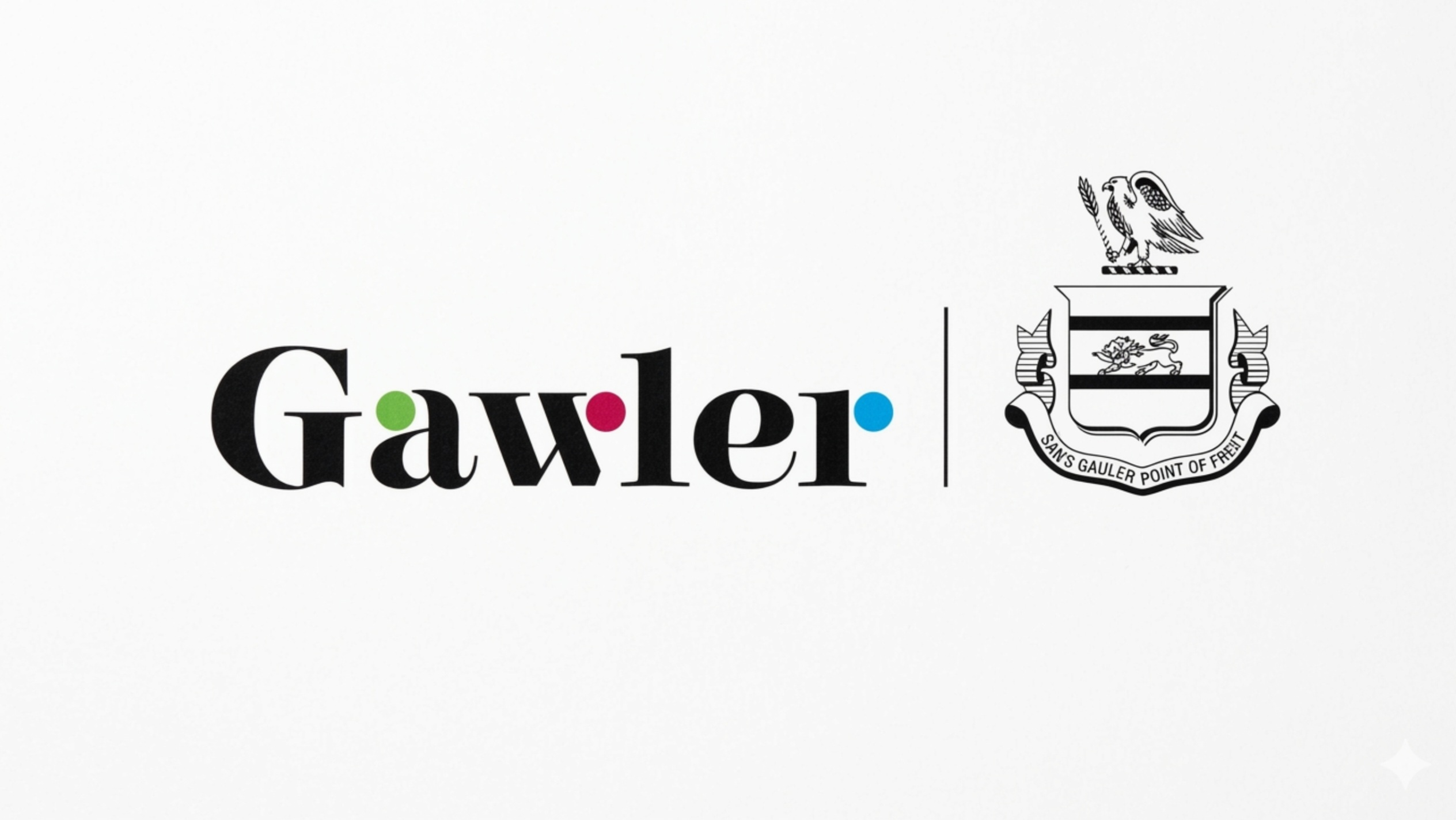
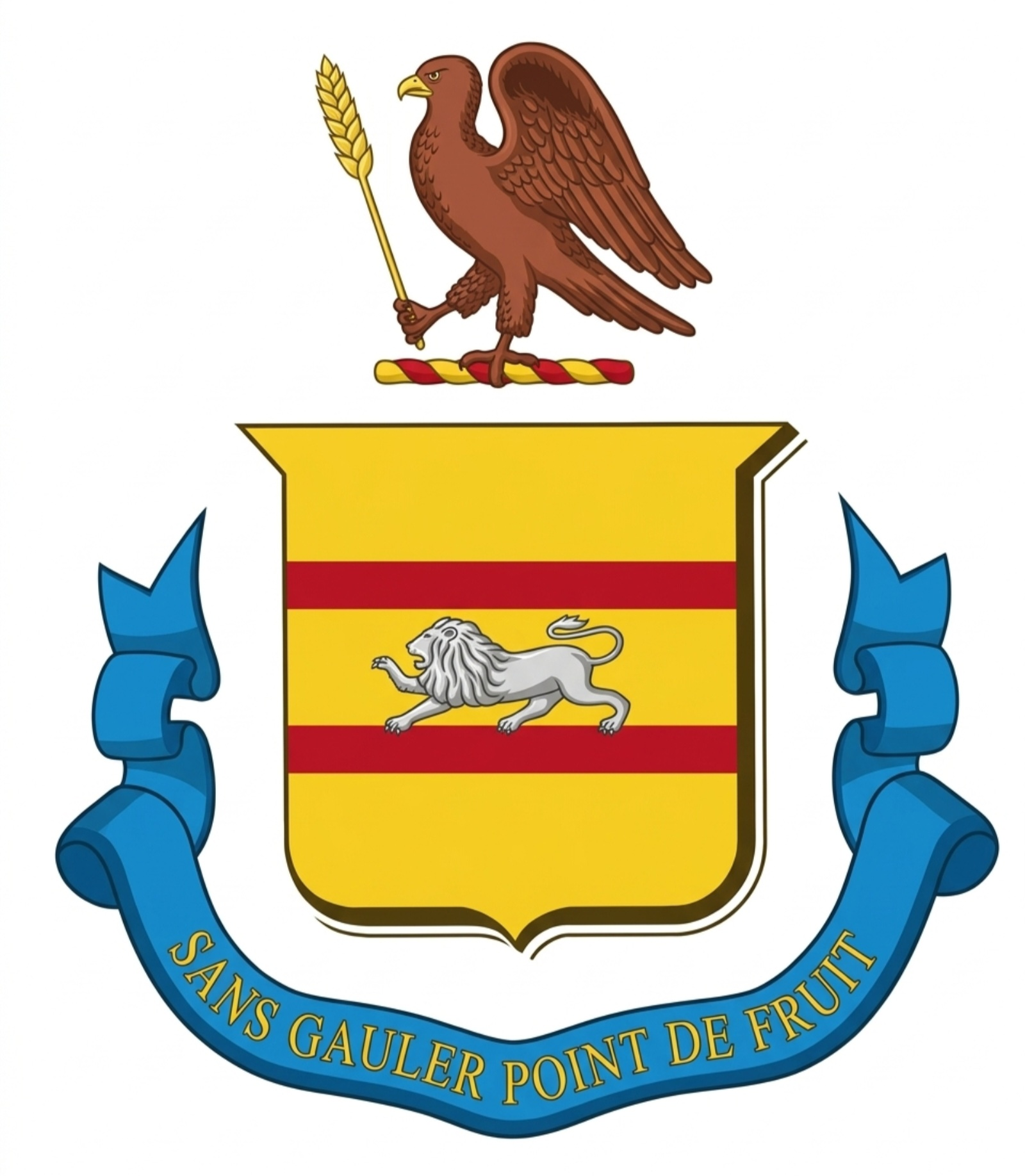
- Flag Seal

- Coordinates: 34°35′53″S 138°44′42″E
- Country: Australia
- State: South Australia
- LGA: Town of Gawler
- Location: 40 km (25 mi) N of Adelaide city centre
- Established: 1839

Government
  - State electorate: Light
  - Federal division: Spence
- Elevation: 75 m (246 ft)

Population
  - Total: 28,562 (UCL 2021)
- Postcode: 5118
- Mean max temp: 22.4 °C (72.3 °F)
- Mean min temp: 10.3 °C (50.5 °F)
- Annual rainfall: 440.3 mm (17.33 in)
Localities around Gawler
| Willaston | Willaston | Willaston |
| Willaston | Gawler | Gawler East |
| Willaston | Gawler South | Gawler East |

Gawler, established in 1839, is an old country town in the state of South Australia. It was named after the second Governor (British Vice-Regal representative) of the colony of South Australia, George Gawler. It is about 40–44 km (25–27 mi) north of the state capital, Adelaide, and is close to the major wine producing district of the Barossa Valley. Topographically, Gawler lies at the confluence of two tributaries of the Gawler River, the North and South Para rivers, where they emerge from a range of low hills.

Historically a semi-rural area, Gawler has been swept up in Adelaide's growth in recent years, and is now counted as a suburb in the Outer Metro region of the Greater Adelaide Planning Region. The town had a population of 28,562 in the 2021 Census.

== History ==
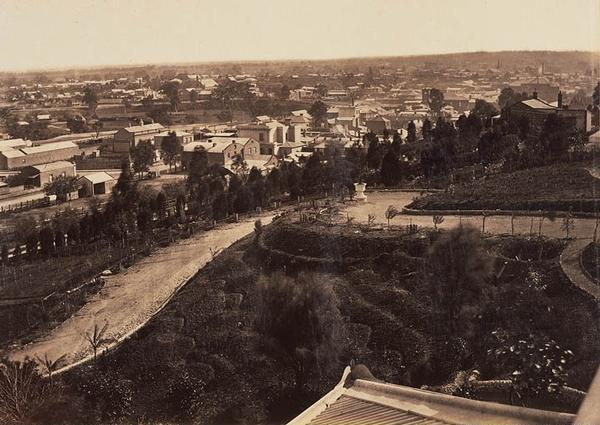
Gawler in around 1869

The Kaurna people are indigenous to the Adelaide Plains. A British colony, South Australia was established as a commercial venture by the South Australia Company through the sale of land to free settlers at £1 per acre (£2/9/5d or £2.47 per hectare).

The township of Gawler was established to cater for travellers to the mid-north of the colony, and in 1840 consisted of "a very good inn, one public house, police barracks, two smiths' shops, six dwelling-houses, and thirty-four inhabitants". A 4,000-acre (1,600 ha) special survey was applied for by Stephen King, H. Dundas Murray, (Note: Henry Dundas Murray, for whom Murray Street was named, arrived in South Australia by the Orleana. He founded "Turretfield", married Jane Lewis of Smithfield in 1858, then in 1860 sold up his Gawler interests and with his two sons left for New Zealand. He appears not to be closely related to A. B. Murray.) and a syndicate of ten other colonists. The survey for Murray's syndicate was carried out in 1839 by William Jacob for the firm of Light, Finniss, & Company, of which Colonel William Light (died 6 October 1839) was a founder. By 1842 Gawler had a main thoroughfare named Murray Street, and a town square named Light Square.

Thanks to Colonel Light, Adelaide was a model of foresight with wide streets and ample parklands. After Light's death, it became a model for numerous other planned towns in South Australia (many of which were never built). Gawler is dissimilar to Adelaide's one square mile (2.6 km²) grid; the heart of Gawler is triangular rather than square, a form dictated by the topographical features. The parkland along the riverbanks and a Victorian preference for public squares are present, but Gawler was a village, not a metropolis.

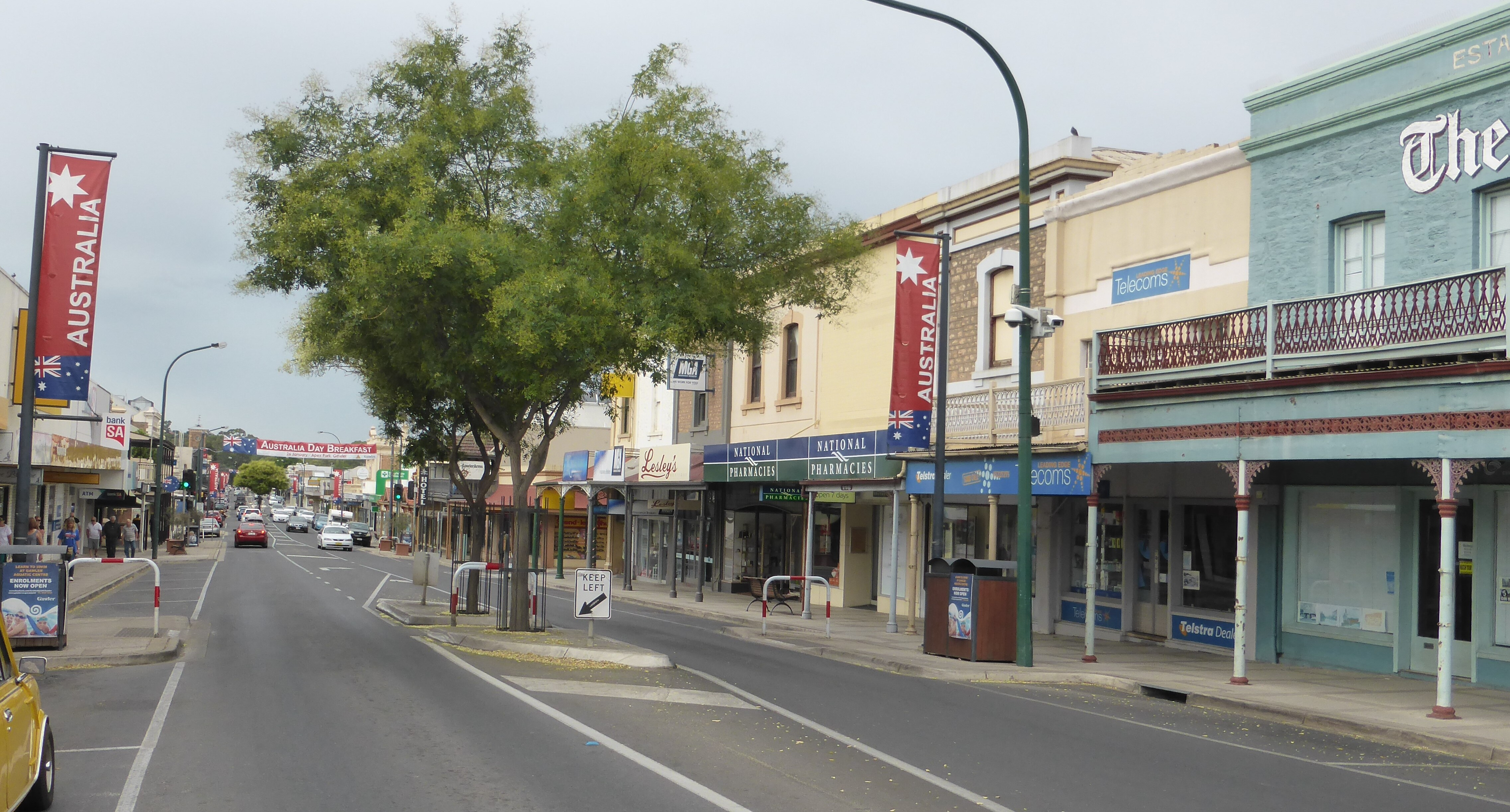
Modern-day Murray Street in Gawler, 2018

Gawler prospered early with the discovery of copper nearby at Kapunda and Burra, which resulted in Gawler becoming a resting stop to and from Adelaide. Later, it developed industries including flour milling by Hilfers & Co, and the engineering works of James Martin & Co manufactured agricultural machinery, mining and ore-processing machinery and smelters for the mines of Broken Hill and the Western Australian goldfields, and steam locomotives and rolling stock. May Brothers & Co. also manufactured mining and agricultural machinery.

With prosperity came a modest cultural flowering, ("The colonial Athens" was its nickname in the late 19th and early 20th centuries), the high point of which was the holding of a competition to compose an anthem for Australia in 1859, four decades before nationhood. The result was the Song Of Australia, written by Caroline Carleton to music by Carl Linger. This became, in the next century, a candidate in a national referendum to choose a new National Anthem for Australia to replace God Save the Queen.

Gawler had a horse street tram service from 1879 to 1931.

Historical population
| Year | Pop. | ±% |
|---|---|---|
| 1921 | 1,776 | — |
| 1933 | 1,676 | −5.6% |
| 1947 | 2,328 | +38.9% |
| 1954 | 2,473 | +6.2% |
| 1961 | 5,639 | +128.0% |
| 1966 | 6,645 | +17.8% |
| 1971 | 6,959 | +4.7% |
| 1976 | 8,596 | +23.5% |
| 1981 | 9,433 | +9.7% |
| 1986 | 11,354 | +20.4% |
| 1991 | 13,835 | +21.9% |
| 1996 | 15,484 | +11.9% |
| 2001 | 16,779 | +8.4% |
| 2006 | 20,006 | +19.2% |
| 2011 | 23,957 | +19.7% |
| 2016 | 26,472 | +10.5% |
| 2021 | 28,562 | +7.9% |
Source: Australian Bureau of Statistics data.

== Deadman's Pass ==
Boyle Travers Finniss recounts an incident during Colonial Light's travels before the Gawler survey. While camping at the Gawler river, they stumbled upon a deceased man buried upright and coated in clay. The tale circulating in Adelaide attributes the man's demise to a party led by Mr. Berhard. Allegedly, while travelling north with a dray, a distressed man emerged from the scrub west of the road and collapsed from hunger and thirst near the Gawler river ford. Despite efforts to save him, he succumbed shortly after encountering the party. They interred him in a tree and covered him in clay to protect his body from wild dogs, dubbing the tree "dead man's tree". The site, known as Deadman's Pass, lies at the southern end of Murray Street near the river.

== Culture ==
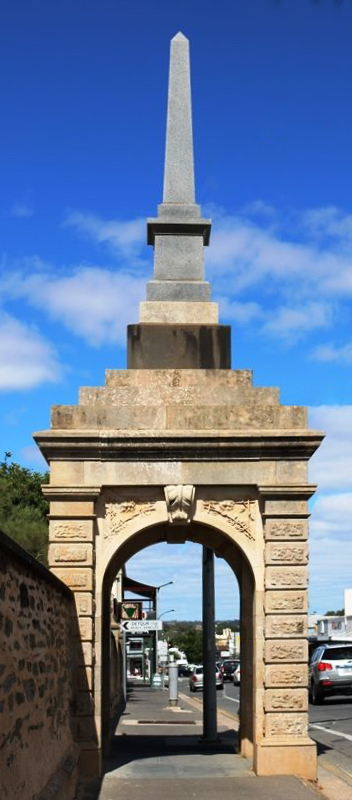
McKinlay Monument, Gawler

Gawler is a commercial centre for the Mid-North districts of South Australia.

Gawler regularly hosts stages of the annual cycling race, the Tour Down Under.

The annual show, named the Gawler Show, was established in 1856 and is South Australia's largest country show. Show attendances regularly attract an estimated 30,000 people over the weekend. The Gawler Show has won the Gawler Australia Day Award for Community Event of the Year in 2010 and 2017.

The Gawler Police XI (The Gawler Police are one of the oldest stations in Australia, as they have been on Cowan Street, Gawler continuously since 1842) play against a Salvation Army All-Stars team made up of local civic and business leaders in an annual community charity cricket match for the Hope Cup The 2022 Hope Cup match raised more than $40,000 to assist the homeless population in the community. The match is played at Curdnatta Park (Sandy Creek) which is considered one of the most picturesque cricket grounds in all of South Australia. The Bunyip Newspaper (The oldest regional newspaper in South Australia), awards the Bunyip Medal to the player in the game who best displays the spirit of the Hope Cup on and off the field. The Hope Cup Cricket Match won the Gawler Australia Day Award for Community Event of the Year in 2023 Australian cricket legend Darren Lehmann launched the 2nd Hope Cup at a formal dinner in August 2023 The Gawler Police XI won the Hope Cup in 2022 and retained it in 2023 The 2024 Hope Cup was launched by International Stars, Darcie Brown and Henry Olonga in June 2024. The All-Stars won in November 2024 with Federal Member for Spence Matt Burnell MP as part of the team the Cup was presented after the game by 2024 AFL Sir Douglas Nicholls Honoree Sonny Morey. The 2025 Hope Cup was launched by Cricket legend Ian Chappell while the South Australian Government Premiers Department invested a further $10,000 into the Hope Cup.

The Catholic Church in Gawler is dedicated to Saints Peter and Paul.

== Transport ==
A map of the TransAdelaide railway network.

Gawler is just over forty kilometres north of Adelaide city centre along Main North Road. Main North Road was the historic road to the Mid North region of South Australia. North of Gawler, the road is now known as the Horrocks Highway. The Sturt Highway runs northeast from the north side of Gawler, leading to Nuriootpa, the Riverland, Mildura and Sydney. The Barossa Valley Way runs east from the centre of Gawler into the Barossa Valley, and was the original route of the Sturt Highway. The Thiele Highway leads north between the Horrocks and Sturt Highways to Freeling, Kapunda and Morgan. The Northern Expressway is a new highway to the southwest providing a bypass of Gawler as part of the North–South Corridor, Adelaide which will eventually provide a non-stop road from south of Adelaide to Nuriootpa.

Gawler railway station was the terminus of the railway from Adelaide from 1857. The railway was extended to Kapunda in 1860. Gawler became a junction station when a branch was constructed into the Barossa Valley in 1911. This is the line that provides the Gawler Oval and Gawler Central (originally named North Gawler) railway stations in Gawler. Neither lines are now used beyond Gawler and Gawler Central is now the terminus of the metropolitan rail services from Adelaide.

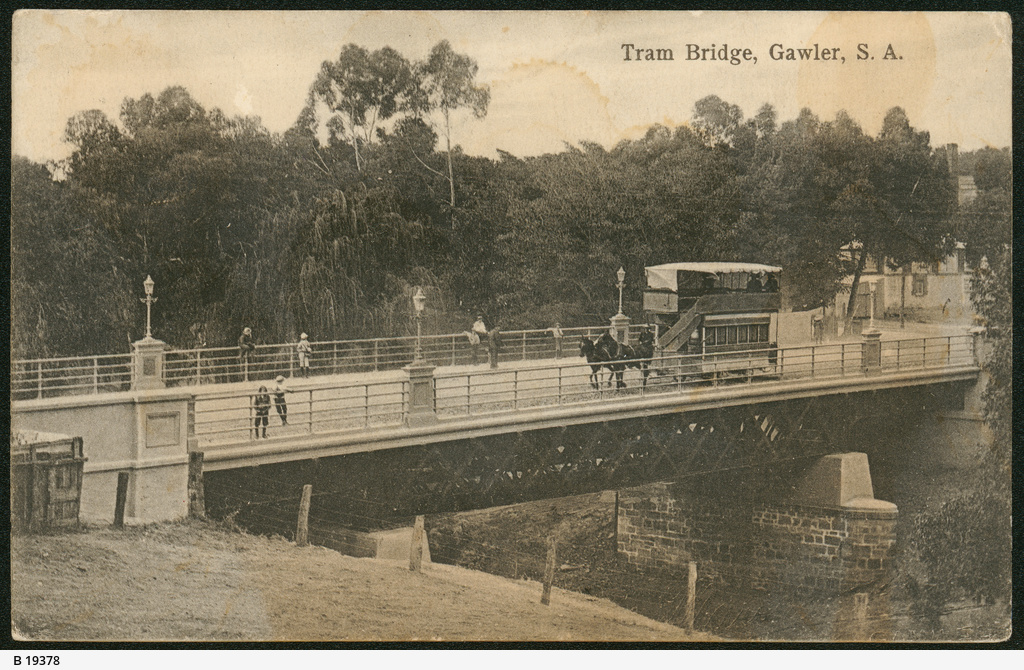
Horse Tram crossing the bridge in Gawler

Gawler's horse-drawn tram service opened in 1879. It operated for both goods and passengers from the railway station along what is now Nineteenth Street (then known as part of Murray Street) and Murray Street (the town's main street) to a terminus near where the Gawler Central station is now. It passed the James Martin & Co engineering factory, providing a convenient way to deliver heavy equipment such as locomotives manufactured there. Broad gauge locomotives were taken directly on the tramway, narrow gauge were transported on specially-built flat-bed trucks. There were also sidings at May Brothers and Company, Roedigers, and Dowson's Mill. The tram closed in 1931 replaced by a bus, and the tracks lifted soon after.

The tram route is now part of Adelaide Metro bus route number 491.

The Gawler aerodrome is an airport serving the town of Gawler. It was built in 1941 and was used as a Royal Australian Air Force (RAAF) base, before now becoming the home of the Adelaide Soaring Club and the Gawler Airfield Squadron of the Australian Air League.

== Racing ==
=== Gawler & Barossa Jockey Club ===
Horse racing began in Gawler in the 1840s, very early in the history of the town. A racecourse in the vicinity of Gawler South was soon established and the principal race of the state was held there in the latter part of the decade. It did not follow the circular layout that is almost universal in Australia but was straight: horses had to sprint to the end of the track, go around a post and race back to the winning post.

In the early 1880s, after a slump in racing, there was a revival and the present-day racecourse at Evanston was first used. The race club was inaugurated in 1883. In 1901, the racecourse was purchased for £1500.

During the Second World War, all race meetings were held in Adelaide, due mainly to a military camp being set up at Evanston.

Following some amalgamations with other clubs, the Gawler & Barossa Jockey Club was incorporated in 1971.

In 1992, the Controlling Body reduced the distribution of Totalisator Agency Board profits, which caused hardship to provincial and country clubs. In the late 1990s, the club was earmarked for closure; however, it persisted and it now describes itself as "progressive".

=== Greyhounds ===
The Gawler Greyhound Racing Club hold greyhound racing meetings at the Showgrounds on Nixon Terrace. The Club held its first meeting on 12 July 1971.

== Notable people ==
- Simon Birmingham, politician
- Jack Bobridge, Australian Olympic cycling silver medallist 2012 and 2016
- Peter Brinkworth, inventor of chicken salt
- Lachlan Brook, football player for Brentford F.C
- Wes Carr, 2008 Australian Idol winner
- Leslie Duncan, politician
- Bruce Eastick, politician
- Cecil Hincks, politician
- Jed Kurzel, singer-songwriter, and film composer
- Justin Kurzel, film director
- Brenton Langbein, violinist, conductor, and composer
- Darren Lehmann, Australian cricketer
- Lyn Lillecrapp, Paralympic swimmer
- James Martin, industrialist, politician
- Riley McGree, football player for Middlesbrough, Socceroos representative
- John McKinlay, explorer and pastoralist
- Sonny Morey, football player for Central District Football Club – SA Hall of Fame 2023, National Aboriginal and Torres Strait Islander Sports Award winner (1986) and SANFL Indigenous Team of the Century member.
- Lisa Ondieki (formerly Martin), long distance runner and Olympic silver medallist 1988 Marathon
- Angus Lippiatt, Glider pilot and activist. Well known for his local soaring accomplishments and activism for local users of the Gawler aerodrome.

== See also ==
- Town of Gawler (local government)
- List of locomotive builders (James Martin & Co)
