= Hundred of Nuriootpa =

Nuriootpa
- Cadastral division
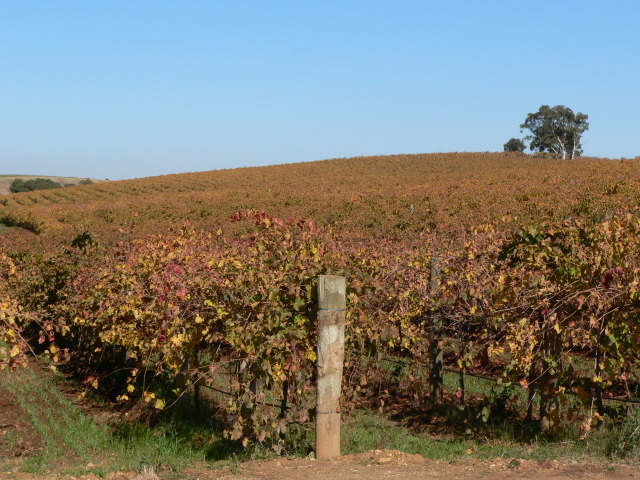
- Vineyards at Gomersal in the hundred's southeast

- Coordinates: 34.501°S 138.865°E
- Country: Australia
- State: South Australia
- Region: Adelaide Plains; Barossa Valley
- Established: 30 November 1847

Area
  - Total: 260 km^{2} (100.5 sq mi)
- County: Light
Lands administrative divisions around Nuriootpa
Mudla Wirra	Light	Belvidere
Mudla Wirra	Nuriootpa	Moorooroo
Munno Para	Barossa	Moorooroo; Barossa

The Hundred of Nuriootpa is a cadastral unit of hundred in the County of Light, South Australia split between in the eastern Adelaide Plains and western Barossa Valley. Named in 1847 for an indigenous term officially thought to mean "bartering place" and traditionally used as neutral ground for trading between various indigenous tribes, it is bounded on the south and east by the North Para River.

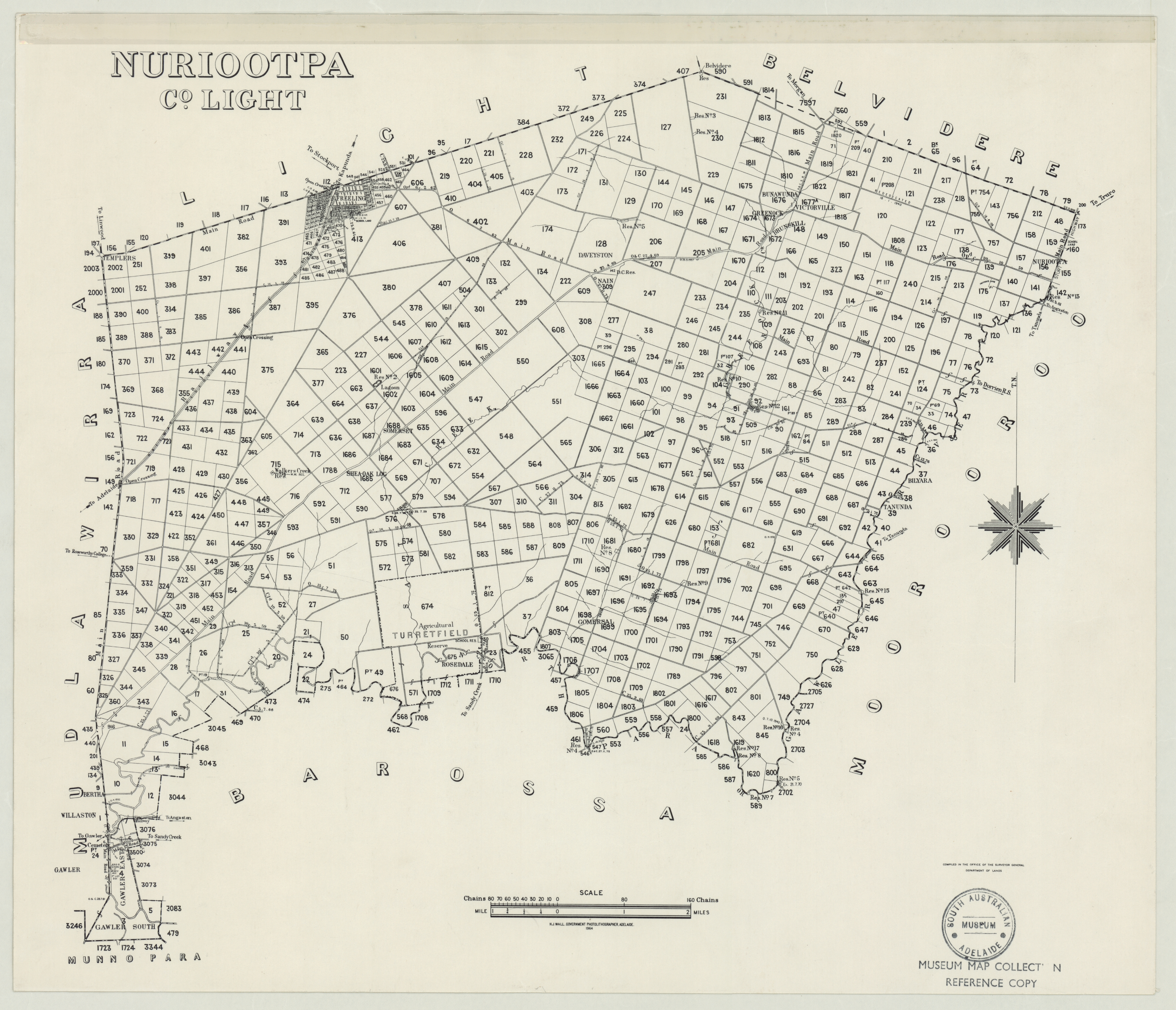
Plan of the Hundred of Nuriootpa in 1964 showing the principal population centre at Freeling on the north-western boundary

The town of Nuriootpa is at the north eastern corner of the hundred. Other towns within the hundred are Freeling, whose the southern and oldest parts straddle the north border of the hundred, and Greenock, also in the hundred's north. The localities of Nain, Kingsford, Shea-Oak Log, Daveyston, Seppeltsfield, Marananga, Stone Well and Gomersal as well as parts of Templers, Roseworthy, Concordia, Rosedale, Lyndoch, Rowland Flat and Tanunda are also within the hundred.

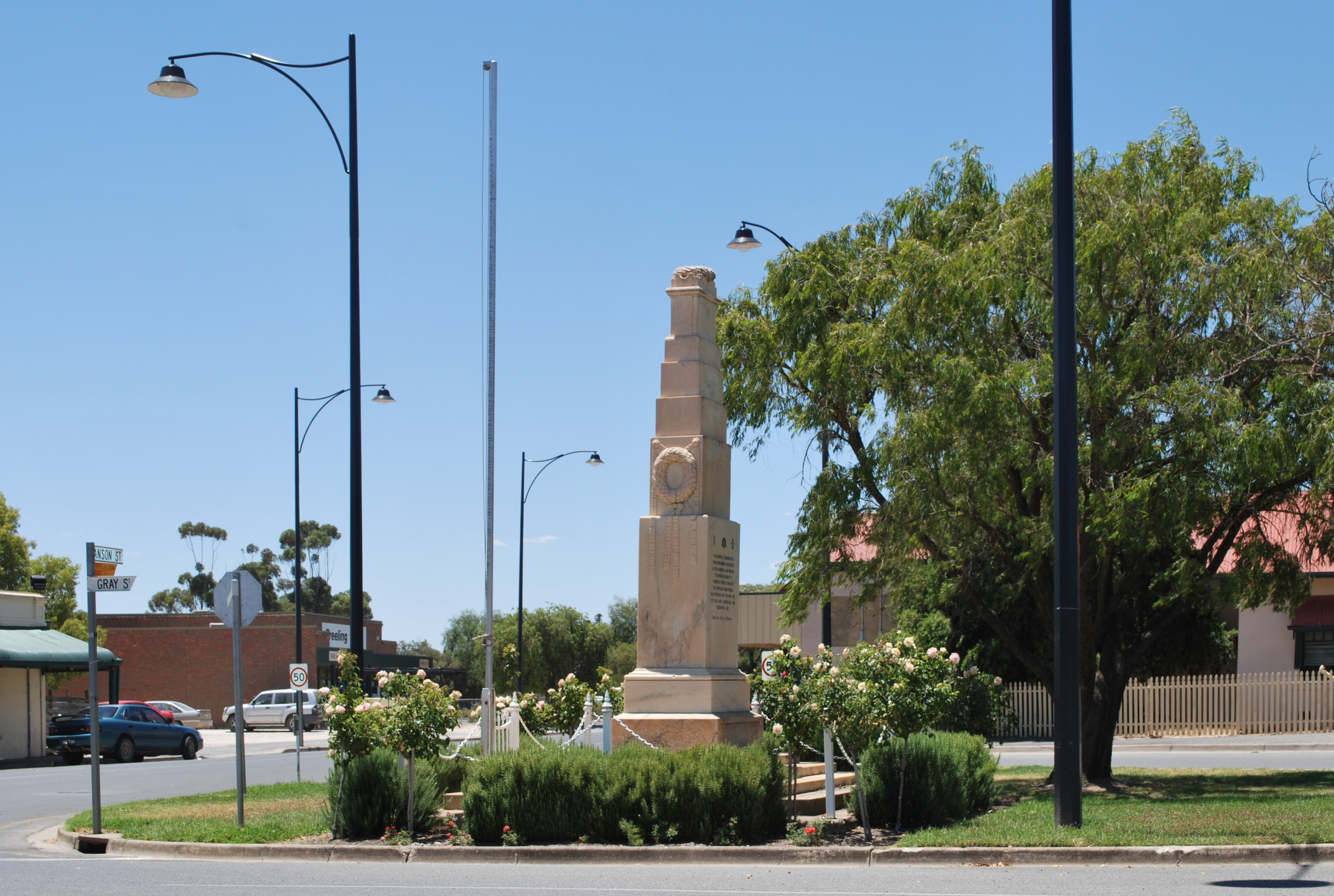
War memorial at Freeling on the northern border of the hundred

The hundred borders on the greater Adelaide conurbation with the Gawler suburb of Hewett and parts of the suburbs of Gawler East and Gawler South also lying within the hundred at the south-western corner near the North Para's confluence with the South Para River.

== Local government ==
Apart from the very small portion of land occupied by the Town of Gawler at the south-western corner of the hundred, the earliest local government in the hundred was established in 1867 with the establishment of the District Council of Nuriootpa, spanning the remainder of the hundred. In 1892 the Nuriootpa council annexed a portion of the District Council of Light to the north-west, bringing the township of Freeling (on the hundred's north border) under the governance of a single body. In 1910 the township of Nuriootpa in the hundred's north-east corner was annexed by the District Council of Angaston but the vast bulk of the hundred remained under the governance of the Nuriootpa council. In 1918 the Nuriootpa council changed its name to Freeling in line with the location of the council seat.

In 1977 Freeling and Mudla Wirra council (to the west) were amalgamated to form the new District Council of Light (the second of that name). In 1996 the Light council amalgamated with the District Council of Kapunda (to the north) to form the present-day Light Regional Council. The Nuriootpa township portion of the hundred at the north-east corner remained under the governance of Angaston council until 1996 when Angaston was amalgamated with Tanunda and the old Barossa district councils to form the present-day Barossa Council.

== See also ==
- Lands administrative divisions of South Australia
