= Hundred of Gilbert =

Gilbert
- Cadastral division
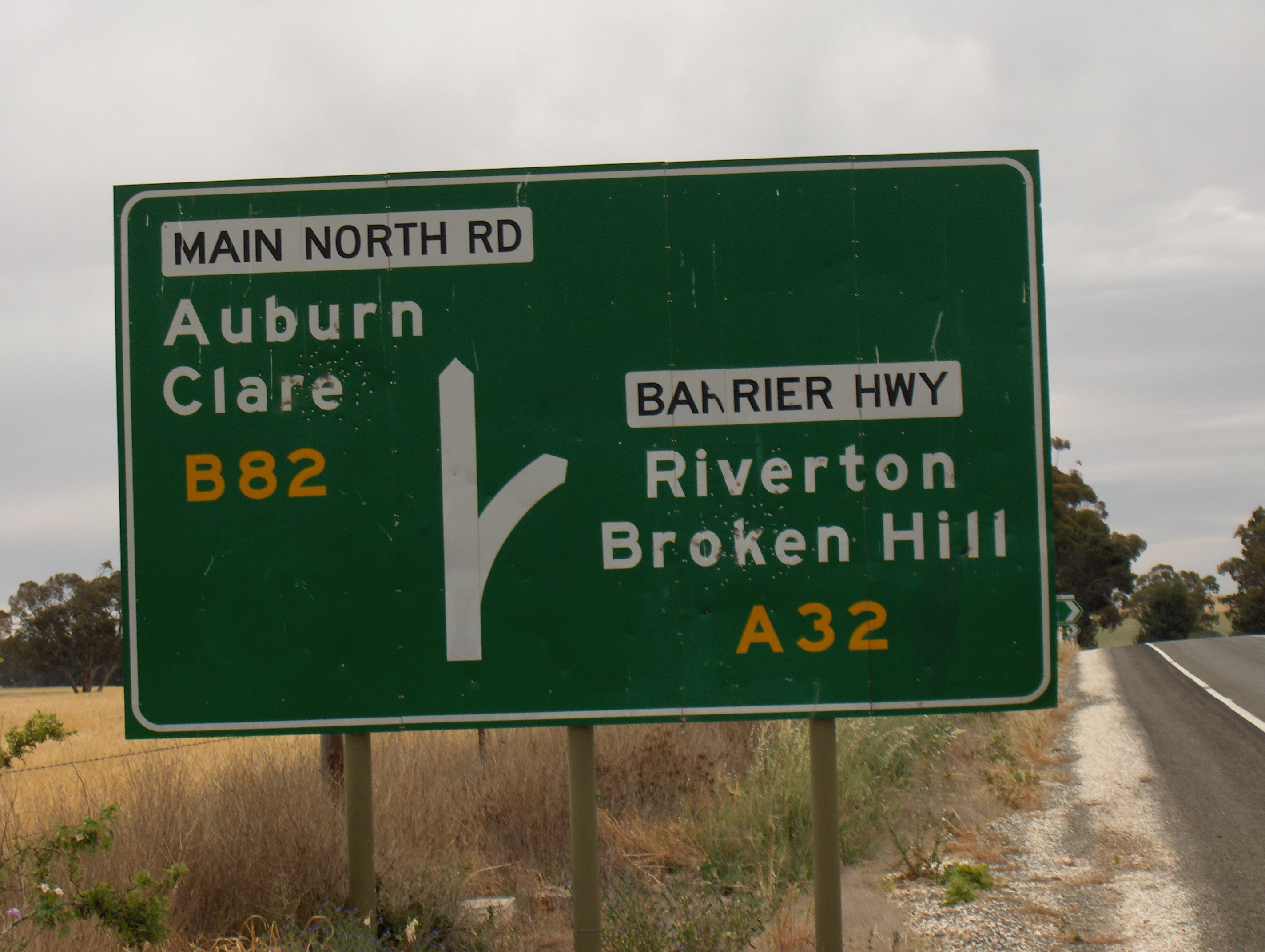
- Giles Corner, south of Riverton

- Coordinates: 34.20°S 138.79°E
- Country: Australia
- State: South Australia
- Established: 7 August 1851

Area
  - Total: 291 km^{2} (112.5 sq mi)
- County: Light
Lands administrative divisions around Gilbert
Upper Wakefield	Saddleworth	Waterloo
Alma	Gilbert	Waterloo
Alma	Light	Kapunda

The Hundred of Gilbert is a cadastral unit of hundred in the northern Mount Lofty Ranges including the town of Riverton. It is one of the nine hundreds of the County of Light. It was proclaimed in 1851 by Governor Henry Young and named after the Gilbert River, which flows from north to south through the hundred. The river, in turn, was named in honour of South Australian pioneer Thomas Gilbert.

Riverton, Marrabel (west half), Rhynie (part east of Horrocks Highway), Giles Corner (part) and Tarlee of the Clare and Gilbert Valleys council are situated inside (or largely inside) the bounds of the Hundred of Gilbert, as well as Hamilton (west of Marrabel Road) of the Light Regional Council.

== Local government ==
The District Council of Gilbert was established in 1866 with boundaries including all of the hundred except that part west of the contemporary Horrocks Highway, which was already governed by the District Council of Stockport.

In 1932 a small part of the council's south east was added to the District Council of Kapunda and the remainder was joined with the councils of Rhynie and Stockport to form the new District Council of Riverton.

From 1997 the District Council of Clare and Gilbert Valleys amalgamated the council of Riverton with the councils of Clare and Saddleworth & Auburn.

In 1996 the small south east portion of the hundred became part of the District Council of Light and Kapunda (later called Light Regional Council) by the amalgamation of the District Council of Light and the Kapunda council.

== See also ==
- Lands administrative divisions of South Australia
