= Hundred of Belvidere =

Belvidere South Australia
- Coordinates: 34.389°S 139.013°E
- Established: 7 August 1851
- LGA(s): Light Regional Council (since 1996); District Council of Kapunda (1932–1996); District Council of Belvidere (1866–1932)
- Region: Barossa Valley
- County: Light
Lands administrative divisions around Belvidere:
Kapunda	Julia Creek	Neales
Light	Belvidere	Dutton
Nuriootpa	Moorooroo	Jellicoe

The Hundred of Belvidere is a cadastral unit of hundred located in the north Barossa Valley of South Australia in the County of Light.

The lightly-populated localities central to the hundred are St Johns, Moppa, Koonunga, Ebenezer and St Kitts. The more populous towns of Kapunda, Greenock, Nuriootpa, Stockwell and Truro, and the localities of Bagot Well and Fords, also cross the boundaries of the hundred, but the townships are all outside the hundred bounds.

The name appears to be derived from the Belvidere Range, spanning from Nain, south-easterly adjacent to the hundred, to Black Springs, further north. The range was named by geologist explorer Johannes Menge in 1841 because of the view it commanded (Latin bellus meaning beautiful and videre meaning sight).

Plan of the Hundred of Belvidere in 1960 showing the Light River bounding the north west

== History ==
The hundred was proclaimed by Governor Henry Young in 1851, the northern boundary being defined as a line due west from Mount Rufus to the River Light.

The District Council of Belvidere was established in 1866 bringing dedicated local government administration to the hundred. There were no towns within the hundred then, as is presently the case, but a council chamber was erected at Koonunga and housed the council until the hundred was annexed by the District Council of Kapunda in 1932. When Kapunda amalgamated with the District Council of Light in 1996, the hundred came to be administered by the much larger Light Regional Council.
