= District Council of Light =

The District Council of Light may refer to one of four former local government areas in South Australia co-located with the River Light:

- District Council of Light (1867–1892)
- Adelaide Plains Council, initially named District Council of Light from 1935 to 1937
- District Council of Light (1977–1996)
- Light Regional Council (1996–present)
