= District Council of Stockport =

- Local government area
- Coordinates: 34°20′04″S 138°43′55″E
- Country: Australia
- State: South Australia
- Established: 1865
- Abolished: 1932
- Council seat: Stockport
LGAs around District Council of Stockport
| Dalkey; Alma Plains | Rhynie | Gilbert |
| Dalkey; Alma Plains | District Council of Stockport | Gilbert; Light |
| Grace | Mudla Wirra North; Light; Nuriootpa/Freeling | Light; Kapunda |

The District Council of Stockport was a local government area in South Australia seated at Stockport from 1865 to 1932.

== History ==
The council was proclaimed on 23 November 1865 and included land either side of the Gilbert River across the Hundred of Alma from Giles Corner in the north to the Gilbert's confluence with the River Light at Hamley Bridge in the south. The council area thus included south-western and north-western portions of the Hundred of Gilbert and Hundred of Light, respectively, as well as much of the Hundred of Alma. The inaugural councillors were John Lawrie, John Watts. Elisha Manuel, John Young, and Andrew Brakenridge.

On 12 May 1932 the council was amalgamated with the District Council of Gilbert to the north east and District Council of Rhynie to the north, to form the new District Council of Riverton.
