= District Council of Belvidere =

Former local government

District Council of Belvidere South Australia
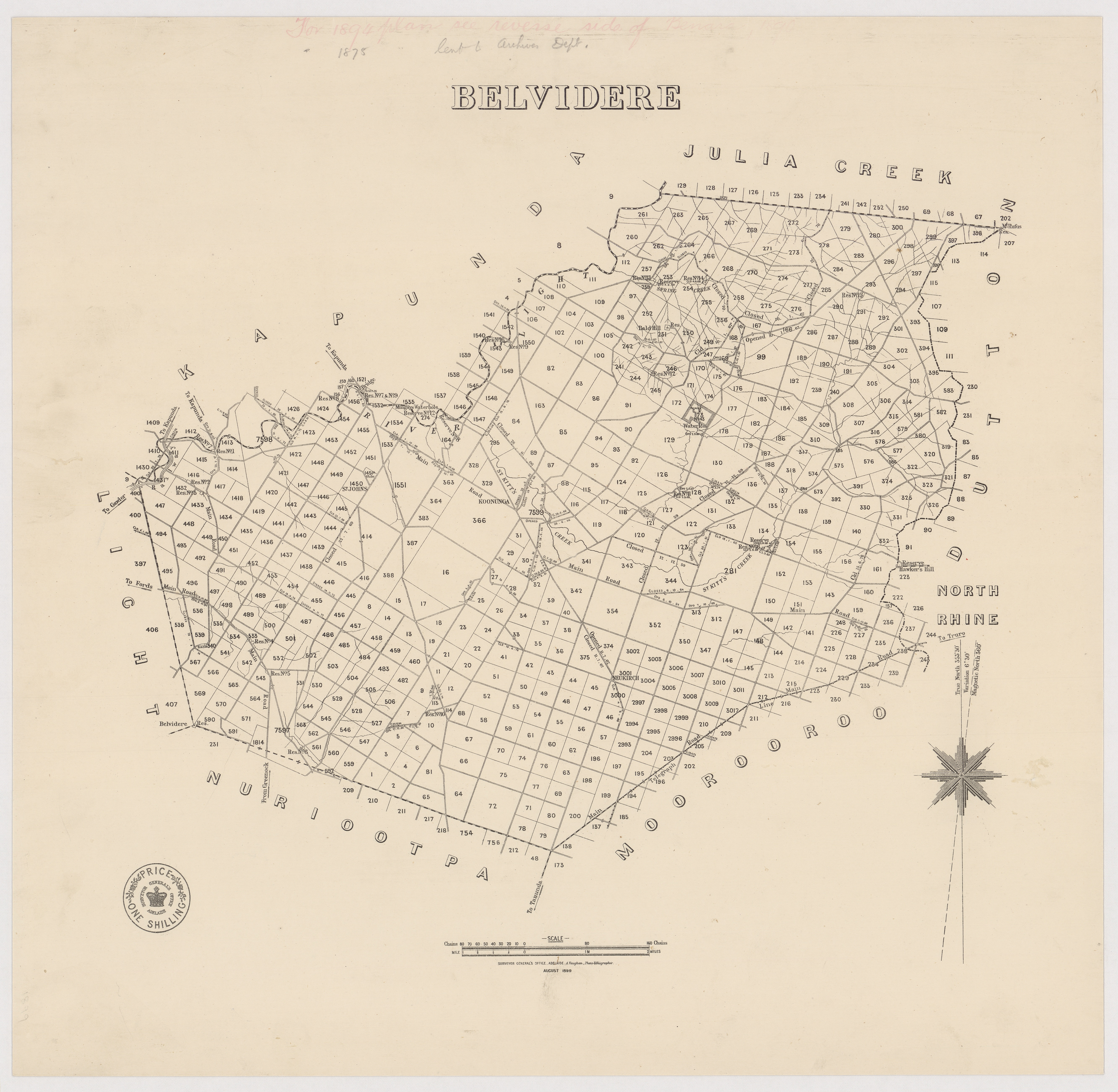
- Hundred of Belvidere 1899

- Coordinates: 34°24′S 139°01′E
- Established: 1866
- Abolished: 1932
- Council seat: Dimchurch (until 1875); Koonunga (from 1875)
LGAs around District Council of Belvidere:
Kapunda	Julia
Light	District Council of Belvidere	Truro
	Nuriootpa	Angaston

The District Council of Belvidere was a local government area in South Australia. It was created to provide local government in the Hundred of Belvidere on 13 December 1866 and combined into the District Council of Kapunda on 12 May 1932.

The boundaries of the district were defined by the boundaries of surrounding hundreds, but enclosed the Hundred of Belvidere. It was bounded by the Hundred of Nuriootpa, Hundred of Moorooroo, the County of Eyre, the Hundred of Julia Creek, River Light and Hundred of Light.

Messrs. James Macnamara, William Kickebush, William Flavel, David Fyfe, and Mungo Kerr were the first District Councillors for the District of Belvidere.

The settlement at Belvidere may have been a consequence of the opening of Belvidere Mine, a marble mine adjacent to a crossing of the River Light (now McCarthy Bridge) and was likely named Belvidere by association to either the Hundred of Belvidere, the land administration division on the south east side of the river crossing in which the main settlement lay, or the Belvidere Range which overlooks the mine and west of the hundred.
