= Kapunda (disambiguation) =

Kapunda is a town and locality in South Australia.

Kapunda may refer to:

== In South Australia ==
- District Council of Kapunda, former local government area in South Australia, merged to form Light Regional Council
- Hundred of Kapunda, a cadastral unit in South Australia
- Kapunda Football Club, an Australian rules football team in South Australia

== Ships ==
- Kapunda (ship), a sailing ship
- HMAS Kapunda, a Bathurst-class corvette

== See also ==
- Kapunda Island Conservation Park
- Kapunda Road Royal Commission
- The Kapunda Herald
