= Seppelt =

Seppelt is a German surname. Notable people with the surname include:

- Benno Seppelt (1846–1931), South Australian winemaker, son of Joseph
- Hajo Seppelt (born 1963), German journalist
- Joseph Ernst Seppelt (1813–1868), founder of Seppeltsfield and the Seppelt winery in South Australia
- Konrad Seppelt, (born 1944) German chemist, Vice President of the Free University of Berlin

== See also ==
- Seppeltsfield (disambiguation)
