= County of Light =

Light South Australia
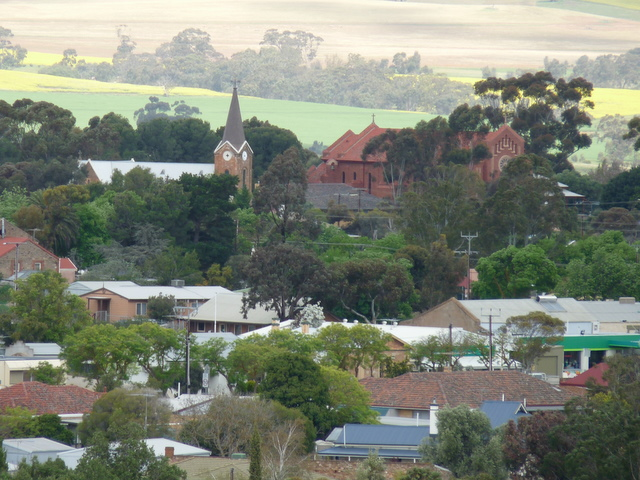
- View from Gundry's Hill over Kapunda in the Hundred of Kapunda

- Coordinates: 34.33°S 138.92°E
- Established: 1842
- Area: 2,173 km^{2} (839.0 sq mi)
- LGA(s): District Council of Clare and Gilbert Valleys; Light Regional Council; Barossa Council; Regional Council of Goyder
Lands administrative divisions around Light:
Stanley	Stanley	Burra
Gawler	Light	Eyre
Adelaide	Adelaide	Sturt

The County of Light is one of the 49 cadastral counties of South Australia. It was proclaimed by Governor George Grey in 1842 and named for the River Light, the river being named after Colonel William Light, the first Surveyor-General of South Australia. It covers the modern region of the Barossa Valley and a portion of the northern Mt Lofty Ranges. It is bounded by the upper Wakefield River in the north, the approximate path of Horrocks Highway in the west, and the North Para River in the south, and is bisected east to west by the River Light.

== Hundreds ==
The county is divided into hundreds as follows:

- North of the River Light are the Hundred of Saddleworth, Hundred of Gilbert, Hundred of Waterloo and Hundred of Kapunda;
- Spanning the River Light in the east is the Hundred of Julia Creek and in the west the Hundred of Light; and
- South of the River Light are the Hundred of Belvidere, Hundred of Nuriootpa, and Hundred of Moorooroo.

== Establishment of local government ==
The earliest local government in the county was brought about with the establishment of the District Council of Angaston in 1853, and the District Council of Tanunda in 1855, in the south-west Hundred of Moorooroo. By then the southernmost tip of the Hundred of Nuriootpa had been incorporated into the Town of Gawler, but it was not until the mid 1860s that further local government was established in the county.

In 1865 the Corporation of Kapunda was established in the Hundred of Kapunda, becoming a district council spanning the whole hundred in the following year. 1865 also saw the establishment of the District Council of Stockport spanning parts of the Hundred of Gilbert and Hundred of Light as well as the Hundred of Alma in the neighbouring County of Gawler. The District Council of Gilbert and District Council of Rhynie, established in 1866, brought local government to the remainder of the Hundred of Gilbert. The District Council of Belvidere, also established that year, brought the same to the Hundred of Belvidere.

In 1867 the District Council of Light and District Council of Nuriootpa (later called Freeling) were established to locally govern the Hundred of Light and Hundred of Nuriootpa, respectively. The following year, the District Council of Saddleworth, District Council of Waterloo and District Council of Hamilton were established to bring local governance to the Hundred of Saddleworth and Hundred of Waterloo.

The last part of the county to form a local government body was the Hundred of Julia Creek for which the District Council of Julia was established in 1874.

== See also ==
- Lands administrative divisions of South Australia
