= Peters Hill (South Australia) =

Hill in South Australia

- Location within South Australia

Highest point
- Elevation: 518 m (1,699 ft)
- Coordinates: 34°10′42.02″S 138°49′56.17″E

Geography
- Location: South Australia, Australia
- Parent range: Belvidere Range

Peters Hill, (518m), formerly Peter's Hill (the possessive apostrophe being officially deleted in December 1940) is the highest peak in the Belvidere Range of hills in South Australia, a northern extension of the Mount Lofty Ranges.

== Description ==
Peters Hill sits atop a north-south ridge about 7 kilometres (4.3 mi) west of the surveyed town of Hamilton and around 8 kilometres (5.0 mi) nearly due east of the town of Riverton. The surrounding country supports grazing on the higher peaks and dry grain farming on the slopes and plains.

== Naming ==
Peters Hill has been named as such since as early as 1842. It may have been named after William Peter, a Scottish grazier who in 1841 pioneered European settlement in this district. His sheep runs extended all round this hill, one of his head stations being nearby. "Peter's Hill" is shown on the western ridge of an 1842 plan of the Light River valley. "Mr Peter's Head Station" is shown on the eastern slopes of the valley. named on a survey plan drawn up in 1842 for the Secondary Towns Association.

Other history sources have suggested alternative origins for the name. Among these are the Manning Index. This identifies three sources for the hill's name. One is William Spence Peter, as already mentioned. Another asserts it was named after “Peter Inkster (c.1829-1917), an early settler.”, However, Inkster's obituary said that he did not migrate to South Australia until later, by which time the name had been in use for some time. Lastly, it may have been named "Petatz Hill" after Martin Petatz, a Wendish settler who owned a nearby property. However, Petatz’s name is not recorded in official records as a landholder. More likely, Petatz is simply a translated form of the name Peter.
