= Seppeltsfield =

Seppeltsfield may refer to:

- Seppeltsfield (wine), the winery in the Barossa Valley, South Australia
- Seppeltsfield, South Australia, the township in the Barossa Valley
