= Belvidere Range =

Mountain range of the Mount Lofty Ranges, South Australia

- Nain Range
- Location within South Australia

Geography
- Country: Australia
- State: South Australia
- Region: Northern Mount Lofty Ranges
- Range coordinates: 34°10′42″S 138°49′56″E

The Belvidere Range is a mountain range of the Northern Mount Lofty Ranges in South Australia.

The range was named in 1840 by early geologist/explorer Johannes Menge because he thought the highest point commanded a beautiful view (Latin Bellus meaning beautiful and videre meaning sight).

The range commences in the south at Nain and Greenock, where it is also known as the Nain Range, and rises almost exactly northwards to end near Black Springs.

The Hundred of Belvidere (proclaimed in 1851) and Belvidere Mine (a historic marble mine) south-east of Kapunda beside a crossing of the River Light, was likely named for the Belvidere Range which overlooks the mine and the west of the hundred.
