= Nuriootpa =

Nuriootpa may refer to:

- Nuriootpa, South Australia, a town and locality
- Hundred of Nuriootpa, a cadastral unit in South Australia
- District Council of Nuriootpa, a former local government area in South Australia - see Hundred of Nuriootpa
