= Hundred of Kapunda =

Kapunda
- Cadastral division
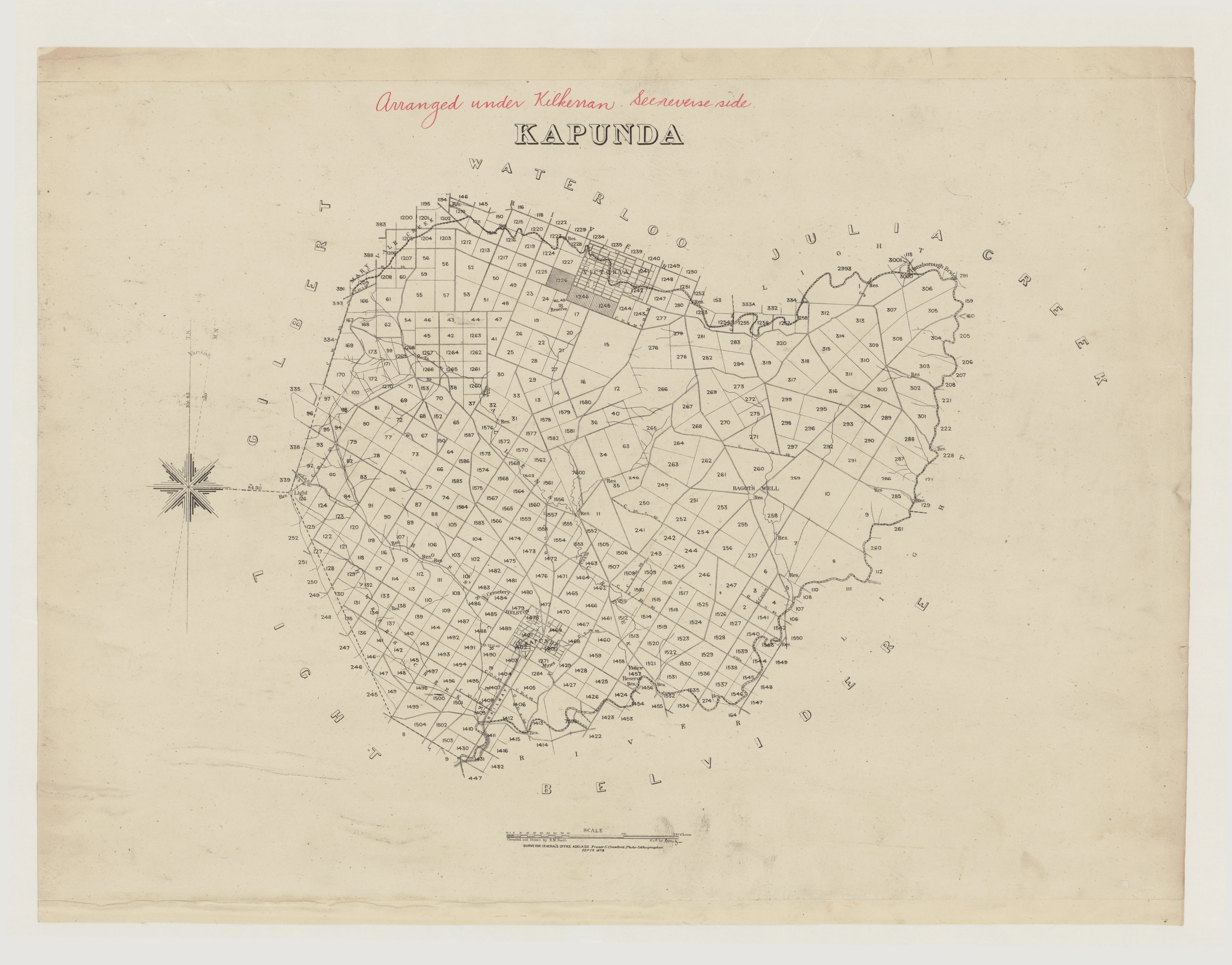
- Section map of Hundred of Kapunda in 1873

- Coordinates: 34.300°S 138.945°E
- Country: Australia
- State: South Australia
- Region: Mid North
- Established: 7 August 1851

Area
  - Total: 210 km^{2} (83 sq mi)
- County: Light
Lands administrative divisions around Kapunda
Gilbert	Waterloo	Julia Creek
Gilbert; Light	Kapunda	Julia Creek
Light	Belvidere	Belvidere

The Hundred of Kapunda is a cadastral unit of hundred in the County of Light, South Australia in the lower Mid North just north of the Barossa Valley. Named for the Kapunda copper mine in the 1850s which in turn is thought to have been a corruption of the indigenous word cappieoonda, referring to the spring which supplied water to the town. The hundred is bounded on the south by the River Light

The main town of the hundred, which also derives its name from the original copper mine, is Kapunda near the southern boundary of hundred. Other localities within the hundred are Hansborough, Bagot Well and Allendale North.

== Local government ==
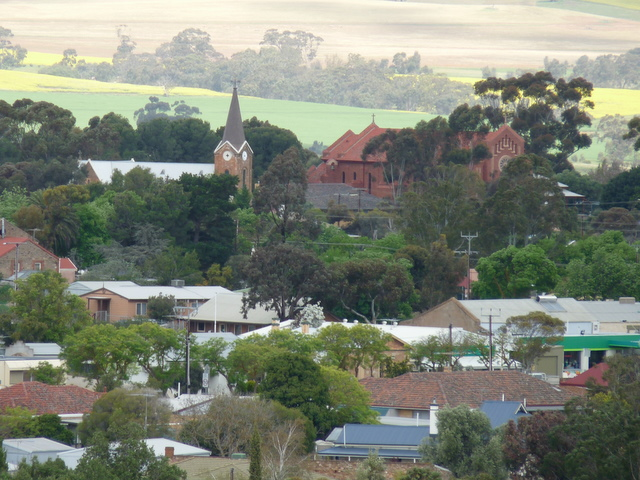
View from Gundry's Hill over Kapunda

The earliest local government started with the establishment of the Corporate Town of Kapunda in 1865. The District Council of Kapunda was formed the following year, bringing local governance to the remainder of the hundred. By the mid 1900s the council was a single entity and in 1996 it amalgamated with the District Council of Light to form the new District Council of Kapunda and Light, which was renamed Light Regional Council four years later.

== See also ==
- Lands administrative divisions of South Australia
