= Rosa Zelma Huppatz =

Australian nursing sister and army matron

Zelma Huppatz MBE
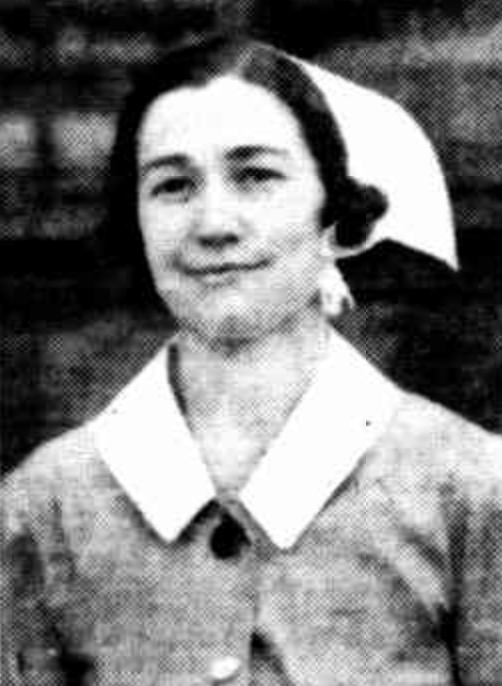
- Born: Rosa Zelma Huppatz; 20 July 1906; Peters Hill, South Australia
- Died: 13 December 1982 (aged 76); Adelaide, South Australia
- Occupations: nurse, matron
- Awards: Florence Nightingale Medal

Rosa Zelma Huppatz MBE (20 July 1906 – 13 December 1982), known as Zelma Huppatz, was a South Australian nurse and matron who served in the Middle East and Australia during World War II and then as matron of the Royal Adelaide Hospital.

== Early life and training ==
Huppatz was born on 20 July 1906 in Peters Hill, South Australia.

In 1930, Huppatz completed her surgical nursing training at the Adelaide Hospital with credit and passed her general nursing certificate the following year.

== Career ==
After six years as staff sister at the Royal Adelaide Hospital, Huppatz applied for overseas war service as a nurse. She joined the Australian Army Nursing Service as a sister on 14 February 1940, was promoted matron in June 1942, major in March 1943 and lieutenant colonel in 1945. She served in the Middle East from April 1940 to February 1942 and then at Katherine, Northern Territory from August 1943 to August 1944. Huppatz was discharged on 1 August 1946 and transferred to the Reserve of Officers.

In 1955, Huppatz was appointed matron of the Royal Adelaide Hospital, retiring in 1966.

== Awards and honours ==
In 1945, Huppatz was recommended for, but not awarded, the Royal Red Cross (RRC).

Huppatz was presented with the Florence Nightingale Medal by Lady Bastyan in Adelaide on 8 June 1963.

In the 1966 Queen's Birthday Honours, Huppatz was appointed a Member of the Order of the British Empire (MBE).

== Death and legacy ==
Huppatz died on 13 December 1982 in Royal Adelaide Hospital and was cremated. She never married.
