= Colonial store =

A Colonial store may be:

- Colonial goods, stores selling goods from colonies
- Colonial Store, term used in the colony of South Australia; Thomas Gilbert (pioneer) was the first Colonial Storekeeper
- Colonial Stores, a former U.S. grocery store chain
- Home and Colonial Stores, a former U.K. grocery store chain
