= District Council of Light (1867–1892) =

District Council of Light South Australia
- Coordinates: 34°23′10″S 138°48′27″E
- Established: 1867; 158 years ago
- Abolished: 1892; 133 years ago
- Council seat: Freeling
LGAs around District Council of Light:
Stockport	Gilbert	Kapunda
Mudla Wirra North	District Council of Light	Belvidere
Mudla Wirra South	Nuriootpa	Nuriootpa

The District Council of Light was a local government area in South Australia from 1867 to 1892.

== History ==
The council was proclaimed on 28 March 1867 and included most of the Hundred of Light, County of Light, with the exclusion of that part north-west of the Light River and the main road north, which was already locally governed by the District Council of Stockport. The only township of note within the council area was Freeling, straddling the southern boundary of the council area.

On 2 August 1892 the council was abolished and the council area was split between the District Council of Nuriootpa to the south and the District Council of Kapunda to the northeast, both of the latter having been established at a similar time to the Light council.

== See also ==
- Adelaide Plains Council
- District Council of Light (1977–1996)
