= Daveyston, South Australia =

Daveyston
- Town
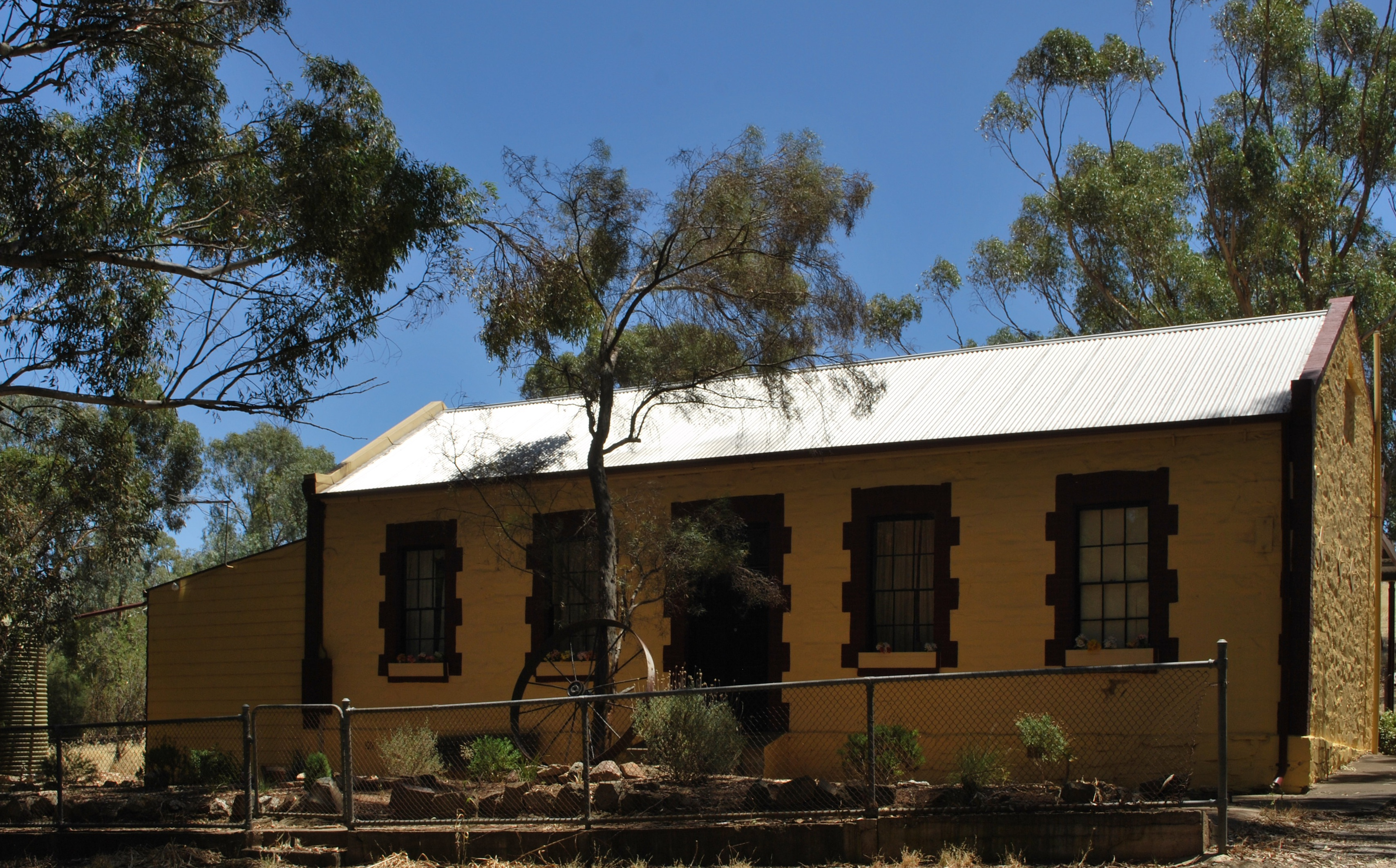
- A historic building in Daveyston

- Coordinates: 34.469°S 138.881°E
- Country: Australia
- State: South Australia
- LGA: Light Regional Council
- Location: 20 km (12 mi) NE of Gawler; 12 km (7.5 mi) W of Nuriootpa

Government
  - State electorate: Schubert
  - Federal division: Barker

Population
  - Total: 85 (SAL 2021)
- Postcode: 5355
Localities around Daveyston
| | Nain | Greenock |
| Freeling | Daveyston |
| Shea-Oak Log | | Seppeltsfield |

Daveyston is a small town in the northern Barossa Valley region of South Australia. It is adjacent to the current Sturt Highway which previously ran through the middle of the town. The town is named after Benjamin Davey who had established a mill there before the town was established.

There is a large stockfeed mill adjacent to the highway just west of the town, which is not the site of the original mill.

== History ==
The town was founded in the Hundred of Nuriootpa, by Edward Hempel, circa 1856, and named after Thomas Davey (1796-1862) who, with his five sons, established mills at Penrice, Angaston, Eudunda, Salisbury and Adelaide.

The towns first postmaster was Francis Norrie who opened a post office in 1863 and it closed on 3 January 1974.

The population of the town rose to about 100 in 1866 and, in 1877, the Daveyston School was conducted by Theodor Becker with 39 enrolled pupils; it opened in 1867 and closed in 1970.
