= Joseph Ernst Seppelt =

German-Australian viticulturist and merchant

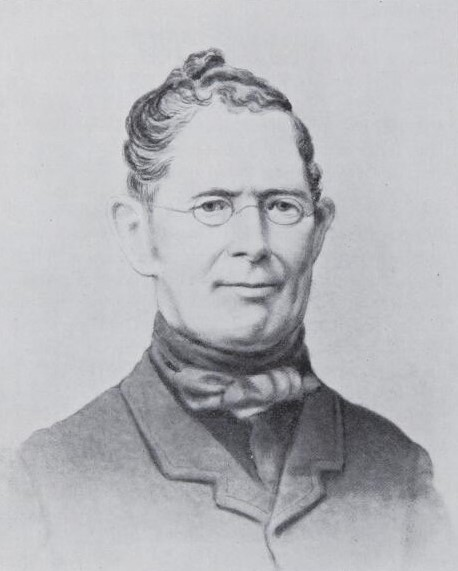

Joseph Ernst Seppelt (1813 – 29 January 1868) was a German-born Australian viticulturist and merchant who migrated to South Australia in 1849, and in 1851 settled in the Barossa Valley where he established Seppeltsfield, South Australia and the Seppelt winery.

== Life ==
Joseph was born in 1813 in Wüstewaltersdorf, Prussia, now known as Walim in Lower Silesia, Poland, his father had fought Napoleon's forces in Russia. After an education in music and arts, Seppelt toured Germany and Italy learning the aspects of tobacco, snuff and liqueur production in order to continue the family business. In 1849, when business declined due to political and economic unrest, he migrated to Australia from Silesia with his wife, Johanna Charlotte (Held), and their three children – Oscar, Hugo and Ottilie.

Through an agent in London, Seppelt managed to buy land in Adelaide, South Australia. After realising his tobacco was not growing, he moved to the Barossa Valley region in 1851 and purchased 64 hectares (158 acres) which he named Seppeltsfield. Here he grew wheat, farmed dairy cattle, and planted vines.

He made his first wine in 1867 in his wife's small dairy. His wine-making business expanded and he managed to sell a lot of his wine to buyers along the Murray River where it was transported via paddle steamer.

On 29 January 1868, he died suddenly of delirium tremens and was buried at Greenock, South Australia. He was survived by his wife and three children.

After his death, his son Oscar Benno Pedro Seppelt (1845–1931) known universally as Benno became manager and subsequently owner of the winery, and established B Seppelt & Sons Ltd in 1902. On Benno's retirement in 1916, his son Oscar Benno Seppelt (1873–1963) became managing director.
