= Stone Well, South Australia =

Stone Well South Australia
- Coordinates: 34.50°S 138.95°E
- Population: 110 (SAL 2021)
- Postcode(s): 5352
- LGA(s): Light Regional Council
- State electorate(s): Schubert
- Federal division(s): Barker
Localities around Stone Well:
		Nuriootpa
Marananga	Stone Well
		Tanunda

Stone Well is a settlement in South Australia. It is on the western side of the North Para River in the Barossa Valley. The current boundaries for the locality were established in May 1995 for the long-established name. The boundaries are the North Para River, Smyth Road, Stonewell Road and Seppeltsfield Road.
