= Marananga, South Australia =

Marananga South Australia
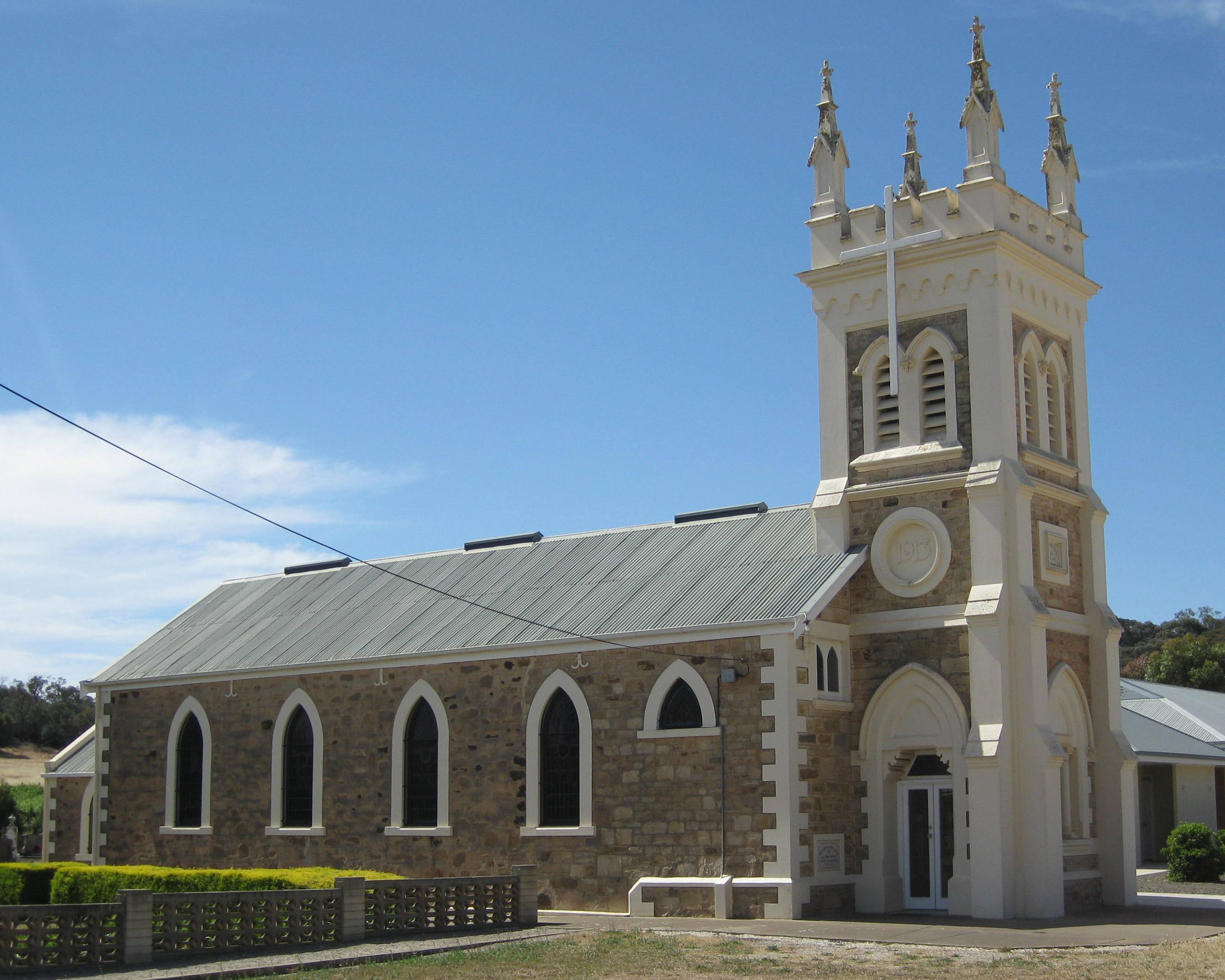
- St. Michael's Gnadenfrei Lutheran Church in Marananga

- Coordinates: 34°29′13″S 138°56′19″E
- Population: 104 (2016 census)
- LGA(s): Light Regional Council
- State electorate(s): Schubert
- Federal division(s): Barker
Suburbs around Marananga:
| | Greenock | Nuriootpa |
| Seppeltsfield | Marananga |
| Gomersal | Tanunda | Stone Well |

Marananga is a locality in South Australia. It was known as Gnadenfrei before 1918 when names of "enemy origin" were changed to sound less German.

The Gnadenfrei Lutheran Church was established, then a German school was established in 1879. The school's name was changed to Marananga in 1918, which is now also the name of the locality. Gnadenfrei means 'grace' and 'freedom'. Marananga means "My hands" in the Aboriginal language of the Overland Corner tribe.

== Tourism ==
Marananga is now viewed as an ideal tourism location within the Barossa, home to wineries, restaurants, accommodation venues, and even a gin distillery.

Wineries

- Greenock Creek Wines
- Two Hands Wines
- Tscharkes Place
- Heritage Wines

Distilleries

- Seppeltsfield Road Distillers

Restaurant/Eateries

- Bar Three 75
- Appellation

Accommodation

- The Louise, Barossa
- The Villas
