= District Council of Gilbert =

District Council of Gilbert South Australia
- Coordinates: 34°09′0″S 138°44′0″E
- Established: 5 July 1866
- Abolished: 12 May 1932
- Council seat: Riverton
LGAs around District Council of Gilbert:
Auburn	Saddleworth	Waterloo
Rhynie	Gilbert	Hamilton
Stockport	Light (1867–1892); Kapunda (1892–1932)	Kapunda

The District Council of Gilbert was a local government area seated at Riverton in South Australia from 1866 to 1932.

== History ==
The District Council of Gilbert was proclaimed on 5 July 1866. The inaugural councillors were Frederick Fleming, James Milne, James Kelly, James Shearer, and Edward Prescott.

On 12 May 1932, by promulgation of the Local Government Areas (Re-arrangement) Acts 1929 and 1931, Gilbert was amalgamated with the westerly-adjacent districts of Rhynie and Stockport to form the new District Council of Riverton.

== Chairmen ==
- Edward Prescott (1866–?)
- John McInerney (1927–1932)
