= Thomas Gilbert (pioneer) =

South Australian pioneer (1786–1873)

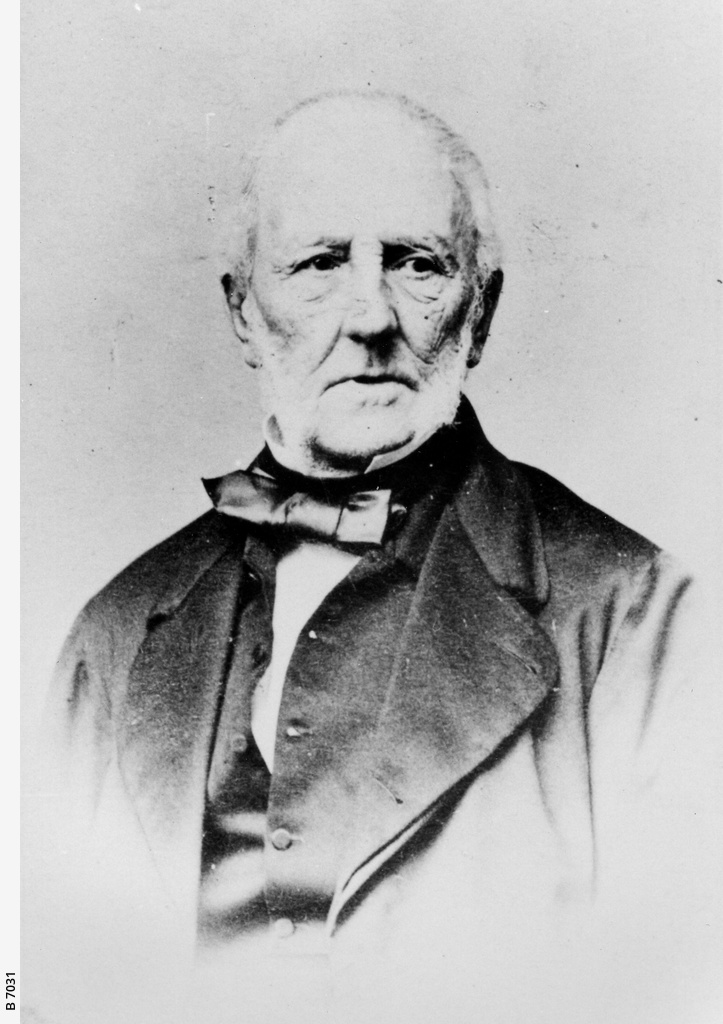
Thomas Gilbert, South Australian Pioneer & Mathematical Instrument Maker

Thomas Gilbert (1786–1873), a pioneer in South Australia, was its first Colonial Storekeeper (a government official responsible for all government stores) and its first Postmaster. He was also a fourth-generation mathematical instrument maker and optician in England, his family being highly regarded in this field at the time.

== Early life and instrument making ==
Thomas Gilbert was born in 1786 in The Tower Hamlets, Middlesex, England. He was the son of William Gilbert (1755–1819) and Anna Couchman.

The Gilbert family were highly regarded makers of mathematical, optical and philosophical instruments and were based in the Tower Hill area of London, England before becoming associated with Leadenhall Street in the City of London. Thomas' great grandfather, John Gilbert (1695–1749), was the first family member known to have worked in this field, and some of his work was presented to Isaac Newton and The Royal Society. Thomas was apprenticed to his father and worked as an instrument maker and optician in his father's businesses, variously known as Gilbert & Wright, Gilbert Wright & Hooke, Gilbert & Gilkerson, Gilbert & Co, Gilbert & Sons.

== W&T Gilbert partnership ==
After his father's death Thomas Gilbert partnered with his brother, William Dormer Gilbert (1781–1844) in their business W&T Gilbert, which operated from Leadenhall Street, City of London. William also had property in Woodford, Chigwell, Essex, where some of the larger work for their business was done. The brothers undertook extensive work for the East India Company. Their "experiments for the improvements of glasses were so extensive that the Government assisted them by a suspension of the Excise supervision, so that their large outlay should not be increased by the payment of duty".

In 1827 W&T Gilbert had been involved in a controversy regarding instruments made for the East India Company to use in the Bombay Observatory in India. John Curnin, the Observatory's astronomer, was highly critical of the Gilbert's work on the instruments and this resulted in a scandal and an investigation by the East India Company, after which Curnin was dismissed. Charles Dickens may have been inspired by this incident in Dombey and Son (1846–48), a novel featuring a Leadenhall Street instrument retailer.

After this incident in 1828 W&T Gilbert declared bankruptcy with debts of 12,000 Pounds. The bankruptcy case is considered important in British bankruptcy law, particularly in relation to fraudulent preference (of which the Gilberts were found not guilty).

== South Australian Association ==
In 1834 Thomas became involved with the South Australian Association in London before arriving in the colony of South Australia in 1836 to help establish the colony. In his obituary it is stated: "from March, 1834, to the time of his departure two years afterwards he devoted to it his entire time, and no small amount of money".

Many early South Australian settlers were those who had relinquished good positions in Britain to help establish "a model state which would not reproduce the inequalities of older countries".

== Colonial storekeeper ==
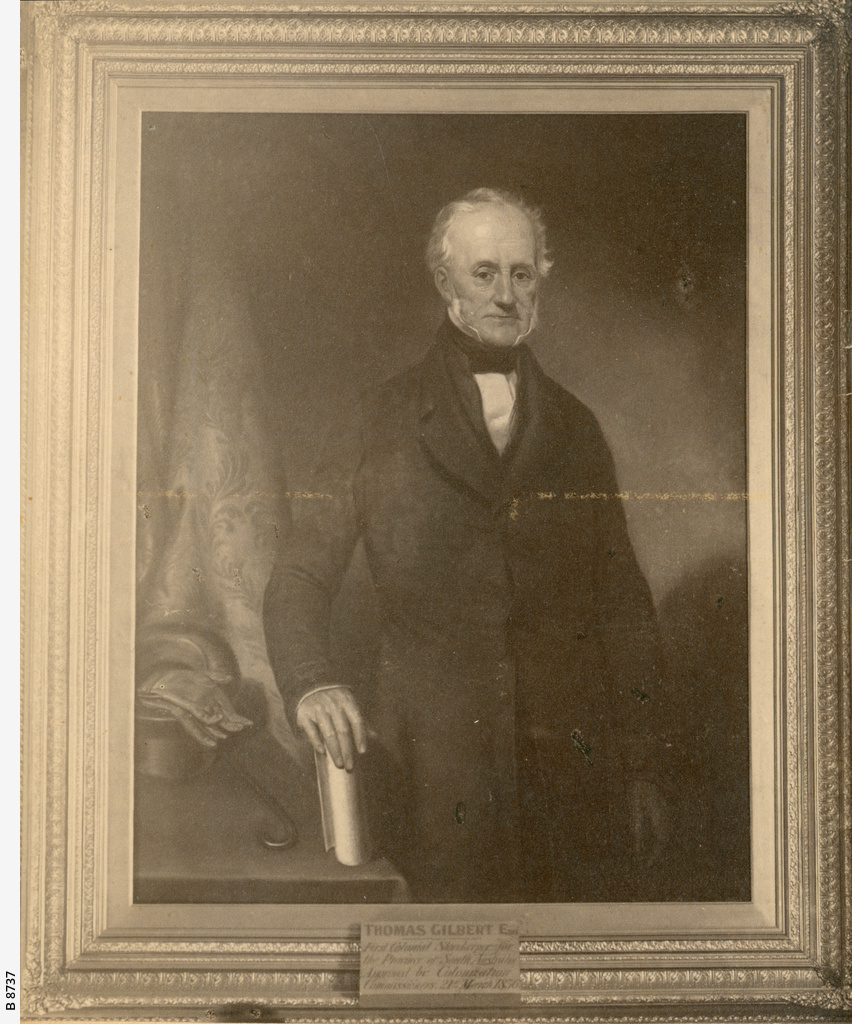
Painted portrait of Thomas Gilbert, South Australian Colonial Storekeeper

In London Gilbert had been appointed the task of operating the Colonial Storehouse by the South Australian Association formed by Robert Gouger. He arrived at Nepean Bay, Kangaroo Island, South Australia on 11 September 1836 with other first settlers and surveyors on the Cygnet, one of the ships in the "First Fleet of South Australia", before travelling on to the mainland to establish the Colonial Storehouse at Adelaide.

Gilbert attended the Proclamation of South Australia at Glenelg on 28 December 1836. He is said to have proclaimed the toast: "Mrs Hindmarsh and the Ladies" at the event.

Gilbert's storehouse, post office and residence, known as the Colonial Store, and the adjacent Iron Store, were the first European structures built on the Adelaide plains. These temporary huts were built on the banks of the River Torrens, on the present City of Adelaide Golf Links, just south of Strangways Terrace, North Adelaide. This was at the place known by the Kaurna people as Tininyawardli (or Tinninyawodli), near Piltawodli (the name later adopted for Park 1 of the Adelaide Park Lands). William Williams, who published wordlists of Kaurna words and also acted as a translator between the groups, was Deputy Colonial Storekeeper.

All manner of pioneering equipment, rations, hardware, and clothing were issued from this store to government parties such as builders, surveyors, police, and the Protector of Aborigines (William Wyatt). Also, to assist the pioneering population some items and rations were sold when there were general shortages. It was always expected that the Colonial Storekeeper position would eventually become redundant when settlement became so well developed as to support commercial suppliers to government, selected by a Supply and Tender Board answerable to a Commissioner of Public Works.

Thomas Gilbert retired as Colonial Storekeeper on 31 December 1854. He was replaced by John Vidal James (1820–97), son-in-law of Sir James Hurtle Fisher. Along with Thomas Lipson, the government granted him a lifetime pension.

== Postmaster ==
In addition to his normal duties, on 10 April 1837, shortly after the Proclamation of South Australia, Thomas Gilbert was appointed by Governor Hindmarsh as first Postmaster in South Australia, with the first post office being operated from his private residence. Thomas Gilbert was never officially given the title of Postmaster General and was granted a salary of thirty pounds per year for the Postmaster position.

He managed the post office for approximately fifteen months, at which point he lodged a grievance with the South Australian Government as he had not been paid for this role. The Government published an official censure on Gilbert and, as a result, he resigned the position of Postmaster effective 13 December 1838, but continued in his capacity as Colonial Storekeeper.

Officially, the General Post Office in Adelaide does not recognise Thomas Gilbert as the first Postmaster General and, instead, they have an oil painting of Charles Todd as their first Postmaster General.

== Civic activity ==
Gilbert was highly regarded among his fellow colonists, holding various official positions, including magistrate. He was a member of the Street Naming Committee and a founding member of the South Australian Literary and Scientific Association, which was first established in London in 1834. Gilbert was also a founding member of the South Australian Lodge of Friendship No. 613. He was elected and initiated into Freemasonry the first meeting of the Lodge which was held in 1834 at the South Australian Association in London. He later was elected Master of the Lodge of Friendship on 14 August 1838 and over the next years served a number of terms as its Master.

== Death and legacy ==
Thomas Gilbert died in Adelaide, South Australia on 30 May 1873 aged 87 years of age. He is buried in West Terrace Cemetery, Adelaide. On his gravestone is written "Erected by a few colonialists in token of their sincere admiration of his honorable and generous qualities as a public officer and faithful friend".

Gilbert Street in the city centre of Adelaide is named after Thomas Gilbert. The Gilbert Valley in mid-north South Australia, along with the river flowing through it (the Gilbert River) are also named after him, with the town of Riverton deriving its name from this same river.

The mathematical and optical instruments Thomas Gilbert was involved in making, along with those made by his brother, father and earlier ancestors, are highly collectable.

Thomas Gilbert did not marry and is not known to have any issue. William Barlow Gilbert (c. 1825 – 13 March 1893) who arrived in South Australia in 1847, aboard Phoebe, was a nephew and the son of Thomas Gilbert's brother and former business partner, William Dormer Gilbert. William Barlow Gilbert was a partner in the Adelaide Times and Weekly Despatch newspapers, and held various Government positions.
