= Seppeltsfield, South Australia =

Seppeltsfield South Australia
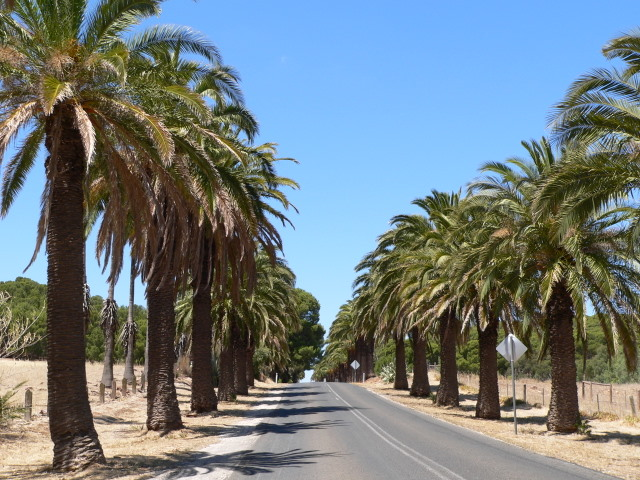
- The palm lined road to Seppeltsfield

- Coordinates: 34°29′27″S 138°54′50″E
- Population: 144 (SAL 2021)
- Established: 1852
- Postcode(s): 5355
- LGA(s): Light Regional Council
- State electorate(s): Schubert
- Federal division(s): Barker
Localities around Seppeltsfield:
	Greenock
Daveyston	Seppeltsfield	Marananga
Shea-Oak Log	Gomersal	Tanunda

Seppeltsfield is a locality in South Australia on the western side of the Barossa Valley. It is also the location of the historic Seppeltsfield winery. At the 2016 Australian census, Seppeltsfield had a population of 138.

Seppeltsfield was established in 1852 when Joseph Ernst Seppelt bought land and moved there after having migrated from Lower Silesia to South Australia in 1849. He attempted to grow tobacco, then grew corn, wheat and grapes.
