= Seppeltsfield (wine) =

Australian winery

Coordinates: 34°29′16″S 138°55′03″E

- Location: Seppeltsfield, South Australia, Australia
- Wine region: Barossa Valley
- Formerly: Seppelt (B Seppelt & Sons Ltd)
- Founded: 1851; 175 years ago
- Key people: Joseph Ernst Seppelt, Oscar Benno Pedro Seppelt, Oscar Benno Seppelt, James Godfrey (winemaker)
- Parent company: Seppeltsfield Estate Trust
- Known for: 100 Year Old Para Tawny
- Varietals: Shiraz, Cabernet Sauvignon, Mataro, Grenache
- Website: seppeltsfield.com.au

Seppeltsfield, one of Australia's oldest wineries, was founded in 1851 by Joseph Ernst Seppelt. The Seppeltsfield winery is well known for its signature wine, the 100-year-old Para Tawny.

== History ==
Joseph Ernest Seppelt, a merchant who sold such commodities as tobacco, snuff and liqueurs, emigrated with his family from Prussia to Australia in 1849 to break free from political and economic unrest. He was intent on growing and selling tobacco. In 1850, he and his family settled in Klemzig. After discovering that the land was not suited for such purpose, he and his family decided to settle in the Barossa Valley in 1851.

In 1851, Seppelt purchased 64 hectares (158 acres) of land for about £1 an acre which he called Seppeltsfield. He soon discovered that, as was the case in Klemzig, the land in the Barossa Valley was not suited for growing economically useful tobacco. However, the Seppelts did have success growing wheat on their land and, due to the gold rushes of the 1850s, were able to sell it for high prices due to high demand at the time. With his knowledge of liqueurs gained from his days as a merchant, Seppelt saw there was potential for wine production on his land. Soon thereafter, the Seppelts planted vines that flourished leading to a contribution to the Wines and Spirits category at the Melbourne Intercolonial Exhibition in 1866. By 1867, Joseph had begun construction of a full-scale winery, and by 1878, the port store cellar was completed. In 2006, the cellar held about 9 million litres (2.4 million US gallons) of fortified wine.

Joseph Seppelt did not live to see the completion of his winery, as he died in early 1868. His eldest son, Oscar Benno Pedro, then 21, inherited a 55% majority of the winery. Benno's younger siblings, Victor and Ottilie, inherited 30% and 15% of the winery respectively. Benno later bought out his younger siblings and gained complete control of the winery.

Benno's oversight helped earn the winery a reputation for quality wines. At the turn of the century, the Seppelt Winery was Australia's largest winery, producing 2 million litres (530 thousand US gallons) annually. The winery's reputation lead to statements like: "Seppeltsfield is undoubtedly the iconic winery of the Barossa".

== 100-year-old Para Tawny ==
In 1878, to celebrate the completion of the cellar, Benno selected a puncheon – a 500-litre (130 US gal) barrel – of his finest wine and declared that the barrel would be allowed to mature for 100 years. Thus was the idea of the "Seppelt Para 100 year old Tawny Port" born. Every year since 1878, the winery has set aside more of its finest wine for 100 years of barrel maturation. In 1978, the first bottles (750 ml or 25 US fl oz) of the 100-year-old wine were released. The Seppelt Para 100-year-old Tawny Port, then the Seppelt Para 100-year-old Tawny, and now the Seppeltsfield Para 100-year-old Tawny, has become the signature wine for the Seppelt, and subsequently Seppeltsfield, brand. Seppeltsfield is the only winery to have notable amounts of wine set aside in consecutive vintages for over 100 years, and nowhere else in the world does a winery annually release a commercially available wine a century old. In 2009, the wine was priced at $1,000 per half bottle (375 ml or 12.7 US fl oz). Originally released in 750 ml (25 US fl oz) bottles and 375 ml (12.7 US fl oz) half bottles, the wine is now available "in 375 ml (12.7 US fl oz) and 100 ml (3.4 US fl oz) formats".

== Tonic wines ==
Seppelts produced several wines promoted for their supposed health-giving properties. "Invalid port" and "Hospital brandy" were choice quality wines sold in small quantities and frequently prescribed by doctors in the 19th and early 20th centuries. Specialties were "Quinine champagne" and "Sedna". The latter was a port wine containing extract of beef, kola nut and coca leaf, produced by Deans, Logan & Co. of Belfast, Ireland, and marketed by Seppelts from around 1908. It may later have been produced under licence by Seppelts. Later formulations had kola nut powder as the only advertised additive, the meat extract and coca having been dropped in 1923.

== Winery ownership ==
Benno and his wife had a total of 16 children. In 1902, Benno set up "B Seppelt & Sons Ltd", and on his retirement in 1916, their eldest surviving son, Oscar (Oscar Benno Seppelt,) became managing director. After Benno's death in 1931, many of their children took interests in the company.

The company (and winery) remained in the Seppelt family until 1984 when it became the subject of a share market struggle for its control, and subsequent takeover by SA Brewing Holdings in 1985. Meanwhile, Tooth & Co., part of the Adelaide Steamship Group, purchased a number of wineries. AdSteam sold its wineries to SA Brewing Holdings in 1990, which named all of its wine holdings "The Penfolds Wines Group", and then, in 1994, Southcorp Wines.

In 2005, ownership changed hands again when the Foster's Group purchased Southcorp Wines. In 2006, it was expected that about 300,000 people would visit Seppeltsfield annually.

In 2007, ownership of the winery changed again when the Seppeltsfield Estate Trust, (Nathan Waks (managing director) and Bruce Baudinet (chairman), who were also behind the Clare Valley winery, Kilikanoon), purchased Seppelts from the Foster's Group, and started using the Seppeltsfield name on wine labels.

On 5 March 2013, then managing director, Warren Randall, became majority shareholder, acquiring over 90% of the shares.

== JamFactory ==
In 2013, the arts and crafts organisation, JamFactory, opened its regional extension on the Seppeltsfield estate, including studios, gallery and shop. The shop sells an extensive range of hand-crafted ceramics, furniture, glassware, jewellery and other items.

== See also ==
- Australian wine
- Cult wine
- South Australian food and drink
- List of wineries in the Barossa Valley
