= Nain, South Australia =

Nain
- Town
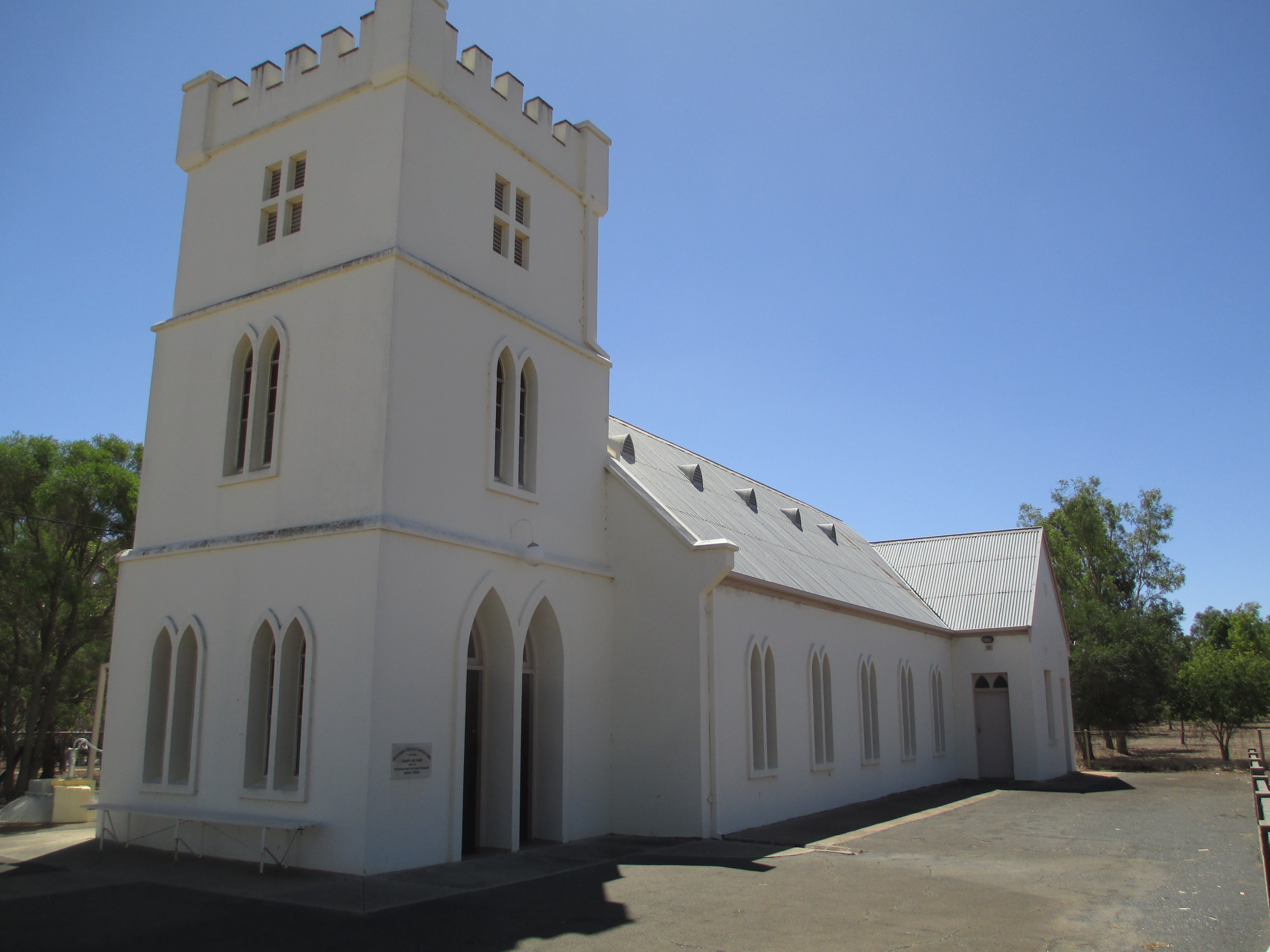
- Nain Lutheran Church in 2015

- Coordinates: 34.4497°S 138.9004°E
- Country: Australia
- State: South Australia
- LGA: Light Regional Council
- Location: 2 km (1.2 mi) W of Greenock
- Established: 1854

Government
  - State electorate: Schubert
  - Federal division: Barker

Population
  - Total: 32 (SAL 2021)
- Postcode: 5360
Localities around Nain
	Fords	Moppa
Freeling	Nain	Greenock
	Daveyston

Nain is a settlement west of Greenock in the northern Barossa Valley region of South Australia. It was first settled in the 1850s, mostly by German settlers moving from the Mount Barker area. The Nain "Zum Schmalen Wege" church operated from 1861 to 1893, and the present Nain church opened in 1856. Both have cemeteries.
