= Gilbert River (South Australia) =

River in South Australia

Gilbert
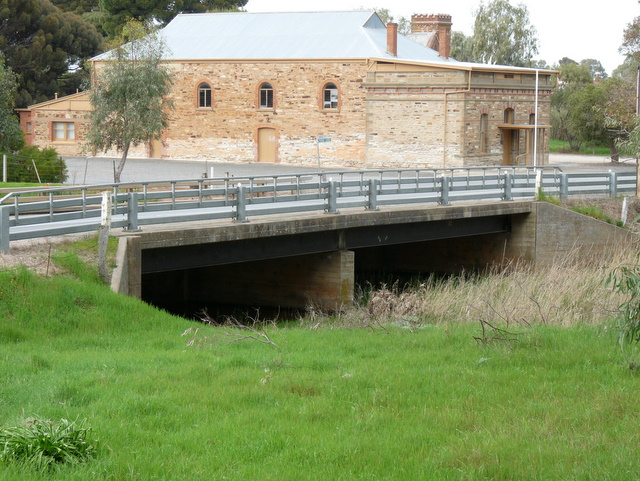
- Bridge over the Gilbert River at Saddleworth

- Location of the river mouth in South Australia
- Etymology: Thomas Gilbert

Location
- Country: Australia
- State: South Australia
- Region: Mid North

Physical characteristics
- Source: Barossa Ranges
  - location: near Manoora
  - elevation: 399 m (1,309 ft)
- Mouth: confluence with the Light River
  - location: near Hamley Bridge
  - coordinates: 34°21′S 138°40′E
  - elevation: 93 m (305 ft)
- Length: 59 km (37 mi)

Basin features
- River system: Light River

The Gilbert River is a river in the Mid North region of South Australia.

== Course and features ==
The Gilbert River rises near Manoora, on the Barrier Highway and flows generally south, as a broad and shallow valley through mainly undulating country, flowing through Saddleworth, Riverton, Tarlee then southwest through Stockport and Hamley Bridge. The Gilbert reaches its confluence with the Light River just downstream from Hamley Bridge. The Light River continues west to Gulf St Vincent. The Gilbert descends 306 metres (1,004 ft) over its 59-kilometre (37 mi) course.

Characteristic with many Mid North streams, the Gilbert can entirely cease flowing in summer, yet be a swirling and dangerous torrent after flooding rains. Grain cropping and grazing are carried out along its banks, which are mainly low and open.

== History ==
The river lies within the traditional lands of the indigenous Ngadjuri people, but their name for the river is unknown. The explorer John Hill came to it in early April 1839, and named it after Colonial storekeeper, Thomas Gilbert, who was responsible for all government stores. The first written mention of the river is by explorer Edward John Eyre. When he crossed the river in May 1839 on his northern expedition he acknowledged it was already named the Gilbert. The river was a source of fresh water for the settlements that soon followed, scattered along its banks.

== Bridges ==
The earliest pioneers were obliged to ford the river, but following the founding of the Burra mines in 1846 the Great North Road (later named the Main North Road) between Adelaide and Gawler was extended to Burra. This took over a decade to construct and included the first bridges over the Gilbert, most being built in the early to mid 1850s.

== See also ==
- List of rivers of Australia § South Australia
