= Greenock, South Australia =

Greenock South Australia
- Coordinates: 34°27′28″S 138°55′39″E
- Population: 1,087 (2016 census)
- Established: 1851
- Postcode(s): 5360
- Location: 66.2 km (41 mi) North of Adelaide
- LGA(s): Light Regional Council
- State electorate(s): Schubert, Light, Stuart
- Federal division(s): Barker
Localities around Greenock:
Fords	Moppa	Ebenezer
Nain	Greenock	Nuriootpa
Daveyston	Seppeltsfield	Marananga

Greenock is a small town on the north-west edge of the Barossa Valley. Located 66 km from Adelaide on the Sturt Highway (A20), Greenock is characterised by tree-lined streets with shady peppercorn trees which offer welcome relief from the hot summers which are characteristic of the area.

The town was named by James Smith, the secretary of George Fife Angas, after Greenock on the River Clyde in Scotland and is sometimes called Little Scotland in the Barossa Valley. The town is also located on the famous Heysen Trail.

== Residents ==
According to the 2016 Census the population of the Greenock census area was 1087 people. Of these 51.8% were male and Aboriginal and/or Torres Strait Islander people made up 0.7% of the population. The median age of people in Greenock was 40 years and 84.4% were Australian born. The median weekly household income is A$1,568 per week, compared with $1,026 for South Australia overall. 35.7% of the population identify themselves as having no religion, while 25.7% identify as Lutheran.
