= District Council of Kapunda =

- Local government area
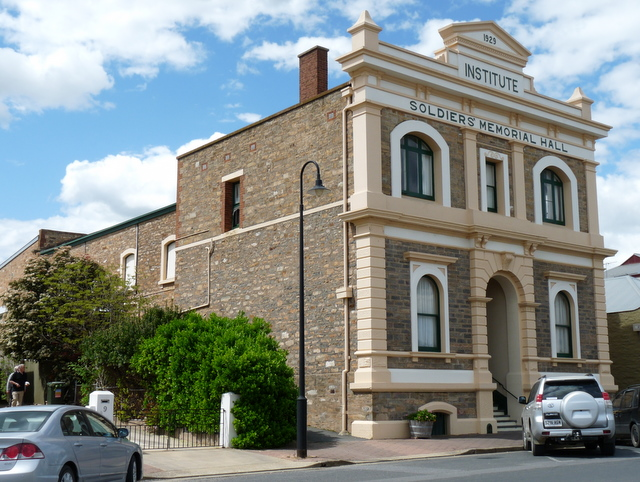
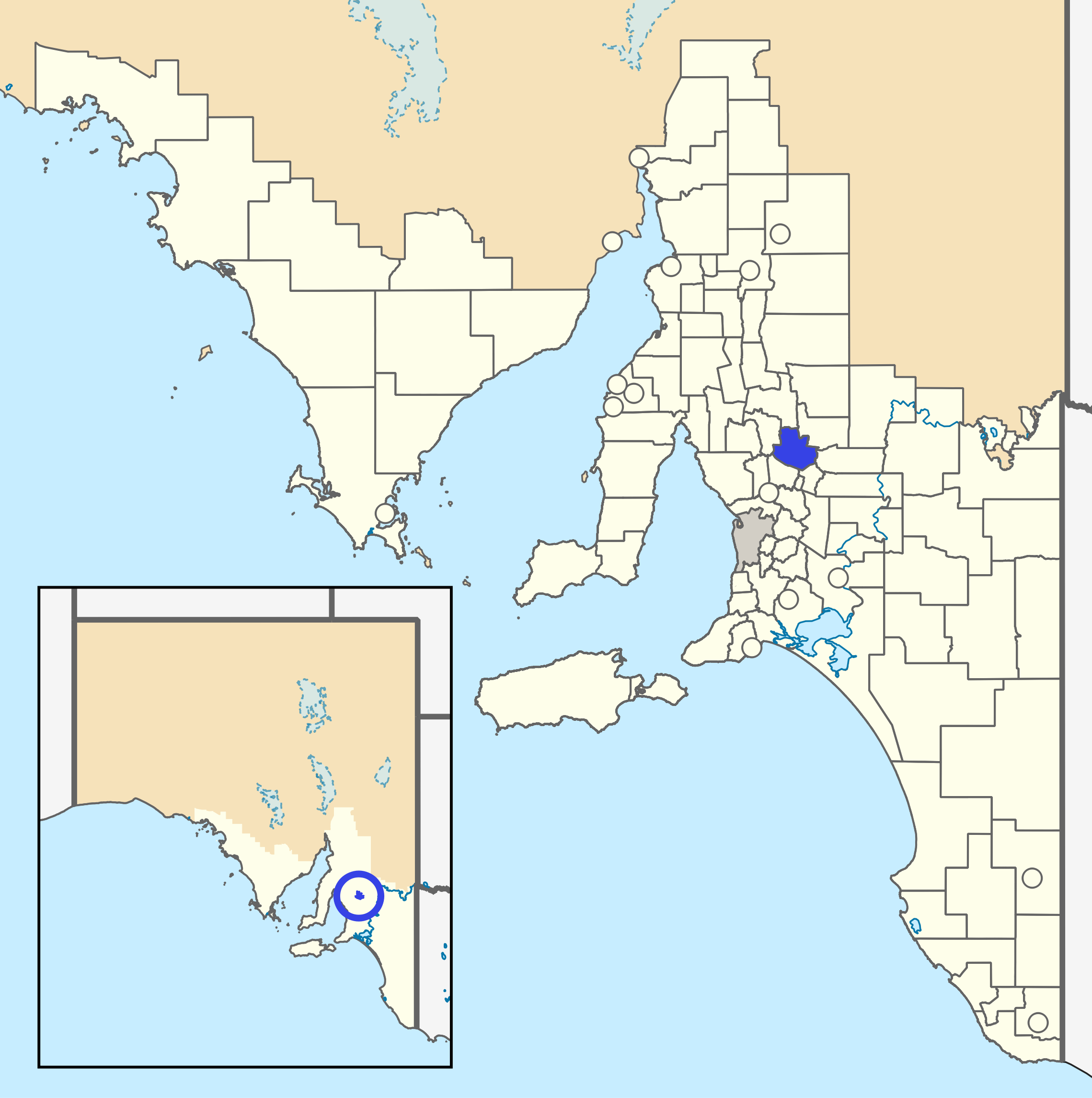
- Kapunda Institute The District Council of Kapunda as it was prior to disestablishment (blue)
- Coordinates: 34°20′20″S 138°55′00″E
- Country: Australia
- State: South Australia
- Established: 5 July 1866
- Abolished: 1 March 1996
- Council seat: Kapunda

Area (1936)
  - Total: 27,683 ha (68,406 acres)
LGAs around District Council of Kapunda
Gilbert (1866–1932); Riverton (1932-1996)	Hamilton (1868–1932); Riverton (1932-1996)	Julia (1874–1932); Eudunda (1932–1996)
Freeling (1867–1977); Light (1977–1996)	Kapunda	Julia (1874–1932); Truro (1932–1991); Ridley-Truro (1991–1996)
Freeling (1867–1977); Light (1977–1996)	Belvidere (1866–1932); Angaston (1932–1996)	Belvidere (1866–1932); Angaston (1932–1996)

The District Council of Kapunda was a local government area in South Australia from 1866 to 1996. The Kapunda town corporation was formed a year earlier in 1865 and ultimately amalgamated into the district council.

== History ==
The Corporate Town of Kapunda was proclaimed on 13 July 1865. The inaugural mayor was Matthew Blood and councillors were John Mullen, Richard Rowett, Richard Day, James Crase, Joseph Tuckfield, Stephen Bennett, James Pearce and William Lewis.

The following year on 5 July 1866 the District Council of Kapunda was established immediately north of the corporate town boundaries, bringing local governance to the remainder of the Hundred of Kapunda. The inaugural district councillors were John Ford, William Oldham, Thomas Duell, James Stokes, and Henry Kelly.

On 12 May 1932, by promulgation of the Local Government Areas (Re-arrangement) Acts 1929 and 1931, Kapunda annexed the south-easterly adjacent District Council of Belvidere as well as parts of the northerly adjacent District Council of Gilbert and District Council of Hamilton, more than doubling the council area. By 1936 the Kapunda district spanned 67,840 acres (27,450 ha) while the corporate township occupied 566 acres (229 ha).

On 1 March 1996 the council was abolished when Kapunda and Light councils were amalgamated to form the new District Council of Kapunda and Light.
