= District Council of Light (1977–1996) =

District Council of Light South Australia
- Coordinates: 33.8380°S 138.9713°E
- Population: 5,500 (1986)
  - Density: 8.31/km^{2} (21.52/sq mi)
- Established: 1977
- Abolished: 1996
- Area: 662 km^{2} (255.6 sq mi)(1986)
- Council seat: Freeling
- State electorate(s): Light
LGAs around District Council of Light:
| Owen (1977–1983); Wakefield Plains (1983–1996) | Riverton | Kapunda |
| Mallala | Light | Kapunda |
| Munno Para | Barossa | Angaston; Tanunda |

The District Council of Light was a local government area in South Australia from 1977 to 1996, seated at Freeling.

== History ==
The council was proclaimed on 1 March 1977 by the amalgamation of the District Council of Freeling and the District Council of Mudla Wirra. From 1 July 1977, it consisted of eight councillors, one representing each ward (Freeling, Gawler River, Greenock, Light, Para, Pinkerton, Roseworthy and Wasleys). As of 1977, its chambers were located in Freeling. On 13 March 1985, it lost areas around Gawler West and Willaston to the Town of Gawler.

In 1986, it covered an area of 662 square kilometres in an area described as "roughly bounded by the Light River to the north and the North Para and Gawler Rivers to the south", with a total population of 5,500. The main primary industries were cereal growing in the western, northern and central areas, market gardens and stud sheep in the south and vineyards and orchards in the east. The area included the Roseworthy Agricultural College and the Seppeltsfield winery.

It ceased to exist on 1 March 1996 when it was amalgamated with the District Council of Kapunda to form the District Council of Light and Kapunda (later renamed the Light Regional Council).

== Chairmen ==
- Clarence Kenneth Tremlett (1977)
- Brian Eric Anders (1977–1983)
- Donald William Barkley (1983–1986)
