= Light River (South Australia) =

River in South Australia

Light
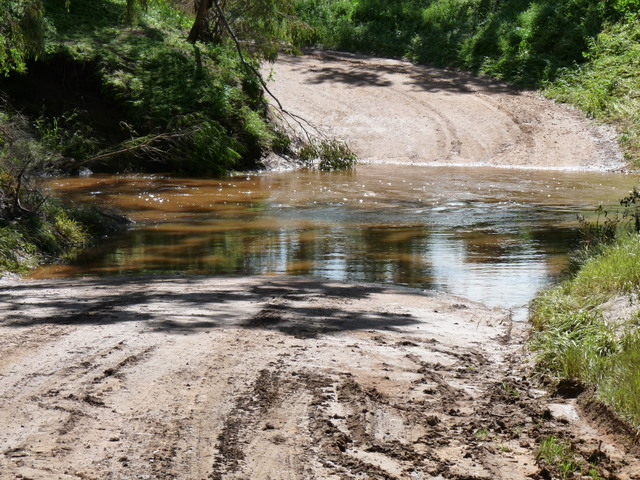
- Wasley Road ford through Light River, Korunye
- Etymology: In honour of William Light
- Native name: Yarralinka (Kaurna)

Location
- Country: Australia
- State: South Australia
- Region: Mid North

Physical characteristics
- Source: Mount Lofty Range
  - location: Waterloo
  - coordinates: 33°57′53″S 138°52′21″E
  - elevation: 449 m (1,473 ft)
- Mouth: Gulf St Vincent
  - coordinates: 34°34′43″S 138°21′35″E
  - elevation: 0 m (0 ft)
- Length: 164 km (102 mi)

Basin features
- Tributaries
  - left: Tothill Creek, Julia Creek, Pine Creek, St Kitts Creek
  - right: Gilbert River

The Light River (Kaurna: Yarralinka), commonly called the River Light, is a seasonal and significant river in the Mid North region of the Australian state of South Australia named for early surveyor William Light.

The River Light has given its name to the region of the state spanning the mid and lower part of the watercourse, which doesn't dry up over summer. The County of Light (cadastral land division) lies either side of the river for much of its course and gave rise to the name of three former local government bodies within the land division: the District Council of Light (1867–1892), the District Council of Light (1977–1996), and the present-day Light Regional Council, established in 1996. The locality of Lower Light spans the area where the river meets the coast in the Adelaide Plains and the Adelaide Plains Council was initially named Light from 1935 until 1937 after the river.

== Course and features ==
The Light River rises on the northern slopes of the Mount Lofty Range below Waterloo and flows generally south through the localities of Steelton, Marrabel, Hamilton, and Hansborough. Here, about halfway through its course, the river flows westerly past Kapunda, Linwood, Hamley Bridge, Mallala, and Lower Light. The river reaches its mouth and enters the Gulf St Vincent through a mangrove estuary. The river descends 447 metres (1,467 ft) over its 164-kilometre (102 mi) course.

The Light River has an expansive catchment within mainly undulating hills, much cleared since European settlement for farming and grazing purposes. There are no geological features that would permit a significant dam or reservoir. The noteworthy tributaries, by descending elevation, are Tothill Creek, Julia Creek, Pine Creek, St Kitts Creek, and the Gilbert River. The latter is a major tributary, merging into the Light River just below Hamley Bridge.

== History ==
The Indigenous name for the river is Yarralinka. The upper half of the Light River lies within the traditional lands of the Ngadjuri people of the Mid North, while much of the lower half is within the territory of the Kaurna people of the Adelaide Plains.

The river was later named after William Light, likely done by the exploration party of John Hill, William Wood, Charles Willis, and John Oakden, which left Adelaide on 1 March 1838 bound for the Murray River. Hill had accompanied William Light on his expedition of December 1837 when he encountered the Barossa Valley.

The first township planned on the River Light was Victoria, located near present Hamilton. At great expense the Secondary Towns Association in London took out the River Light Special Survey on 3 December 1841, through their Adelaide agents John Morphett and John Hill. This speculative venture was doomed when the following year copper ore was discovered nearby, giving rise to Kapunda. Today, Victoria is a quiet farming locality.

== Reputation ==
In the late 1840s and early 1850s when bullock teamsters carted ore from the Burra copper mines to Adelaide the upper reaches above Hamilton were commonly known by them as The Dirty Light, gaining this unflattering epithet from the deep mud they encountered in crossing it. This name then became ordinarily accepted for several decades thereafter, even by the government of the day.

The lower reaches are normally quiet, with peaceful chains of ponds in summer. However, at any time a thunderstorm in the large catchment can engender a severe flash flood. In the pioneering era, before bridges were built, these often caused drowning fatalities.

== See also ==
- List of rivers of Australia § South Australia
