= H. B. Hawke =

English-born Australian industrialist (1827–1904)

Henry Binney Hawke
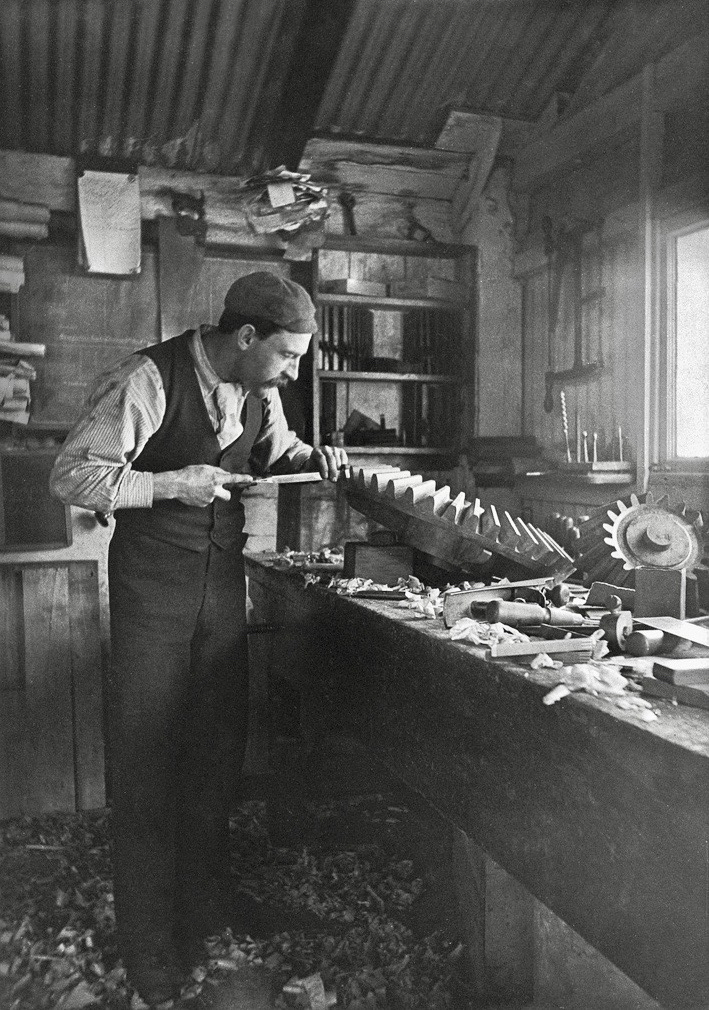
- H.B. Hawke, in his business clothes and a cloth cap, finishing a wooden pattern for a gear wheel that will be cast in his foundry
- Born: 3 October 1827; Cornwall, England
- Died: 17 March 1904 (aged 76); Kapunda, South Australia
- Burial place: Kapunda cemetery
- Occupation: Engineering innovator
- Known for: Agricultural machinery design and manufacture
- Spouse(s): 1. 1852: Christina Rayner (c. 1835 – 25 August 1866); 2. 1868: Julia Barkla (1840 – 20 June 1917)

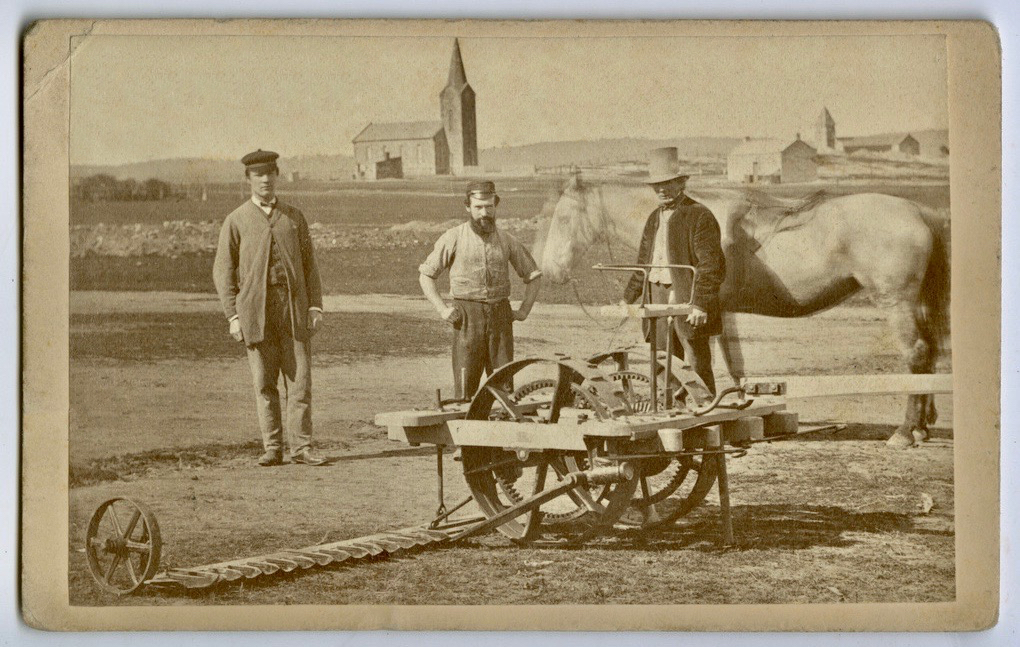
A mowing machine designed and manufactured by H.B. Hawke in 1867

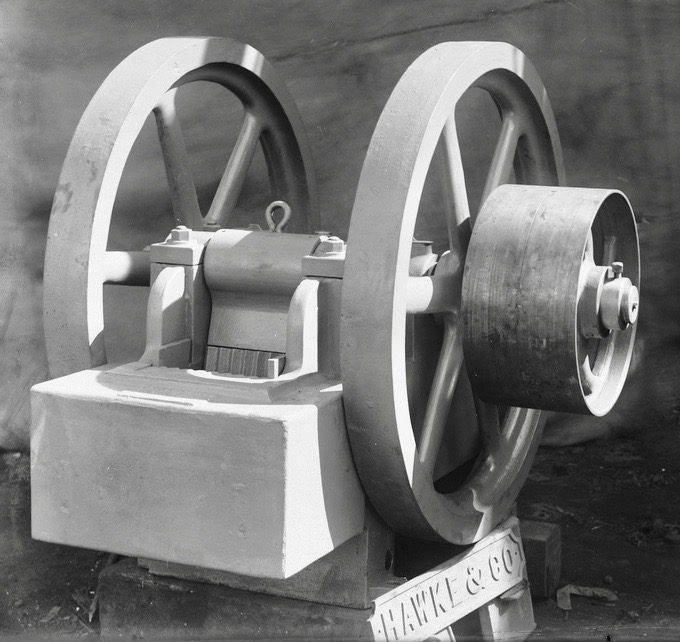
A cast-iron machinery component produced by the foundry

Henry Binney Hawke (October 1827 – 17 March 1904), usually referred to as H. B. Hawke, was an industrialist in Kapunda, South Australia, who founded the manufacturing business that became H. B. Hawke & Co. He was one of the many engineering innovators who played an active part in the economic development of South Australia in the 19th century by inventing and manufacturing machinery and processes for the rapidly expanding agricultural and mining industries, and for construction of infrastructure such as bridges, water management works and major buildings. (Note: Others included Alfred Simpson, John Ridley, Joseph Mellor, John Stokes Bagshaw, David Adamson, David Thompson, James Martin, Robert Cameron, David and John Shearer and the May brothers.)

== Early life ==
Hawke was born in Cornwall, orphaned and reputedly raised by a family of smugglers. He migrated to South Australia, arriving in January 1849 aboard the William Money at a time of high migration (11,000 in two years 1848–1849) from Britain. He found work with William Pybus's Victoria Foundry on Hindley Street, Adelaide, and within two years was able to purchase a property at the corner of Cambridge and Tynte streets, North Adelaide. (Note: The Victoria Foundry on Hindley Street, Adelaide was established by William Pybus, sen. (c. 1799–1854) and his son William Pybus, jun. (1820–1885). It was best known for casting bells, and also worked with cast iron from 1843.) Hawke was reported to have joined the rush to the Victorian goldfields around 1850. In January 1852 he married Christina Rayner, an 18-year-old fellow passenger on the William Money. In 1857, he moved to Kapunda, where he "took over" the small foundry associated with the Adamson Brothers' farm machinery works. (Note: The premises eventually occupied most of the 1.2 hectares (3.0 acres) block bounded by Main Street, South Terrace, Whittaker Street and Smedley Street.)

== Foundry ==
The first major cast iron product of the North Kapunda (later, Kapunda) Foundry was a weighbridge table weighing 3136 pounds (1422 kg) in May 1859. For a hundred years, through various changes of managers and ownership, the business's weighbridges remained a staple product, together with very large water pumps such as those on the River Murray, crushing plants (including the prototype Saunders Rapid stamp mill), road rollers, hydraulic presses and car hoists. A pit-head wheel weighing six or seven tons was cast for BHP; it was 9 feet (2.7 m) in diameter and 13 inches (330 mm) wide, grooved for 13 ropes. Hawke's business was the first to use Kapunda marble as a flux in smelting, which was also reported to have been used by the smelters at Broken Hill. In agricultural machinery the foundry produced the "Advance" mowing machine (the state's first), and Hawke's Patent broadcast seed-sower. A range of Hawke's machinery, including a cross-compound steam engine, is in the Kapunda Museum.

== Reputation ==
Hawke was a well-known and respected person who was appreciated for the business and employment he brought to the town. He was described, on account of his profound deafness, as not being able "publicly to take part in many movements connected with the town, but in his own private way he did much to help them on". In later years the only way to communicate with him was by writing. He took a great interest in scientific advances, and devoted much of his spare time to reading and mechanical inventions.

In June 1884 he sold the Kapunda Foundry and retired with his family to Port Lincoln, but in 1891 they returned to Kapunda.

== Company ==
The new owners of the business, who immediately renamed it H. B. Hawke & Co., were local businessmen William Thomas (c. 1854 – 5 November 1900) and his brother-in-law, Rees Rees (c. 1855 – 24 August 1935), both of whom would serve as mayors of Kapunda.

In 1895 William Thomas resigned, selling his share to politician David James. They remained business partners until 1903, when Rees became sole proprietor. The company remained in the Rees family until 1983, when the foundry ceased operation; the buildings associated with the business were demolished in 1984. The company has been described as having been "an integral part of the region’s survival and success for 126 years".

== Death ==
Hawke died suddenly on 17 March 1904, aged 76, while playing billiards at a Kapunda hotel with his son. He was buried at the Kapunda cemetery.

== Family ==
Hawke married Christina Rayner (c. 1835 – 25 August 1866), a fellow-passenger on the William Money, in January 1852. They had two surviving daughters:

- Evelyn Faith "Eva" Hawke (1855–1923) married Richard Randall Knuckey (?–1914) of Her Majesty's Customs Service on 14 November 1877. She was postmistress, Greenock and Truro.
- Amy Lilian "Lily" Hawke (1862–?) married Charles William France on 18 July 1883 and lived in Laverton, Western Australia.

Hawke married again in 1868, to Julia Barkla (1840 – 20 June 1917). Their children included:

- D'Arcy Melvin Hawke (1870-1926), of the Telegraph Department
- Ida Vanessa Eulalie Hawke (1871–1936) of Kapunda
- Ethel Maud Hawke (1873–?), who married George Thomas Bleechmore on 23 January 1901 and lived in Brisbane, Queensland
- Harold Binney Hawke (15 July 1878 – 7 February 1963), who married Clarice Kate Hales (1883–1975)
- Herbert Tyndal Hawke (1880–?)
- (Julia Ruby) Stella Hawke (1884–1965), who married Walter Cecil Marsden in 1905.
