= Kapunda =

- Town
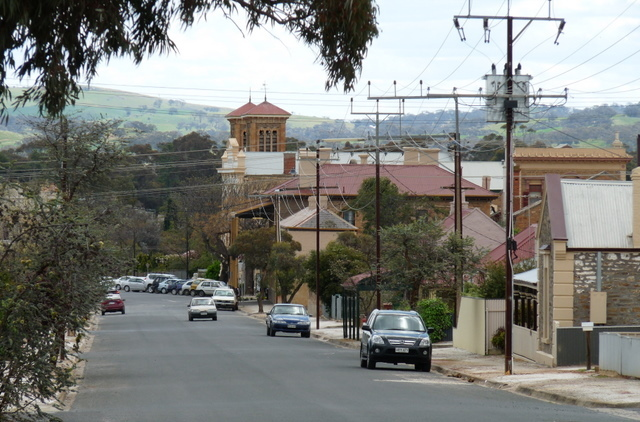
- Looking towards the Baptist church

- Coordinates: 34°20′20″S 138°55′00″E
- Country: Australia
- State: South Australia
- LGA: Light Regional Council
- Location: 77 km (48 mi) north of Adelaide
- Established: 1839

Government
  - State electorate: Frome
  - Federal division: Barker
- Elevation: 245 m (804 ft)

Population
  - Total: 2,633 (UCL 2021)
- Postcode: 5373
- Mean max temp: 21.6 °C (70.9 °F)
- Mean min temp: 9.8 °C (49.6 °F)
- Annual rainfall: 493.8 mm (19.44 in)
Localities around Kapunda
Tarlee	Allendale North, Hamilton	Bagot Well
Bethel	Kapunda	Koonunga
	Fords	St Johns

Kapunda is a town on the Light River near the Barossa Valley in South Australia. It was established after a discovery in 1842 of significant copper deposits.

The southern entrance to the town has been dominated since 1988 by the 8-metre (26 ft) statue of Map Kernow ("the son of Cornwall"), a traditional Cornish miner. The statue was destroyed by a fire in June 2006 but was rebuilt.

== History ==
Francis Dutton and Charles Bagot, who both ran sheep in the area, discovered copper ore outcrops in 1842. They purchased 80 acres (32 ha) around the outcrop, beginning mining early in 1844 after good assay results. Mining began with the removal of surface ore and had progressed to underground mining by the end of the year. Copper was mined until 1879. There are also quarries near the town which provide fine marble ranging from dark blue to white. Marble from the Kapunda quarries was used to face Parliament House in Adelaide, and the pedestal of the statue of Venus on North Terrace, Adelaide is made of Sicilian and Kapunda marble.

Ore was initially exported to Swansea in Wales, but later Welsh smelters migrated to South Australia and the ore was smelted locally by 1851. Typically, the miners were Cornish, labourers were Irish and smelter specialists were Welsh. Trade and agriculture were Scottish and English. German farmers and timber cutters at nearby Bethel had already been in the area. Underground mining became more difficult as the mines reached deeper. A steam engine to drive a water pump was installed in 1847, replaced by a larger one in 1851. Mining operations ground to a halt in 1851 with the impact of the Victorian gold rush, restarted in 1855. In 1865, the mine was leased to a Scottish company which switched to open-cut mining methods and replaced the smelters with a different treatment method (cooking the ore with salt to produce copper chloride). Copper prices fell in 1877 and the mine closed in 1879.

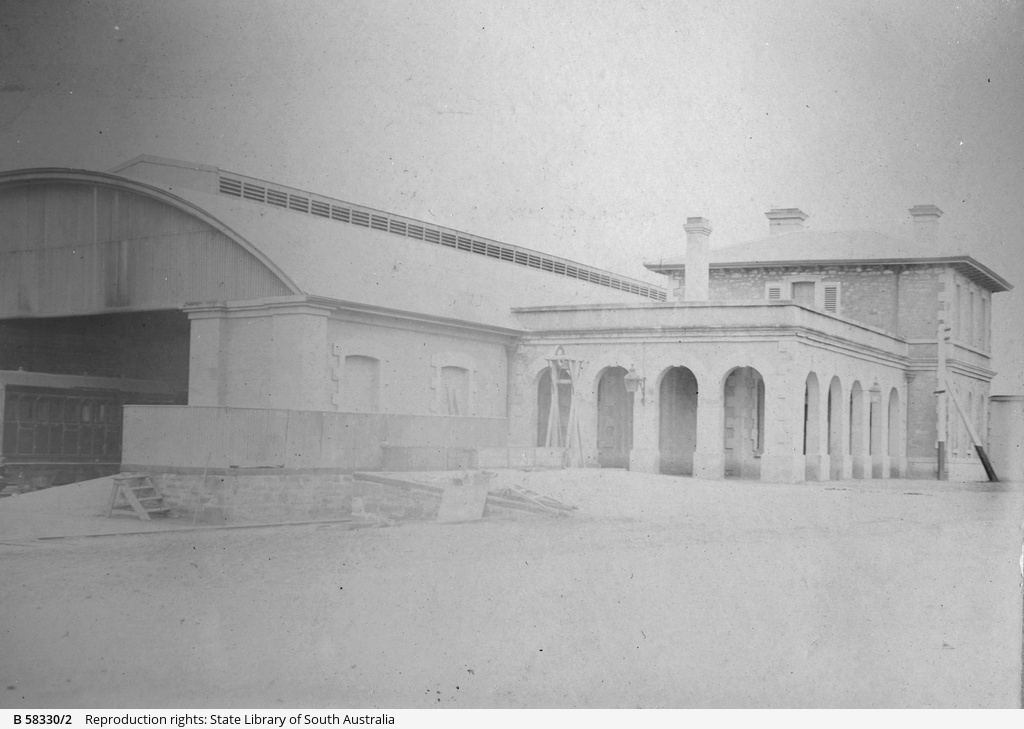
Kapunda Railway Station in 1908

A railway from Adelaide was opened in 1860, and extended to Eudunda and Morgan in 1878.

The Corporate Town of Kapunda was established in 1865 to form a local governing body for the township and the District Council of Kapunda was established the following year to govern the surrounds.

The Baptist Church building was constructed in 1866.

Kapunda is known for being the home of Sir Sidney Kidman (1859–1935). He was a major cattle pastoralist who at one time owned 68 properties with a total area larger than the British Isles. He held annual horse sales at Kapunda with up to 3,000 horses sold during the week. His house, Eringa, was donated to the Education Department in 1921, and it was used as the administration building for the Kapunda High School until it was gutted by fire on the night of 29 March 2022.

Kapunda was home to several notable manufacturers of farm and mining machinery: Robert Cameron, Joseph Mellors, James Rowe and Adamson Brothers. It was with this last-named company that Tobias Richards, the founder of, TJ Richards & Sons one of Australia's largest coach-building firms, started his career. HB Hawke & Co, began in 1857 and operated under various names. The firm closed in 1983.

In the 1850s Irish mine labourers and their families formed a communal settlement on unused land at Baker's Flat, south of Kapunda and adjacent to the mine, and successfully resisted attempts from the 1870s by the wealthy landowners to evict them. Although it no longer exists, archaeological digs by Flinders University researchers have revealed the remains of the settlement as having had a population of around 500, and being in the form of a traditional Irish clachan.

Kapunda had a strong Catholic community and Saint Mary MacKillop visited and established a convent there. St John's Reformatory for Girls operated from 1897 to 1909.

Historical population
Year	Pop.	±%
1921	1,564	—
1933	1,388	−11.3%
1947	1,236	−11.0%
1954	1,185	−4.1%
1961	1,164	−1.8%
1966	1,119	−3.9%
1971	1,261	+12.7%
1976	1,362	+8.0%
1981	1,340	−1.6%
1986	1,622	+21.0%
1991	1,979	+22.0%
1996	2,195	+10.9%
2001	2,301	+4.8%
2006	2,480	+7.8%
2011	2,484	+0.2%
2016	2,598	+4.6%
2021	2,633	+1.3%
Source: Australian Bureau of Statistics data.

== Description ==
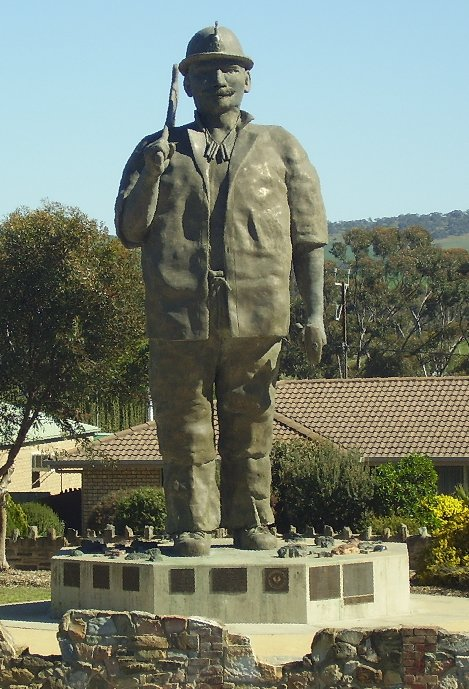
The restored Map the Miner statue

The southern entrance to the town has been dominated since 1988 by the 8-metre (26 ft) statue of Map Kernow ("the son of Cornwall"), a traditional Cornish miner. The statue was destroyed by a fire on the morning of 1 June 2006 but has since been rebuilt by its creator, Ben van Zetten.

Today, Kapunda is a producer of cereal crops, mainly wheat, barley and oats. Value-added services carried out by local industry include stock feed milling and hay processing. Kapunda is a contributor to the wine-growing industry centred in the nearby Barossa Valley.

The population was 2,633 in the 2021 census.

The Kapunda Historical Society runs a museum housed in the old Baptist Church building.

Kapunda has hosted the Kapunda Celtic Music Festival since 1976.

The town was titled the most haunted town in Australia after a television documentary went to air about this, which led to an increase in the number of tourists that visit the area. The ruins of the Reformatory, located outside the town, were bulldozed for this reason.

The town is close to the historic Anlaby Station with its 23-room homestead, houses, gardens and other buildings on the property, many of which are being restored by its current owners.

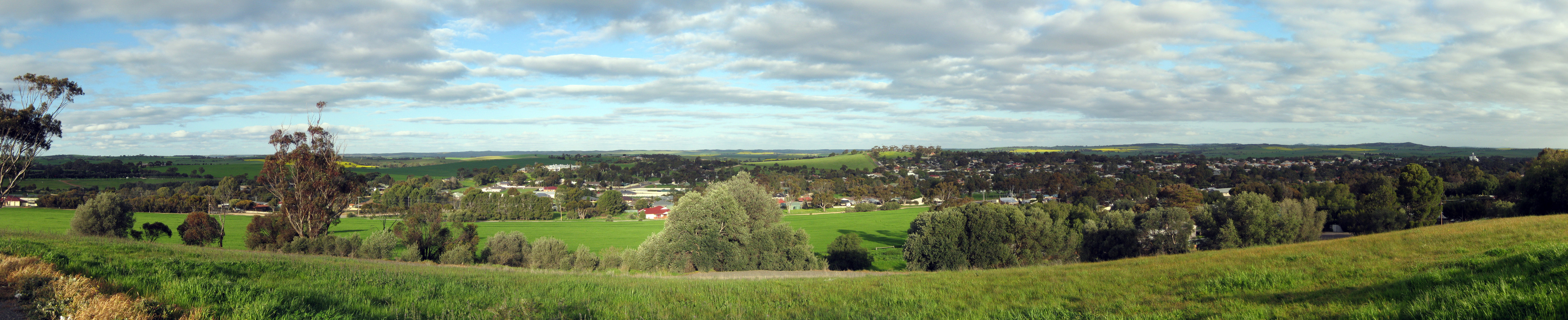
Panoramic view of the town of Kapunda, as seen from Gundry's Hill Lookout on the outskirts of the town.

== Climate ==
Kapunda has a hot-summer mediterranean climate#mediterranean climate (Köppen: Csa/Csb), with very warm, dry summers and cool, wetter winters. Temperatures vary throughout the year, with average maxima ranging from 29.7 °C (85.5 °F) in January to 13.5 °C (56.3 °F) in July, and average minima fluctuating between 14.6 °C (58.3 °F) in February and 5.3 °C (41.5 °F) in July. Annual precipitation is somewhat low, averaging 491.7 mm (19.36 in) between 104.8 precipitation days. Extreme temperatures have ranged from 45.4 °C (113.7 °F) on 9 January 1939 to −3.3 °C (26.1 °F) on 9 July 1959.

Climate data for Kapunda (34º20'24"S, 138º55'12"E, 245 m AMSL) (1861-2024 normals, extremes 1927-1965)
Month	Jan	Feb	Mar	Apr	May	Jun	Jul	Aug	Sep	Oct	Nov	Dec	Year
Record high °C (°F)	45.4 (113.7)	43.9 (111.0)	42.4 (108.3)	37.9 (100.2)	29.8 (85.6)	25.6 (78.1)	22.6 (72.7)	26.1 (79.0)	32.4 (90.3)	37.4 (99.3)	42.2 (108.0)	42.8 (109.0)	45.4 (113.7)
Mean daily maximum °C (°F)	29.7 (85.5)	29.3 (84.7)	26.6 (79.9)	21.5 (70.7)	17.5 (63.5)	14.2 (57.6)	13.5 (56.3)	15.0 (59.0)	17.9 (64.2)	21.3 (70.3)	25.1 (77.2)	27.9 (82.2)	21.6 (70.9)
Mean daily minimum °C (°F)	14.5 (58.1)	14.6 (58.3)	12.7 (54.9)	10.1 (50.2)	7.9 (46.2)	6.2 (43.2)	5.3 (41.5)	5.8 (42.4)	6.9 (44.4)	8.8 (47.8)	11.2 (52.2)	13.2 (55.8)	9.8 (49.6)
Record low °C (°F)	5.1 (41.2)	6.1 (43.0)	2.8 (37.0)	1.7 (35.1)	−0.3 (31.5)	−2.8 (27.0)	−3.3 (26.1)	−1.7 (28.9)	−1.1 (30.0)	0.6 (33.1)	1.6 (34.9)	4.4 (39.9)	−3.3 (26.1)
Average precipitation mm (inches)	20.2 (0.80)	20.5 (0.81)	23.4 (0.92)	37.4 (1.47)	53.3 (2.10)	57.6 (2.27)	59.2 (2.33)	61.6 (2.43)	54.7 (2.15)	46.0 (1.81)	31.8 (1.25)	26.0 (1.02)	491.7 (19.36)
Average precipitation days (≥ 0.2 mm)	3.9	3.5	4.6	7.3	10.8	12.7	14.3	14.5	11.8	9.6	6.6	5.2	104.8
Average afternoon relative humidity (%)	31	34	35	45	55	62	61	56	48	43	35	33	45
Source: Bureau of Meteorology (1861-2024 normals, extremes 1927-1965)

== Historic buildings ==
=== Church ===
The second St Rose of Lima Catholic Church, replacing one designed by Edmund Wright and E. J. Woods built in 1866 and subsequently demolished, was built in 1938, to designs by Herbert Jory in Romanesque Revival style, and has been described as "perhaps Jory's Romanesque masterpiece". The Sydney-based magazine Builder commented that "the long narrow window openings, infilled with cast cement grilles, the design of which has an Eastern flavour, are an interesting innovation".

=== Eringa ===
The house which became known as Sir Stanley Kidman's home, Eringa, was built in 1876 by Alexander H. Greenshields, who named it Lanark House after his birthplace, Lanark, in Scotland. Greenshields was a prominent citizen, who built up a drapery business and was a member of many local organisations, as well as the municipal council. The grounds and conservatories of Lanark House occupied nearly 4 acres (1.6 ha). Greenshields died in 1897 and Kidman acquired the property around 1900 and used it as his residence, naming it Eringa after one of his properties, Eringa Station. It was damaged by fire in 1902.

After gifting it to Kapunda High School in 1921, the building was originally used as classrooms, then as the library until 2010, and after that as an administration building. The building was heritage-listed, and in 2011–12 the South Australian Government funded a major refurbishment. On the night of 29 March 2022, the building caught fire, having spread from a nearby transportable classroom building. Eighty firefighters from the Metropolitan Fire Service battled the blaze, but were hampered by a limited water supply, and explosions around the building. The walls were left standing, but there was significant damage to the roof. Staff members were "heartbroken". Writer Colin Thiele once described the school as "unique".

== Media ==
Kapunda was home to several newspapers. The Kapunda Herald (known as the Northern Star from 1860 to 1863 and the Kapunda Herald and Northern Intelligencer from 1864 to 1878) was printed in the town until 1951, when it was merged with the Barossa News to become the Barossa and Light Herald.

Another publication, the Farmers' Weekly Messenger (4 April 1874 – 27 September 1878) was also printed in Kapunda by Ebenezer Ward. Within a month, in May 1874, it absorbed another Ward newspaper, Northern Guardian (1 April – 6 May 1874), which itself was a continuation of the Guardian and Northern and North-eastern Advertiser (19 May 1871 – 28 March 1874) and the short-lived Gumeracha Guardian and North-eastern Advertiser (19 March 1870 – 20 October 1870).

The North Kapunda Hotel was featured on television show Haunting: Australia, when cast member Allen Tiller, who was a local at the time, requested to producers, Flame Productions, that Kapunda, known as Australia's Most Haunted Town, should be a feature on the show. Haunting: Australia aired internationally in 2014.

== Government ==
Kapunda is in the state electoral district of Frome (since the 2020 redistribution) and the federal Division of Barker. Kapunda hosts the meeting chamber and main office of the Light Regional Council.

== Healthcare ==
The Kapunda Hospital is the main hospital in the Light Valley. However, its birthing and emergency services have intermittently been reported as closed for short periods because of COVID-19 pandemic. Kapunda Homes, a residential aged care facility, occupies an extension wing of Kapunda Hospital.

== List of mayors ==
Note This list currently ends in the 1950s due to the limitations of Trove.

- 1865–1866 Dr Matthew Henry Smyth-Blood (c. 1806 – 29 March 1883)
- 1867–1868 James Pearce (1825 – 5 November 1904) donated his mayoral allowance to a "bounty fund"
- 1869–1870 David Nock (c. 1829–1909)
- 1871 John Perry Moyle (c. 1826–1880)
- 1872–1874 Richard John Day ( –1916)
- 1875–1876 J P Moyle*
- 1877 M H Smyth-Blood*
- 1878–1880 Joseph Rowett (c. 1825–1898)
- 1881–1882 Robert Cameron (c. 1865–1893) founded Vulcan Iron works.
- 1883–1885 John Fox Mellor (1841–1914) of Mellor Brothers, farm machinery makers.
- 1886–1887 James Wheatley (Note: Not James Edward Wheatley, music teacher of Kapunda, who married Wilhelmine Magdalene Basedow in 1870 and died in 1878.) machinist
- 1888–1889 David James
- 1890 Thomas David Nock (1850–1922) son of David Nock*
- 1891–1892 Alfred Palmer
- 1893–1895 William Thomas, foundryworker and bookseller
- 1896–1899 Evan James, brother of David James*
- 1900 (resigned April) Henry Jackson (c. 1840–1912)
- 1900–1905 David James* elected to SA Parliament May 1902
- 1906-1907 John Henry Hitchens
- 1908–1911 Rees Rees
- 1912–1914 Alfred Menhennett
- 1915–1916 Samuel Ephraim Hancock
- 1917–1918 Thomas Jeffs
- 1919–1922 Herbert John Skull
- 1923 Henry James Truscott
- 1924–1927 Richard Hawke
- 1928–1932 Thomas Samuel Davie
- 1933–July 1936 William Thomas Truscott (son of H J Truscott*)
- 1936–July 1942 Clair Hubert Branson (1886–1967) of Greenock, baker in Kapunda from 1917.
- 1942–July 1952 Horatio Hildabert Rees (son of mayor Rees Rees*)
- 1952 Leslie Noke Tilbrook
- 1953– C H Branson*

*Second entry for this person, see above

== Notable people ==
- Ellen Ida Benham (1871–1917), educationist
- Vivian Bullwinkel (1915–2000), Australian Army nurse, P.O.W.
- Walter Dyer (1882–1965), New Zealand board member and chairperson of many education organisations; born in Kapunda
- Bert Hawke (1900–1986), Premier of Western Australia
- Rosanne Hawke (born 1953), author
- Alice Rosman (1882–1961), writer
- Sidney Kidman (1859–1935), pastoralist
- Darcie Brown (born 2003), cricketer

== Gallery ==
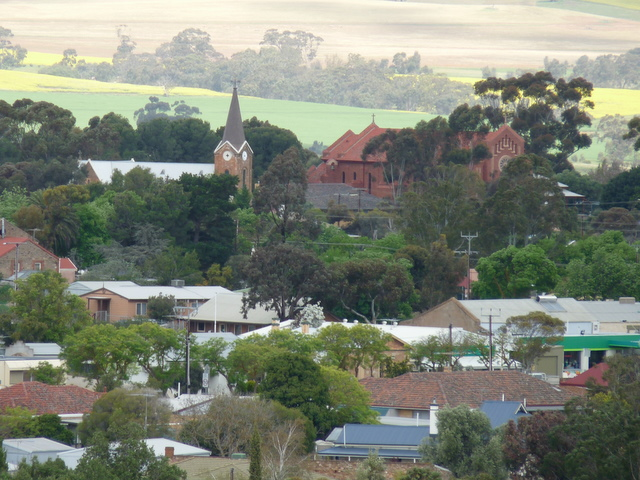
View of the Anglican and Catholic churches from Gundry's Hill Lookout

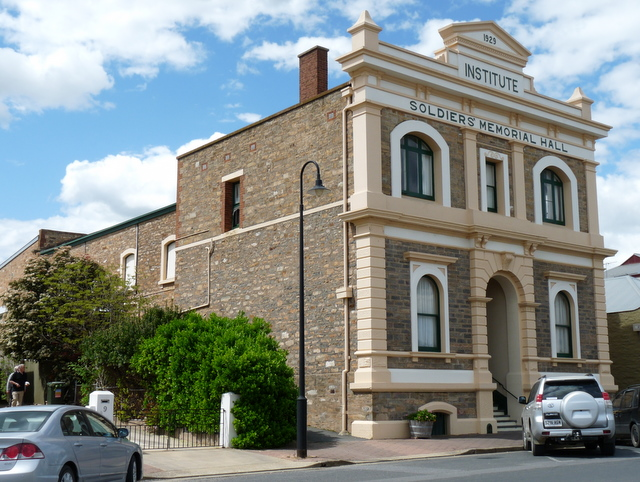
Institute and soldiers' memorial hall

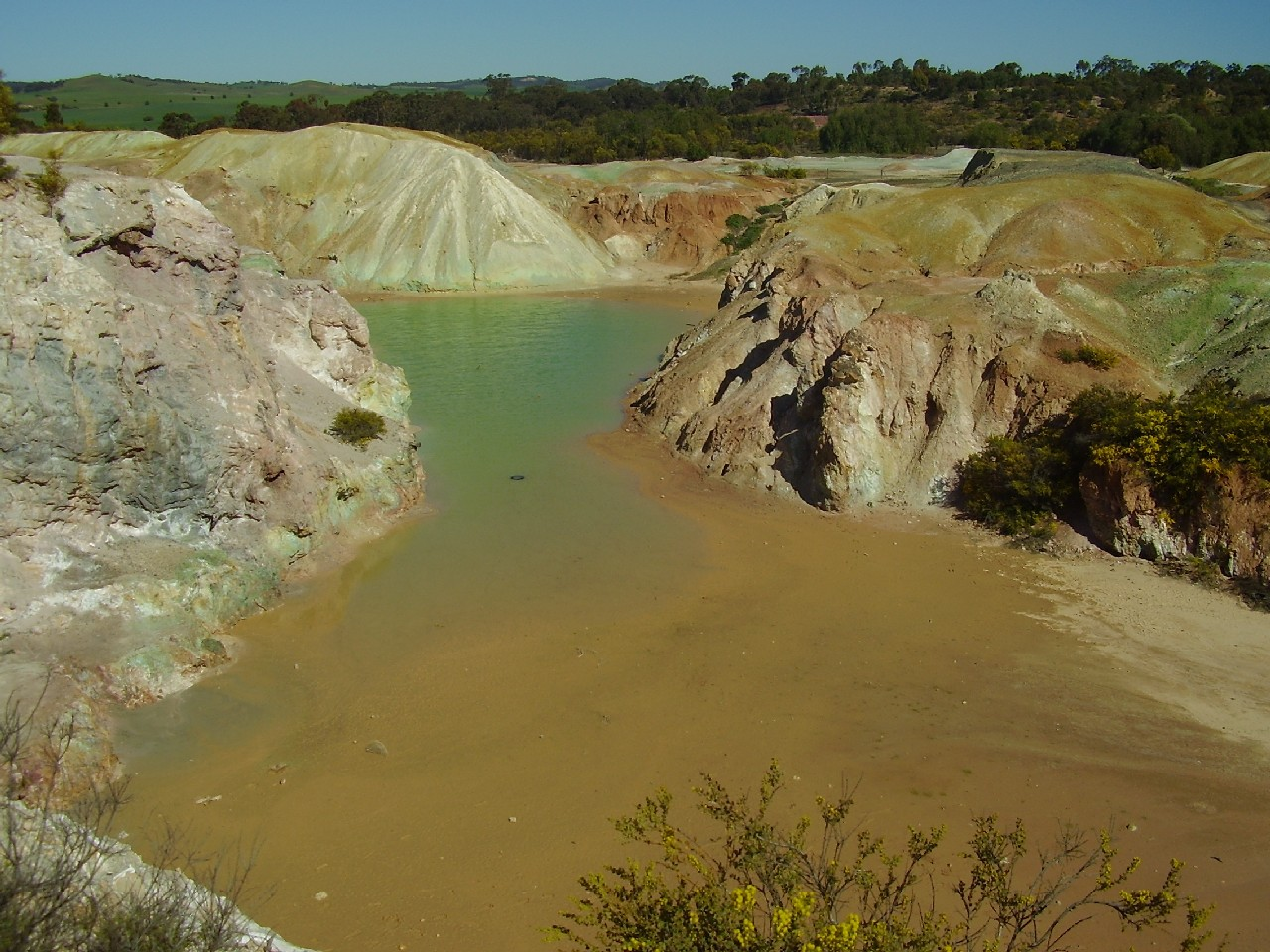
The main open pit mine, now part of a museum site

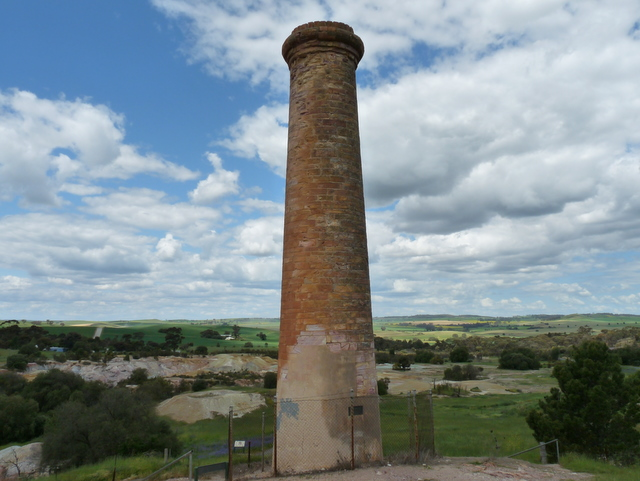
View of the Kapunda mine site looking east, with the chimney stack in the foreground.
