= T. J. Richards =

Australian businessman coachbuilder (1850–1939)

Tobias John Martin Richards (3 February 1850 – 28 July 1939), invariably referred to as "T. J. Richards", was an Australian coachbuilder and motor body manufacturer who founded the company which would eventually form the manufacturing base of Chrysler Australia.

== History ==
=== Early life ===
Richards was the eldest son of John Martin Richards (1824 – 2 June 1867) and his wife Catherine T. Richards (1823 – 15 April 1908), née Reed. The Reeds were Wesleyan Methodists from Cornwall who migrated to Australia in 1842, where Catherine met and married John Richards, who had a position with the Tasmanian government. They had one daughter before moving to South Australia, with some of her relatives, in 1845. Richards was born at Montacute, then the site of a copper mine. John and Catherine went on to have total of 15 children.

Richards grew up in Kapunda, and was still living there when his father, a teacher and journalist, drowned in the waters of a local dam while intoxicated. Richards, aged 17, was a witness at the inquest.

=== Career ===
Richards first employment was with Adamson Brothers, a farm machinery manufacturer in Kapunda. He tried other trades, including cordial manufacturing in Gawler before working as a blacksmith in Unley around 1881. He learned the craft of coachbuilding from Ludwig Maraun of Hindmarsh Square and Pirie Street, which led in 1885 to his opening a small coachbuilding shop in Pulteney Street, in partnership with J. W. Fisher, dissolved 1886, after which his business address was given as Pulteney Street. In 1887 he first exhibited a waggonette at the Adelaide Show.

Richards moved to West Mitcham, near the railway station, some time before 1889. At the 1893 Adelaide Show he exhibited a "first-class assortment of vehicles, comprising expresses, waggonettes, and buggies". By 1896 he was showing his firm's products at such country shows in Terowie, Mount Barker, Mount Pleasant, Snowtown, Gawler, Kadina, Jamestown, Kapunda. By 1900 he had additional premises on Hindmarsh Square. By 1905 his display at the Autumn Show exhibited some 35 designs, mostly sulkies, including his "King of the Road" design and despite the prevailing depression had his staff working overtime.

He served for many years as a coachbuilding judge at Sydney Royal Shows and was in 1908 elected president of the Coachbuilders' and Wheelwrights' Society and was a prominent member of the Chamber of Manufactures, Australian Natives' Association, Royal Agricultural and Horticultural Society, and the Master Carriage and Waggon Builders' Association. He retired from business in 1911 and the firm became T. J. Richards & Sons, and added motor body building to their range around the same time.

Richards was a keen gardener and player of croquet and lawn bowls.

== Subsequent company history ==
From 1911 the Hindmarsh Square premises was advertised as "King of the Road Works" and "Australia's leading coachbuilders". In 1914 the firm began selling Dixi, Palmer-Moore and Swift motor vehicles and Rudge and Pope motor-cycles from premises at 95–99 Pulteney Street. The following year they won the exclusive agency for Studebaker automobiles, while H. C. Richards independently opened an agency in Blyth Street for Oakland cars (he returned to head the company when his father retired). T. J. Richards & Sons was founded in 1916 and opened a new workshop and showroom in an adjoining building at 132 Pirie Street in 1917, but three years later sold the whole complex, which occupied substantial frontages on Hindmarsh Square, Pirie Street and Hyde Street and included two 3-storey buildings and moved to a large new factory covering 14 acres (5.7 ha) on Leader Street Keswick (now Le Cornu's furniture warehouse) and manufacture concentrated on their "King of the Road" motor bodies, which were built on chassis made by such companies as Dodge and Hudson's Terraplane.

In 1928 a second factory was opened at Mile End, covering 11 acres. In the same year the company forged a relationship with the Chrysler Corporation and subsequently the production of bodies for Chrysler, Dodge, DeSoto and Plymouth automobiles became its main activity. In 1936 the recently formed Australian company Chrysler Dodge Distributors Limited purchased a financial stake in T. J. Richards & Sons, taking a controlling interest the following year. In 1941 T. J. Richards & Sons was renamed to Richards Industries Limited and the Richards family sold their remaining interest in the company to Chrysler Dodge Distributors Limited in 1946. The name was changed again, to Chrysler Dodge DeSoto Distributors Limited, and the parent company also changed its name, to Chrysler Dodge Distributors (Holdings) Pty Ltd. In 1951 the American Chrysler Corporation bought 85% of Chrysler Dodge Distributors (Holdings) Pty Ltd and renamed it Chrysler Australia.

== Family ==
Richards married Matilda Emily Freeman (16 February 1854 – 25 January 1938) of Mount Barker on 31 March 1875. Their children included:

- H. C. (Herbert Clarence) Richards (30 January 1876 – 11 April 1949) married Mary Ann Macklin (11 January 1873 – 15 November 1968) of Macclesfield on 13 April 1899. He took over as Chairman of Directors of T. J. Richards & Sons with the retirement of his father, was Mayor of Unley 1921–1922 and a Member of Parliament.
- H. E. (Henry Ernest) (29 April 1878 – 18 May 1915) married Marguerite (or Margaret) Josephine "Daisy" Evans (17 October 1882 – 25 May 1947) on 4 November 1903. He worked as a coachbuilder for the family business, but died after crashing his motorcycle into a dray.
- C. G. (Cecil Graham) Richards (19 November 1880 – 1946) married Ethel M. Raven on 2 August 1904.
- C. A. (Claude Alfred Victor) Richards (11 October 1882– 1950) was for many years managing director of T. J. Richards & Sons.
- W. E. (William Egbert Tobias) Richards (23 June 1884 – 1953) married Annie Lillian Evans (15 March 1884 – ) on 6 April 1909
- (Beatrice) Alice Richards (30 September 1886 – 1973) married John George "Jack" Emmett (24 Apr 1884 – 1959) on 10 December 1913
- A. S. (Alfred Samuel) Richards (7 April 1890 – 1952) married Ada Lily Cole (4 Feb 1890 – ) on 25 September 1915
- Eveline Matilda Jane Richards (1 October 1892 – 1973) married Arthur William Temme (29 Aug 1888 – 1956) on 26 June 1914, had a home at Kingswood
- Mabel Agnes Annie Richards (28 October 1894 – 1984) married (George) Leslie Heath of Kingswood

Their home until 1914 was "Mundaring", Lower Mitcham, then 93 Cambridge Terrace, Malvern, South Australia, where he died.
