= Fords, South Australia =

Fords
- Town
- Coordinates: 34.4°S 138.8°E
- Country: Australia
- State: South Australia
- LGA: Light Regional Council
- Location: 9 km (5.6 mi) SW of Kapunda; 27 km (17 mi) N of Gawler

Government
  - State electorate: Stuart
  - Federal division: Barker
- Elevation: 215 m (705 ft)

Population
  - Total: 81 (SAL 2021)
- Postcode: 5373
- Gazetted: 2000
Localities around Fords
Bethel	Kapunda	St Johns
Linwood	Fords	Moppa
Freeling	Nain	Greenock

Fords is a locality in the Mid North region of South Australia, southwest of Kapunda, South Australia. It is crossed by the Thiele Highway, and the former Morgan railway line. The northern boundary of Fords is the Light River. Fords is named after an early landowner, John Ford.
