= St Johns, South Australia =

St Johns South Australia
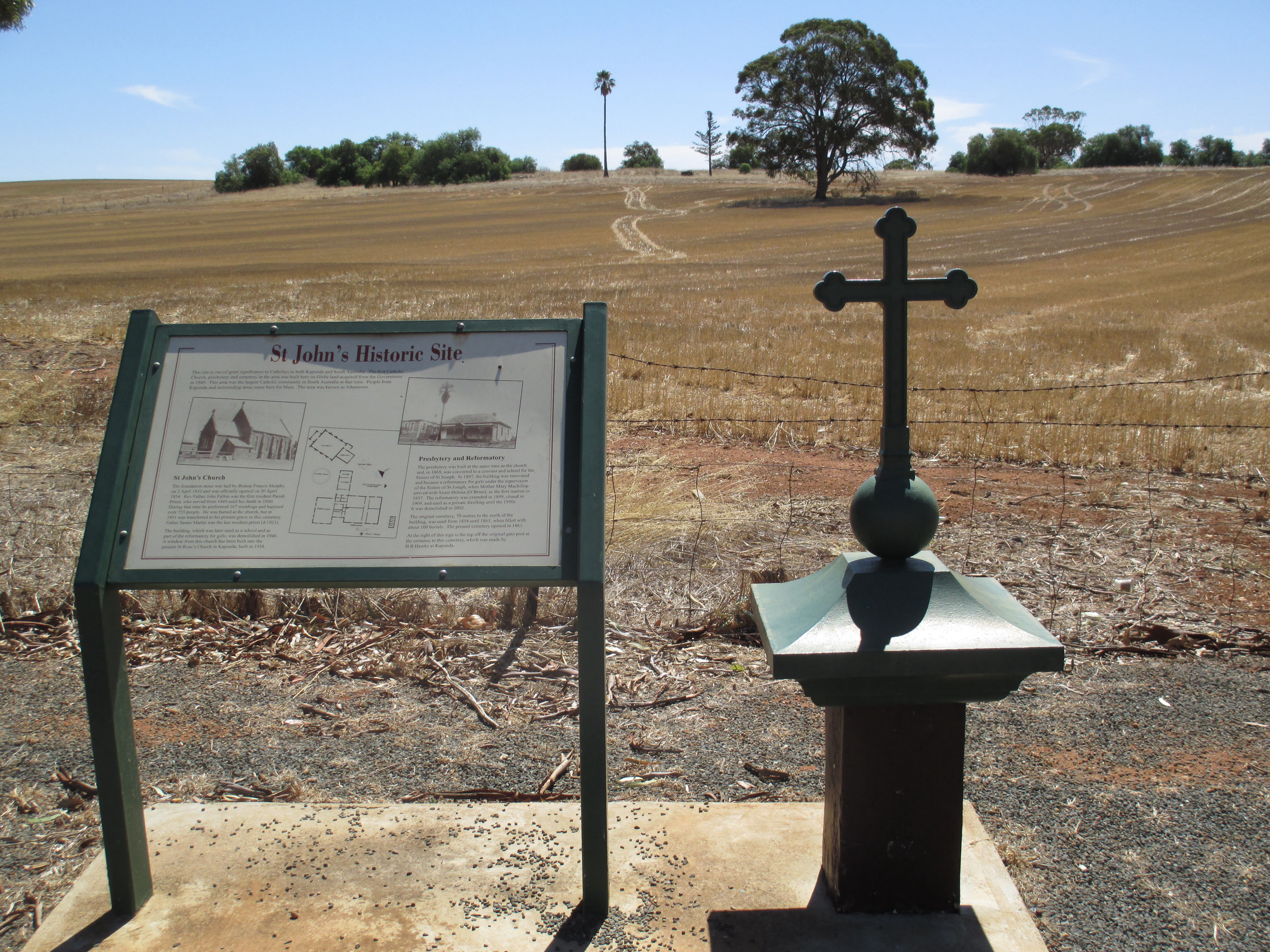
- View towards the former church and reformatory from the cemetery

- Coordinates: 34°21′46″S 138°57′34″E
- Population: 8 (SAL 2021)
- Postcode(s): 5373
- LGA(s): Light Regional Council
- State electorate(s): Stuart
- Federal division(s): Barker
Localities around St Johns:
	Kapunda
Fords	St Johns	Koonunga
	Moppa

St Johns is a locality southeast of Kapunda in the northern Barossa Valley, South Australia. Originally a private subdivision on sections 1450, 1451 and 1533 of the Hundred of Belvidere, the boundaries of the locality were formalised in 2000 and the name formally adopted based on long-established use.

The foundation stone for the St John the Evangelist church was laid on 2 April 1850, however the building was not completed until 30 April 1854. A school was opened in 1859, run by the Sisters of St Joseph of the Sacred Heart after 1868. From 1897, the school became a reformatory for girls until it closed in 1909.
