= Bethel, South Australia =

Bethel South Australia
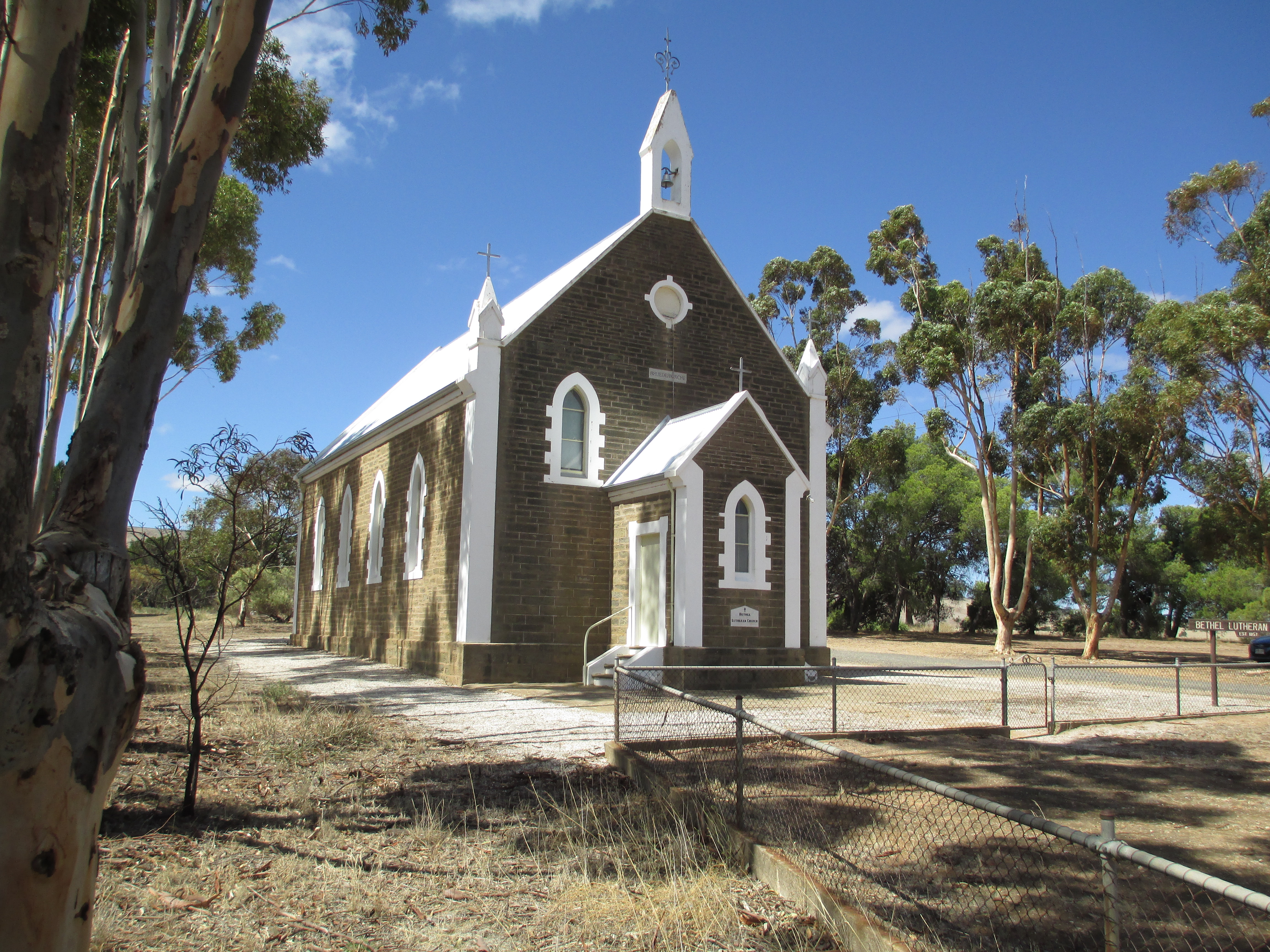
- Bethel Lutheran Church in 2015

- Coordinates: 34.327840°S 138.837630°E
- Population: 52 (SAL 2021)
- Postcode(s): 5373
- Location: 9 km (6 mi) W of Kapunda
- LGA(s): Light Regional Council
- State electorate(s): Stuart
- Federal division(s): Barker
Localities around Bethel:
| Tarlee |
| Stockport | Bethel | Kapunda |
| Linwood | Fords |

Bethel is a locality and former settlement in South Australia, west of Kapunda. Its name means Place of God.

Bethel was settled by German-speaking people in around 1854 seeking to establish a Moravian Brethren community. From 1856 there was also a group of people of Wendish origin. They also spoke German. Some of these settlers initially worshipped with the Moravians, however a new church was built named Steinthal and many worshipped there instead. The Bethel congregation severed its links with the Moravians and called a Lutheran pastor in the 1890s. The Steinthal church closed and combined in 1906. The school was closed by the state government in 1917 along with many others that taught in German.
