= Map the Miner =

Statue in South Australia

Coordinates: 34.3521°S 138.9067°E

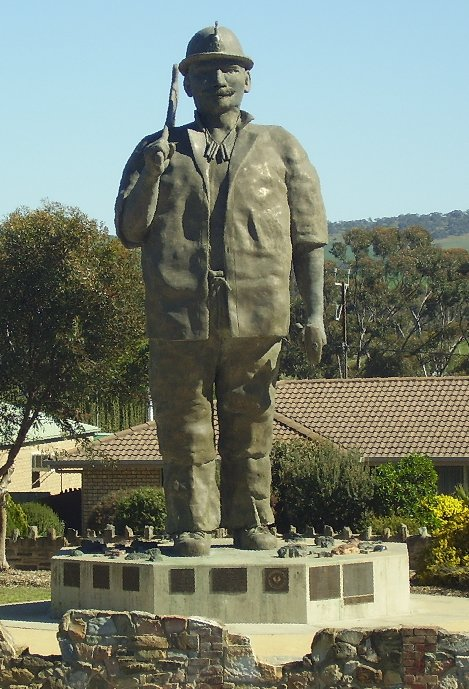
- The rebuilt statue in 2007
- Artists: Ben van Zetten; Lawry Love Grima
- Year: 2007
- Medium: Bronze (current)
- Dimensions: 7 m (280 in)
- Location: Kapunda, South Australia

Map the Miner, also known as Map Kernow or the Son of Cornwall, is a 7-metre (23 ft) statue commemorating the Cornish mining history of the town of Kapunda in South Australia. Built by Ben van Zetten, the statue stands to at the southern entrance to the town, and is regarded as one of Australia's Big Things. The statue was destroyed by fire in 2006, but it was rebuilt and rededicated 12 months later.

== History ==
The Kapunda copper mine operated from 1844 to 1878, and was the first metal mine in Australia to achieve success. It produced over £1 million worth of copper ore, and relied heavily on Cornish immigrants for its operation. In 1986 local resident John Davidson suggested that a memorial be built to commemorate the influence that the Cornish miners had on Kapunda's (and South Australia's) development, and he sought funding through South Australia's sesquicentenary celebrations. Although funding was not forthcoming, the process brought him into contact with Ben van Zetten, a Dutch artist living in a nearby town. Van Zetten agreed to design and build the work, so Davidson turned to the local Rotary Club for support, who then organised a successful community fundraising campaign.

Located on Gawler Road to the south of the town, the statue took three months to build and was opened during Australia's Bicentenary celebrations by the South Australian Minister for Mines and Energy, Ron Payne. The ceremony included a speech by the Cornish Association's Ron Daw, and Trelawny was played while participants "partied on saffron cake and clotted cream".

The original statue stood until 1 June 2006 when it was destroyed. A local teenager poured Eranol (molecular iodine) around the statue, splashing some of the accelerant on the statue's right leg. Although his intent was to take a photo of the statue surrounded by a "ring of fire", and he did not intend to cause significant harm to the work, the resulting fire caused A$95,000 worth of damage and the statue had to be demolished.

Fortunately the statue was insured for A$140,000, and the original artist—Ben van Zetten with help from artist Lawry Love Grima—agreed to rebuild the work. The new statue was rededicated on the site of the old on 3 June 2007, just over a year after the original was destroyed. The replacement Map the Miner was said to be "much more resistant to damage" than the original, and the artist stated that the new version looked "far better than before", as the manufacturing process allowed the bronze colouring to be more apparent.

== Design and construction ==
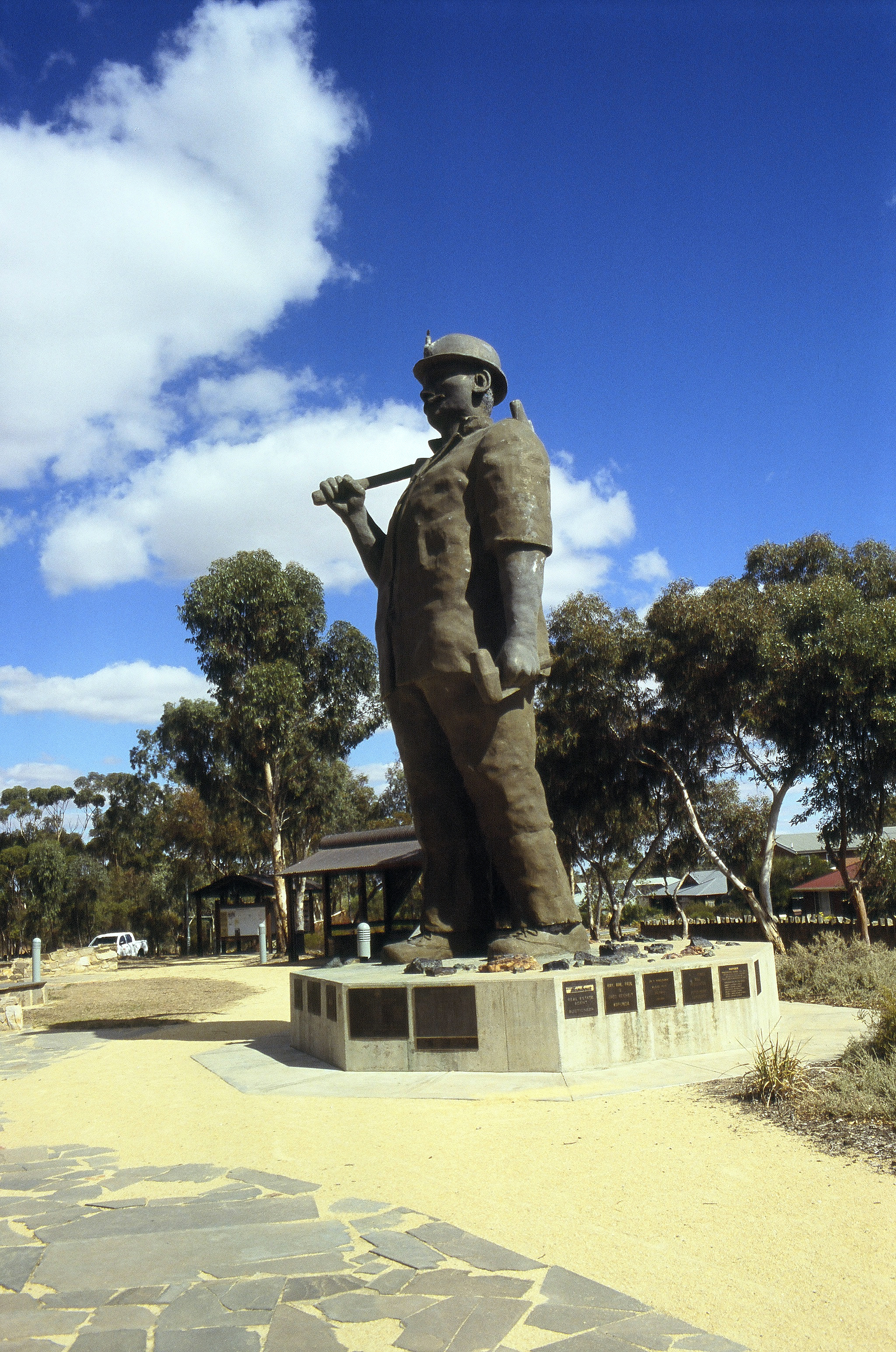
Side view

The core of the original statue was a steel frame that was attached to a concrete base. The artist then layered fiberglass over the frame, using "freehand grinding and chipping" techniques to form the final texture. The process took approximately three months. The statue stood 7 metres (23 ft) tall and depicted a "mid-nineteenth century" miner, wearing a felt hat and bearing a mallet in one hand and a pick over his shoulder. A candle was attached to his hat, and spare candles were worn around his neck. The new statue takes the same form, but unlike the original cold cast bronze was employed in the construction.
