= Mellor Brothers =

Farm machinery manufacturer

Mellor Brothers was a farm machinery manufacturer in the early days of the colony of South Australia, founded by Joseph Mellor, and carried on by two of their four sons.

== History ==
Joseph Mellor, his wife Mary née Fox, and son Thomas Fox Mellor arrived in South Australia aboard Fairlie (often spelled Fairleigh) in July 1840.

Also on board were his parents Thomas Mellor, his wife Margaret née Thornton, their unmarried daughters Mary and Delia and married daughters Elizabeth Walker and Nancy Turner with their husbands and young families.

The Mellors were to have three more sons, two of whom would figure prominently in the company's development.

Joseph Mellor set himself up in business in Morphett Street as a carpenter and wheelwright, and was soon employing around five men and advertising manufacture of drays, wheelbarrows, harrows and other simple farming implements. By 1857 he was employing over fifty and had a second factory on Town Acre 246, Franklin Street adjacent to the original one on Town Acre 245 on the north-west corner of Morphett and Franklin streets. By 1859 he had 100 men and had agents in Melbourne, Wahgunyah and Beechworth in Victoria, and Goolwa in South Australia.

At the 1862 International Exhibition his reaping and harvesting machine won a medal, and was later sold to Russia. At the Grand General Show, held in conjunction with the Royal Visit of 1867, Mellor won a good number of prizes. Mellor was a member of the Agricultural and Horticultural Society. 1855–1862

In 1863 he purchased a block of land south of the railway line at Kapunda and opened a factory 140 by 30 feet (43 m × 9 m) at the corner of Carrington and Cambria streets, with around 15 men under the supervision of his son James F. Mellor, which in 1864 produced 110 reaping machines.

=== Mellor Bros. ===
In 1869 Joseph Mellor relinquished control of the Franklin Street Machine and Wheel Works in favour of his two elder sons, Thomas Fox Mellor and James Fox Mellor, who were joined at some later stage by Benjamin Fox Mellor. Thomas, who was little interested in engineering, served as manager for a time, then left to pursue a business career.

In June 1873 Mellor Brothers was the first in South Australia to adopt the eight-hour day principle for their workers.

James F. Mellor resided at Kapunda, and supervised that factory. In 1876 they erected a facility in Jamestown with some workshop facilities, managed by one J. W. Stephens. Agricultural machines fabricated in Kapunda were carried by road to Jamestown as it was cheaper than by rail, but at the cost of at least one life. They set up another facility opposite the railway station in Quorn in 1880.

The partnership between T. F., J. F., and B. F. Mellor was dissolved 5 January 1878, but the business continued to operate under James' and Benjamin's joint ownership.

The company appointed agencies in Victoria, and in 1885 B. F. Mellor and his family moved to Ballarat, Victoria to oversee interstate distribution. In 1888 arrangements were made for McCalman, Garde, & Co. of North Melbourne to manufacture Mellor patent ploughs and scarifiers under licence. J. F. and B. F. Mellor founded a factory at Braybrook Junction, close to Melbourne, cheap coal, bluestone quarries and railway facilities, and near the site of a successful demonstration of their stump-jump plough. The Braybrook Implement Works would later be taken over by H. V. McKay to become the giant Sunshine Harvester Works. J. F. and B. F. Mellor also founded the Meadowbank Implement Works at Meadowbank, New South Wales. In 1892 Benjamin F. Mellor sold up his personal property and settled in Moonee Ponds, Victoria.

Mellor Brothers Cooperative Limited (from 1892 Mellors Cooperative Company Ltd.) was founded 1890 to take over the assets of Mellor Brothers, and shares were sold, principally to farmers and employees. James F. Mellor was appointed chairman of directors. The Kapunda, Jamestown and Quorn assets were transferred to the new company in July 1891, and new depots established at Terowie and Hawker later that same year. Orroroo followed, then Nairne in 1893.

In 1893 a severe recession hit South Australia, coinciding with several bank failures. The company responded by putting employees on half time. In 1894, in the face of continuing losses and mounting bad debts, the company compulsorily acquired shares held by James and Benjamin Mellor, wrote down the asset value of goodwill and patent rights and filed for voluntary liquidation. The disposal of assets was handled by the firm of Bagot, Shakes and Lewis.

=== Swan song of Mellor Brothers ===
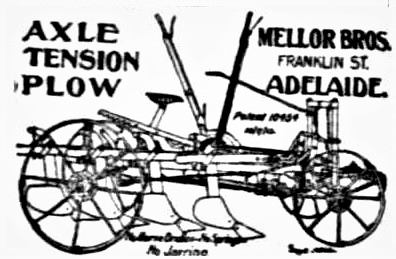
Advertisement for Mellor plough 1914. Note unusual (for Australia) spelling.

James Fox Mellor returned to the factory at 178 Franklin Street and continued to manufacture replacement parts for the old company's products, and to develop improved designs.

Details are hard to find, but it is likely that he purchased much of the old machinery and perhaps one of the old factories at the sort of prices that prevail in hard economic times. His motivations for reopening the old factory are also open to speculation. Driven by pride perhaps; boredom and no other employment maybe; or perhaps providing meaningful employment for the coming generation, something he believed in.

Mellor patented a "clockspring" stump-jumping plough which was well received by the once-again prosperous farming sector, no doubt to the benefit of Mellor and his staff, which now included his two sons. With the advent of petrol-driven tractors, much larger "clockspring" ploughs became practical.

J. F. Mellor died in 1914, and the factory appears to have closed without public explanation or notice. His son A. N. Mellor advertised sale of spare parts from his North Adelaide home

== The brothers ==
The sons of Joseph Mellor may have been educated at J. L. Young's Adelaide Educational Institution, but if so none was mentioned in any of the school's prizegiving ceremonies.

Thomas Fox Mellor (1836 – 24 December 1898) was born in Rastrick, Yorkshire and came to South Australia with his parents as a four-year-old child. Unlike his brothers he had no inclination to things mechanical, and after assisting his father with management duties, severed his connection with the business and settled down to work as a land and estate agent, becoming a member of the Adelaide Stock Exchange. He was an avid draughts player, member of the Independent Order of Odd Fellows and prominent member of the Semaphore Baptist Church. He died at his residence, Paxton Street, Semaphore. The funeral took place on Christmas Day, and his remains were interred in the West Terrace Cemetery.

James Fox Mellor (1841 – 6 April 1914) was born in Adelaide in 1841, and joined his father's business on leaving school. In 1864 he proceeded to Kapunda to manage the factory there, and he lived there 23 years. He was a prominent citizen of the town, and was mayor for three years, and was particularly well known amongst the farming community. He and his brother Benjamin F. Mellor founded the Meadowbank Implement Works in Sydney, and the Braybrook Implement Works at Sunshine, Victoria. He married a daughter of Thomas Neill, accountant for the South Australian Company. He was a prominent member of the Tynte Street Baptist Church, North Adelaide. He died at his residence. Molesworth Street, North Adelaide. After the Mellor Bros. expansion, conversion to a co-operative and collapse, he re-established a similar business under the old name, which ran successfully until a few years before his death.

Benjamin Fox Mellor (1843 – 5 March 1916) was born in Adelaide, and from a young age showed an interest in farming, and applied that knowledge to design and construction of reaping and winnowing machines and other agricultural implements. He took a great interest in religion, and was a member of the Bentham Street Baptist Church in the early days, and later of the Flinders Street Church. He and his family moved to Victoria to manage an implement factory at Braybrook, and retired to live at Moonee Ponds. He married the only daughter of Robert Dawson, of Dublin, South Australia. He died at Newlyn, Victoria while visiting a daughter.

John Fox Mellor (22 February 1845 – 4 May 1913) was born in Adelaide and learned the trade of an ironmoulder, but left the business for farming. He secured a property at The Reedbeds, where he lived for 41 years. He was vitally interested in education and for 31 years was a member of the Thebarton School Board of Advice. The extensive grounds of the Thebarton School were named "The Mellor Playgrounds" in his honour. He was a driving force behind the Society for the Prevention of Cruelty to Animals, a longtime member of the Royal Agricultural and Horticultural Society and the Field Naturalists Society. He did much good work for the Home for Incurables at Fullarton. He was prominently connected the Adelaide Philharmonic Society and was honorary organist to several churches, including the Flinders Street Baptist Church. He was closely associated with the 1893 South Australian tour of the eminent English organist W. H. Jude, and in 1895 was helped found the Jude Benevolent Search Party, a charitable organisation named in his honour. For many years he attended various churches in the Henley Beach area: Methodist, Baptist, Congregational, and Church of Christ. He was a longtime member of the Y.M.C.A. and the Independent Order of Odd Fellows, and the Voluntary Militia. He was a member of the Henley Beach branch of the Liberal Union. He died at his home, "Holmfirth" in Fulham.

Note on Mellor Park There have been two quite separate Adelaide suburbs named "Mellor Park": one, now part of Semaphore Park, subdivided by Thomas F. Mellor in 1879, and the other now part of Lockleys subdivided by John White Mellor (son of John F. Mellor) in 1920.

== Family ==
Thomas Mellor (c. 1782 – 15 March 1855) and Margaret "Peggy" Mellor née Thornton (c. 1784 – 4 April 1853) of Yorkshire. Their family included:

- Joseph Mellor (9 September 1808 – 28 December 1880) married Mary Fox (c. 1808 – 12 December 1873) in 1835. They had a residence in Brown Street or Morphett Street, Adelaide in 1859; then around 1878 at The Semaphore, where he died. They had four sons:

- Thomas Fox Mellor (1836 – 24 December 1898) was born in Rastrick, Yorkshire. He married Eleanor Emma Taylor ( – 1871) on 20 March 1861. He married again, to Sarah Ann Telling (c. 1835 – 10 March 1934) on 5 March 1873.

- Mary Lucretia Mellor (1862– )
- James Taylor Mellor LLB. (1865 – 13 April 1914) married Emma Masterman Adams ( – ) on 26 March 1891, lived at Avenel Gardens, Medindie. Mellor was solicitor with W. & T. Pope, President of the Baptist Union, member of Woodville and Walkerville District councils and delegate to the Tramways Trust.

- Thomas Reginald Mellor OBE (15 January 1893 – 1960) married Dorothy Evelyn Corry in 1919. He served as a Major in the Great War, later Lt.-Colonel and solicitor with W. & T. Pope.

- Minnie Taylor Mellor (1868–1903)

- James Fox Mellor (1841 – 6 April 1914) married Jane Neill (c. 1841 – 28 May 1934) on 2 March 1865, lived at 64 Strangways Terrace, North Adelaide.

- Victoria May Mellor (1867 – 13 April 1949)
- Elizabeth Lillian Mellor (1871 – 12 May 1937) married draper Tom Mellor Broadbent (c. 1871 – 10 April 1943) on 2 December 1895
- Arthur Neill Mellor (10 June 1873 – 20 October 1952) married Lily Emily Yarrow (c. 1877 – 10 May 1906) in 1903; he married again, to Marion Alice Woods in 1909. They lived at 55 Buxton Street, North Adelaide.
- Alfred James Mellor (16 September 1875 – 5 August 1956), born at Carrington Street, Kapunda, married Salome Annie Tubb ( –1965) on 9 April 1904
- Joseph Harold Mellor (1882–1966) married Olive Elsie Philips ( –1972) in 1912. She was the author of Complete Australian Gardener (1952).

- Douglas Harold Sinclair "Doug" Mellor RDA. (1916–1994) He was lecturer in Farm Engineering at Roseworthy Agricultural College

- Jean Thorntom Mellor married Dr. Lewis J. Birch on 13 October 1923, lived in Victoria.

- Benjamin Fox Mellor (1843 – 5 March 1916) married Catherine Lavinia Dawson ( – 16 March 1919) on 29 March 1871, lived at Moonee Ponds; the family all lived in Victoria.

- Edward Albert Dawson Mellor (26 January 1872 – April 1892)
- Franklyn Reginald Mellor (1 May 1875 – 1959) born at Franklin Street
- Bruce Torrens Mellor (11 November 1876 – 1956) born at sea aboard clipper Torrens
- Nellie Theodora Mellor (27 June 1878 – 17 April 1945)
- Elsie Mary Mellor (21 May 1881 – 1965)
- Allan Robert Mellor (7 November 1882 – 1920) married Olive Holthum on 27 June 1919. Olive was an instructor at Burnley Horticultural College.
- Irene Josephine Mellor (6 March 1886 – 1963)
- Roy Keith Mellor (21 January 1891 – 1974)

- John Fox Mellor (22 February 1845 – 4 May 1913) married Eliza White (1 January 1847 – 7 October 1919) on 18 March 1868. Eliza was a daughter of John White (1790 – 30 December 1860), who arrived aboard Tam o'Shanter in December 1836. and purchased a section of the Reedbeds which he named Fulham Farm after the London suburb. The Mellors later took up an adjacent area.

- John White Mellor (10 December 1868 – 10 October 1931) married Elizabeth Maud Elliott ( – 22 August 1951) on 24 September 1913. He was Captain of the Reedbeds Rifle Club, company director, ornithologist, naturalist and collector. Died bankrupt.
- Percival Willingale Mellor (7 February 1875 – 2 June 1943), born at Henley Cottage, Reedbeds lived at Albert Hills
- Stanley Charles Mellor (2 May 1876 – 8 October 1947), lived at Fulham
- Barbara Willingale Mellor (13 March 1878 – 30 August 1934) married Edward Dunham Brooke Nicholls DDS. (11 February 1877 – ) in 1910, lived in Melbourne. He was a noted dentist, naturalist and author
- Charles White Mellor (11 September 1882 – 1970), lived in Wellington, New Zealand.
- Winnifred Mary Mellor (17 January 1885 – 13 November 1916), lived in Fulham, was educated at Miss Jacob's school in North Adelaide, and was an expert birdwatcher. She died suddenly without warning.

- Mary Eva Fox Mellor (1854–1854)

- Elizabeth Walker née Mellor (7 January 1811 – 6 April 1894), and her husband Richard Fisher Walker (died 18 August 1884) and two children
- Nancy Turner née Mellor (c. 1813 – 26 December 1894), and her husband Joshua Turner and their two daughters
- Mary Mellor (9 October 1818 – 23 July 1906) married widower Job Gould Malin (died 1856) in 1843, in 1859 married baker John Lavin, lived in Port Adelaide.

- Sidney Malin (8 March 1851 – 28 January 1920) was mayor of Port Adelaide 1885–1887.

- Delia "Lucy" Mellor (c. 1819 – 9 March 1886) married Daniel George Brock (died 1867) on 24 January 1842.

- Delia Annie Brock (c. 1847 – 2 October 1893) married William Henry Fox Baily in 1871.
