= T. J. Richards & Sons =

Australian coachbuilding company

T. J. Richards & Sons was a coachbuilding company which operated in Australia under various names from 1885 through to 1951.

== T. J. Richards, wheelwright and coachbuilder ==
The history of T. J. Richards & Sons dates from 1885 when Tobias John Martin Richards opened a small coachbuilding shop in Pulteney Street, Adelaide, in partnership with J. W. Fisher, dissolved 1886. Other reports have him operating in the Adelaide suburb of Mitcham.

Richards developed the "King of the Road" two wheeled sulky and also adopted this name as his trade slogan. In 1900 the company moved to new larger premises in Hindmarsh Square in the city of Adelaide. Agencies were established in other Australian locations and exports to overseas countries including England, South Africa and India were undertaken. Richards' coachwork won over 500 awards in various exhibitions.

By 1903, Richards had been joined in the business by three of his sons: Henry Ernest, Claude Alfred Victor and William Egbert. The company produced its first automobile body in 1905 and a dedicated department for this activity was formed in 1912.

== T. J. Richards & Sons ==
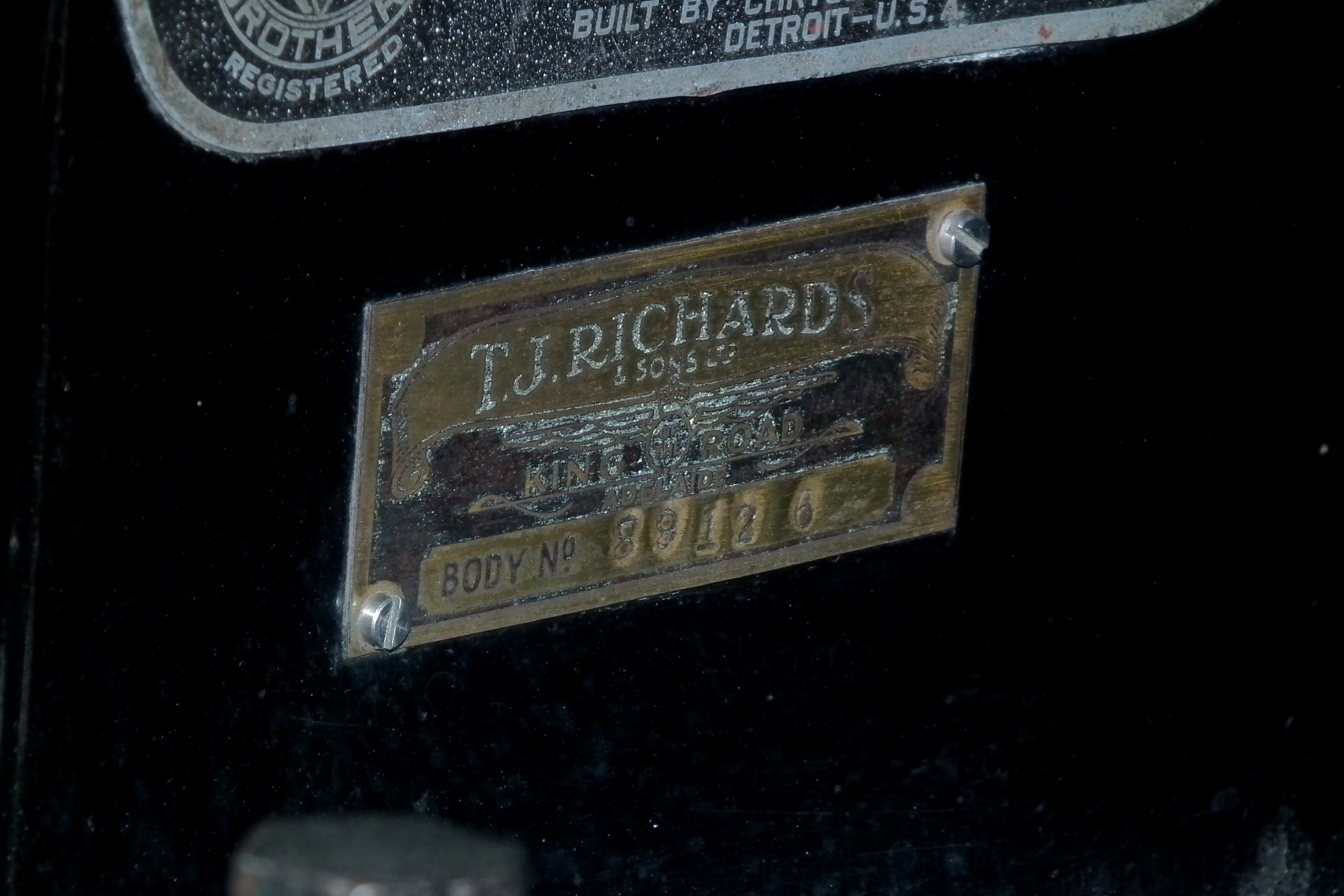
Plate

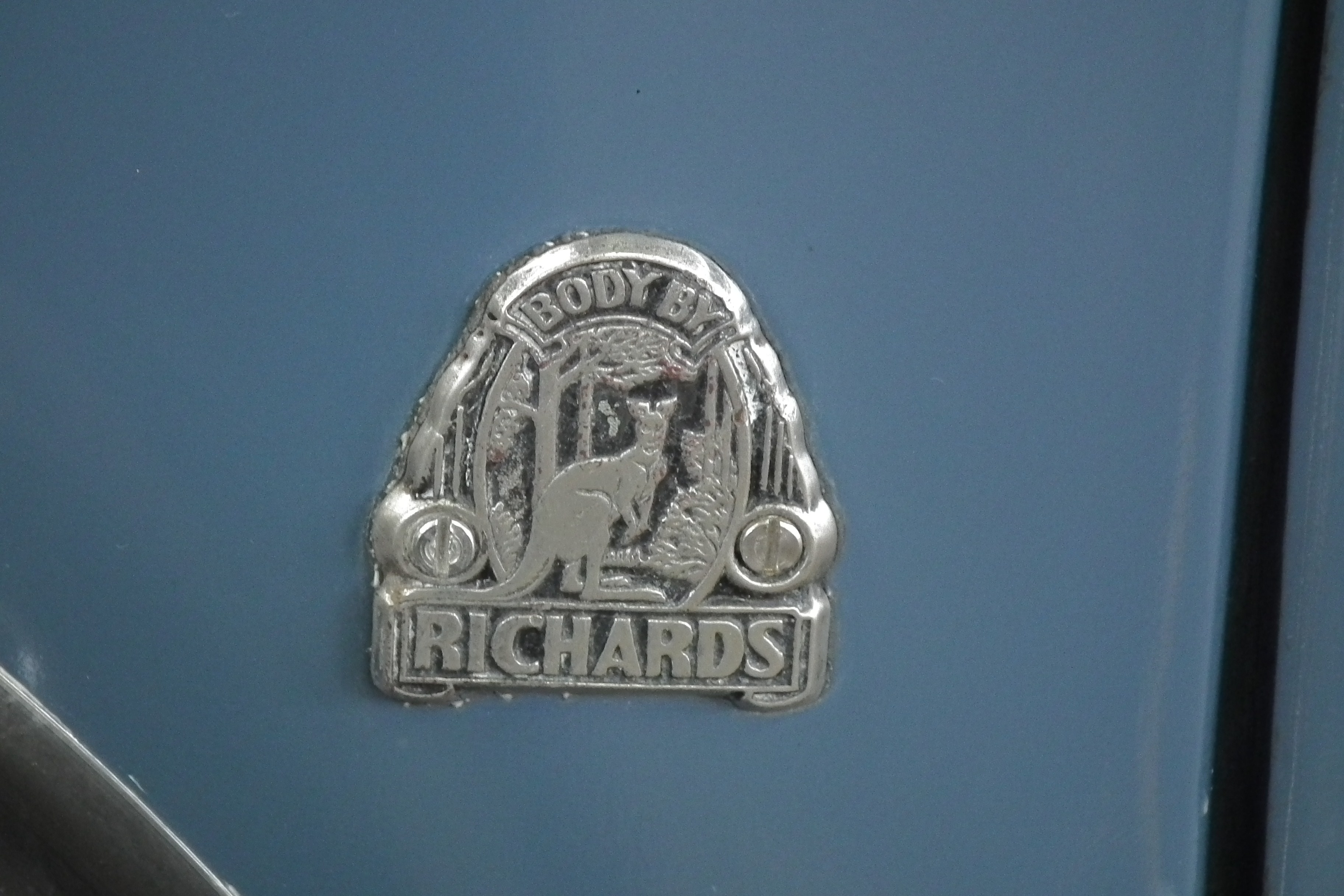
Badge

In 1913, the company name was changed to "T. J. Richards & Sons", Richards having recently handed over the operation of the company to his sons. H. E. (Henry Ernest) Richards died in 1915 after crashing his motorcycle.

In 1920, the company moved again, this time to a 7 1/2-acre site on the corner of Anzac Highway and Leader Street in the Adelaide suburb of Keswick, later Le Cornu's furniture outlet. The first mechanical body press was installed in 1924 and an assembly line was established shortly after this. Bodies were produced for various makes including Bianchi, Citroën, Fiat, Maxwell, Hudson, Oakland, Overland, Armstrong Siddeley, Austin, Hupmobile, Berliet, Durant, Amilcar, Rover and Rolls-Royce.

In 1928, an additional factory was established in the Adelaide suburb of Mile End. In the same year Richards and Sons forged a relationship with the Chrysler Corporation and subsequently the production of bodies for Chrysler, Dodge, DeSoto and Plymouth automobiles became the company's main activity. In 1936, the recently formed Australian company Chrysler Dodge Distributors Limited purchased part of T. J. Richards & Sons, taking a controlling interest the following year.

== Richards Industries ==
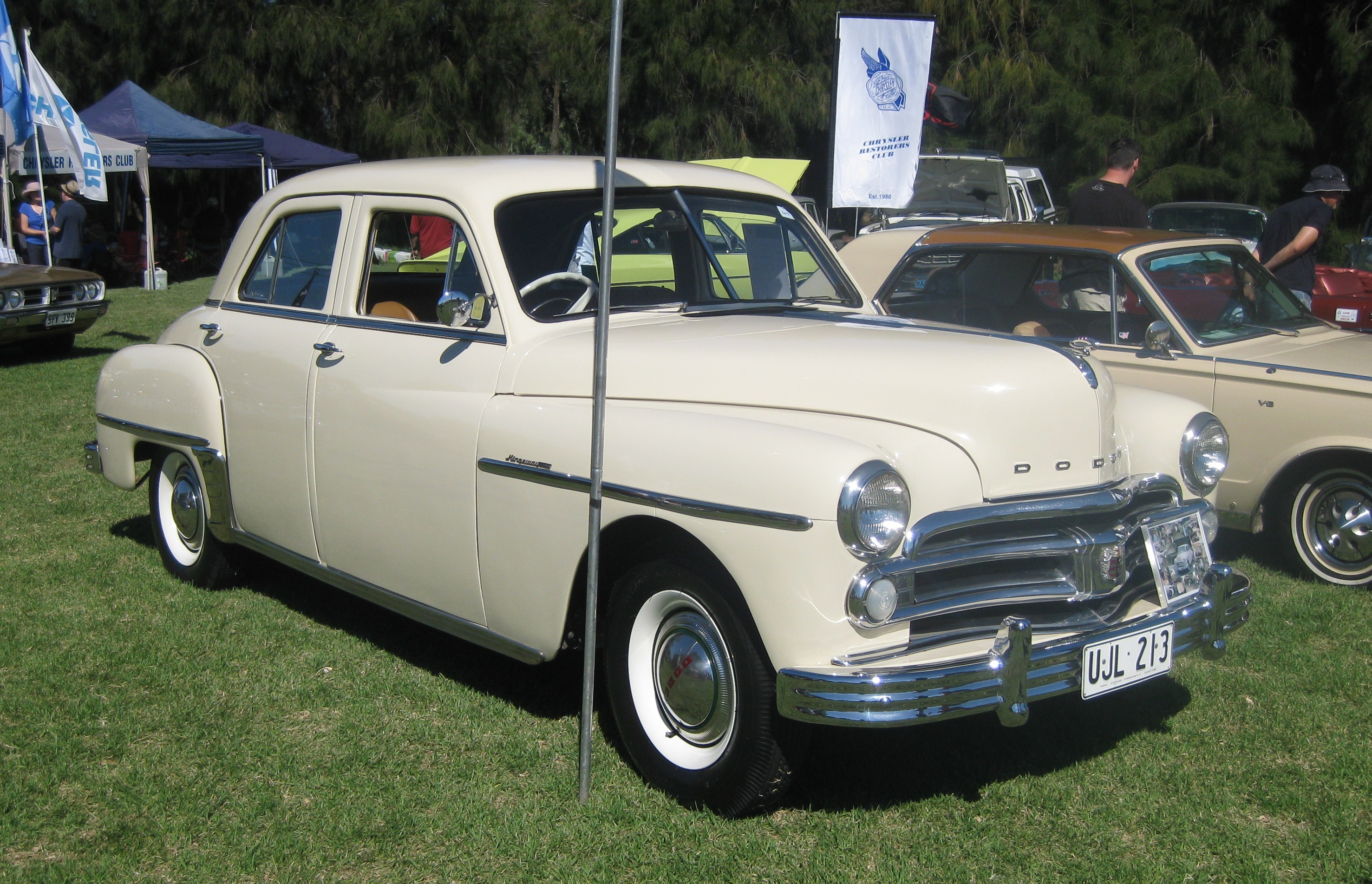
Bodies for the Australian market 1950 Dodge Kingsway were built by Chrysler Dodge DeSoto Distributors Limited

In 1941, T. J. Richards & Sons was renamed to Richards Industries Limited. During World War II, production changed to munitions and aircraft components, with wing panels for the Bristol Beaufort and the CAC Wirraway being the major focus.

== Chrysler Dodge DeSoto Distributors Limited ==
The Richards family sold their remaining stake in the company to Chrysler Dodge Distributors Limited in 1946. The name was changed to Chrysler Dodge DeSoto Distributors Limited and the parent company also changed its name, to Chrysler Dodge Distributors (Holdings) Pty Ltd.

In 1951, the American Chrysler Corporation bought 85% of Chrysler Dodge Distributors (Holdings) Pty Ltd and renamed it Chrysler Australia Ltd.
