= North–South Corridor, Adelaide =

Road route in and beyond Adelaide, South Australia

North–South Corridor South Australia
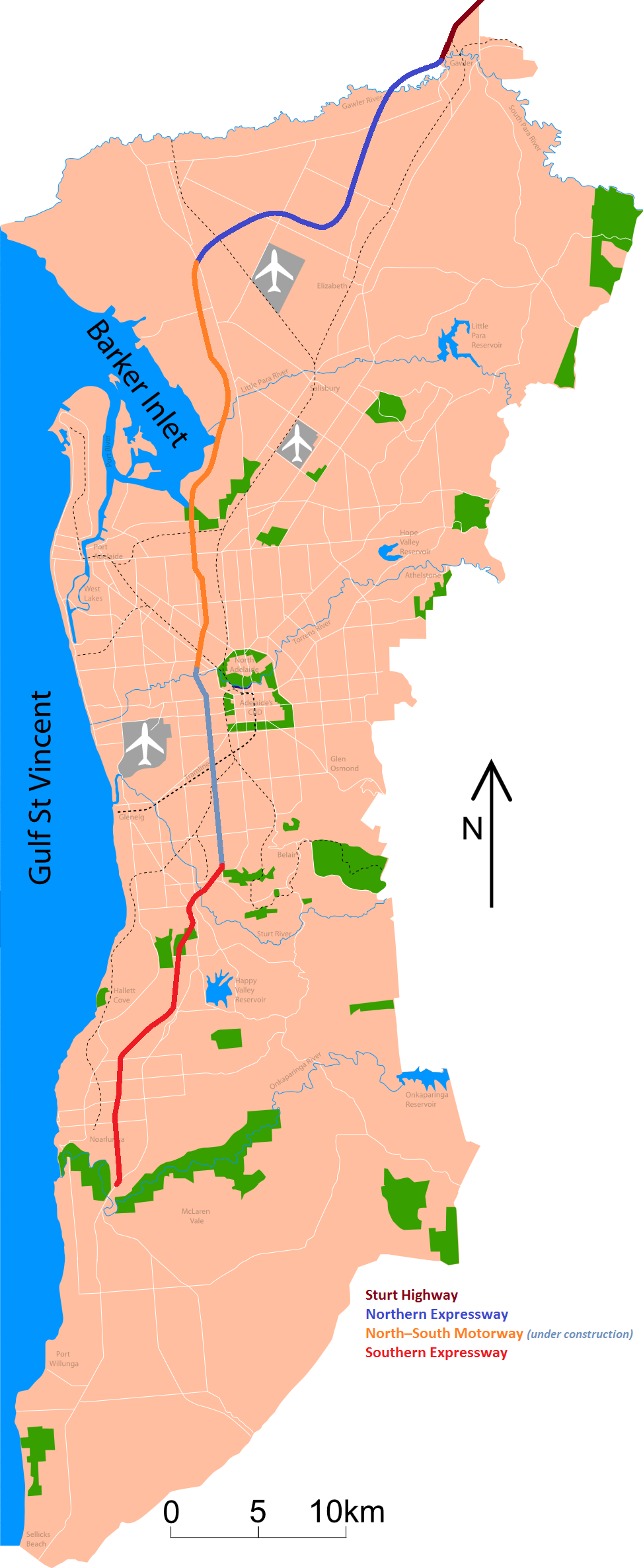
- The North-South Corridor, with the Sturt Highway extension also shown

General information
- Type: Freeway
- Length: 78 km (48 mi)
- Route number(s): M2

Major junctions
- South end: Main South Road; Old Noarlunga, Adelaide
- North end: Gawler Bypass Road; Gawler, South Australia

Location(s)
- Major suburbs / towns: Bedford Park, Black Forest, Glandore, Angle Park, Globe Derby Park, Bolivar, Waterloo Corner, Virginia, Penfield, Andrews Farm, Angle Vale, Gawler

Highway system
- Highways in Australia; National Highway • Freeways in Australia; Highways in South Australia

The North–South Corridor is a series of component motorways travelling through Adelaide, South Australia that will eventually form a continuous link from Old Noarlunga in the outer southern metropolitan Adelaide suburbs through to Gawler in northern metropolitan Adelaide, comprising a distance of 78km. Under South Australia's road route system, the corridor is signed as route M2.

Comprising the Northern Expressway, the North–South Motorway and the Southern Expressway, parts of the corridor are still under construction, with the project aiming for completion by 2031.

== Component motorways ==
By 2031, all of these major road links are proposed to have been completed, thus making a major route through the Adelaide metropolitan area a much more efficient way to travel. Its expected to take only one hour to travel from Noarlunga in the South to Gawler in the North. When announced, the incumbent government had a strategy to deliver the complete project in ten years from May 2015.

The components identified by the Department of Planning, Transport and Infrastructure, from north to south, are:

Section	Status	Opened
Northern Expressway
Northern Expressway	Complete	13 September 2010
North–South Motorway
Northern Connector	Complete	7 March 2020
South Road Superway	Complete	13 March 2014
Regency Road to Pym Street	Complete	30 March 2021
Torrens Road to River Torrens	Complete	29 September 2018
River Torrens to Darlington	Under construction	TBA
Southern Expressway
Darlington Upgrade	Complete	1 August 2020
Duplication	Complete	3 August 2014

=== Northern Expressway ===
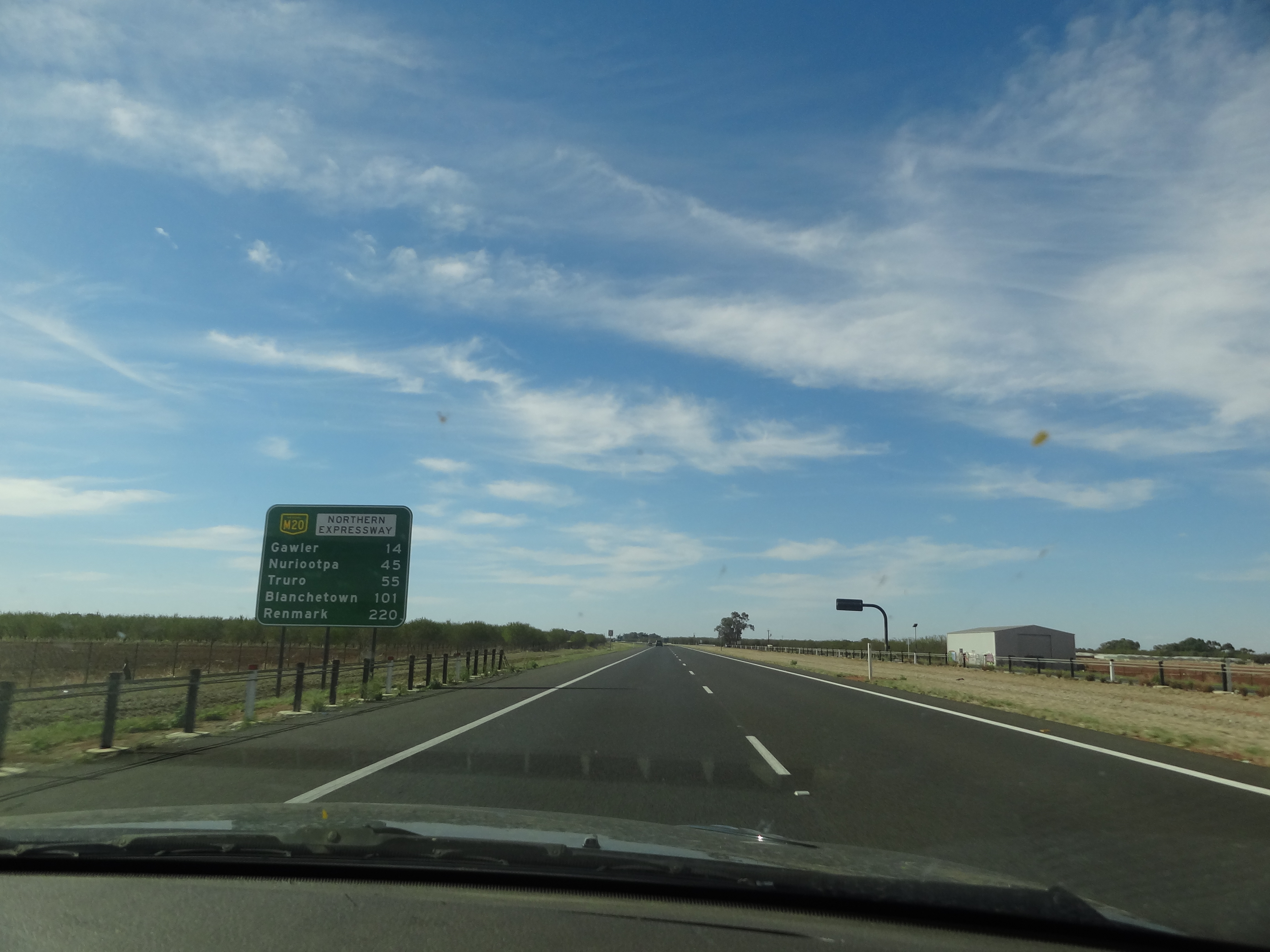
The Northern Expressway, heading north-east towards Gawler in April 2012

The Northern Expressway opened in September 2010 and was named the Max Fatchen Expressway, as the longest new road project in South Australia for a number of decades. Max Fatchen was a popular author and journalist who had grown up and lived most of his life in the area traversed by the expressway. The 4 lane highway extends from Port Wakefield Road, northwest through 5 interchanges in Penfield (2 interchanges), Andrews Farm, Angle Vale and Gawler River to where it joins the Sturt Highway just outside Gawler.

Cycling is prohibited on the expressway. The Stuart O'Grady Bikeway was constructed in conjunction with the expressway and follows the southeastern side of it.

=== North–South Motorway ===
The North–South Motorway is an incomplete planned motorway traversing the inner western suburbs of Adelaide from Waterloo Corner and Virginia in the north to Bedford Park in the south. As a free-flowing north-south route it will be the primary route through Adelaide, bypassing the traffic light intersections along Port Wakefield Road and South Road, and will connect the Northern Expressway and Southern Expressway.

For the purposes of construction planning, the motorway was divided into sections which have been progressively constructed since 2010. As of March 2025, approximately 24.1 kilometres (15.0 mi) of the motorway has been completed with the remaining 10.5 kilometres (6.5 mi) currently under construction.

=== Southern Expressway ===
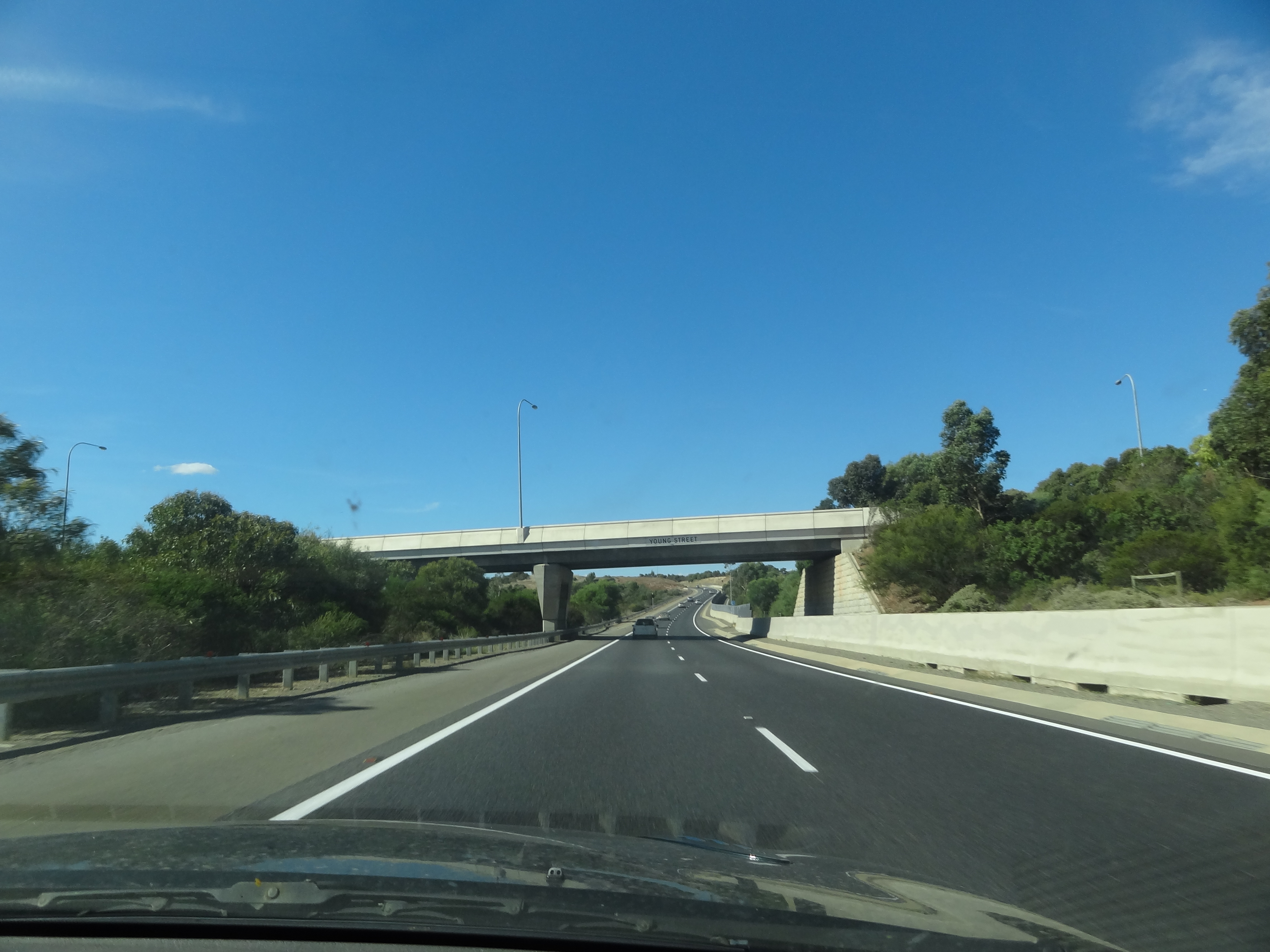
The Southern Expressway, heading north, before going under the Young Street Bridge in April 2012

The Southern Expressway opened in two stages in 1997 and 2001 respectively, as a one way freeway which was closed for an hour twice a day, and reversed direction to match peak traffic flow. It was open northwards, towards the city, on weekday mornings and weekend afternoons. It was open southwards, away from the city, on weekday afternoons and weekend mornings. Duplication of the expressway began in 2011, with the construction of a second carriageway allowing the expressway to operate in both directions at all hours. The duplication opened in August 2014.

The northern terminus of the expressway is at South Road in St Marys, where it runs through Bedford Park in an open cutting adjacent to Main South Road on the surface. This section began construction in 2016 and opened in 2020, replacing the original northern terminus, a signalised intersection further south, and bypassing five sets of traffic lights on Main South Road.

The southern terminus of the expressway is at Main South Road, Old Noarlunga. Northbound traffic has free-flowing entry onto the roadway. Southbound travellers have a set of traffic lights to exit the expressway. Heading south after the expressway, Victor Harbor can be accessed with one additional set of traffic lights, while traffic to Cape Jervis encounters three more sets of lights.

== Sturt Highway extension ==
The Gawler Bypass extends the continuous motorway at the northern end of the Corridor to the Sturt Highway at Hewett. Beyond Hewett, the Sturt Highway has been built to dual carriageway standards until Nuriootpa. The second carriageway was added between 2007 and 2009, providing a total of two lanes in each direction. The Sturt Highway continues beyond Nuriootpa as just one lane each way. The next major bottleneck is the town of Truro, which has the highway as its main street. A bypass is proposed in 5 to 15 years from the 2015 integrated plan.
