= Penfield =

Penfield may refer to:

== Places ==
=== United States ===
- Penfield, Georgia, an unincorporated community
- Penfield, Illinois, a census-designated place
- Penfield, New York, a town
- Penfield Township, Lorain County, Ohio
- Penfield, Pennsylvania, an unincorporated community
- Penfield, Haverford Township, Pennsylvania, an unincorporated community
- Penfield Reef, extending from Fairfield, Connecticut to Long Island Sound

=== Australia ===
- Penfield, South Australia, a suburb of Adelaide

== Education ==
- Penfield Academy, Quebec, Canada, a former school
- Penfield Central School District, New York
- Penfield High School, Penfield, New York

== People ==
- Penfield (surname), a list of people with the name
- Penfield Tate II (born 1931), the first and only black mayor of Boulder, Colorado
- Penfield Tate III (born 1956), American politician and lawyer

== Transportation ==
- Penfield railway line, Adelaide, South Australia
  - Penfield 1 railway station
  - Penfield 2 railway station
  - Penfield 3 railway station
- Penfield station (SEPTA), in Haverford Township, Pennsylvania

== Other uses ==
- Doctor Penfield Avenue, Montreal
- Louis Penfield House, Ohio, built by Frank Lloyd Wright
- Penfield Library, State University of New York at Oswego
- Penfield Outdoor Apparel, a Massachusetts clothing company

== See also ==
- Penfield homunculus, a distorted representation of the human body
- Prix Wilder-Penfield, an award for biomedicine research
- Pinfield, a surname
