= Elizabeth railway station, Adelaide =

Railway station in Adelaide, South Australia

Elizabeth
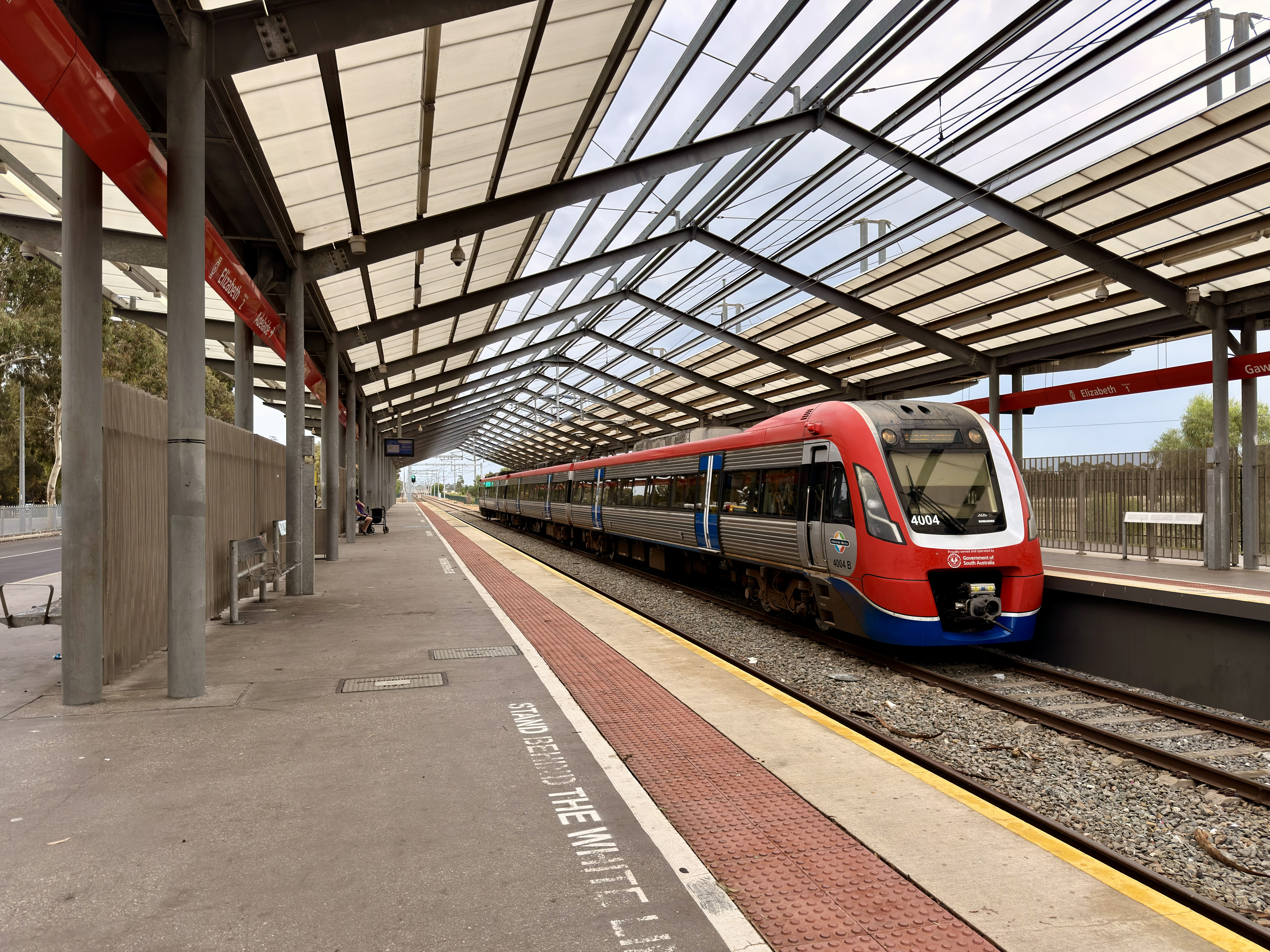
- Southbound view from Platform 2, April 2026

General information
- Location: Mountbatten Square, Elizabeth
- Coordinates: 34°43′02″S 138°39′53″E
- System: Railway station and bus interchange
- Owner: Department for Infrastructure & Transport
- Operator: Adelaide Metro
- Line: Gawler
- Distance: 25.8 km from Adelaide
- Platforms: 2
- Tracks: 2
- Connections: Bus

Construction
- Structure type: Ground
- Parking: Yes
- Cycle facilities: Yes
- Accessible: Yes

Other information
- Station code: 16512 (to City); 18551 (to Gawler Central)
- Website: Adelaide Metro

History
- Opened: 1960
- Rebuilt: 1999 & 2012

Services
Preceding station	Adelaide Metro	Following station
Elizabeth South towards Adelaide	Gawler line	Womma towards Gawler Central
Salisbury towards Adelaide	Gawler line Super Express	Smithfield towards Gawler Central
Location

Elizabeth railway station is located on the Gawler line. Situated on the border of the northern Adelaide suburbs of Elizabeth and Edinburgh, it is 25.8 kilometres (16.0 mi) from Adelaide station.

== History ==
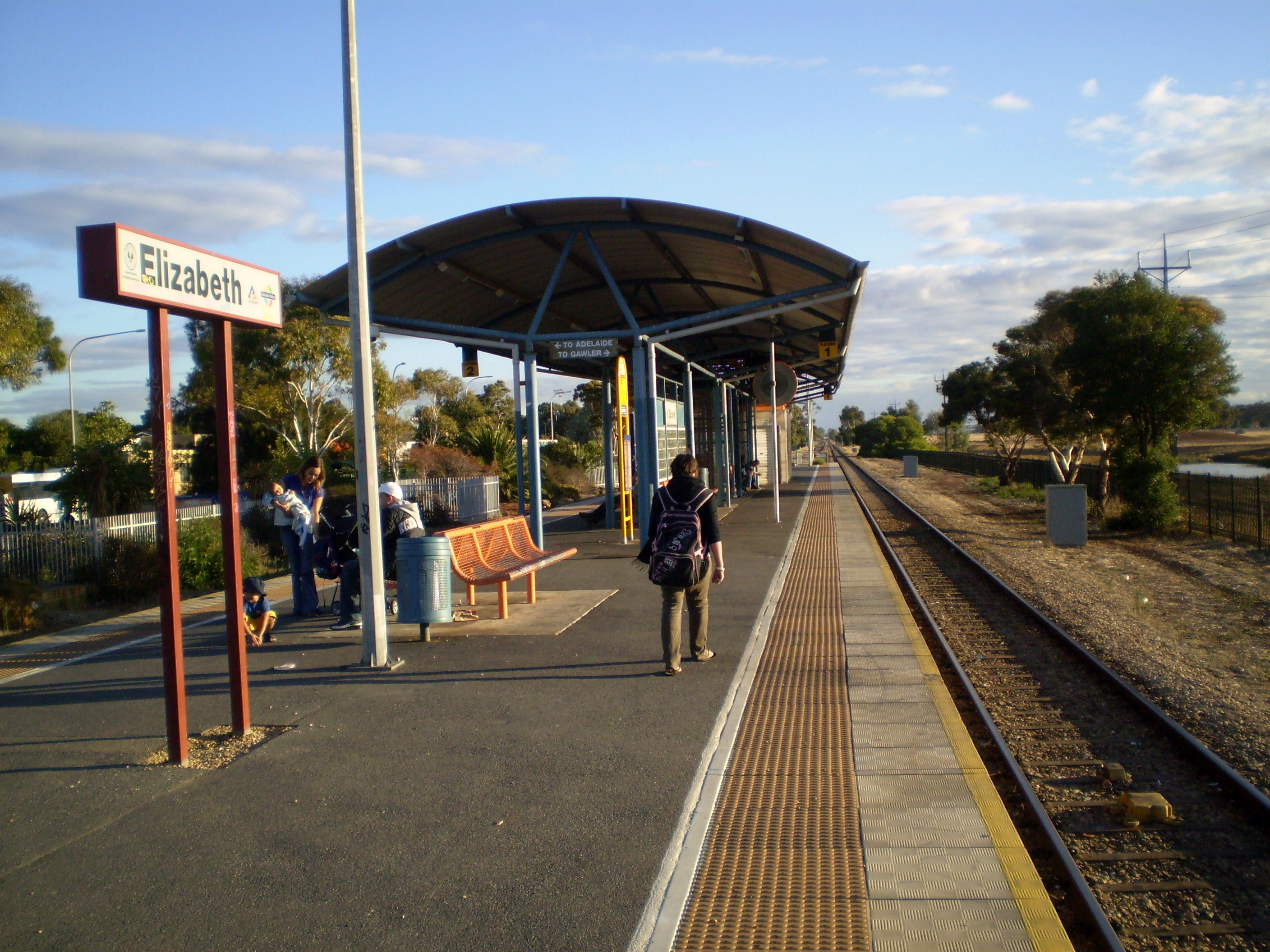
The rebuilt 1999 island platform at Elizabeth station in 2008

The township of Elizabeth was established in 1955, with Elizabeth South railway station the first to be constructed in the area. Elizabeth station opened on June 27 1960 in anticipation of increased demand from the nearby town centre and shopping district opening later in 1960. The station was first rebuilt in 1999 with one island platform and shelter, which was accessible by an underground pedestrian subway.

In July 2011, the station was demolished and rebuilt as part of a $40 million station upgrade project. Approximately $15 million was allocated for a complete rebuild of Elizabeth Station, including construction of two new side platforms, a pedestrian overpass, and a bus interchange facility. In anticipation of increasing passenger numbers on the Gawler line, an additional $12 million was budgeted to construct a rail turnback facility north of Elizabeth station, allowing trains to terminate at Elizabeth and return to Adelaide, or remain stabled at Elizabeth. The revamped station officially opened in April 2012. As of 2023, the turnback facility at Elizabeth is yet to be used as part of a timetabled service. During the October 3-6 2025 long weekend, a railway occupation at Broadmeadows Station to install new water infrastructure required terminating services at Elizabeth and using the turnback facility for timetabled services over the course of that weekend.

Infrastructure Australia had previously identified Elizabeth as a terminus station for services operated by electric trains. Under the proposal, the Gawler line would be electrified between Adelaide and Elizabeth, with diesel 3000 class railcars used to service stations beyond Elizabeth. In July 2018, this proposal, along with a similar proposal for Salisbury railway station, was officially dropped in favour of full electrification.

== Platforms and Services ==
Elizabeth has two side platforms and is serviced by Adelaide Metro Gawler line services. It is a designated high-frequency station, with trains scheduled every 15 minutes on weekdays, between 7:30am and 6:30pm. The western platform is accessible only via an overpass from platform 1. There is a pedestrian level crossing on the southern end of the platform to maintain accessibility in the event of an lift outage, or other emergency.

Platform	Destination
1	Gawler and Gawler Central
2	Adelaide

== Transport links ==
Bus transfers: Stop Stand A (Elizabeth Station)
Route no.	Destination & route details
440	Munno Para station via Smithfield Interchange & Hamblyn Road
441	Smithfield Interchange via Yorktown Road
442	Smithfield Interchange via Blair Park Drive
443	Elizabeth North Loop via Smithfield Interchange & Munno Para Loop
472	Smithfield Interchange to Roma Mitchell Secondary College via Yorktown Road & Main North Road; School service, operates school days only

Bus transfers: Stop Stand B (Elizabeth Station)
Route no.	Destination & route details
451	Munno Para Shopping Centre via Andrews Farm, Davoren Park & Smithfield Interchange and Curtis Road
452	Munno Para Shopping Centre via Mark Oliphant College
900	Salisbury Interchange via Peachey Road, Virginia & Waterloo Corner Road

Bus transfers: Stop Stand C (Elizabeth Station)
Route no.	Destination & route details
224	Elizabeth Interchange to City via Philip Highway, Lyell McEwin Hospital, Salisbury, Salisbury Highway, Mawson Lakes, Main North Road & O'Connell Street
224F	Elizabeth Interchange to City via Philip Highway, Lyell McEwin Hospital, Salisbury Interchange, Salisbury Highway, Mawson Interchange & Main North Road; Limited stop service, operates Monday - Friday excluding public holidays
224M	Elizabeth Interchange to Mawson Interchange via Philip Highway, Lyell McEwin Hospital, Salisbury Interchange, Salisbury Highway & Mawson Interchange; Terminates at Mawson Interchange
224X	Elizabeth Interchange to City via Philip Highway, Lyell McEwin Hospital, Salisbury Interchange, Salisbury Highway & Mawson Interchange then express from stop 29 Main North Road to Gepps Cross to stop 4 O'Connell Street, North Adelaide; Operates Monday - Friday excluding public holidays
400	Salisbury North via Salisbury Interchange
430	Salisbury Interchange & Main North Road
477	Elizabeth Interchange to Saint Dominics School; School service, operates school days only
482	Elizabeth Interchange to Roma Mitchell Secondary College via Elizabeth South, Elizabeth Vale, Salisbury, Parafield Gardens, Green Fields, Mawson Lakes & Pooraka; School service, operates school days only
486	Elizabeth to Gawler via Smithfield Interchange; School service, operates school days only
500	City via Salisbury Interchange, Bridge Road & O-Bahn; Transit Link limited stop service
560	Elizabeth Interchange to Tea Tree Plaza Interchange via Haydown Road, Lyell McEwin Hospital, Salisbury, Bridge Road & Montague Road
560A	Elizabeth Interchange/Ingle Farm to Salisbury Interchange via Philip Highway & Salisbury Highway
949	Elizabeth to Adelaide Secondary School of English via Salisbury, Pooraka & Blair Athol; School service, operates school days only
GA1	Gawler rail replacement service to City via Main North Road
GA2	Gawler rail replacement service to City via Main North Road; Limited stop service
GA3	Gawler rail replacement service to City via Northern Expressway; Limited stop service
J1	Glenelg via Lyell McEwin Hospital, Golden Grove Interchange, Tea Tree Plaza, Paradise, Klemzig, City, Sir Donald Bradman Drive, Adelaide Airport & Harbour Town
J1A	Adelaide Airport via Lyell McEwin Hospital, Golden Grove Interchange, Tea Tree Plaza, Paradise, Klemzig, City & Sir Donald Bradman Drive

== Gallery ==
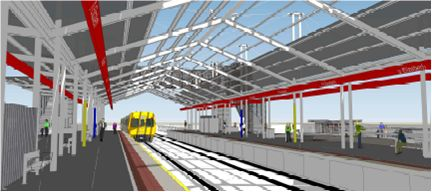
Artist's impression of the new station

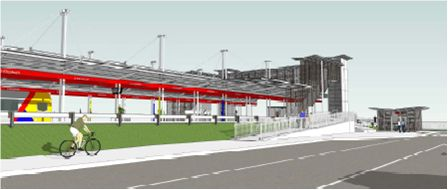
Artist's impression of the new station

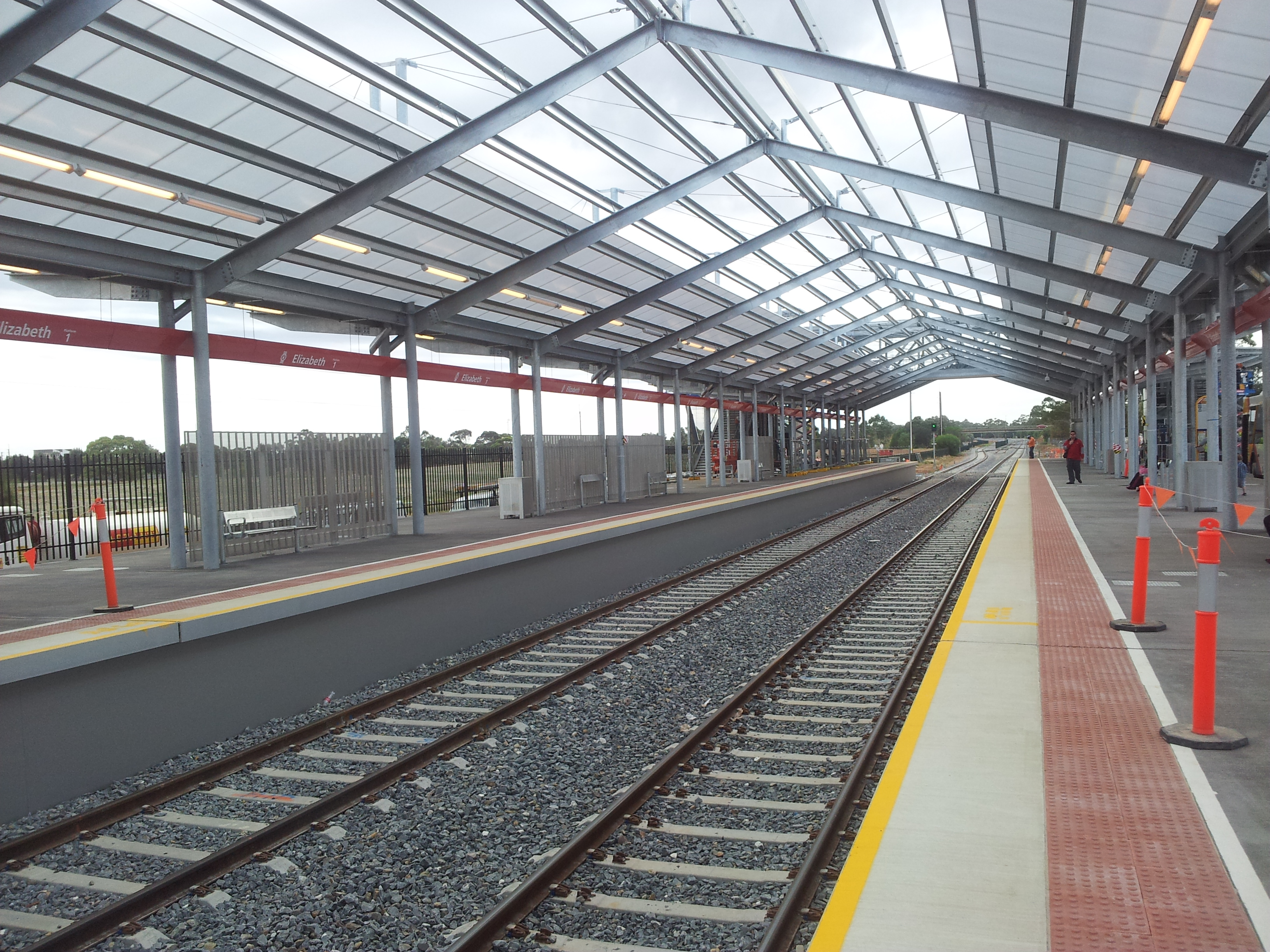
The new Elizabeth station in 2012
