= Penfield, South Australia =

Penfield
- Suburb
- Coordinates: 34.68335°S 138.62259°E
- Country: Australia
- State: South Australia
- City: Adelaide
- LGA: City of Playford

Government
  - State electorate: Taylor
  - Federal division: Spence

Population
  - Total: 422 (SAL 2021)
- Postcode: 5121
Suburbs around Penfield
Penfield Gardens	MacDonald Park	Eyre
Virginia	Penfield	Edinburgh North
Waterloo Corner	Direk	Edinburgh

Penfield is a northern suburb of Adelaide, South Australia, in the City of Playford.

William Penfold, one of the first settlers in the area, subdivided land he had bought in the Hundred of Munno Para in 1856 to create the township of Penfield. The area was commonly known as Peachey Belt or Peachy Belt. The boundaries have changed over the years, the original township being overshadowed by the government acquisition of land immediately south of the early town centre since the 1940s for construction of military facilities such as the Penfield munitions factory. As a result, much of the modern peri-urban locality of Penfield is used for industrial purposes rather than residential and the original town centre is no longer a population centre.

The remaining part of the Zoar Bible Christian Church, built in 1855, is the small cemetery.

== History ==
Before European settlement, the Kaurna people inhabited the land.

In 1833, in the Hundred of Munno Para, Peter Peachey, a surveyor, showed interest in South Australia. Noted in Robert Gouger's journal from December of that year, Peachey expressed his desire to be among the initial settlers. This aligns with the period when plans for colonizing South Australia were taking shape in London. Later, Peachey worked as an overseer on Parnaroo station under his uncle George Williams' ownership. His contributions are further documented in John Lewis' book 'Fought and Won.'

The district was surveyed in 1849, as part of the Hundred of Munno Para. Early settlers arrived in the area in the 1850s, clearing the land to grow cereal crops and graze animals. William Friend Penfold was one of the first to buy land there, and in 1853 he opened the Plough and Harrow Hotel (which closed in 1893 and was destroyed by fire in 1899). In 1856 he subdivided land he had bought on section 4057, and a village was laid out at the junction of Penfield and Argent Roads (the Argents being another family of early settlers). That intersection is now surrounded on three sides by RAAF Base Edinburgh.

Most of the settlers were converted over to the Bible Christian Church (a Methodist denomination) by Reverend Samuel Keen of Angle Vale. The Zoar Bible Christian Church was built in 1855, which was demolished in 1956, although the small cemetery remains. (It is near the Max Fatchen Expressway, accessed from Argent Road or the Stuart O'Grady Bikeway.)

In the early years, the village had two general stores, a police station, the church and the hotel. Penfield Post Office opened around 1856 and closed in 1951. A government school was opened in 1874 and remained open until about 1940. Another church, Sturton Primitive Methodist Church was further south, and the building still stands in the RAAF property, visible from Sturton Road.

Two possibilities as to the origin of the area's former name, Peachey (or Peachy) Belt, which persisted until 1858, have been suggested: that it came from the native peach trees, or quandongs, which covered the area; or that the surveyor was Peter Peachey and the name came from him.

A report in The Register on 10 November 1859, from a meeting in Peachey Belt, mentions a dinner given by James Philcox (a land speculator who named Evanston) at "Smidt's Hotel" before his departure from the colony in 1853. It is not clear whether this referred to the Plough and Harrow or another hotel in the wider area. The report says that Philcox had urged his 13 tenants to turn their attention to the cultivation of vineyards.

In September 1940, with the onset of World War Two, the Commonwealth Government compulsorily acquired a large percentage of land at Penfield leading to the re-development of the area to build an explosives and filling factory known as the Salisbury explosives factory, a section of the district eventually being renamed to Edinburgh, South Australia. The Government paid a low price for the land, between £10 and £14 per acre at the time, causing conflict between the government and landowners. However, the importance of the war overruled the landowners' objections, and the farming families were evicted from their land, leading to the destruction of the township of Penfield. After the war, the munitions factory at Salisbury was repurposed as laboratories for the Woomera Range, originally known as the Long Range Weapons Establishment (LRWE), initially Britain's vulnerability to attack by the new ballistic missile technology became apparent in the latter stages of World War II when German V2 rockets were launched from The Hague in Holland and directed on to London, The (LRWE) initially transitioned into the Weapons Research Establishment (WRE), it eventually became the Defence Science and Technology Organisation (DSTO). The Edinburgh Airfield was opened in 1954, following the decision that the Mallala airport was no longer practical.

== 21st century ==
The boundaries have varied several times before the current precise boundaries were set.

In the 2010s, the eastern part of what was then Penfield was developed for residential housing. On 31 October 2017, this section was excised from Penfield and a new suburb of Eyre was created on the north side of Womma Road and western side of Stebonheath Road.

The western part is mostly an industrial area wrapped around the northern sides of RAAF Base Edinburgh and south of the Max Fatchen Expressway. It includes an intermodal freight terminal on the Adelaide-Port Augusta railway line operated by SCT Logistics with a large warehouse and distribution centre operated for Treasury Wine Estates.

== See also ==
- Penfield railway line serviced the area that is now Edinburgh, initially the World War II munitions factory.
  - Penfield 1 railway station
  - Penfield 2 railway station
  - Penfield 3 railway station
- Penfield (disambiguation)
