= Smithfield railway station =

Railway station in Adelaide, South Australia

Smithfield
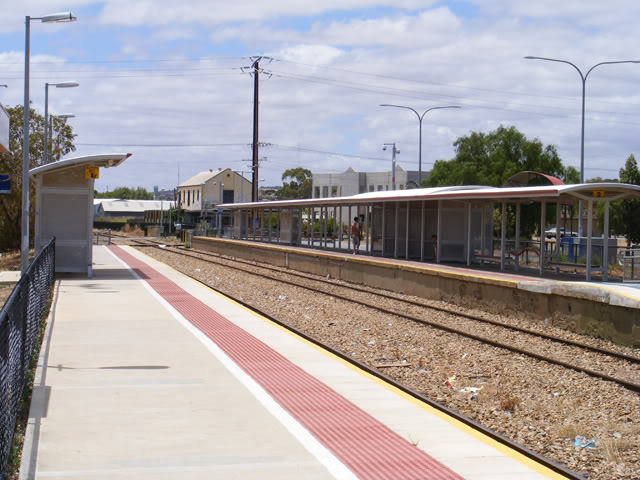
- Northbound view from Platform 1, January 2008

General information
- Location: Anderson Walk, Smithfield
- Coordinates: 34°40′56″S 138°41′12″E
- System: Railway station and bus interchange
- Owner: Department for Infrastructure & Transport
- Operator: Adelaide Metro
- Line: Gawler
- Distance: 30.2 km from Adelaide
- Platforms: 2
- Tracks: 2
- Connections: Bus

Construction
- Structure type: Ground
- Parking: Yes
- Cycle facilities: Yes
- Accessible: Yes

Other information
- Station code: 16561 (to City); 18554 (to Gawler Central)
- Website: Adelaide Metro

History
- Opened: 1 June 1857
- Rebuilt: 2001

Services
Preceding station	Adelaide Metro	Following station
Broadmeadows towards Adelaide	Gawler line	Munno Para towards Gawler Central
Elizabeth towards Adelaide	Gawler line Super Express	Gawler towards Gawler Central
Location

Smithfield railway station is a railway station and bus interchange in the northern Adelaide suburb of Smithfield. It is located on the Gawler line, 30.2 kilometres (18.8 mi) from Adelaide station.

== History ==
Smithfield station opened on Monday 1st June 1857 as the original terminus of the main north line, before the line was extended in October to Gawler. There was originally 6 services a day - 3 Up and 3 Down each, scheduled 4 hours apart, to and from Adelaide with stations also located at North Adelaide, Grand Junction, Dry Creek and Salisbury. A station building and ticket office of the same design as those at North Adelaide station built in 1856 were provided. A short branch line running almost due west to the Smithfield munitions storage depot was built during World War II. This branch line was closed around 1961 when part of the depot was closed and the land sold for subdivision.

The original station building and ticket office was demolished in June 1987. By that time, the station building had been heavily vandalised. Station shelters like the ones at Dry Creek were installed, and these remained until a new station shelter was erected in 2001. At the same time, the western platform was upgraded.

== Platforms and Services ==
Smithfield has two side platforms and is serviced by Adelaide Metro. It is a designated high-frequency station, with trains scheduled every 15 minutes on weekdays, between 7:30am and 6:30pm.

Platform	Destination
1	Gawler and Gawler Central
2	Adelaide

== Bus routes ==
Bus transfers: Stop Zone A (Smithfield Interchange)
Route no.	Destination & route details
228	City via Midway Rd and Main North Rd (228F no pick up from Stop 16 to Stop 3) (228X express from Stop 29 to Stop 4) (T228 Limited stop service)
440	Munno Para via Carcoola Road
443	Elizabeth Interchange Loop via Turner Dr, Blair Park Dr, and Craigmore Rd (Hail 'n' Ride service)
451	Elizabeth Interchange via President Ave and Fordingbridge Rd (451A terminates at Stop 74A Edgecombe Rd, Davoren Park)
452	Elizabeth Interchange via Newton Blvd, Heytesbury Rd, and Mark Oliphant College (452W terminates at Stop 71 Heytsbury Rd, Davoren Park)
461	Munno Para West via Newton Blvd, Brandis Ave, and Mark Oliphant College
462	Angle Vale via Curtis Road (462C runs via Mark Oliphant College and St Columba College)

Bus transfers: Stop Zone B (Smithfield Interchange)
Route no.	Destination & route details
440	Elizabeth Interchange via Hamblynn Rd and Woodford Rd
441	Elizabeth Interchange via Uley Rd, Hanson Rd, Campbell Rd, and Yorktown Rd
442	Elizabeth Interchange via Uley Rd, Park Lake Bvd, Blair Park Dr, and Turner Dr
451	Munno Para Centre Interchange via Warooka Dr
452	Munno Para Centre Interchange via Warooka Dr
461	Munno Para Centre Interchange via Warooka Dr
462	Munno Para Centre Interchange via Warooka Dr (462C follows the same route)
