= Penfield 3 railway station =

Former railway station in South Australia, Australia

Coordinates: 34°43′03″S 138°38′52″E

Penfield 3
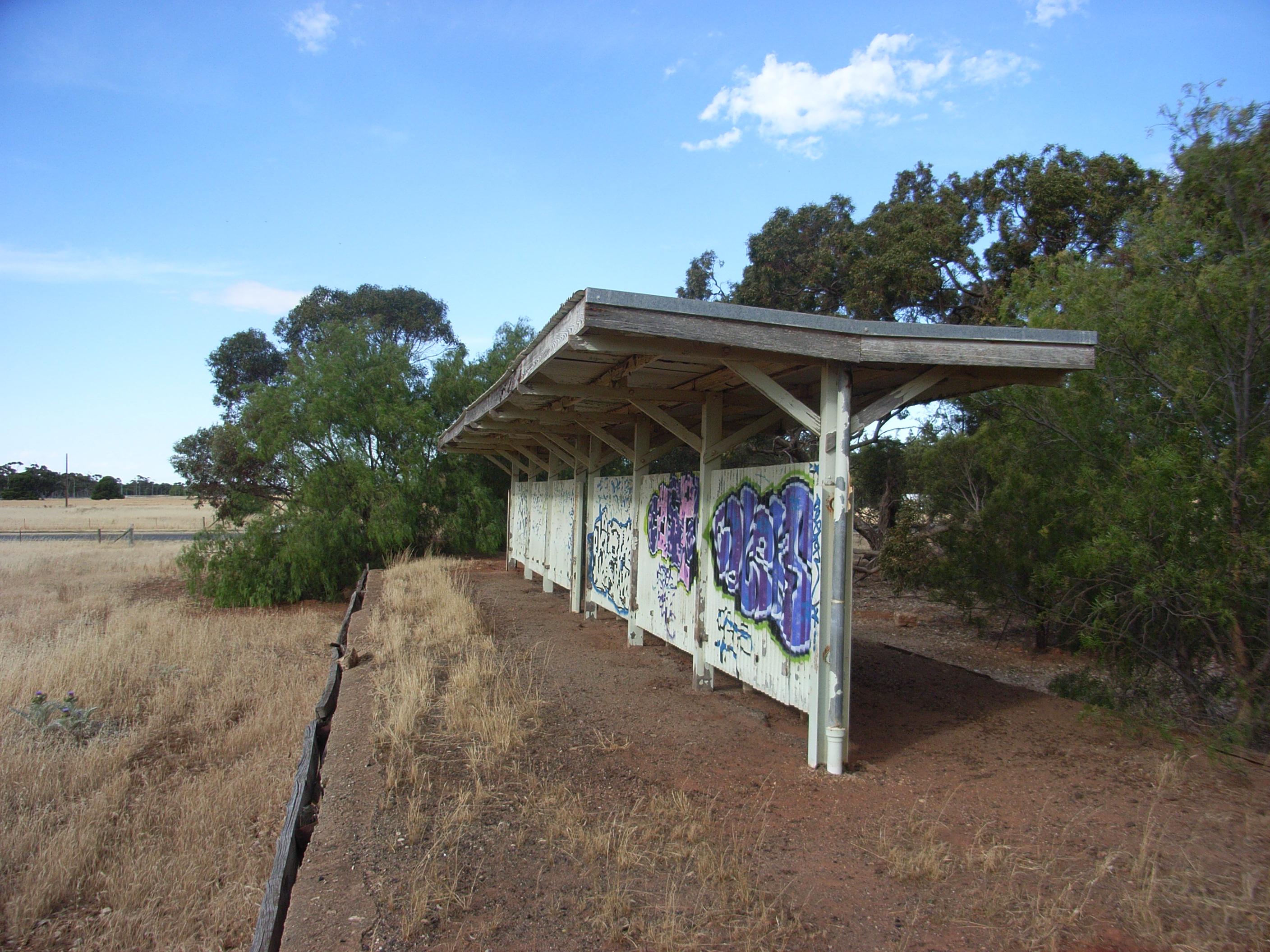

General information
- Location: Taranaki Road; Edinburgh
- Line: Penfield line
- Distance: 25.8 km from Adelaide
- Platforms: 2
- Bus routes: n/a

Construction
- Parking: n/a
- Cycle facilities: n/a

History
- Opened: 1940s
- Closed: circa 1990

Services
Preceding station	Disused railways	Following station
Penfield 2	Penfield line	Terminus
Location

Penfield 3 railway station was located on the Penfield line 25.8 kilometres (16.0 miles) from Adelaide station in the northern Adelaide suburb which is now called Edinburgh. It was built to service the Salisbury Explosives Factory, built between November 1940 and November 1941.

Its remains are located opposite the eastern entrance to RAAF Base Edinburgh between East and West Avenues, south of Taranaki Road.

It closed between 1988 and 1990, just before the Penfield line was closed and dismantled in 1991. The station sign and most seats, the track and some of the platform are now gone. The deteriorating canopy and the eroding remains of some of the platform, surrounded by trees are all that remain of the station today.

Penfield 3 is the only station remaining from the line — Hilra was demolished in the 1980s, and Penfield 1 and Penfield 2 in the late 1990s. Penfield 3 is still accessible from Taranki Road, albeit behind a 1200mm fence designed to keep sheep off the surrounding roads.
