= Northern Expressway =

Freeway in Adelaide, South Australia

Northern Expressway Fatchen Northern Expressway South Australia
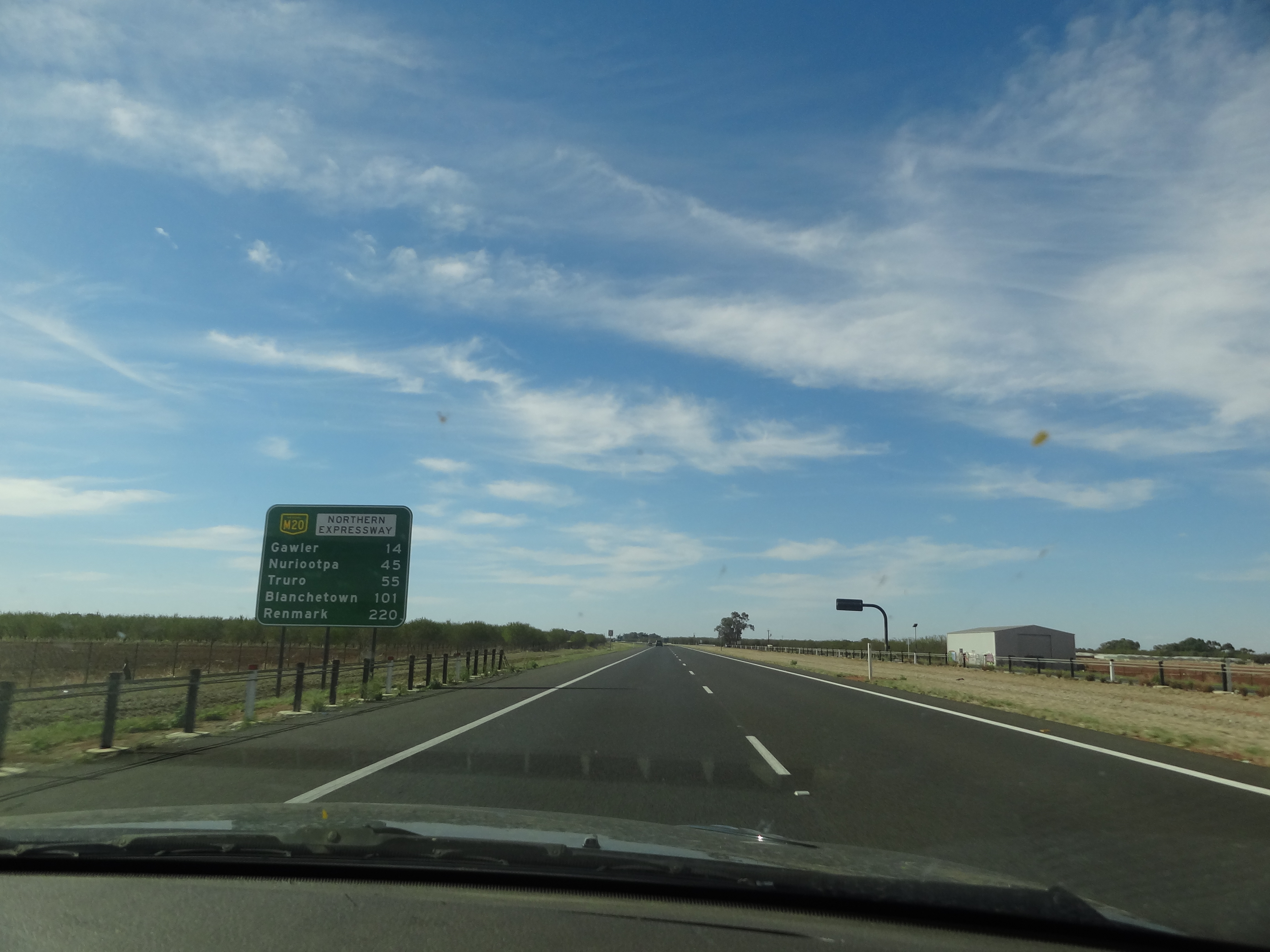
- The Northern Expressway looking north, halfway along the expressway
- Coordinates: 34.593842°S 138.730013°E (Northeast end); 34.705113°S 138.572754°E (Southwest end)

General information
- Type: Freeway
- Length: 20.9 km (13 mi)
- Opened: 13 September 2010
- Route number(s): M2 (2016–present)
- Former route number: National Highway M20 (2010–2016)

Major junctions
- Northeast end: Sturt Highway; Gawler, Adelaide
- Two Wells Road; Port Wakefield Road
- Southwest end: Northern Connector; Waterloo Corner, Adelaide

Location(s)
- Region: Northern Adelaide, Barossa Light and Lower North
- Major suburbs / towns: Angle Vale, Penfield

Highway system
- Highways in Australia; National Highway • Freeways in Australia; Highways in South Australia

Northern Expressway (also known as the Fatchen Northern Expressway) is a 21 kilometre long controlled-access highway in Adelaide, South Australia. Since March 2020, the North–South Motorway continues west of Port Wakefield Highway and intersects the Port River Expressway to reach the harbour at Port Adelaide. These are the northernmost two parts of the North–South Corridor.

Cycling is not permitted on the Expressway. The Stuart O'Grady Bikeway is a sealed shared cycling and walking path adjacent to the eastern side of the expressway. The northern end connects to the on-ramp from Two Wells Road to the Gawler Bypass, and the southern end is adjacent to Port Wakefield Road at Mill Road.

== Route ==
Northern Expressway starts at the grade-separated interchange with the Sturt Highway in Gawler. It heads southwest, just beyond the northern fringes of suburban Adelaide, to the Port Wakefield Highway at Waterloo Corner. The road has been built to a four-lane standard and provides a faster route between northern Adelaide and Gawler, relieving pressure mostly from Main North Road and other roads through Adelaide's northeastern suburbs. It allows freight vehicles to avoid residential areas and go straight to Port Wakefield Road.

== History ==
The largest road project undertaken in South Australia in at least sixty years, the expressway was delivered at a cost of approximately A$564 million jointly funded by the South Australian and Commonwealth Governments. The Design and Construct contract was awarded to the Fulton Hogan York Joint Venture, a partnership between trans-Tasman contractor Fulton Hogan and South Australian based York Civil.

The design joint venture, managed by Fulton Hogan York Joint Venture, consisted of Maunsell, SMEC and Dare Sutton Clark. The work included an 8 km upgrade of the existing Port Wakefield Road. Part of the cost was covered by the AusLink national transport funding.

Construction began in 2008. The road opened in September 2010.

The interchanges/bridges along the expressway were all named after famous battles in which Australian forces fought, such as Long Tan, Kokoda, Tobruk, Kapyong and Hamel.

In November 2013, one year after the death of prominent South Australian author and journalist Max Fatchen, the Northern Expressway was given the dual name "Fatchen Northern Expressway" in his honour.

In December 2019, a bushfire started on the Northern Expressway at Angle Vale. This affected people in Hillier, Munno Para Downs, Kudla, Munno Para West and Gawler.

In February 2020, the on ramp from northbound on Port Wakefield Road was permanently closed. Three weeks later, the Northern Connector project was opened, continuing the freeway south from the Northern Expressway as the North–South Motorway.

== Exit list ==
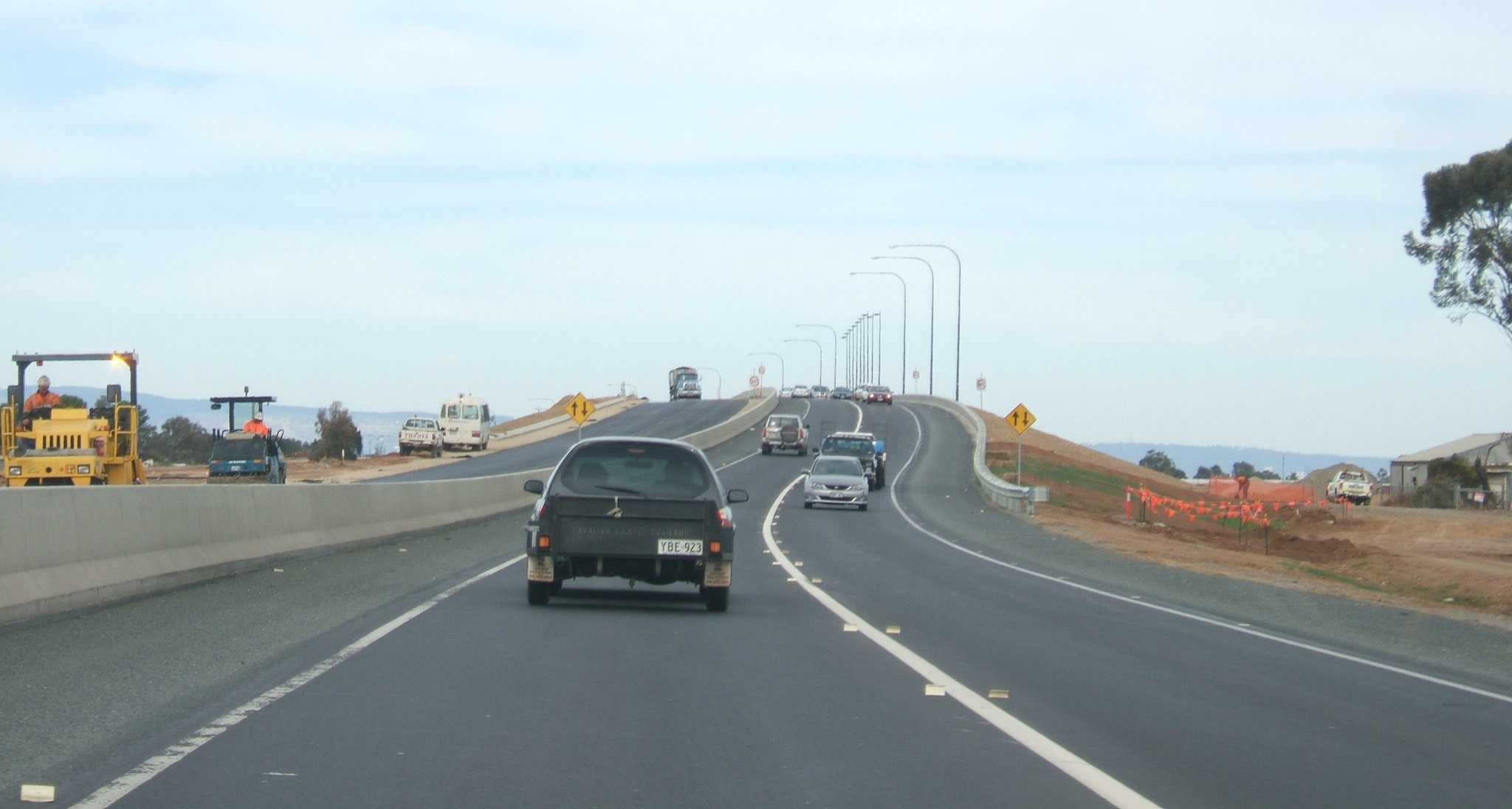
Looking south along Port Wakefield Road towards the interchange at the start of the Northern Expressway in 2010

LGA	Location	km	mi	Name	Destinations	Notes
Light	Ward Belt–Reid–Buchfelde tripoint	0.0	0.0		Sturt Highway (A20) – Nuriootpa, Renmark, Mildura	Northeastern terminus of expressway and route M2
Light	Buchfelde–Gawler River boundary	4.1	2.5	Long Tan	Two Wells Road (B77) – Two Wells, Gawler	Southwest-bound entrance and northeast-bound exit only
Gawler River		5.1	3.2	Bridge over the river (bridge name unknown)		
Playford	Hillier–Munno Para Downs–Angle Vale tripoint	7.5	4.7	Kapyong	Angle Vale Road – Angle Vale, Virginia, Evanston	
Playford	Munno Para West–Andrews Farm–Angle Vale–MacDonald Park quadripoint	10.8	6.7	Kokoda	Curtis Road – Andrews Farm, Angle Vale	
Playford	Penfield Gardens–MacDonald Park–Penfield tripoint	15.1	9.4	Tobruk	Heaslip Road – Edinburgh, RAAF Base Edinburgh	
Playford	Penfield Gardens–Penfield boundary	17.3	10.7	Hamel	Penfield Road – Virginia	Southwest bound entrance and northeast bound exit only
Playford	Penfield–Waterloo Corner–Virginia–Penfield Gardens quadripoint	18.8	11.7	Adelaide-Port Augusta railway line		
Playford	Waterloo Corner–Virginia boundary	20.9	13.0		Port Wakefield Road (A1 south) – Burton, Adelaide	No entrance from or exit to Port Wakefield Road northbound
Playford	Waterloo Corner–Virginia boundary	20.9	13.0		North-South Motorway (M2 southwest) – Bolivar, Wingfield	Southwestern terminus of expressway, route M2 continues southwest along North-South Motorway
Incomplete access; Route transition

== See also ==
- Freeways in Australia
- Freeways in South Australia
