= Womma railway station =

Railway station in Adelaide, South Australia

Womma
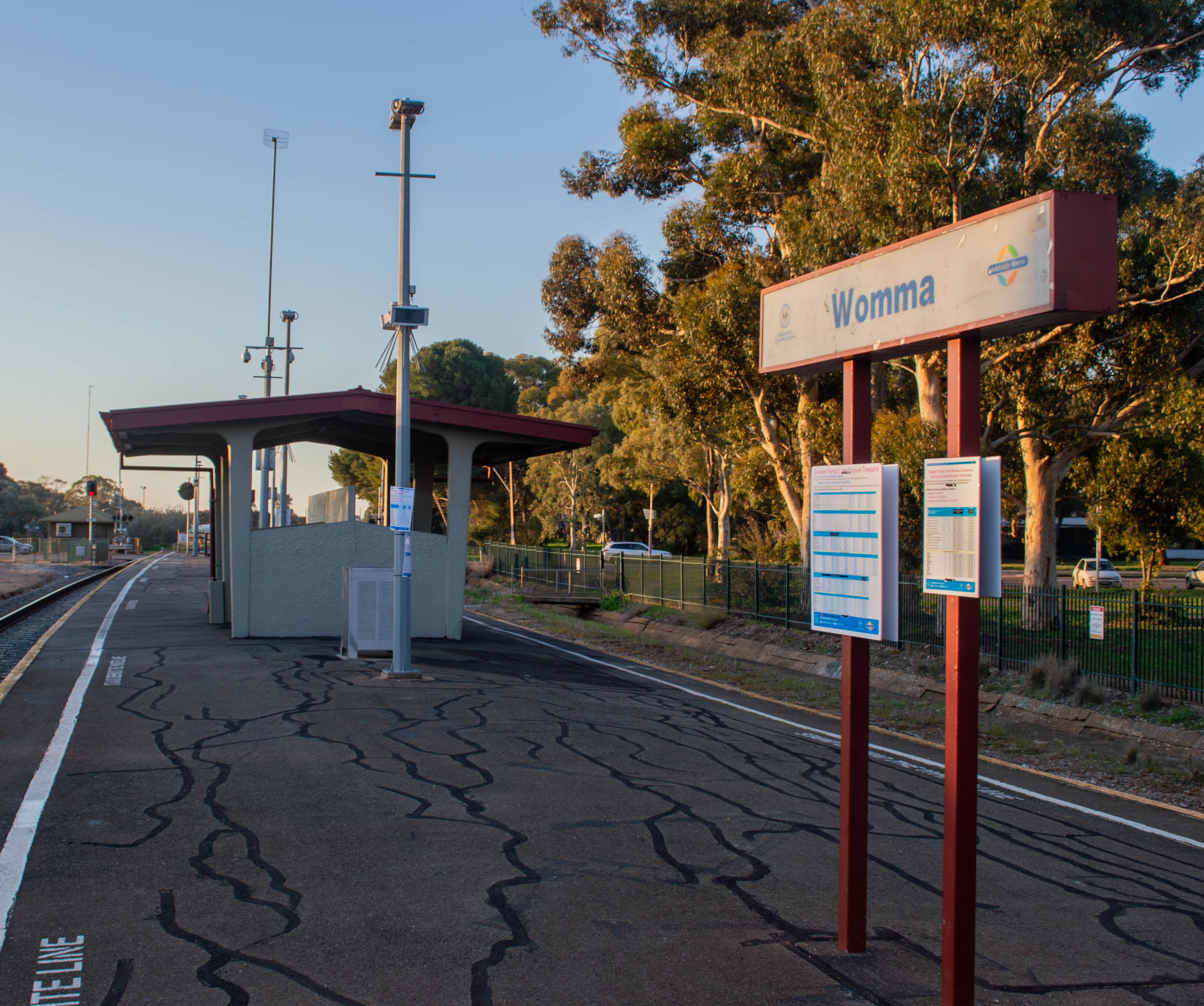
- Northbound view from Platform 1, July 2020

General information
- Location: Womma Road, on the border of Elizabeth North and Edinburgh North
- Coordinates: 34°42′15″S 138°40′12″E
- Owner: Department for Infrastructure & Transport
- Operator: Adelaide Metro
- Line: Gawler
- Distance: 27.3 km from Adelaide
- Platforms: 2
- Tracks: 2
- Connections: Bus

Construction
- Structure type: Ground
- Parking: Yes
- Cycle facilities: No
- Accessible: Yes

Other information
- Station code: 16569 (to City); 18552 (to Gawler Central)
- Website: Adelaide Metro

History
- Opened: 1950
- Rebuilt: 2021-2022

Services
Preceding station	Adelaide Metro	Following station
Elizabeth towards Adelaide	Gawler line	Broadmeadows towards Gawler Central
Location

Womma railway station is located on the Gawler line. Situated in the northern Adelaide suburb of Elizabeth North, it is 27.3 kilometres (17.0 mi) from Adelaide station.

== History ==
Womma opened in 1950.

It had a small building on the platform which consisted of a shelter, with a ticket office and toilets on either side, but they were demolished in the 1980s and early 1990s. Only the shelter remains. Passengers were required to access the station via a pedestrian underpass, but it has since been closed due to concerns of safety and vandalism. There are two low-level crossings for people to reach the station.

== Platforms and Services ==
Womma has an island platform and is serviced by Adelaide Metro. Trains are scheduled every 30 minutes, seven days a week.

Platform	Destination
1	Gawler and Gawler Central
2	Adelaide

== Transport Links ==
Bus transfers: Stop 69 Womma Rd
Route no.	Destination & route details
452	to Elizabeth Interchange
452	to Munno Para Shopping City, via Smithfield Interchange
