= Andrews Farm =

- Suburb
- Coordinates: 34.672°S 138.667°E
- Country: Australia
- State: South Australia
- City: Adelaide
- LGA: City of Playford
- Location: 29 km (18 mi) NE of Adelaide city centre
- Established: 1991

Government
  - State electorate: Taylor (2011)
  - Federal division: Spence

Population
  - Total: 8,699 (SAL 2021)
- Postcode: 5114
Suburbs around Andrews Farm
MacDonald Park	Munno Para West	Munno Para West
MacDonald Park	Andrews Farm	Smithfield Plains
Eyre	Eyre	Davoren Park

Andrews Farm is a northern suburb of Adelaide, South Australia. It is located in the City of Playford.

== History ==
Andrews Farm was founded in 1991 as a suburb in the then Munno Para Council. It was formed following the renaming of Smithfield West in recognition of the Andrews' who were local farming Families.

== Geography ==
Andrews Farm lies north of Elizabeth and west of Smithfield Plains, South Australia. It is bounded by the Northern Expressway, Curtis Road, Stebonheath Road and Petherton Road. It was originally rectangular in shape, with the western boundary being Andrews Road. Andrews Farm was extended west to the Northern Expressway in 2011 to prevent the suburb of Macdonald Park being divided by the new freeway.

== Demographics ==
The 2006 Census by the Australian Bureau of Statistics counted 3,336 persons in Andrews Farm on census night. Of these, 48.1% were male and 51.9% were female. Within ten years, the population has more than doubled to 8,043, and in 2021 the population increased to 8,699.

The majority of residents (78.5%) are of Australian birth, with an additional 3.6% declaring England as their country of birth.

The average age of Andrews Farm residents is lower than the greater Australian population. 57.2% of residents were over 25 years in 2021, compared to the Australian average of 69.9%; and 42.8% were younger than 25 years, compared to the Australian average of 30.1%.

== Community ==
The local newspaper is the News Review Messenger. Other regional and national newspapers such as The Advertiser and The Australian are also available.

St Columba College is located near the centre of the suburb on President Avenue.

== Facilities and attractions ==
The largest parkland in Andrews Farm is Stebonheath Park, located in the central east of the suburb. Andrews Park lies in the northeast.

== Transportation ==
Andrews Farm is serviced by Curtis Road, linking the suburb to Munno Para, Angle Vale and the Max Fatchen Expressway. Davoren Road connects Andrews Farm to Smithfield.

Andrews Farm is serviced by buses operated by the Adelaide Metro. The main bus routes through the suburb use Curtis Road, President Avenue and East parkway. Other routes service the edges of the suburb along Curtis Road or Stebonheath Road. Bus routes connect to Elizabeth Interchange, Smithfield Interchange and the Munno Para Shopping City interchange.

Bicycle paths lie throughout Stebonheath Park. The Stuart O'Grady Bikeway skirts the western edge of Andrews Farm adjacent to the Max Fatchen Expressway with access at Curtis Road and Petherton Road (gate).

== Private Developments ==
In recent times Andrews Farm has seen 2 private developments/communities be announced and begin construction. These 2 have been Brookmont and St Andrews, Brookmont having begun selling lots in late 2019, and St Andrews beginning in early 2022. Both of these developments bring high quality communities with parks, rivers and other sporting facilities.

== See also ==
- List of Adelaide suburbs
