= Broadmeadows railway station =

Broadmeadows railway station may refer to:

- Broadmeadows railway station, Adelaide
- Broadmeadows railway station, Melbourne

== See also ==
- Broadmeadow railway station in Newcastle, New South Wales
