= Elizabeth North (disambiguation) =

Elizabeth North is a northern suburb of Adelaide.

Elizabeth North may refer to:

- Elizabeth North railway station, former name of railway station Broadmeadows railway station in Adelaide
- Elizabeth North (Scandal), character in American television show Scandal
- North Elizabeth station, NJ Transit station on the Northeast Corridor in Elizabeth, New Jersey
