= Eyre, South Australia =

Eyre
- Suburb
- Coordinates: 34.69°S 138.65°E
- Country: Australia
- State: South Australia
- City: City of Playford
- LGA: City of Playford
- Location: 4.0 km (2.5 mi) northwest of Elizabeth
- Established: 2017

Government
  - State electorate: Taylor
  - Federal division: Spence

Population
  - Total: 1,113 (SAL 2021)
- Postcode: 5121
Suburbs around Eyre
Macdonald Park	Andrews Farm
	Eyre	Davoren Park
Penfield	Edinburgh North

Eyre is a suburb of Adelaide in the City of Playford. It was created on 31 October 2017 by cutting off the northeastern corner of what had been the suburb of Penfield. Its boundaries are Womma, Stebonheath and Petherton Roads on the south, east and north sides. The west follows Andrews Road north from Womma Road, but then extends west to the Northern Expressway.

== History ==
On 31 October 2017, this section was excised from Penfield and the new suburb of Eyre was created on the north side of Womma Road and western side of Stebonheath Road. The eastern side was dominated by a housing estate which had been marketed as "Eyre at Penfield".
