= Pinfield =

Pinfield is a surname. Notable people with the surname include:

- Matt Pinfield (born 1961), American TV host, disc jockey and music executive
- Mervyn Pinfield (1912–1966), British TV producer and director
- Reginald Pinfield (1894–1972), English cricketer

== See also ==
- Penfield (disambiguation)
