= MacDonald Park, South Australia =

MacDonald Park
- Suburb
- Coordinates: 34.669°S 138.645°E
- Country: Australia
- State: South Australia
- City: Adelaide
- LGA: City of Playford
- Established: 1964

Government
  - State electorate: Taylor
  - Federal division: Spence

Population
  - Total: 503 (SAL 2021)
- Postcode: 5121
Suburbs around MacDonald Park
	Angle Vale	Munno Para West
Penfield Gardens	MacDonald Park	Andrews Farm
	Penfield	Eyre

In the Hundred of Munno Para the suburb of MacDonald Park was established by MacDonald Reid Pty Ltd in 1964.

MacDonald Park is a northern suburb of Adelaide, South Australia in the City of Playford. It is north and west of a bend in the Max Fatchen Expressway, bounded by Curtis Road and Heaslip Road on the north and west sides.

The suburb boundaries were adjusted on 2 June 2011 when the Max Fatchen Expressway was built so that suburbs did not span the expressway. The area south of Petherton Road changed from Penfield to Macdonald Park, and the area between the Expressway and Andrews Road changed from Macdonald Park to Andrews Farm. Some of the current suburb and part of the land transferred to Andrews Farm was formerly the Smithfield magazine area, which had been closed before the expressway was built across it. The Curtis Road interchange is also built on former munitions store land.

== History ==
According to the city of playford, in the initial stages of World War II, the Commonwealth Government initiated a significant expansion effort to produce munitions, this included the establishment of four munitions facilities in and around Adelaide, that being a small arms factory at Hendon, a foundry and rolling mill at Finsbury, an explosive and filling factory at Salisbury, and a magazine area at Smithfield.

The Smithfield magazine was erected in early 1941 on a 530-hectare site, situated approximately 5 km north of the Salisbury Explosive and Filling Factory, its primary function was to serve as the storage facility for munitions produced at the Salisbury factory, housing materials such as Cordite, TNT, and Nitrocellulose, the site was positioned at the intersection of Curtis and Andrew’s roads, MacDonald Park.

In total, around 95 buildings were constructed, comprising thirty 50-ton magazines and three 100-ton magazine building's.

In the early 1960s, a section of the decommissioned Smithfield Magazine area, once part of the munitions factory constructed in the Penfield area during the early 1940s, (also known as the Salisbury explosives factory, now Edinburgh Park), the land was sold by the government to MacDonald Reid Pty Ltd who developed the sold section of land into MacDonald Park farmlets in 1964.

The 50 ton magazine buildings in the newly founded suburb were reutilized, with some of the building's being refurbished & used as a homestead.
