= Penfield Gardens, South Australia =

Penfield Gardens
- Suburb
- Coordinates: 34.6514°S 138.61233°E
- Country: Australia
- State: South Australia
- City: Adelaide
- LGA: City of Playford
- Location: 8 km (5.0 mi) NW of Elizabeth
- Established: 1983

Government
  - State electorate: Taylor
  - Federal division: Sturt

Population
  - Total: 304 (SAL 2021)
- Postcode: 5121
Suburbs around Penfield Gardens
| | Lewiston | Angle Vale |
| Virginia | Penfield Gardens | MacDonald Park |
| | Penfield |

Penfield Gardens is a northern suburb of Adelaide, South Australia in the City of Playford. It is in the urban fringe on the Adelaide Plains, with major industries including market gardening and harness racing horse training.

Penfield Gardens extends from the south (left) bank of the Gawler River downstream of Angle Vale to the Max Fatchen Expressway. The suburb was named in 1983, with the boundaries further adjusted in 2011 to avoid suburbs being divided by the Max Fatchen Expressway.

== Carclew ==
The Carclew Primitive Methodist Church was built on what is now Carclew Road in Penfield Gardens in 1850. It was replaced by a newer building which opened on 12 June 1870. Regular services ceased in 1919, however the building and cemetery were maintained by the trustees for many years. The furnishings were sold to the Anglican church at Lobethal. The District Council of Munno Para took over ownership in 1965, which became the City of Playford in 1997. The church was sold in 2003 and is now a private residence. The cemetery remains under control of the City of Playford but is not available for new burials. The land for the church and cemetery were donated by Jonathon Roberts who had named his property Carclew after the area in Cornwall from which he had migrated.
