= Penfield railway line =

Former railway in northern Adelaide, South Australia

Penfield railway line was a railway in northern Adelaide which was built mainly for industrial purposes during World War II. It started just north of Salisbury station on the Gawler line, running north-west, then north, through defence land in what is now Edinburgh. The line served four stations: Hilra, Penfield 1, Penfield 2, and Penfield 3. It was double track for the whole length, with a balloon loop at the end to allow trains to turn around.

== History ==
The line opened in 1941 to serve various World War II armaments factories at what was then known as Penfield. Because it was built for industrial purposes, sidings branched off both the up and down tracks at many locations. The largest siding went into what is now RAAF Base Edinburgh, the approximate location of the Salisbury Explosives Factory, built between November 1940 and November 1941.

During the war years, the line was used by passenger trains carrying workers to the munitions factories in the area, which manufactured components for the Small Arms Ammunition Factories, as well as freight trains carrying raw materials in and armaments out. Passenger trains were necessary because Salisbury was a semi-rural community at the time and most of the workforce had to be brought in from other districts.

A more limited peak-hour passenger service to Penfield continued after the war, serving staff at the government Weapons Research Establishment, later to become the Defence Science and Technology Organisation (DSTO).

The balloon loop was closed on 8 June 1983, following the derailment of a train composed of Redhens railcars #319, #870, #318, #330, #869 & #331 while traversing it. Services continued to Penfield 3 on the down track and returned on the up track, using a crossover located just south of Penfield 3. The up track beyond Hilra was closed on 14 April 1984, along with most of the sidings. The remaining sidings were closed in 1986, and the whole of the branch had been reduced to single track by the end of the 1980s.

Due to low patronage and the need to fund an upgrade of the worn-out track, the remaining peak-hour services were withdrawn from the Penfield branch in January 1991, The last train ran on 4 January, using a Redhen set, consisting of cars 309, 311, 416 and 415. The track was dismantled in the same year, but about 200m of track from Salisbury station was retained so that trains from Adelaide terminating at Salisbury could change direction back to Adelaide. The short spur remained, but the next section through Hilra station was replaced by a road through an industrial estate.
