= St Columba College =

Location
- President Avenue; Andrews Farm, South Australia, 5114; Australia; 34.6729°S 138.6653°E

Information
- Type: Independent, co-educational, combined primary and secondary
- Established: 1996; 30 years ago
- Founders: Ian George; Leonard Faulkner
- Principal: Darren Pitt
- Staff: 200
- Grades: Foundation – Year 12
- Enrollment: > 1600 (2026)
- Campuses: 2 ( Primary; Secondary)
- Houses: Broughton; Faulkner; Short; Lashmar; MacKillop; MacLennan; Mitchell; Polding
Annual tuition
R-2:	AU$3,000
3-6:	AU$3,300
7:	AU$3,700
8-9:	AU$4,700
10-12:	AU$5,400
- Owner/operator: St Columba College Munno Para Incorporated
- Website: www.stcolumba.sa.edu.au
- Last updated: 1 August 2026

St Columba College is a Catholic and Anglican co-educational school located in Andrews Farm, a northern suburb of Adelaide, South Australia. The college has two campuses, for primary and secondary education, located on either side of President Avenue, the main street of Andrews Farm, and enrols approximately 1,600 students across Foundation to Year 12.

St Columba College was the first joint Catholic and Anglican co-educational school established in Australia. It was founded in 1996 as an ecumenical initiative by Ian George and Leonard Faulkner, the Anglican and Catholic Archbishops of Adelaide at the time, with the first students enrolling in 1997.

Instruction is organised across the college's two campuses into three sequential sub-schools — the Junior, Middle and Senior Schools — providing a coordinated pastoral and academic structure for students from Foundation to Year 12.

== History ==
Planning for the college began in 1995 and continued throughout 1996, when an Anglican and Catholic Schools Committee was formed to oversee its establishment and to prepare for the college's opening the following year. The Hickinbotham Group donated the land on which the Primary campus was subsequently built. Madeleine Brennan was appointed the college's inaugural principal in June 1996, supported by an Interim Management Committee established to coordinate planning at the local level. Construction of the Primary campus commenced on 16 September 1996, and the college opened in January 1997 with an enrolment of 207 students.

Having initially been established as a primary school, the college sought government approval to extend into secondary education. This was granted in October 1999, and from 2000 the college began its transition into a full Foundation-to-Year-12 institution. Enrolment has since grown considerably, from the founding cohort of 207 students to more than 1,600 by 2026.

=== Principals ===
Madeleine Brennan served as the college's founding principal. Appointed in June 1996, she led St Columba through its January 1997 opening and its subsequent expansion into secondary education, before concluding her tenure in 2014. She was succeeded by Wayne Gladigau, who served as interim principal and provided continuity in leadership until the appointment of Leanne Carr. Carr led the college for eight years, concluding her tenure at the end of the 2023 school year to take up a role with Catholic Education SA from 5 February 2024. Darren Pitt, who had served as deputy principal since 2021, was announced as her successor and assumed the role of principal at the start of 2024. Pitt was previously principal of the Springfield Anglican College, deputy principal of Seymour College, and director of teaching and learning at St Peter's College, and served as acting head of college at St Mark's College in 2019. He holds a Master of Educational Leadership and Administration, a Bachelor of Arts with Honours, and a Postgraduate Certificate in Education.

Principal	Years	Notes
Madeleine Brennan	1996–2014	Founding principal; appointed June 1996, led the College's 1997 opening and its expansion into secondary education.
Wayne Gladigau†	2014–2016	Interim principal, bridging the transition to Leanne Carr.
Leanne Carr	2016–2023	Led the College for eight years; departed to join Catholic Education SA from 5 February 2024.
Darren Pitt	2024–present	Previously deputy principal (2021–2023); took up the role of principal at the start of 2024.

== Governance ==
St Columba College is owned and operated by St Columba College Munno Para Incorporated, a registered charity, in partnership with the Anglican and Catholic Archbishops of Adelaide. (Note: The college's own governance materials refer to this body as the "St Columba College Council Munno Para Inc."; the Australian Charities and Not-for-profits Commission and the Australian Children's Education and Care Quality Authority both register the entity under the name "St Columba College Munno Para Incorporated".) The charity carries an Australian Business Number of 40 836 371 602.

The college's governing body, the College Council, oversees governance, policy and administrative matters, and is responsible for the appointment of college leadership. Its membership comprises four Anglican appointees, four Catholic appointees, four persons elected from the college's official membership, and the college principal, who serves ex officio.

As of 2026, the College Council's membership is as follows:

- Jo Smith, chairperson and secretary of the council, an Anglican priest serving as archdeacon of the Para in the Diocese of Adelaide.
- Shane Clay, vice-chairperson and public officer, founder and managing director of Caznet, an Adelaide telecommunications and cloud services provider.
- Kirsty Alm, chair of the finance and capital development committee, a conveyancer with the Crown Solicitor's Office in the South Australian attorney-general's department.
- Phil Proctor, council member, assistant director of information and communications technology for Catholic Education South Australia.
- Michael Kenny, council member, formerly assistant director, people and culture, at the Catholic Education Office.
- Jamie Blowes, council member, manager of school performance leaders at the Catholic Education Office Adelaide.
- Simon Murray OAM KGSJ FACE, council member, former headmaster of Bunbury Cathedral Grammar School, Canberra Grammar School and St Peter's College.
- Helen Clarke, council member.
- Jennifer Steel, council member, a veteran of the Royal Australian Air Force.
- Kim Moffatt, council member.
- Jen Miller, council member.

At the time of Darren Pitt's appointment as principal in early 2024, the Council's chairperson was Bruno Vieceli.

== College program ==
The college offers a broad Student Life program giving all students access to a wide range of sports, clubs and co-curricular groups. Dedicated wellbeing programs are embedded across both campuses, designed to support students academically, socially and emotionally throughout their schooling journey. The college's approach to wellbeing is underpinned by Positive Education principles, with a focus on resilience, belonging and individual student growth.

Co-curricular offerings extend to music, chess, drama, and team sports and athletics, with students from the Junior, Middle and Senior Schools competing in Northern Zone carnivals and in SAPSASA and SACPSSA interschool sporting competitions.

=== Behaviour Curriculum and leadership initiatives ===
In January 2024, incoming Principal Darren Pitt introduced a college-wide Behaviour Curriculum in response to persistent classroom disruption and elevated staff turnover, drawing on the work of education consultant Tom Bennett. The curriculum is taught explicitly to every student from Foundation to Year 12 and establishes consistent, whole-school expectations regarding conduct, thereby reducing time lost to transitions between lessons. The college has reported that the initiative coincided with the highest NAPLAN results in its history in 2024, an improvement in median ATAR scores, an increase in staff retention from 68 per cent in 2023 to 87 per cent in 2024, and enrolment growth of 8.5 per cent following a prior decline. In parallel, Pitt established a Women in Leadership Program in 2024 in response to a shortage of female applicants for senior positions; the program supports approximately 30 women across teaching and non-teaching roles through mentoring, leadership training and professional networking, and has since been extended to other schools in Adelaide's northern suburbs.

=== Reconciliation Action Plan ===
St Columba College has published a Reconciliation Action Plan (RAP), setting out its commitment to fostering sustainable relationships founded on respect and mutual understanding between Aboriginal and Torres Strait Islander peoples and the wider college community. The RAP was launched at a whole-school assembly attended by senior Kaurna man Uncle Mickey Kumatpi O'Brien, who conducted a traditional smoking ceremony for students.

== Campus Development ==
St Columba College has undertaken a significant infrastructure investment across its Secondary campus to support growing enrolment demand. In 2024, the college formally opened the first of two new Secondary buildings as part of a $20 million expansion. The new building includes 12 new classrooms, outdoor learning areas, a Wellbeing Hub and a dedicated Diverse Learning Centre. Existing Secondary facilities were also refurbished as part of the project, including covered sports courts and a dedicated Performing Arts Theatre. The opening was officially blessed by both Catholic archbishop Patrick O'Regan and Anglican archbishop Geoffrey Smith, alongside South Australian Education Minister Blair Boyer MP.

The second new Secondary building, the Clonard Building, officially opened on 22 July 2026.

Redevelopment of the Primary campus is planned to commence at the end of 2026, with the expansion designed to accommodate the college's growing enrolment, which reached 1,600 students in 2026.

The college's two campuses lie on opposite sides of President Avenue.

== Awards and recognition ==
In 2025, Principal Darren Pitt was named to The Educator's Most Influential Educators list, an annual national list of 50 Australian education professionals selected by nomination, in recognition of the college's Behaviour Curriculum and Women in Leadership Program and their associated improvements in academic results, staff retention and enrolment.

In 2026, St Columba College was named among The Educator's 5-Star Employers of Choice, an annual national list recognising Australian schools that achieve an employee satisfaction rating of 75 per cent or higher in an anonymous staff survey. The accompanying profile noted a marked improvement in staff retention, from an annual attrition rate of roughly one-third in 2023 to a retention rate of 91 per cent by 2025, and reported that 94 per cent of appointments to positions of responsibility at the college in 2025 were filled internally. It further noted that more than 30 per cent of St Columba students speak a language other than English at home, and highlighted initiatives including a Teacher Development Program, a Working from Home Day Strategy offering staff one flexible day per term, and a planned 2027 expansion into a Staff Development Program encompassing all employees, including Education Support Officer staff.

== Affordability and community access ==
St Columba College has been recognised for providing quality independent education to families across Adelaide's northern suburbs. In February 2026, the college was featured in The Advertiser in a report examining data published by the Australian Curriculum, Assessment and Reporting Authority (ACARA), which showed that South Australian independent schools charge the lowest average fees of any state in Australia. The article featured a St Columba College family as an example of the value and quality of care that South Australian independent schooling delivers, with the college recognised for its strong pastoral support programs alongside its accessible fee structure.

== Notable alumni ==
- Awer Mabil, professional footballer for the Australian national football team, graduated 2013; named Alumni of the Year 2022.
- Leek Aleer, professional Australian rules footballer for the Greater Western Sydney Giants, selected with pick 15 in the 2021 AFL Draft. Born in Kenya to South Sudanese parents, Aleer came to Australia as a refugee at age six. He broke the all-time record for the running vertical jump at the South Australian Draft Combine.
- Sarah Irvine, film and television Production Executive at Werner Film Productions, with credits including Surviving Summer (Netflix) and The Newsreader (ABC).

== Notes ==
† Wayne Gladigau passed away 26/7/2026.
