= Mark Oliphant College =

Location
- Australia; 34.665°S 138.683°E

Information
- Motto: Make Learning Better
- Established: January 2010
- Principal: Kerry Williams
- Years: Birth to Year 12
- Enrollment: 1,675
- Campus size: 24 permanent buildings, several smaller storage sheds for maintaining, 2 carparks. Large P.E. space
- Campus type: "2009 super school"
- Houses: Peachy, Beaumont, Newton, Douglas.
- Colors: Red, navy, white, grey
- Website: moc.sa.edu.au

Mark Oliphant College is a public school in the northern suburbs of Adelaide, South Australia. It teaches students from birth to year 12 and is named after Sir Mark Oliphant.

Mark Oliphant College opened in the newly developed area of Munno Para during 2011, after having used two of the former sites since the beginning of 2010. It combined the students from the former Smithfield Plains High School, Smithfield Plains Primary School, Junior Primary and Kindergarten, all having been in the next suburb south, Smithfield Plains.

The school buildings are arranged in a circle around a village green which is occasionally used for communal gatherings and as a cricket field for the primary years. The village green features ten paved tennis courts, a full-sized AFL oval and two full-sized soccer pitches to facilitate physical education.

The previous Mark Oliphant College campuses (colloquially known as "Old MOC") in Smithfield Plains have now been demolished and the land has been cleared for housing developments. The majority of Mark Oliphant College's senior teaching staff started their careers at Smithfield Plains High School.
