= Penfield 2 railway station =

Former railway station in South Australia, Australia

Coordinates: 34°43′51″S 138°38′22″E

Penfield 2 railway station was located on the Penfield line located in the northern Adelaide suburb of Edinburgh. It was located 24.2 kilometres from Adelaide station. The station opened between 1940 and 1942 and had an island platform which was 213.4 metres long. The station closed on 4 January 1991, simultaneously with neighbouring station Penfield 1 station. It has since been demolished.

Preceding station	Disused railways	Following station
Penfield 1	Penfield line	Penfield 3
