= Hilra railway station =

Former railway station in South Australia, Australia

Coordinates: 34°45′01″S 138°38′24″E

Hilra railway station is a former railway station on the defunct Penfield line which is located in the northern Adelaide suburb of Salisbury North. It is located 21.7 kilometres from the Adelaide station. The station was located parallel to Langford Terrace, adjacent to the freight train line, and inline roughly to Compton Street.

The station was opened in 1941 along with the Penfield line. The station name is derived from the "native word for wind". The station was different from the others as it had up and down stepdown platforms about 61 metres long. The station was unstaffed and had a small shelter. There were similar facilities on the side of the adjacent Port Pirie line.

The station had closed by 3 February 1988, with the steps on the down platform (which was on the 'main line' side at the time) having been removed. The station is now long gone, it was probably demolished in 1991, when the line closed. There are several buildings on the old Hilra station site, including a Streets factory.

Preceding station	Disused railways	Following station
Salisbury	Penfield line	Penfield 1
