= Penfield (surname) =

Penfield is a surname. Notable people with the name include:

- Add Penfield (Addison Pierce Penfield, 1918–2010), North Carolina sports radio broadcaster
- Daniel Penfield (1759–1840), founder of Penfield, New York
- E. Jean Nelson Penfield (1872–1961), American lawyer, parliamentarian
- Edward Penfield (1866–1925), American illustrator and poster artist
- Frederic Courtland Penfield (1855–1922), American diplomat
- Josiah Penfield (1785–1828), American silversmith
- Roderic C. Penfield (1864–1921), American publisher, printer, editor, journalist, theatre critic, businessman, playwright, and lyricist
- Samuel Penfield Taylor (1827–1886), American entrepreneur
- Smith Newell Penfield (1837–1920), American composer
- Thomas Penfield Jackson (1937–2013), US District Court Judge
- Wilder Penfield (1891–1976), Canadian neurosurgeon
