= Small Arms Ammunition Factory =

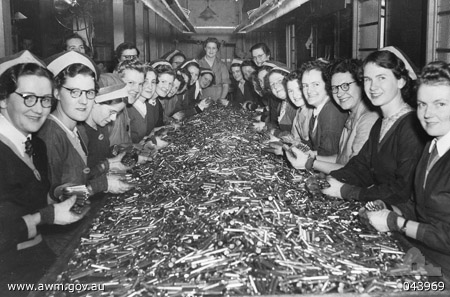
Women bundling ammunition in a Commonwealth Small Arms Ammunition Factory, c. 1944

The Small Arms Ammunition Factories (SAAF) were ammunition manufacturing plants run by the Australian government. Nearly all of their production was for domestic use by their military, the police forces, and government-appointed agents.

== Founding (1888–1939) ==
In 1888 the Colonial Ammunition Company of New Zealand founded an ammunition factory in Footscray, a suburb of Melbourne, Victoria. During World War One from 1915 to 1918 the plant made over 2 million rounds of rifle ammunition a year. It was purchased by the Australian government in 1927.

The Defence Explosive Factory Maribyrnong opened in 1908. A factory annexe was built in 1912 to supply Footscray with domestically-produced cordite. It also had an ordnance annexe that produced artillery pieces, mortars, and shells. During World War One, the phrase "Made in Maribyrnong" referred to how central the town and its industries were to the Australian war effort.

The Footscray plant's headstamp was originally CAC from 1888 to 1918 and ->CAC<- (the letters between two horizontal "Government Property" arrowheads) from 1918 to 1920. The headstamp was changed to ->SAAF<- (for "Small Arms Ammunition Factory") from 1921 to 1923 and one lot in March 1924, A↑F ("AF" for "Ammunition Factory", the letters flanking a vertical arrowhead) during 1924 to 1925, "↑F" (vertical arrowhead to the left of the F) from 1925 to 1926, and MF (for "Military Factory") from 1926 to 1945.

== World War Two production (1939–1945) ==
In August 1939, a plan was created to expand native ordnance production in case a war cut Australia off from the rest of the Commonwealth. The antiquated ammunition plant at Footscray was to be abandoned as soon as a more modern and efficient factory was built nearby. To differentiate between them, in 1940 the old factory briefly received the designation of Munitions Factory No.1 (MF1) and the new factory was designated Munitions Factory No.2 (MF2). Demand forced the old factory (later redesignated SAAF No.1) to remain open until the war's end. The new factory (now designated SAAF No. 2) would be the only one to remain open after the war. The plans to make one factory at Hendon northwest of Adelaide was expanded to two factories (designated SAAFs No. 3 & No. 4) that were built only a few hundred metres apart. Conversely, the original plans to make two small factories at Rocklea south of Brisbane (originally designated SAAFs No. 5 & No. 6) was abandoned and one large facility was made instead (SAAF No. 5). The sixth and last factory at Welshpool in Perth (originally to be designated SAAF No. 7) received the designation of SAAF No. 6.

In 1940 the workforce at Footscray grew from a few hundred men to 6,000 men and women at its peak. Employees worked 12-hour shifts for six days a week. A women's hostel was opened across the street to house the female workforce and ensure continuous operation of the production lines. The Maribyrnong complex employed 20,000 men and women at its peak, with women making up 52% of the workforce.

Note: The acronym in parentheses following the factory's name is the facility's contractor code and headstamp. For example, a rifle cartridge with the headstamp "MH" was made at SAAF No.3 at Hendon. A 25-pounder shell casing with an "MR" headstamp was made at GAF Rutherford.

Headstamp is the facility's code letters at 10 o'clock, the two-digit year of production at 2 o'clock, and the type and mark of cartridge at 6 o'clock.

=== Small Arms Ammunition Factories (SAAF) ===
- Small Arms Ammunition Factory No.1 (MF1 or MF) – Footscray; Melbourne, Victoria (1888–1945) Manufactured .303 rifle and 9mm Parabellum submachine gun (1942–1945) ammunition. Headstamp was initially "MF1" (1940) – later changed to "MF" (1940–1945).
- Small Arms Ammunition Factory No.2 (MF2 or MG) – Footscray; Melbourne, Victoria (1940–1994) Manufactured .303 rifle ammunition. Also manufactured .45 ACP submachine gun ammunition (February, 1943 – July, 1944). Headstamp was initially "MF2" (1940) – later changed to "MG" (1940–1948), "MF" (1949 to 1987), "AFF" (1988 to 1993), and "ADI" (1993–1994). ADI moved production to a new site in Benalla, Victoria and finally closed down the Footscray site in 1994.
- Small Arms Ammunition Factory No.3 (MH) – Hendon; Adelaide, South Australia (1940–1945) Manufactured .303 rifle and 9mm Parabellum submachine-gun (1943-1944) ammunition.
- Small Arms Ammunition Factory No.4 (MJ) – Hendon; Adelaide, South Australia (1940–1945) Manufactured .303 rifle ammunition.
  - Small Arms Ammunition Factory No.4, Annexe B (MJB) – Hendon; Adelaide, South Australia Originally manufactured Australian standard .303 B IV (.303 Incendiary Mark 4) rifle ammunition in 1942. Only 9,000 .303 B IV incendiary rounds were made before the lines were upgraded to produce British standard .303 B VII (.303 Incendiary Mark 7) ammunition.
- Small Arms Ammunition Factory No.5 (MQ) – Rocklea; Brisbane, Queensland (1942–1945) Manufactured .303 rifle ammunition (1942–1943), .380 Enfield and .455 Webley revolver ammunition, .45 ACP submachine gun ammunition (1942–1943), and smoke shells for 2-inch mortars. Machined 25-Pounder Q.F. gun shell casings.
- Small Arms Ammunition Factory No.6 (MW) – Welshpool, Western Australia (1942–1945) Manufactured .303 rifle ammunition.

=== Ammunition factories ===
The small arms ammunition factories were fed by specialised facilities designed to supply their components.

- Ammunition Factory Derwent Park (MD) – Derwent Park, Tasmania. Manufactured cartridge cases and 2-inch mortar shells.
  - Albion Explosives Factory (MDK) (No 5 Explosives Factory) (1939–1986) – Deer Park, Brimbank City, Victoria. Converted ammonia into nitric acid, which was then used to make cordite, fuse powder, and TNT. It also made carbamite - a low explosive made from combining urea (or carbamide) and nitric acid, and nitroglycerine - a high explosive made from combining glycerol and nitric acid.
- Ammunition Factory Hay – Hay, New South Wales. Manufactured fuses.
- Ammunition Factory Kalgoorlie – Kalgoorlie, Western Australia. Manufactured 40mm Bofors shells.
- Guns Ammunition Factory Finsbury (MC) – Finsbury, South Australia. Manufactured cartridge cases and shell fuses.
- Guns Ammunition Factory Rutherford (MR) – Rutherford, New South Wales. Manufactured cartridge cases, 25-Pounder [87.6-mm] Q.F. gun howitzer shells, and anti-aircraft 4-inch [101-mm] Naval Gun shells. Forged 5.5-inch [140-mm] Naval Gun shell cases.
- Explosives Factory Ballarat (MB) – Ballarat, Victoria.
  - Ordnance Factory Bendigo (BO or MBO) – Bendigo, Victoria. Manufactured artillery pieces and assembled shells. Also stamped out ball bearings for later finishing at Echuca and forged races.
- Explosives Factory Maribyrnong (ME) (Defence Explosive Factory Maribyrnong) – Maribyrnong; Melbourne, Victoria (1908?–1989). Complex was built from 1909 to 1912, originally to make commercial explosives for the mining industry. Its high-volume war production of explosives in World Wars One and Two led to the "Made in Maribyrnong" moniker for Australian-made artillery shells.
  - Explosives Factory Maribyrnong – Cordite Annexe (MEC) (1912-?) – Manufactured cordite propellant for cartridges and shells.
  - Explosives Factory Maribyrnong – Pyrotechnics Annexe (MEP) – Manufactured Explosive, Incendiary and Smoke shell projectile fillings.
  - Ordnance Factory Maribyrnong (MO or OFM) – Maribyrnong; Melbourne, Victoria. Manufactured artillery pieces (OFM) and assembled shells (MO). It also made chargers for rifle ammunition and metal links for disintegrating machinegun belts.
- Explosives Factory Salisbury (MS) (Salisbury Explosives Factory) – Salisbury, South Australia (in the area now known as Edinburgh)
  - Ammunition Annexe Salisbury (MS) – Salisbury, South Australia (1943–1944). Assembled some .303 G II (.303 Tracer Mark 2) rifle ammunition exclusively using components from SAAF No.3 (Hendon). Closed because most of the 4 million rounds produced there proved defective. All tracer projectiles used by the Hendon factory were filled at Salisbury.
  - Munitions Factory Port Pirie (MSP) – Port Pirie, South Australia. Manufactured shells for 25-pounder Q.F. guns.
- Explosives Factory Villawood (MV) – Villawood, New South Wales. Converted ammonia into nitric acid, which was then used to make TNT and Tetryl.
- Munitions Factory Albury (MFA) – Albury, New South Wales. Manufactured shell fuses.
- Munitions Factory Broken Hill (MFB) – Broken Hill, New South Wales. Manufactured shell fuses.
- Munitions Factory Goulburn (MFG) – Goulburn, New South Wales. Manufactured shell fuses and Armor-Piercing and Tracer projectiles for 25-pounder Q.F. guns and 20mm Oerlikon cannons.
- Munitions Factory Wagga Wagga (MFW) – Wagga Wagga, New South Wales. Manufactured shell fuses.
- Munitions Powdermill Mildura (MPM) – Mildura, Victoria. Manufactured primers and gunpowder.
- Munitions Powdermill Tamworth (MPT) – Tamworth, New South Wales. Manufactured primers and gunpowder.
- Munitions Filling Factory St.Marys (MY) – St.Marys, Penrith, New South Wales (1941–1993?). Filled cartridges, mortar bombs, shells, and pyrotechnics.
- Munitions Supply Laboratories Maribyrnong (ML) – Maribyrnong; Melbourne, Victoria (1922 - 1948). Performed research and development of ammunition, explosives and weaponry. Was renamed and reorganized as the Defence Research Laboratories (1948 - 1953), Defence Standards Laboratories (1953 - 1974), and Materials Research Laboratories (1974 - 1994).
- Ordnance Factory Echuca – Echuca, Victoria. Manufactured ball-bearings (beginning in June, 1945) and roller bearings (beginning in August 1945) – the only such factory in Australia at the time.

== Post-war production (1945–2006) ==
In 1945, the facilities at Hendon (MH & MJ), Rocklea (MQ), and Welshpool (MW) were closed, followed by the original old Footscray ammunition factory (MF). The second Footscray facility (MG) was later redesignated to MF in 1949.

In 1986 Albion Explosives Factory was closed due to suburban encroachment. Production was moved to Mulwala Explosives Factory (MEF), New South Wales in 1988. Mulwala Explosives Factory was privatised in 2011 and then bought out by Thales Australia Ltd.

In 1989 the Australian government nationalised munitions manufacture under a government-owned company called Australian Defence Industries (Ltd.). Its first round of business was to consolidate and regulate ordnance production. The Explosives Factory Maribyrnong complex was closed during restructuring later that year.

Production at Ammunition Factory Footscray (AFF) was slowly wound down beginning in 1991 until it was closed in 1994. A new factory run by Australian Defence Industries was opened elsewhere at Benalla, Victoria. When ADI was bought out by Thales in 2006, ADI was renamed Thales Australia Ltd. In 2012 Thales Australia spun off its factories at Benalla and Mulwala to form the Australian Munitions group. It is also responsible for managing any Australian military logistical functions involving munitions.

Benalla still uses the ADI headstamp from 1994 to as recently as 2014. Production of 5.56mm NATO F1 Ball resumed in 1995 and F1A1 Ball began in c.2010. Both cartridges are similar, but the F1A1 ammo has a green meplat tip and the headstamp has dimples at the 3 and 9 o'clock position (a peculiarity of the electric bunter used by the new cartridge-making machinery). 5.56mm NATO F3 Blank production began in 1998 and is produced in batches every three years. Production of .50 BMG M33 Ball began in 1999 and 7.62mm NATO F4 Ball began in 2008. Since they now only produce Ball ammunition, headstamps since 1995 only include the contractor code at 12 o'clock and the two-digit production year at 6 o'clock. It also produces 20mm autocannon rounds and will possibly begin production of 81mm mortar shells as part of a 5-year reorganization plan.

Since 2014 Australian Munitions produces civilian market ammunition under the Australian Outback brand. Civilian ammunition is in .223 Remington, .243 Winchester, .300 Blackout, and .308 Winchester and military surplus is in 5.56mm NATO F1A1 Ball and 7.62mm NATO F4 Ball. The civilian cartridges use Sierra- and Swift-brand match and hunting bullets with a special high-temperature-tolerant propellant.
