= Lyell McEwin Hospital =

- Northern Adelaide Local Health Network

Geography
- Location: Elizabeth Vale, Adelaide, South Australia, Australia
- Coordinates: 34.7478°S 138.6651°E

Organisation
- Care system: Public Medicare (AU)
- Type: Teaching, Training, General
- Affiliated university: University of Adelaide; University of South Australia

Services
- Emergency department: Yes

History
- Founded: 22 April 1959

Links
- Website: SA Health
- Lists: Hospitals in Australia

The Lyell McEwin Hospital (LMH) is a tertiary acute care hospital located in Adelaide, South Australia. It is one of the three major tertiary hospitals servicing the SA community. LMH provides comprehensive medical, surgical, diagnostic, emergency and support services to a population over 300,000 residents primarily in Adelaide's Northern and North Eastern suburbs. It is named after Sir Alexander Lyell McEwin.

LMH operates as a major teaching institution affiliated with the University of Adelaide and the University of South Australia, playing a vital role in medical teaching and research.

LMH is recognised as a leading provider for surgical training in South Australia, where general trainees in the surgical stream participate in advanced procedures, gradually gaining independence and responsibility as they progress through their training. The hospital is accredited for advanced-level training through the Royal Australasian College of Surgeons (RACS), adhering to the training standards set by RACS and providing pathways to pursue fellowships in various surgical specialities. Trainees receive mentorship from experienced surgeons, benefiting from one-on-one guidance in the operating room, structured feedback, and participation in teaching rounds and case discussions. This makes it a well-regarded site for doctors and trainees to develop their surgical skills.

In addition, LMH provides new mothers and their babies with the Mothercarer Postnatal Support Service, and has Baby Friendly Health Initiative Accreditation according to World Health Organization guidelines.

== Redevelopment ==
In 2002 LMH began a $314 million, three-part redevelopment program as part of the State Government's modernisation of the state's health system. In October 2003, Premier Mike Rann and Health Minister Lea Stevens opened new maternity, obstetrics and gynaecology sections, as well as a new women's and children's area.

Stage A of the hospital's redevelopment was completed in 2004 and replaced much of the hospital's core clinical and support infrastructure. In April 2005, LMH opened six new operating theatres, a new Emergency Department, new medical imaging facilities and women's health consulting and treatment facilities.

Key elements of the Stage B redevelopment, included a 50-bed, acute and aged care mental health facility, a Radiation Oncology unit, enhanced medical and palliative services, the establishment of an extended emergency care unit, day surgery and ambulatory services and the expansion of support services. In August 2008, new pathology, oncology and gastroenterology units were opened.

Stage C of the hospital's redevelopment, included a multi-level staff and visitor car park, completed in 2010, and an additional 96 inpatient beds. Other improvements in the redevelopment included a helipad facility, teaching and research spaces, a new cardiac catheter laboratory, a second CT scanner and installation of a new MRI machine.

== Services ==
=== Surgical services ===
LMH provides emergency, complex and multi day surgery, along with day surgery and other procedures. In 2016, a comprehensive 24-hour, seven-day orthopaedic trauma surgery service was expanded at LMH. Radiology services are contracted out to Radiology SA.

=== Inpatient services ===
LMH has the following inpatient services:

Critical Care

- Intensive Care
- Coronary care and cardiac step down
- Emergency extended care

Medicine

- Renal and transplantation
- Cardiology (including nuclear cardiology)
- Respiratory and Sleep medicine (including bronchial valve therapy)
- Stroke/Neurology
- Gastroenterology
- Hematology
- Diabetes and Endocrinology
- General Medicine
- Rheumatology
- Infectious Diseases
- Paediatric
- Palliative Care

Surgical

- Vascular Surgery
- Upper Gastrointestinal (including bariatric surgery)
- Breast/Endocrine Surgery
- Colorectal Surgery
- Plastic and Reconstructive Surgery (including cosmetic and burn care)
- Trauma Surgery
- Urological Surgery (including minimally invasive and robotic surgery)
- Orthopaedics/Fracture (including laparoscopic, robotic surgery, kinematic alignment strategies)
- Paediatric Surgery
- General Surgery
- Ear, Nose and Throat
- Ophthalmology
- Peri-Operative

Women's Health

- Antenatal
- Gynaecology/Colposcopy
- Perinatal Mental Health

Multidisciplinary and miscellaneous

- Adult and Older Persons’ Mental Health
- Cancer Services (Chemotherapy and Radiotherapy)
- Allied Health
- Chronic Disease Management
- Diabetes Education Centre
- Interdisciplinary High-Risk Diabetes Foot Clinic

=== Outpatient services ===
Lyell McEwin Hospital has the following outpatient services:

Medical

- Cardiology/Interventional Cardiology/Electrophysiological studies
- Diabetes and Endocrinology
- Gastroenterology
- General Medicine
- Haematology
- Hospital at Home
- Infectious Diseases
- Medical Oncology
- Neonatal
- Orthogeriatrics
- Renal Dialysis
- Renal Medicine
- Respiratory Medicine and Bronchoscopies
- Stroke/Neurology

Surgical

- Breast/Endocrine Surgery
- Colorectal Surgery
- Ear Nose and Throat Surgery
- Ophthalmology
- Orthopaedics
- Paediatric Surgery
- Peri-Operative Medicine
- Plastic Surgery
- Upper Gastrointestinal Surgery
- Urology
- Vascular Surgery

Women's Health

- Obstetrics
- Obstetric Medicine

Multidisciplinary and miscellaneous

- Allied Health
- Early Rehabilitation
- Emergency Medicine and Surgery
- Medical Imaging
- Pathology
- Radiation Oncology

== See also ==
- List of hospitals in Australia
