= Broadmeadows railway station, Adelaide =

Railway station in Adelaide, South Australia

Broadmeadows
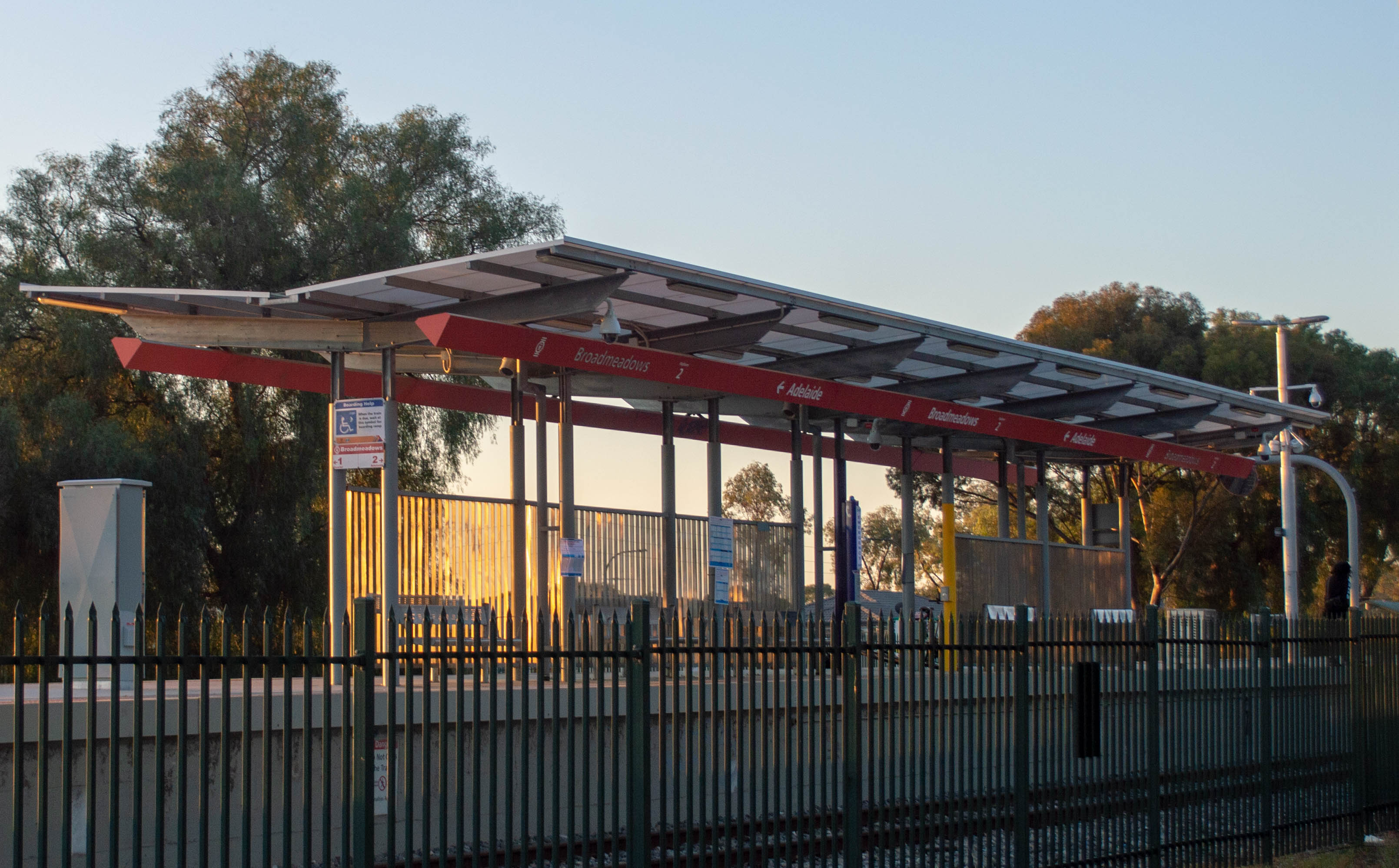
- Northbound view of Platform 2, July 2020

General information
- Location: Tisbury Street, Elizabeth North
- Coordinates: 34°41′45″S 138°40′27″E
- Owner: Department for Infrastructure & Transport
- Operator: Adelaide Metro
- Line: Gawler
- Distance: 28.2 km from Adelaide
- Platforms: 2
- Tracks: 2
- Connections: None

Construction
- Structure type: Ground
- Parking: Yes
- Cycle facilities: No
- Accessible: Yes

Other information
- Station code: 16498 (to City); 18553 (to Gawler Central)
- Website: Adelaide Metro

History
- Opened: 1950s
- Rebuilt: 2011

Services
Preceding station	Adelaide Metro	Following station
Womma towards Adelaide	Gawler line	Smithfield towards Gawler Central
Location

Broadmeadows railway station is located on the Gawler line. It is situated on the boundary between the northern Adelaide suburbs of Davoren Park and Elizabeth North, and is located 28.2 kilometres (17.5 mi) from Adelaide station.

== History ==
Broadmeadows opened in the 1950s, and was known as Elizabeth North railway station until 1961.

It once had a ticket office and toilets on either side of a shelter, but they were demolished in the 1980s, with the shelter being demolished in the late 1990s or early 2000s, and replaced with a much smaller shelter. The underground pedestrian tunnel was closed and demolished in the late 1990s due to concerns of safety and vandalism. In 2014, the station was upgraded with the platform extended and raised, a new shelter built, and new lighting installed.

== Platforms and Services ==
Broadmeadows has an island platform and is serviced by Adelaide Metro. Trains are scheduled every 30 minutes, seven days a week.

Platform	Destination
1	Gawler and Gawler Central
2	Adelaide
