= Stuart O'Grady Bikeway =

Path in Adelaide, South Australia

Coordinates: 34.6039114°S 138.7239947°E

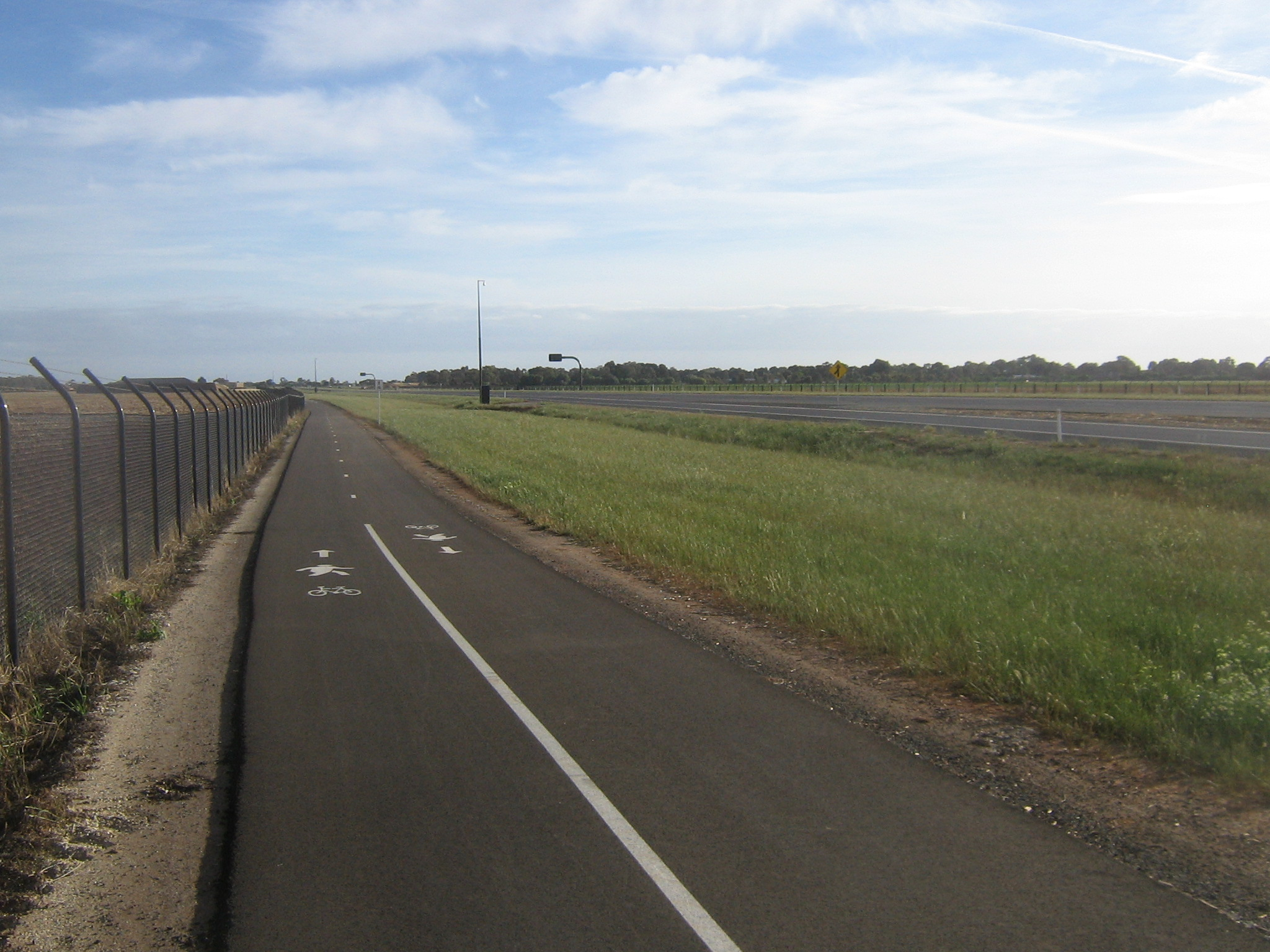
Stuart O'Grady Bikeway south of Curtis Road

The Stuart O'Grady Bikeway is a 23 kilometres (14 mi) shared path for cycling, walking and other non-motorised vehicles, in the northern suburbs of Adelaide, following the eastern side of the Max Fatchen Expressway. The northeastern end is adjacent to the on ramp from Two Wells Road to the Gawler Bypass. The southwestern end is adjacent to Port Wakefield Road. It is named after Stuart O'Grady, Adelaide born winner of the Paris-Roubaix, Olympic Gold medallist, and inaugural Tour Down Under winner.

== Description ==
The bikeway crosses roads at-level near each of the five expressway exits. At two of these junctions, the bikeway crosses two roads — At Two Wells Road it also crosses Wingate Road which provides a local road crossing of the Gawler River and at Womma Road, the bikeway also crosses the north-south Heaslip Road. Several of the minor roads that were cut to create the Max Fatchen Expressway have a pedestrian and bike gate in the fence to provide access to the shared path from roads that do not have direct access to the expressway.

The expressway, and hence bikeway, is located west of most of the suburbs it passes near. As a consequence, it can be quite windy due to being exposed on the Adelaide Plains with little tree cover in some areas. Adjacent land includes some almond and olive orchards, but also market gardens, vineyards, cereal crops and vacant land. It crosses the former Smithfield Magazine munitions store south of Curtis Road, and some of the historic buildings remain.

There is no water or food available anywhere along the route, but there are two picnic shelters. One is in a planted native garden on the north side of the Gawler River. The other is north of Womma Road, not far from a small cemetery and ruins of the Zoar Bible Christian chapel which had served the Penfield community. There are interpretive signs at these landmarks and all of the bridges to cross the Expressway, which are named after famous military battles that involved Australian forces.

== Proposed extension ==
The Stuart O'Grady Bikeway is proposed to be extended by 16 kilometres (9.9 mi) next to the Northern Connector to reach the junction of Salisbury Highway and North-South Motorway by the end of 2019. A new path parallel to the Port River Expressway will also be built, completing a shared cycling and walking track between Gawler and Port Adelaide by the end of 2019.
