= Penfield 1 railway station =

Former railway station in South Australia, Australia

Coordinates: 34°44′17″S 138°38′8″E

Penfield 1 railway station was located on the Penfield line located in what is now the northern Adelaide suburb of Edinburgh. It was located 23.2 kilometres from Adelaide station. The station opened between 1940 and 1942 and had a platform which was 213.4 metres long. The station closed on 4 January 1991, along with Penfield 2 station and the line. The station has since been demolished.

Preceding station	Disused railways	Following station
Hilra	Penfield railway line	Penfield 2
