= Angle Vale =

- Town
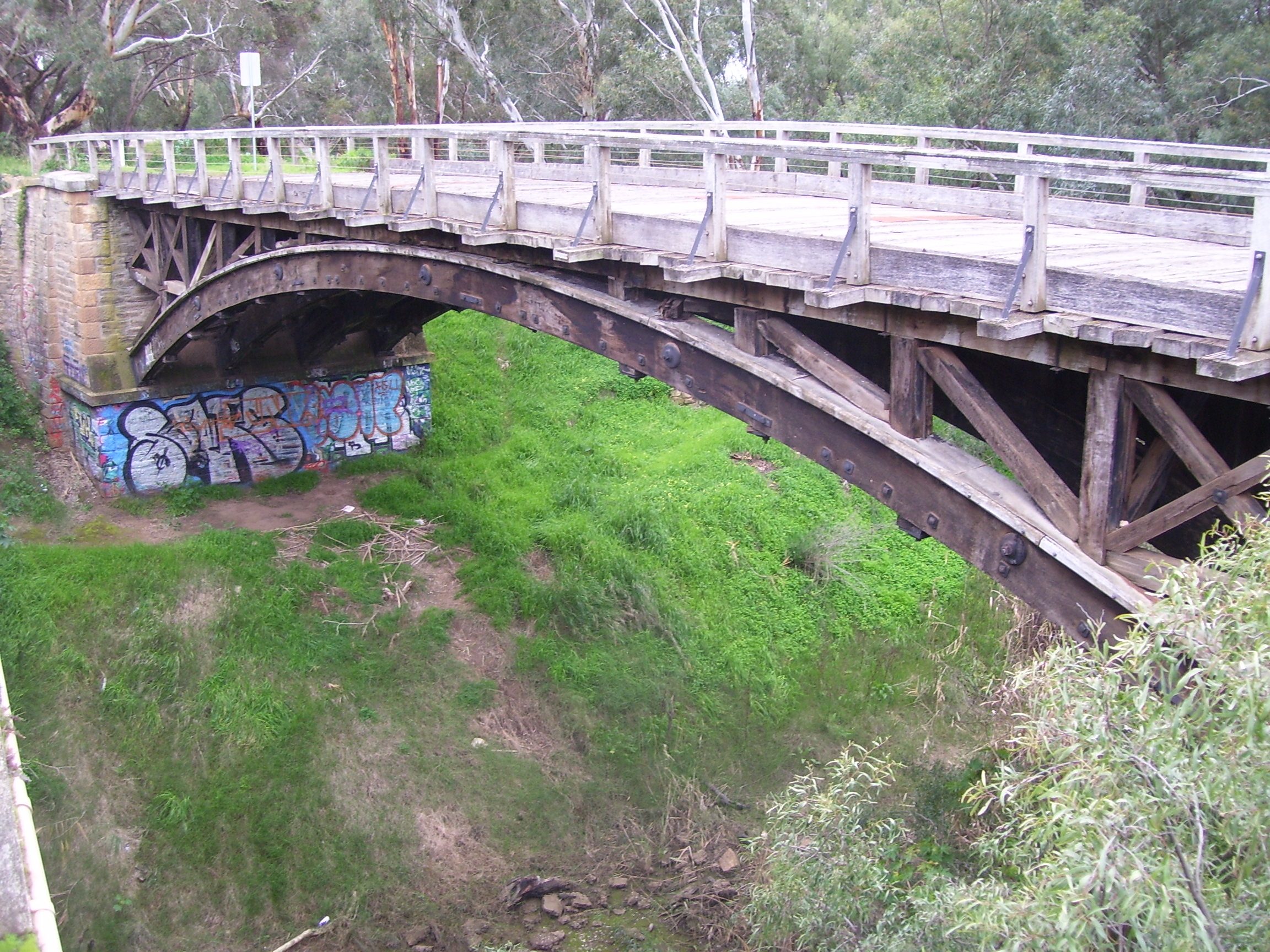
- Angle Vale Bridge

- Coordinates: 34.642°S 138.647°E
- Country: Australia
- State: South Australia
- LGA: City of Playford
- Location: 31 km (19 mi) North of Adelaide; 12 km (7.5 mi) West of Gawler

Government
  - State electorate: Taylor
  - Federal division: Spence

Population
  - Total: 4,088 (UCL 2021)
- Postcode: 5117
Localities around Angle Vale
Lewiston	Gawler River	Evanston Gardens
Virginia	Angle Vale	Munno Para Downs
Penfield Gardens	MacDonald Park	Andrews Farm

Angle Vale is a semi-rural town on the Adelaide Plains between Gawler and Virginia in South Australia. It is steadily being surrounded by Adelaide's suburban sprawl. It is close to many vineyards and farms. The town includes Trinity College's Gawler River campus, Angle Vale Primary School and Riverbanks College. Some students travel to nearby towns or to Gawler.

== History ==
Angle Vale emerged organically as settlers began occupying land along the Gawler River. Located on Section 4140 of the Gawler Plains, this area was initially granted to land dealer James White in September 1852 and later sold to Benjamin Heaslip. The community of Angle Vale, predominantly Methodist, saw the construction of the first Bible Christian Chapel on the Gawler Plains in 1854. Reverend Samuel Keen chose the land formed by Heaslip Rd and Angle Vale Rd for the chapel, naming it Ebenezer.

Angle Vale Post Office opened on 1 October 1866, before the introduction of a mail service, the area was also referred to as Ebenezer, following the construction of the chapel, a day school commenced operations and in 1924, a church hall was erected along with the establishment of a Band of Hope society, by 1883 the chapel was renamed the Angle Vale Methodist Church, though it has since been converted into a residential dwelling, adjacent to Angle Vale lies the Carclew Primitive Methodist Church, constructed in 1870 as the successor to an earlier church built in 1850, the land for the original church was generously donated by early settler Jonathan Roberts, who named his farm Carclew after his hometown in Cornwall, England, a name subsequently adopted by the church.

The intersection of Heaslip Rd, Fradd Rd, and Angle Vale Rd defines the Angle, the town is situated 8km North East of Virginia, South Australia. George Crisp laid out the town of Angle Vale on a portion of section 4140 in the Hundred of Munno Para in 1868, it was officially recognized as a suburb of Adelaide on April 14, 1983.

=== Angle Vale Bridge ===
The historic Angle Vale Bridge, which crosses the Gawler River, holds a place on both the state heritage register and the register of national estate, designed by C.F.G Ashwin of the Central Roads Board, construction on the bridge commenced in 1876. A substantial span of 85 feet was necessary to ensure the waterway remained unobstructed, completed in November 1876 after nine months of construction, the bridge served its purpose until 1966 when a new bridge was built adjacent to the original structure, restoration efforts for the original bridge were initiated in 1988 as part of a Bicentennial project, only the remnants of the bridge's foundation serve as a reminder of its historical significance.

== Notable people ==
Revren Samuel Keen was born in Devonshire, England in 1818 and spent some time at the Theological Institution in that county. Joining the Bible Christian ministry in 1848, he embarked on travels associated with the South Devon Mission and the Chatham Circuit for a two-year period. His arrival in Adelaide was in March 1853, where he was initially stationed at Gawler Plains, establishing a circuit and remaining in the area for seven years. In 1860, he relocated to Adelaide city, assuming the role of pastor of the Central Circuit until 1864 when he transitioned to Auburn, overseeing the circuit there for three years. Returning to the Gawler Circuit in 1867, he stayed for a similar duration before moving to Willunga in 1870, there he took on the responsibility of Port Elliot, Willunga, and Clarendon Circuits. Mr. Keen played a prominent role in the administration of the church affairs of the Bible Christian denomination in the colony, serving on the district committee. Known for his dynamic preaching and impactful platform speeches, he died in Willunga at the age of fifty-three on 21 June 1871.
