= Virginia, South Australia =

Virginia
- Suburb
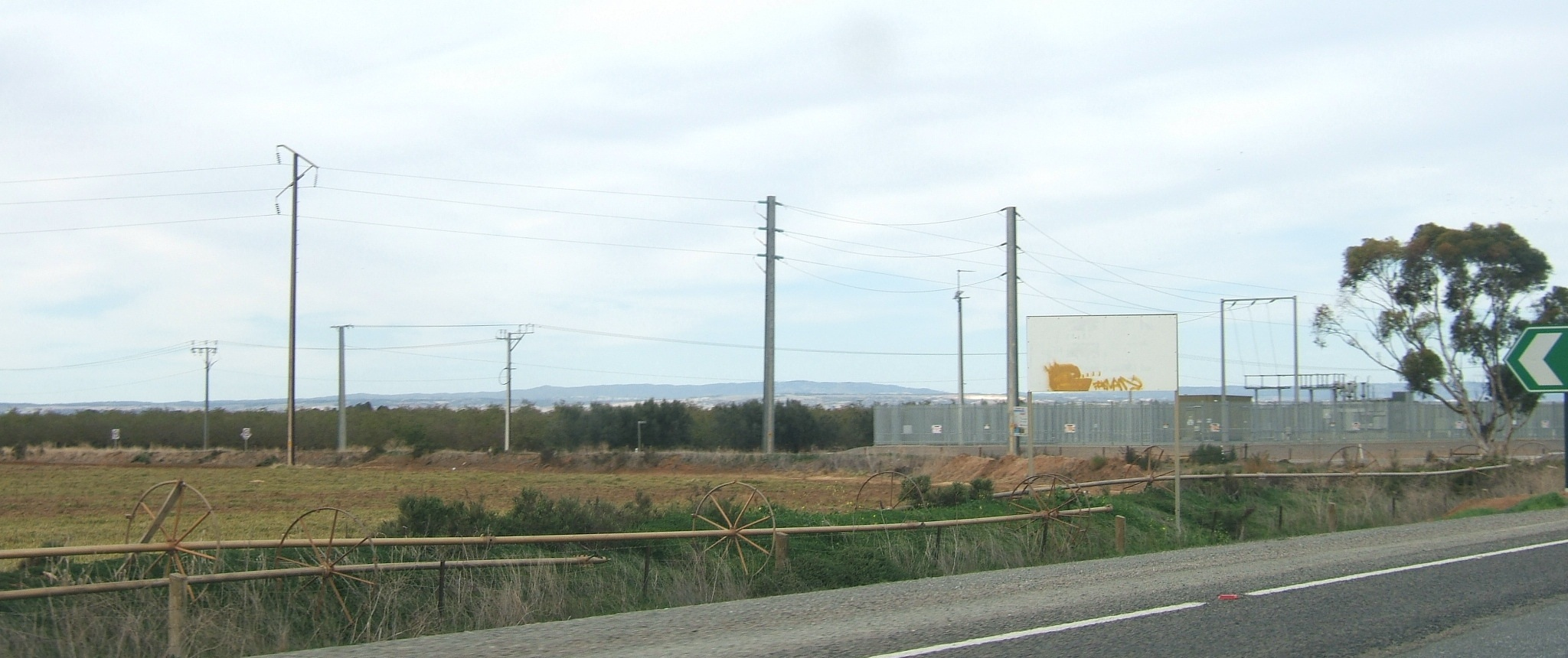
- Power substation in Virginia

- Interactive map of Virginia
- Coordinates: 34.668°S 138.561°E
- Country: Australia
- State: South Australia
- City: Adelaide
- LGA: City of Playford
- Location: 15 km (9.3 mi) NW of Elizabeth

Government
  - State electorate: Taylor
  - Federal division: Spence
- Elevation: 16 m (52 ft)

Population
  - Total: 2,759 (SAL 2021)
- Postcode: 5120
Suburbs around Virginia
Riverlea Park	Two Wells	Lewiston
Buckland Park	Virginia	Penfield Gardens
	Waterloo Corner	Penfield

Virginia is a suburb on the rural outskirts of Adelaide, the capital city of South Australia. Port Wakefield Road, the main highway taking traffic to the north of Adelaide, passes through the area and used to pass straight through Virginia. Market gardening is the main activity there.

== History ==
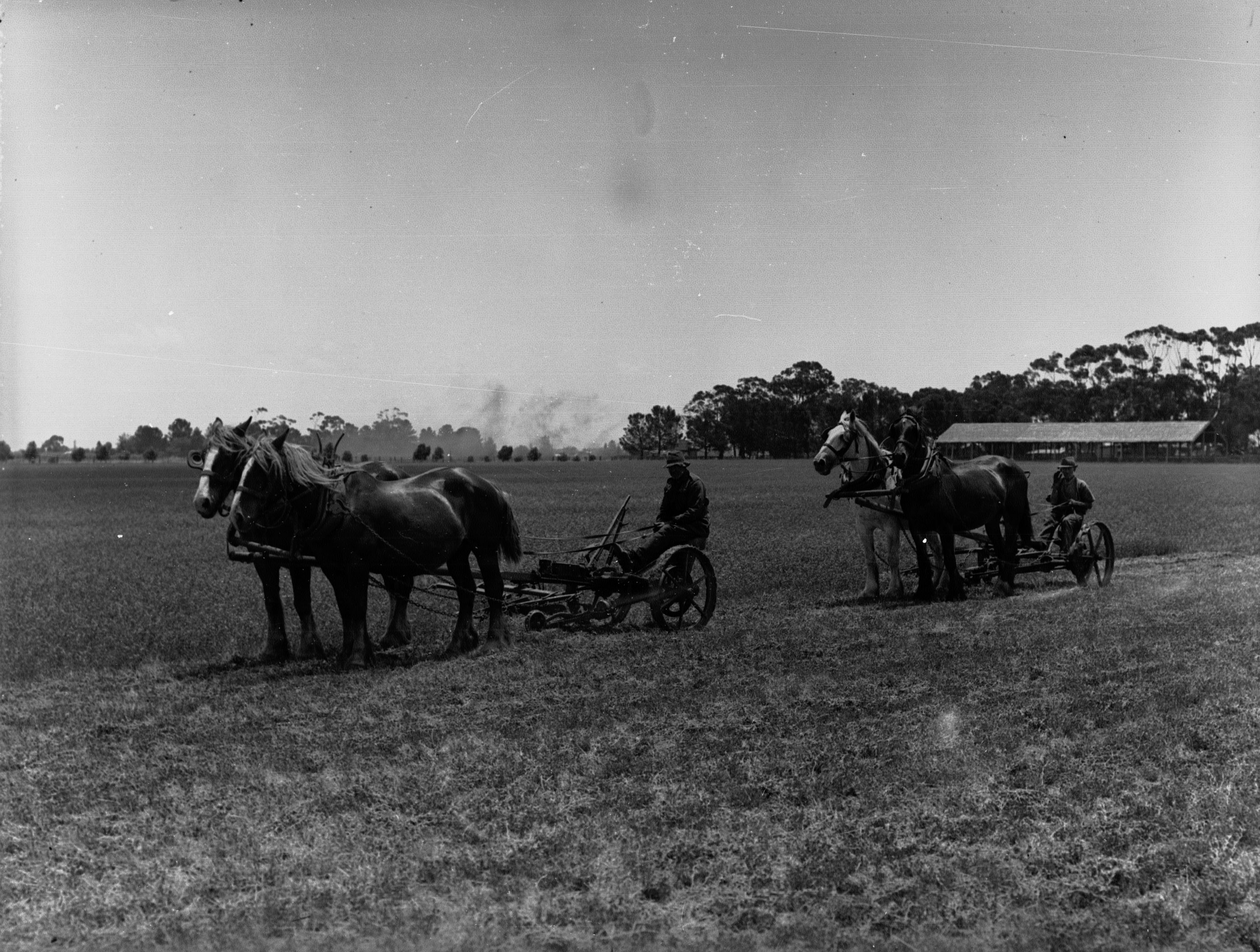
Lucerne cutting at Virginia, ca. 1925

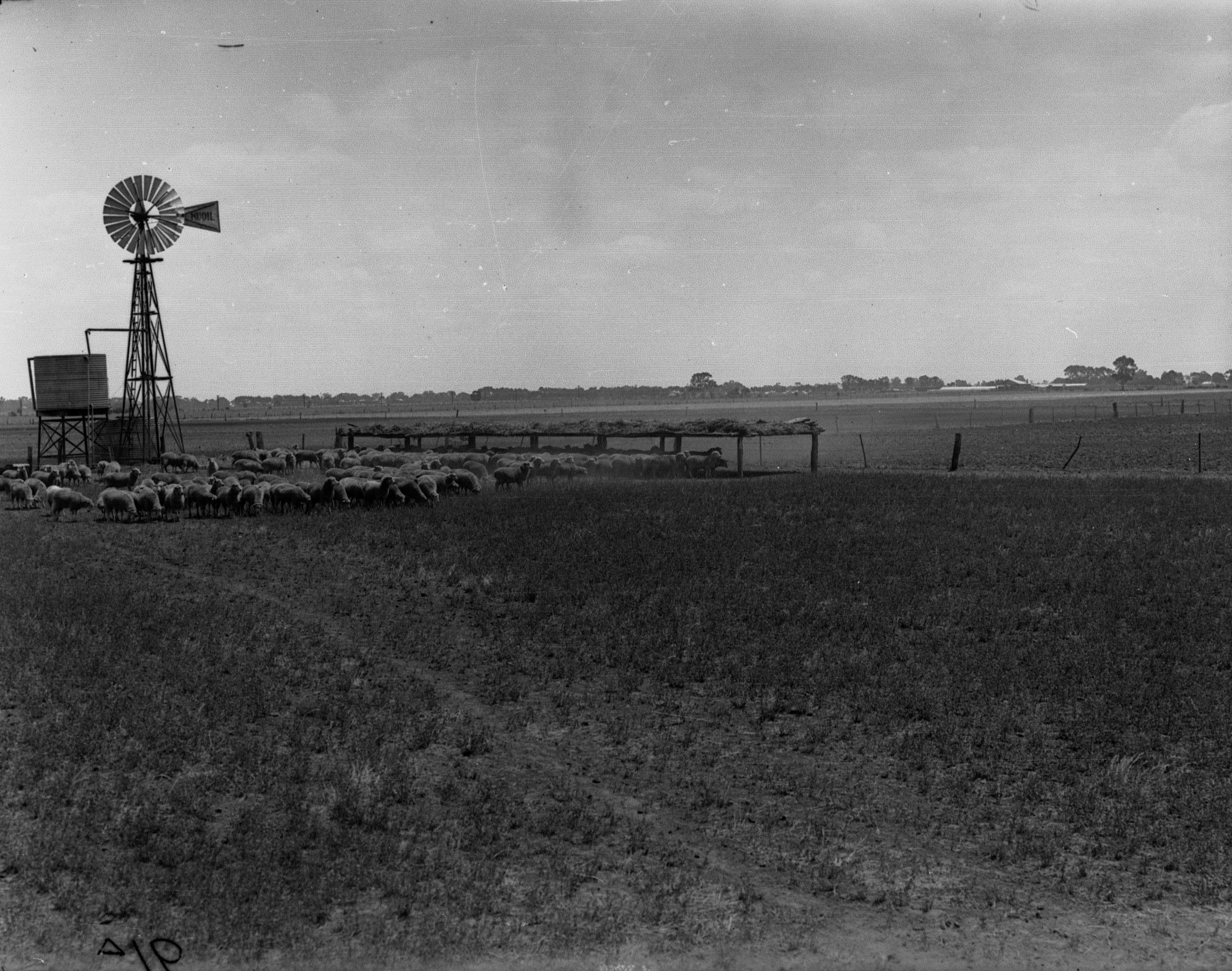
Sheep near the windmill of a farm at Virginia, ca. 1924

Virginia was first surveyed and established by Daniel Brady (born 1797, died 1889), a wealthy Irish settler who had arrived in South Australia on the barque, DIADEM, in 1840 with his wife, Rose (née Rudden), and their six children. Daniel was one of the first settlers in the area with a land grant of 100 acres in Section 2186n, halfway between Dry Creek and the Little Para River in October 1848. He named the area Cavan after his home county in Ireland (cf. Virginia, County Cavan) and set aside section 176 and 3035 for the township of Virginia which he also named.

Daniel Brady built the Wheatsheaf Hotel, the first prominent building erected at Virginia, in 1854. The hotel was there for four years before Brady sought and was granted permission for the township. He also built the Cross Keys Hotel on the Lower North Road which served travelers on their way north via the Glue Pot (a swampy section of the North Road to the south and west, near Dry Creek Inn) to Salisbury and Moonta.

Many of the early settlers to the Virginia district came from the British Isles and amongst them the Irish escaping the Great Famine. Virginia became well known as an Irish settlement. Early settlers worked long and hard hours to clear thick bushland in the area. Initially wheat was one of the major crops planted at Virginia until Adelaide required large amounts of hay to feed the increasing number of horses being used for transportation. Before the railway line to Virginia was opened in 1916 people would travel through on the Cobb and Co Stage Coach as Virginia was a staging point. The journey to Adelaide would take all day.

Virginia continued to develop and by 1858 a small shop and a post office were in operation with Virginia Post Office having opened around October 1856. Our Lady of the Assumption Catholic Church was built in 1861 on land donated by Daniel Brady and is National Trust listed. One of the features of the church is the hand crafted Italian and Irish marble altar which arrived from England in 1865. Even though Brady was Catholic he donated a block of land for the building of the Bible Christian Chapel named Bethlehem, in 1858 (National Trust listed). This church was used as a school for many years before the public school was established. A new Methodist Church (National Trust listed) was built alongside in 1937. In 1871 there was a blacksmith and by 1873 St Augustine's Church of England was built. Soon after saw the building of the first formal school.

The Virginia Institute was officially opened 9 November 1908 and lit by gas lamps – over the years the institute has been used for a variety of purposes from church celebrations, dances, fetes, library and is still used by the community. On the land next to the Institute approximately 17 trees were planted on 1 September 1916 in memory of the soldiers who fought in World War I. A remount depot was built by the Army during World War I, as a place to train horses for cavalry units. The depot was located near the five corners intersection.

== Motorsport ==
Virginia is home to the Adelaide International Raceway, a 2.41-kilometre-long (1.50 mi) road racing circuit which opened in 1972 and incorporates an internationally recognised drag racing strip and a 1/2-mile (805 metres (880 yd)) slightly banked paved oval speedway as part of the main circuit. It is also home to the 430 metres (470 yd) Speedway City, Adelaide's main Dirt track racing car speedway which is located adjacent to the Raceway and was opened on 2 November 1979. Both AIR and Speedway City are located approximately 3 km south of the Virginia township.

From 1969 to 1974, Virginia was home to the Thunderbird Raceway, a dirt track speedway located at the towns Recreation Reserve (now the local Australian rules football and cricket oval). Originally known as the Virginia Fairgrounds Speedway when it opened in 1969 (work had begun in 1968), the name was changed to Thunderbird Raceway in 1971 under the promotion of Doug Sunstrom who had taken over from the original promoters, the Bevan family. Sunstrom promoted the speedway as a 1/2-mile track, though it was closer to 1/3 mile (500 metres (550 yd)) in length. Racing at Thunderbird took place during the winter months to complement Adelaide's then major summer speedway Rowley Park.

== Town expansion ==
The City of Playford proposes an expansion of up to 580 hectares to the north, west and south of the existing township. The proposed plans would expand Virginia to Angle Vale Road in the north, Port Wakefield Road in the west and the intersection of Old Port Wakefield and Port Wakefield roads in the south.

Part of this expansion is Virginia Grove, the newly developed award winning estate located between Old Port Wakefield and Port Wakefield roads.

City of Playford has secured funds from the Federal and State Governments to start the Virginia Main Street Upgrade project, which is expected to cost $8.8 millions. Work is anticipated to start in 2022.
