= Edinburgh, South Australia =

Edinburgh
- Suburb
- Interactive map of Edinburgh
- Coordinates: 34.716755679879945°S 138.6330890677181°E
- Country: Australia
- State: South Australia
- City: Adelaide
- LGA: City of Salisbury

Government
  - Federal division: Spence

Population
  - Total: 376 (SAL 2021)
- Postcode: 5111
Suburbs around Edinburgh
Penfield	Penfield	Edinburgh North
Penfield	Edinburgh	Elizabeth; Elizabeth South
Penfield	Direk; Salisbury North	Salisbury; Elizabeth Vale

Edinburgh is an outer northern suburb of Adelaide, South Australia in the City of Salisbury. The suburb was created in 1997, on land straddling Penfield and Salisbury, that was compulsorily acquired by the Commonwealth Government in 1940 in order to manufacture munitions for the war effort during World War II, and later used for a number of defence-related establishments.

The suburb is dominated by the RAAF Base Edinburgh, but also includes the industrial precinct of Edinburgh Parks.

== History ==
The area, as with all of the Adelaide Plains, lies within the traditional lands of the Kaurna people.

=== Salisbury Explosives Factory ===
Once a rural area, this changed in 1940, after a large amount of land in the area between Penfield and Salisbury was compulsorily acquired by the Australian Government's Department of Munitions in 1940 to establish a munitions factory. Construction of the Salisbury Explosives Factory (officially, the No.2 Explosives and Filling Factory; colloquially "the Munitions") began in November 1940. The architect Herbert Jory was engaged by the Department of Munitions to oversee the building of the factory, which at its height employed 3000 labourers and tradesmen seven days a week. The factory was completed within a year.

The factory was one of many facilities created to ensure supplies for six munitions factories established across Australia by the national government during World War II. The site was chosen because of "its strategic position and its proximity to rail transport, and to a water supply and labour". The factory complex included 1,405 buildings, and during wartime employed between 3,000 and 6,000 people. A new railway line serviced the facilities.

=== Other defence establishments ===
- The Long Range Weapons Establishment (LRWE) was established in 1947.
- The High Speed Aerodynamics Laboratory, Propulsion Research Laboratory and the Electronics Research Laboratory, (collectively known as the Chemistry & Physics Research Laboratory) in 1949.
- The establishment of the RAAF base was established in 1955.

The LWRE and laboratories became the Weapons Research Establishment (WRE) in 1955, the Defence Science & Technology Organisation (DSTO) in 1974, and the Defence Science and Technology Group (DST) in 2015. It is now an industrial suburb, but is still dominated by RAAF Base Edinburgh, the DST Edinburgh site, with a few remaining sheep-grazing paddocks.

=== Suburb (1997) ===
The suburb was created in 1997 when it was split from the suburb of Salisbury, when the Australian Government decided that the Australian Department of Defence would rationalise the then "DSTO Salisbury" site and sell off about 70% of the site, and surrounding "Defence-owned" crown land, to form the "Edinburgh Parks" industrial estate.

== Description ==
In addition to the RAAF base and the DST Group site, the suburb is home to several of defence contractors, a number of automotive component and parts manufacturers (which supported the Elizabeth Holden manufacturing plant until it closed in 2017), and other industries (for example, a major Coles Supermarkets distribution centre), as well as the Penfield Golf Club golf course, a model railway track, a model boat facility, a pistol range, gemology clubrooms, and a few remaining flocks of sheep.

== Edinburgh Parks ==
The City of Salisbury's website stated in 2013: "Edinburgh Parks is one of Australia's largest advanced industrial precincts and has more than 300 hectares of fully developed land available... It is a "$1.9 billion investment and comprises four precincts designated for aerospace and manufacturing, defence technology, logistics support and automotive industries... Edinburgh Parks industrial blocks are among the best value industrial land in Australia. The site is ideally located in a major industrial growth corridor connected by Adelaide's new northern super highway system."

Organisations established in the area include BAE Systems Australia, DHL Inghams, Detroit Diesel, Coles Supermarkets Distribution Centre, The National Military Vehicle Museum and Lockheed Martin Australia. The City of Salisbury estimates that over 3,000 jobs have been created in the area through the creation of Edinburgh Parks.

The "Invest Northern Adelaide" website, a collaboration of the cities of Playford, Salisbury, and Tea Tree Gully, makes similar glowing claims.

== Climate ==
Climate data for RAAF Base Edinburgh (1991–2020)
Month	Jan	Feb	Mar	Apr	May	Jun	Jul	Aug	Sep	Oct	Nov	Dec	Year
Record high °C (°F)	47.5 (117.5)	45.0 (113.0)	42.3 (108.1)	39.0 (102.2)	31.2 (88.2)	27.0 (80.6)	24.2 (75.6)	30.8 (87.4)	34.9 (94.8)	39.9 (103.8)	44.5 (112.1)	46.6 (115.9)	47.5 (117.5)
Mean daily maximum °C (°F)	30.5 (86.9)	30.1 (86.2)	27.0 (80.6)	23.4 (74.1)	19.2 (66.6)	16.1 (61.0)	15.5 (59.9)	16.6 (61.9)	19.4 (66.9)	22.9 (73.2)	26.2 (79.2)	28.2 (82.8)	22.9 (73.2)
Daily mean °C (°F)	23.6 (74.5)	23.5 (74.3)	20.7 (69.3)	17.6 (63.7)	14.2 (57.6)	11.5 (52.7)	10.8 (51.4)	11.5 (52.7)	13.8 (56.8)	16.6 (61.9)	19.7 (67.5)	21.6 (70.9)	17.1 (62.8)
Mean daily minimum °C (°F)	16.7 (62.1)	16.8 (62.2)	14.4 (57.9)	11.8 (53.2)	9.2 (48.6)	6.9 (44.4)	6.2 (43.2)	6.4 (43.5)	8.2 (46.8)	10.3 (50.5)	13.1 (55.6)	14.9 (58.8)	11.3 (52.3)
Record low °C (°F)	8.1 (46.6)	7.7 (45.9)	5.7 (42.3)	−0.1 (31.8)	1.0 (33.8)	−2.0 (28.4)	−1.2 (29.8)	−0.9 (30.4)	0.4 (32.7)	1.6 (34.9)	3.4 (38.1)	5.7 (42.3)	−2.0 (28.4)
Average precipitation mm (inches)	21.4 (0.84)	19.4 (0.76)	21.2 (0.83)	29.0 (1.14)	42.4 (1.67)	54.5 (2.15)	49.4 (1.94)	47.4 (1.87)	47.4 (1.87)	32.8 (1.29)	24.9 (0.98)	26.4 (1.04)	416.2 (16.39)
Average precipitation days (≥ 1 mm)	2.4	2.1	3.2	4.4	7.3	9.3	9.6	9.1	7.7	5.6	4.3	3.5	68.4
Average dew point °C (°F)	9.8 (49.6)	10.0 (50.0)	9.5 (49.1)	8.1 (46.6)	8.1 (46.6)	7.3 (45.1)	6.6 (43.9)	6.3 (43.3)	7.0 (44.6)	6.8 (44.2)	7.6 (45.7)	8.5 (47.3)	8.0 (46.4)
Source: National Oceanic and Atmospheric Administration
