= City of Elizabeth =

- Local government area
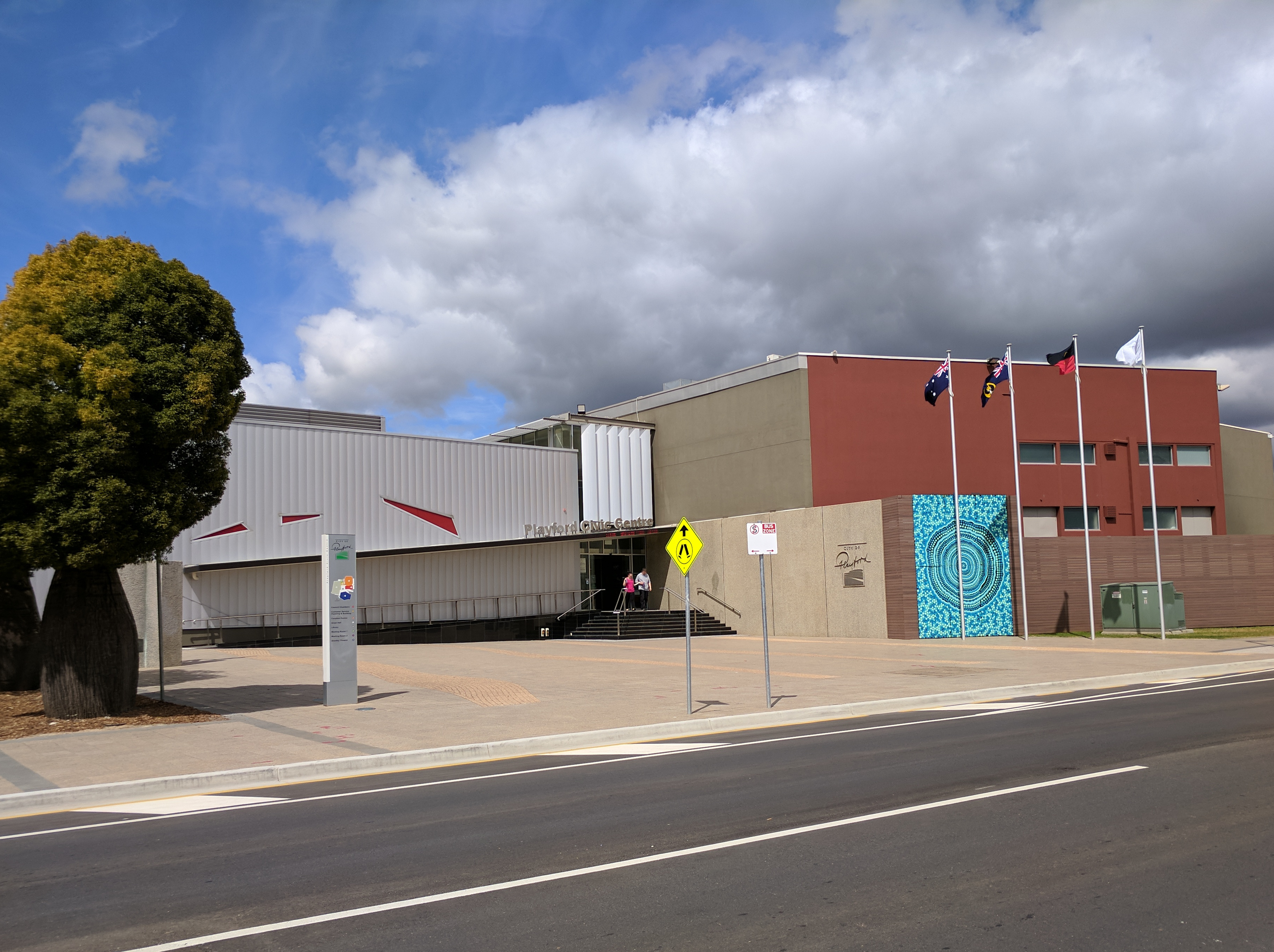
- City of Playford civic centre in 2017, formerly the City of Elizabeth council seat

- Coordinates: 34°42′54″S 138°40′12″E
- Country: Australia
- State: South Australia
- Established: 1964
- Abolished: 1997
- Council seat: Elizabeth
LGAs around City of Elizabeth
| Munno Para | Munno Para | Munno Para |
| Salisbury | City of Elizabeth | Munno Para |
| Salisbury | Salisbury | Tea Tree Gully |

The City of Elizabeth was a local government area located in the northern suburbs of Adelaide and seated at Elizabeth from 1964 to 1997. In 1997, it was merged with the City of Munno Para to create the City of Playford, which governs the area today.

== History ==
=== Prehistory ===
Prior to the 1950s, most of the area surrounding today's suburb of Elizabeth was farming estates. After the end of the Second World War and the accompanying shortage of materials, the state government decided that South Australia needed to grow and become an industrialised state.

A satellite city was planned for northern metropolitan fringe of Adelaide, and the South Australian Housing Trust initiated a housing development program in the area, with a purchase of 3,000 acres (1,200 ha) of rural land between the established townships of Salisbury and Smithfield. In 1950 during the early planning stages the name Munno Para headed a list of names recommended by the Premier to the State's Nomenclature Committee name for the new satellite town. The first survey and works started in July 1954. Initially it was proposed that the Civic Administration of the New Town would be shared between the Salisbury and Munno Para 'East' District Councils.

=== Settlement and incorporation ===
Elizabeth, the suburb, was established within the District Council of Salisbury on 16 November 1955, being named after Queen Elizabeth II, who visited the city in 1963. More than seven years later, the Salisbury council was renamed to be the District Council of Salisbury and Elizabeth on 22 August 1963, in recognition of the burgeoning community on its northern lands. A year later, on 1 July 1964, the municipality of the Town of Elizabeth was created by severance from the District Council of Salisbury and Elizabeth, and the latter reverted to the name Salisbury.

The new municipality encompassed most or all of the suburbs of Elizabeth North, to the north, Elizabeth Park, to the north east, Elizabeth East, to the east, Elizabeth Grove and Elizabeth Vale, to the south east, Elizabeth South, to the south and south west, and Elizabeth West (now most of Edinburgh North and the southern half of Davoren Park), to the north west.

=== Merger ===
The City of Elizabeth was amalgamated with the City of Munno Para in 1997 to form the City of Playford. Twenty years hence, the term 'Elizabeth', in the context of Adelaide, still typically referred to the pre-amalgamation municipality encompassing both the suburb of Elizabeth and those suburbs surrounding it, and the distinct community they comprised.

== Localities ==
A total of nine suburban localities clustered around the Elizabeth town centre were named for the City of Elizabeth, by which they were locally governed at some point:

- Elizabeth South
- Elizabeth North
- Elizabeth East
- Elizabeth West (abolished in 2011 and split between Edinburgh North and Davoren Park)
- Elizabeth Downs
- Elizabeth Field (abolished in 1993; now Davoren Park)
- Elizabeth Grove
- Elizabeth Park
- Elizabeth Vale

== Community ==
The early town centre, now Elizabeth City Centre, had open air shopping malls and a theatre called the Octagon. Residential suburbs of Elizabeth were established with the earliest being Elizabeth South and Elizabeth North. Each was configured as a local community around a small shopping centre containing a supermarket, bank, hotel and service station along with other shops. Automotive manufacturer Holden established a manufacturing plant in the area, becoming a major employer along with the Department of Defence with its Long Range Weapons Establishment, later the Defence Science and Technology Organisation, and RAAF Base Edinburgh. Migrants were encouraged to settle in Elizabeth and its suburbs.

Elizabeth had large areas of open space, with the most prominent being Fremont Park, on Main North Road. Elizabeth was the sister city of Fremont, California; Lake Elizabeth in Fremont Central Park is named for the city.

Elizabeth also had a strong music scene, providing a home for Jimmy Barnes, John Swan, Bernard "Doc" Neeson and Glenn Shorrock, among other musicians.

== Mayors of Elizabeth ==
- Eugene Francis O'Sullivan (1964–1965)
- Stewart Lynn Gilchrist (1965–1968)
- Lloyd Maxwell Duffield (1968–1972)
- Joyce Eastland (1972–1977)
- Terry Hemmings (1977–1979)
- Eve Edge (1979–1980)
- Donald Paginton (1980–1981)
- Martyn Evans (1981–1984)
- Alfred (Alf) Thomas Charles (1989–1995)
- Marilyn Baker (1995-1997)

== Neighbouring local government ==
The following adjacent local government bodies co-existed with the Elizabeth council:

- District Council of Munno Para (established 1853 as Munno Para East) lay north west, north, north east and east. In 1988 the population passed the threshold for city status and it was then known as the City of Munno Para.
- District Council of Tea Tree Gully (established 1858) lay south east. In 1968 the population passed the threshold for city status and it was then known as the City of Tea Tree Gully.
- City of Salisbury (established 1933 by the merger of Yatala North and a large portion of Munno Para West) lay south, south west and west.
