= Hundred of Munno Para =

Munno Para
- Cadastral division
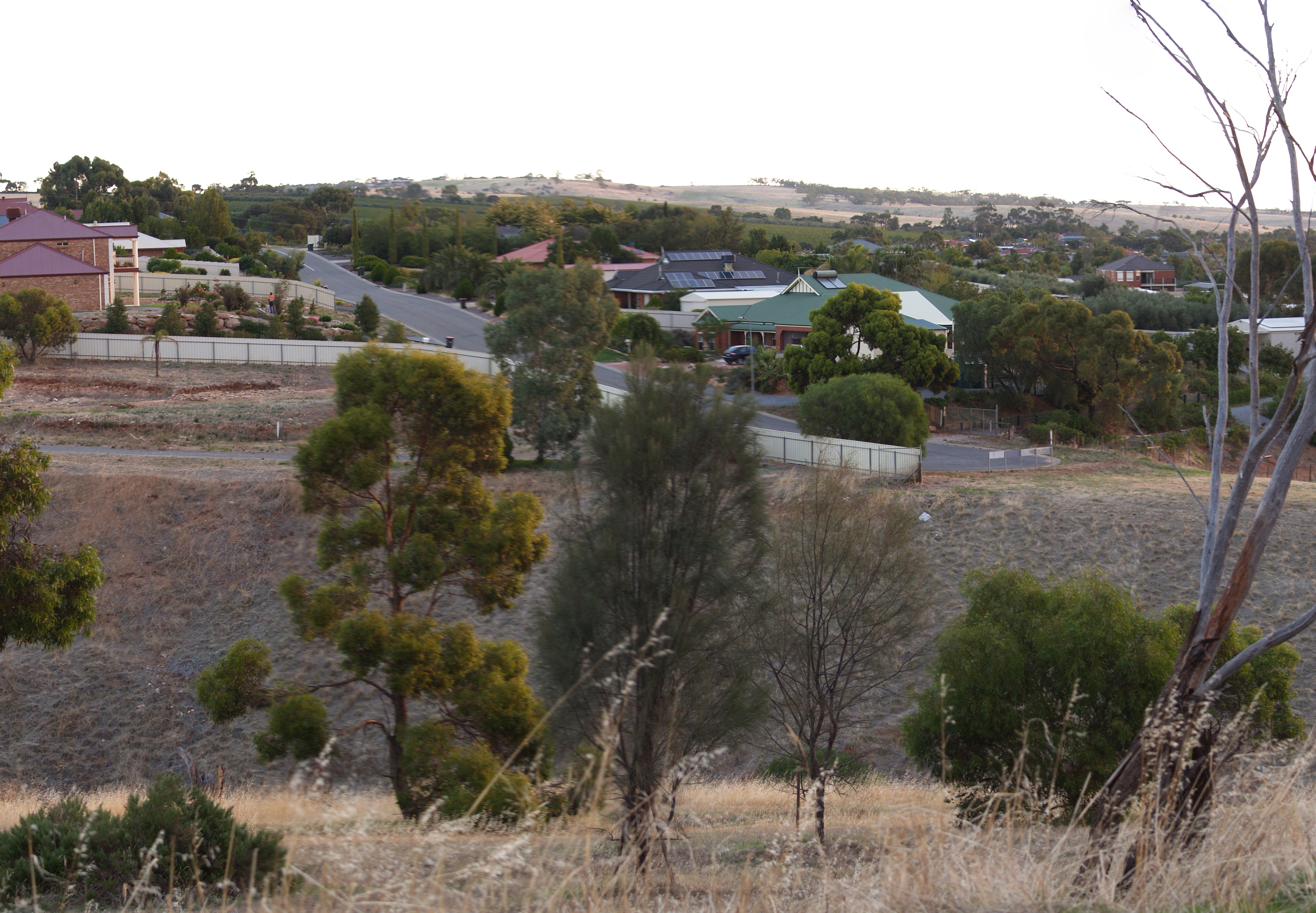
- View of Adelaide foothills, Craigmore

- Coordinates: 34.68°S 138.67°E
- Country: Australia
- State: South Australia
- Established: 29 October 1846
- County: Adelaide
Lands administrative divisions around Munno Para
Port Gawler	Mudla Wirra	Nuriootpa
Port Adelaide	Munno Para	Barossa
Port Adelaide	Yatala	Para Wirra

The Hundred of Munno Para (pronounced /ˈmʌnoʊ ˈpɑːrə/) is a cadastral unit of hundred covering the outer northern suburbs of Adelaide north of the Little Para River and the flanking semi-rural areas in South Australia. It is one of the eleven hundreds of the County of Adelaide. It was named in 1846 by Governor Frederick Robe, Munno Para being a term from a local Kaurna Aboriginal people meaning golden wattle creek. This name refers to either the Gawler River (which starts at the confluence of the South Para River and North Para River) or the Little Para River.

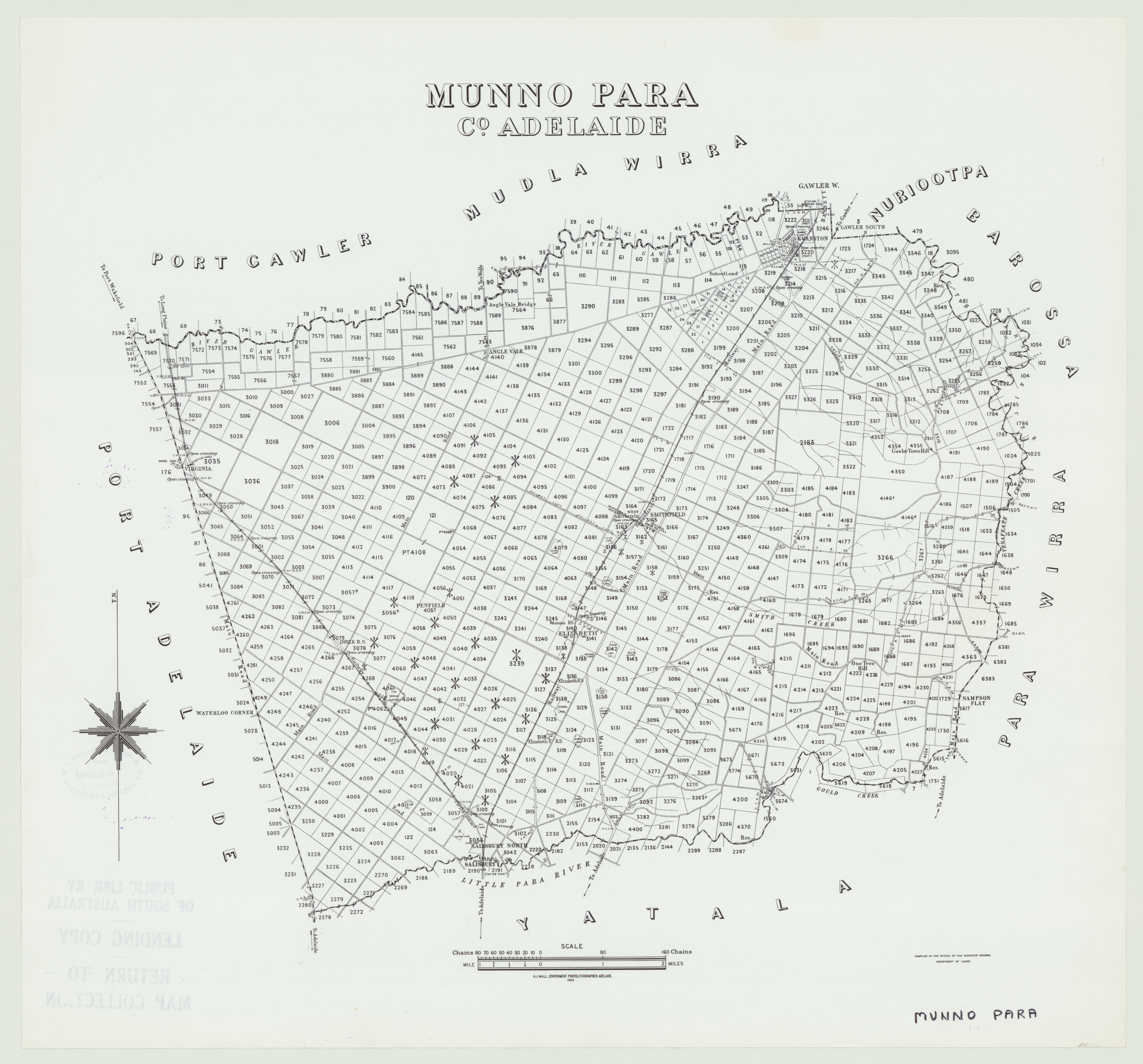
Cadastral map from 1964

== History ==
The District Council of Munno Para East and District Council of Munno Para West were established in 1853 and 1854, respectively, bringing local government to the whole hundred. In 1899 a part of the council of Munno Para West was severed to be the District Council of Gawler South and later merged with the Corporate Town of Gawler in 1933. The remainder of the council of Munno Para West was abolished in the same year, with part going to the Gawler municipality, part to the new District Council of Salisbury and the remainder merging with Munno Para East council to form the new District Council of Munno Para, extending across the entire hundred from west to east with the exception of Salisbury encroaching in the southwest corner and Gawler occupying the north eastern corner. The Munno Para council was based at Smithfield in the centre of the hundred and directly beside the main road north.

In the post-war boom the township of Elizabeth was established within the hundred between the existing Smithfield and Salisbury townships to house workers for the new Holden automotive manufacturing plant. Initially part of Salisbury council area, it became a municipal council in its own right called the Town of Elizabeth in 1964, by severance from Salisbury. Salisbury attained city status just months later in the same year. Munno Para council was accorded city status in 1988 and the two cities of Munno Para and Elizabeth ultimately merged to form the City of Playford northerly adjacent to Salisbury in 1997.

The local government areas whose boundaries cross into the hundred, as of 2017, are thus the City of Playford across most of the hundred, the City of Salisbury occupying the south west corner including the RAAF Edinburgh and accompanying Department of Defence precinct, and the Town of Gawler occupying the north east corner surrounding the Gawler township at the confluence of North Para and South Para rivers.

== See also ==
- City of Playford
- City of Salisbury
- Town of Gawler
- City of Munno Para
- District Council of Munno Para East
- District Council of Munno Para West
  - Munno Para, South Australia
  - Munno Para Downs, South Australia
  - Munno Para West, South Australia
- Lands administrative divisions of South Australia
