= Munno Para, South Australia =

Munno Para
- Suburb
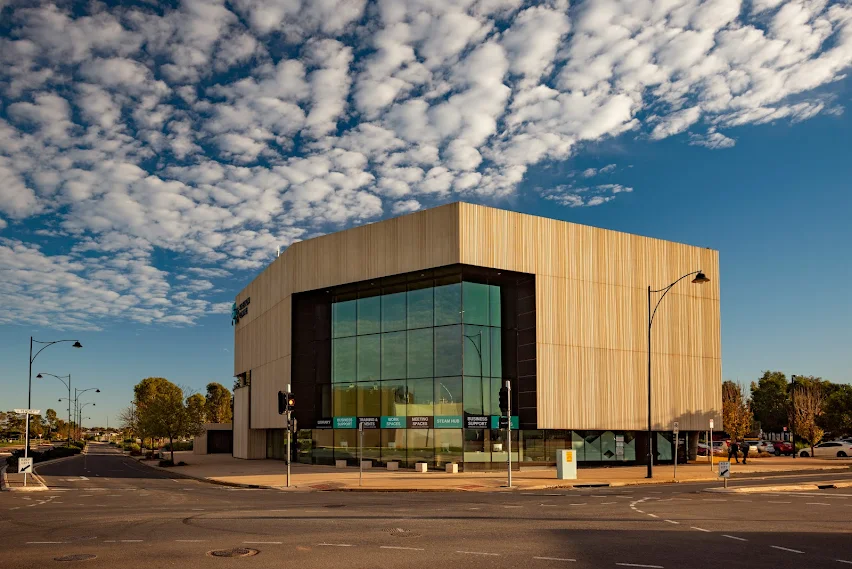
- Stretton Centre, Munno Para

- Coordinates: 34°40′00″S 138°42′00″E
- Country: Australia
- State: South Australia
- City: Adelaide
- LGA: City of Playford
- Location: 32 km (20 mi) north of Adelaide city centre
- Established: 1978

Government
  - State electorate: Light 2018
  - Federal division: Spence

Population
  - Total: 4,997
- Postcode: 5115
Suburbs around Munno Para
Munno Para Downs	Kudla	Evanston South
Munno Para West	Munno Para	Blakeview
Smithfield Plains	Smithfield	Blakeview

Munno Para (pronounced /ˈmʌnoʊ ˈpɑːrə/) is a northern suburb of Adelaide, South Australia. It is located in the City of Playford.

In the local Kaurna dialect, Munno Para means golden wattle creek. The name refers to either the Gawler River (which starts at the confluence of the South Para River and North Para River) or the Little Para River from which the much larger cadastral Hundred of Munno Para derives its name.

== History ==
Until 1997, Munno Para was part of the City of Munno Para, formerly the district councils of Munno Para East and Munno Para West, which were established in 1853 and 1854 on land bounded by the cadastral Hundred of Munno Para. The older part of the suburb began from a subdivision in 1955, and the suburb was formally named in 1978. Until the locality was urbanised from 1955, Munno Para formed part of the farming district north of Smithfield. The Andrews family farmed much of the land west of the Gawler Central railway line and along what is now Stebonheath Road.

During the late 20th century, growth was concentrated east of the railway corridor, supported by residential subdivision and improved transport access. Munno Para railway station opened in 1978 to serve the developing area and was rebuilt between 2011 and 2012 with longer platforms and upgraded access as part of the Gawler line modernisation.

From the early 2000s, the Playford Alive urban renewal program drove large-scale development west of the railway line. Initial stages focused around Coventry Road before expanding into the "Playford Town Centre" precinct with new retail, civic and transport facilities along a redeveloped Curtis Road and an extended Peachey Road. A key civic anchor, the Stretton Centre, opened in 2015 as a business, learning and community hub named after social reformer Hugh Stretton.

Population growth accelerated with the rollout of Playford Alive estates and supporting infrastructure. The suburb's population grew from 1,754 (2006) to 1,694 (2011) and then to 4,719 (2021), reflecting westward expansion and new housing development. Ongoing planning for the Playford North Extension Growth Area aims to accommodate further residential and employment expansion within the suburb and its surrounds.

In 2025, the State and Commonwealth Governments announced joint funding to remove the Curtis Road level crossing on the Gawler line and upgrade the surrounding corridor to improve safety and travel times for Munno Para and nearby suburbs.

== Geography ==
The suburb lies northeast of Elizabeth and Smithfield. The original part of Munno Para is basically rectangular in shape, lying lengthwise between the Gawler railway line and Main North Road. More recent development on the western side of the railway line is also in the suburb of Munno Para. The entire suburb is fairly flat, sloping slightly down to the west and south.

The only road across the railway line in Munno Para is Curtis Road along the southern boundary of the suburb. Pedestrians can also cross at the Munno Para railway station. Main North Road runs along the eastern boundary, Stebonheath Road along the western boundary. Coventry Road historically was parallel and halfway between these two, however the suburban development has introduced some bends for traffic calming on this route.

== Demographics ==
The 2021 Census by the Australian Bureau of Statistics counted 4,719 persons in Munno Para on census night. Of these, 49.5% were male and 50.5% were female.

The majority of residents (76.6%) are of Australian birth, with other common census responses being England (4.8%) India (1.4%) Philippines (1.3%).

The average age of Munno Para residents is lower than the greater Australian population. 61.5% of residents were over 25 years in 2021, compared to the Australian average of 69.8%; and 38.5% were younger than 25 years, compared to the Australian average of 30.2%.

== Community and business ==
The local newspaper is the News Review Messenger. Other regional and national newspapers such as The Advertiser and The Australian are also available.

=== Schools ===
Munno Para Primary School is located near the centre of the original part of the suburb. Mark Oliphant College and Adelaide North Special School are in the northern part of the newer area.

=== Stretton Centre ===
The Stretton Centre is a business, learning, and research hub with an on-site library situated in the Playford Alive Town Park. It includes a library, support for businesses, modern spaces for training and workshops, office spaces for small to medium-sized businesses, and STEAM (Science, Technology, Engineering, Art, and Mathematics) learning programs.

== Attractions ==
=== Parks ===
There is greenspace throughout the residential areas of the suburb. The older part is designed with a linear park through the middle of the long axis. The newer part has landscaped wetlands along Curtis Road near Douglas Drive (formerly Coventry Road) and near Stebonheath Road. These wetlands calm and treat stormwater before releasing it into Smith Creek. The North Lakes golf course is in the northwestern corner.

== Transportation ==
=== Roads ===
Munno Para is serviced by Main North Road, linking the suburb to Gawler, Elizabeth and Salisbury.

=== Public transport ===
Munno Para is serviced by buses run by the Adelaide Metro. The suburb also lies astride the Gawler railway line, being serviced at Munno Para railway station.

=== Bicycle routes ===
A bicycle path extends through parklands through the middle of the original part of the suburb.

== See also ==
- List of Adelaide suburbs
- Hundred of Munno Para
