= City of Munno Para =

- Local government area
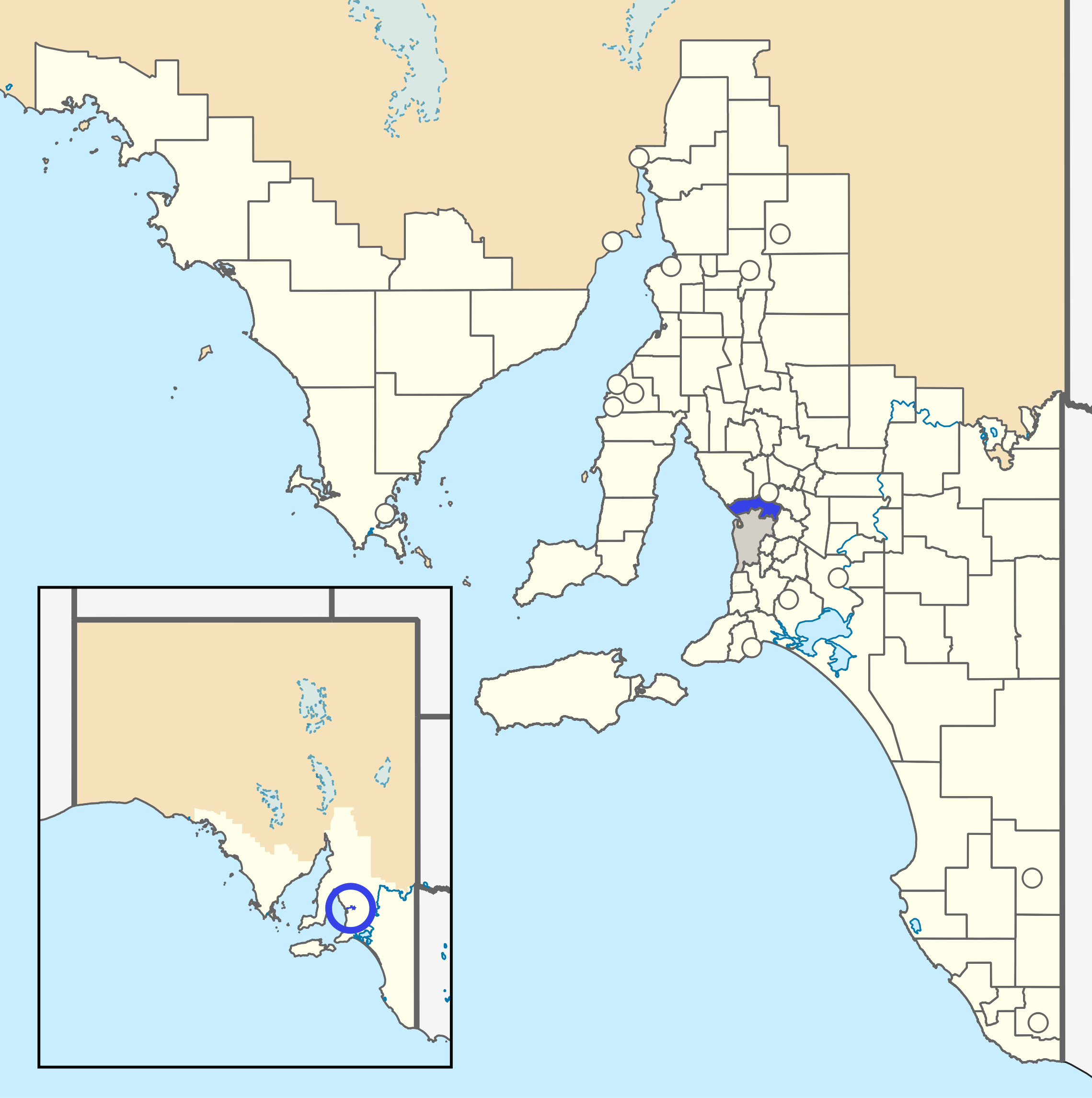
- The District Council of Munno Para as it was in 1970 (blue)
- Coordinates: 34.685833°S 138.686944°E
- Country: Australia
- State: South Australia
- Established: 6 November 1958
- Abolished: 1997
- Council seat: Smithfield
LGAs around City of Munno Para
Port Gawler (1933–1935); Mallala (1935–1997)	Gawler (1933–1997)	Mudla Wirra (1933–1977); Light (1977–1996)
Salisbury (1933–1997)	City of Munno Para	Para Wirra (1933–1935); Barossa (1933–1996)
Highercombe (1933–1935); Salisbury (1933–1997)	Elizabeth (1964–1997)	Para Wirra (1933–1935); Tea Tree Gully(1933–1997)

The City of Munno Para (pronounced /ˈmʌnoʊ ˈpɑːrə/), formerly the District Council of Munno Para, was a local government area of South Australia from 6 November 1958 to 1997, seated at the township of Smithfield. In 1997 the City of Munno Para merged with the City of Elizabeth to form the new City of Playford.

== Early years ==
District Council of Munno Para East was proclaimed on 10 November 1853 and expanded on 22 June 1933 by the amalgamation of the existing District Council of Munno Para East with a severed central portion of the District Council of Munno Para West.The first meeting of the expanded District Council was held at Uley on Monday 3 July 1933. On 6 November 1958 eventually 'East' was dropped from the name following some further boundary changes in the west with the District Council of Salisbury in 1954. The District Council bounded approximated an area known as the northern Para Plains, so called due to the proximity of the North Para, South Para and Little Para rivers.

== Council Chambers and Office ==
The District Council of Munno Para East used the old Chapel on Uley Road at Uleybury as it Council Chamber. During the 1950s the Council Office was at 34 Murray Street Gawler until it moved to new building adjacent the Shopping Centre on Crittenden Road, Smithfield Plains.

Prior to the 1950s, most of the area surrounding the township of Smithfield was farming estates. In the post-war boom the Adelaide satellite city of Elizabeth was established about 4 kilometres (2.5 mi) south of the Smithfield Township (subdivided by John Smith in 1853), boosting the population and urbanising the latter.

On 13 December 1984, The District Council of Munno Para passed the population threshold for City status and was renamed to City of Munno Para.. The Council Offices relocated from Smithfield Plains into a new Building and adjacent Library located on Warooka Drive, Smithfield next to Smith's Creek.

== Mayors City of Munno Para ==
After being granted City status, the Chairperson role for the District Council became an Elected Mayor role.

John Joseph McVeity became the first Mayor of the City of Munno Para on 13 December 1984.

Jospehine (Jo) Gapper OAM became The City of Munno Para’s first elected Mayor in 1985. She served in successive terms until her retirement in 1995.

Martin Lindsell was elected Mayor in 1995 and served until the City of Munno Para merged with the City of Playford in 1997.

== See also ==
- District Council of Munno Para East
- District Council of Munno Para West
- Hundred of Munno Para
- Munno Para, South Australia
- Munno Para railway station
- Munno Para Downs, South Australia
- Munno Para West, South Australia
