= Hillbank, South Australia =

Hillbank
- Suburb
- Coordinates: 34.7°S 138.7°E
- Country: Australia
- State: South Australia
- City: Adelaide
- LGA: City of Playford

Government
  - State electorate: King
  - Federal division: Spence

Population
  - Total: 5,013 (SAL 2021)
- Postcode: 5112
Suburbs around Hillbank
Elizabeth Park	Craigmore	One Tree Hill
Elizabeth East, Elizabeth Grove, Elizabeth Vale	Hillbank	Gould Creek
Salisbury Park	Salisbury Heights

Hillbank is a residential suburb of the City of Playford in the northern suburbs of Adelaide, South Australia. Hillbank was officially known as Elizabeth Heights until 23 December 1987 when it was renamed by the Geographical Names Advisory Committee. At the time Hillbank came under the Munno Para District Council.

== Early history ==
Little Para Wesleyan Church and cemetery was established on Williams Road. The chapel was built and opened for worship in April, 1857 and served the needs of the small settlement on the Little Para around the Old Spot hotel. The small cemetery was situated on section 3092 and originally belonged to the Wesleyan Methodists from the Gawler circuit and the last burial was in 1899. The chapel was built on land originally owned by Thomas Williams. The church was demolished in 1902.

== Sub Divisions ==
The original subdivision was laid out under the name of Hill Bank. Even though the area had been officially known as Elizabeth Heights it had also been unofficially known as Hillbank from the 1960s. In 1961 there were two privately owned sections of land one being descriptively known as ‘Hill’ and other ‘Bank’. In 1966 the whole area became known as ‘Hillbank’ when the descriptive names were joined.

In 1976, the South Australian Lands Commission and Beneficial Finance Co. Ltd. commenced the subdivision of the Hillbank Estate on Part Sections 2021, 3273, 3274, 3275, 3139, 3092, 4400 in the Hundred of Munno Para.

Further land including the former suburb of Elizabeth Heights was added to Hillbank in 1987.

Hillbank was also home to the local Elizabeth Star Line originally named Shandon Drive in "Drive In" theatre located off Shandon Drive which opened on 16 May 1958 and closed on 8 February 1989 and was later pulled down and subdivided into Birchdale Estate.

== Jo Gapper Park ==
Jo Gapper Park is a recreation reserve in Hillbank, on the face of the Adelaide Hills with views across the plains. It has a lookout with views across Munno Para, Elizabeth, Outer Harbor, Port Adelaide and Parafield Airport.

== Demographics ==
The 2021 Census by the Australian Bureau of Statistics counted 5,013 persons in the suburb of Hillbank on census night up from 4,610 persons on census night 2016. Of these, 2,510 (50.1%) were male up from 2,315 (50.2%) on census night 2016 and 2,500 (49.9%) were female up from census night 2016 when 2,300 (49.8%) were female. The majority of residents 3,686 (73.5%) up from 3,303 (72.0%) in the 2016 census was born in Australia. 460 (9.2%) down from 2016 census where 545 (11.9%) were born in England. The median age of Hillbank residents is 36 down from 38 on census night 2016.
