= Elizabeth East =

- Suburb
- Coordinates: 34°43′34″S 138°40′52″E
- Country: Australia
- State: South Australia
- City: Adelaide
- LGA: City of Playford

Government
  - State electorate: Elizabeth
  - Federal division: Spence

Population
  - Total: 4,607 (SAL 2021)
- Postcode: 5112
Suburbs around Elizabeth East
	Elizabeth Park
Elizabeth	Elizabeth East	Hillbank
Elizabeth Grove	Elizabeth Vale

Elizabeth East is a northern suburb of Adelaide, South Australia in the City of Playford.

== Demographics ==
The 2016 census by the Australian Bureau of Statistics counted 4,400 people in the suburb of Elizabeth East on census night. Of these, 2,196 (49.5%) were male and 2,239 (50.5%) were female.

The majority of residents 2,791 (63.1%) were Australian born, with 452 (10.2%) born in England.

The age distribution of Elizabeth East residents is similar to that of the greater Australian population. 67.9% of residents were aged 25 or over in 2016, compared to the Australian average of 68.8%; and 32.3% were younger than 25 years, compared to the Australian average of 31.5%.

== Facilities ==
The Catholic Church in Elizabeth East is dedicated to St Ann.

== See also ==
- Elizabeth North
- Elizabeth South
