= Elizabeth West, South Australia =

Elizabeth West Adelaide, South Australia
- Coordinates: 34.70519°S 138.6612°E
- Established: 1955
- Abolished: 2011
- Postcode(s): 5113
- LGA(s): City of Playford

Elizabeth West was a northern suburb of Adelaide, South Australia located within the City of Playford. It was established in 1955 as a satellite suburb to the Elizabeth town centre. In 1993, the northern part of Elizabeth West was merged with Elizabeth Field to form the new suburb of Davoren Park. On 27 October 2011, the remaining portion of Elizabeth West, along with some land from Penfield to its west, was combined to create the new suburb of Edinburgh North.

The northern part of Elizabeth West, located north of Womma Road, was primarily residential, while the southern area, now part of Edinburgh North, was mainly industrial. The suburb had convenient access to transportation through the Womma and Broadmeadows stations, on the Gawler railway line.
