= Edinburgh North =

Edinburgh North may refer to:

- Edinburgh North, South Australia
- Edinburgh North (UK Parliament constituency)
- Edinburgh Northern (Scottish Parliament constituency)

It could also mean:

- Edinburgh North and Leith (Scottish Parliament constituency)
- Edinburgh North and Leith (UK Parliament constituency)
