= Craigmore, South Australia =

Craigmore
- Suburb
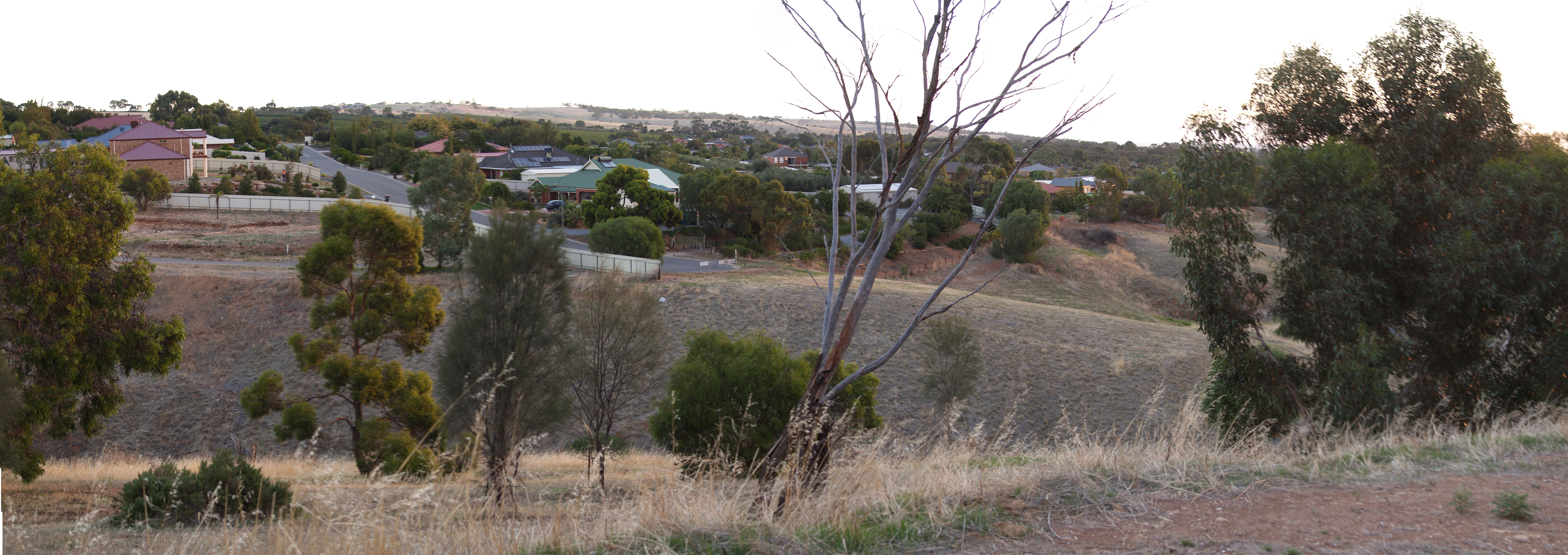
- Beatrix Drive, Craigmore, with Para Substation in the background

- Coordinates: 34°42′31″S 138°42′20″E
- Country: Australia
- State: South Australia
- City: Adelaide
- LGA: City of Playford
- Location: 5 km (3.1 mi) from Elizabeth; 29.3 km (18.2 mi) from Adelaide
- Established: 1978

Government
  - State electorates: Elizabeth (2022); King (2026)
  - Federal division: Spence

Population
  - Total: 10,943 (SAL 2021)
- Postcode: 5114
Suburbs around Craigmore
Blakeview	Blakeview	Uleybury
Elizabeth Downs	Craigmore	One Tree Hill
Elizabeth Park	Hillbank	Gould Creek

Craigmore is a residential suburb north of Adelaide, South Australia. It is in the City of Playford local government area, east of Elizabeth, Elizabeth Park, Blakeview and north east of Hillbank and west of One Tree Hill, South Australia.

== History ==
Craigmore is within the traditional territory of the Aboriginal Kaurna people of the Adelaide Plains. European settlement in the area began in the early 1850s and the wider district was known as Smithfield based upon the Township established by John Smith. Blair Farm was established by Gavin Scoular on land north of what is now Uley Road and East of Adams Road. Through a series of land purchases from 1853 to 1867 Scoular had built up his land holding to a total of 577 acres. Thomas Hogarth who was a member of South Australian Legislative Council from 1866 until his retirement in 1885 established a property in 1850 called Blair Place on land south of and adjacent to Smith's Creek and east of what is now known as Adams Road. Many of the early settlers of the Smithfield District had emigrated from Scotland. The meaning in Scottish for "Craig" is "rocky hill" and "More" is "big".

The modern development of Craigmore started circa 1970s with the construction of State Housing Trust estates. During 1975, the southeastern part of what is now Craigmore was built as a private development named Blair Park. Further private developments occurred during the mid-1980s, late 1990s, and throughout 2000, with urban infill still incomplete. This development has made Craigmore one of Adelaide's longest suburbs by distance, totalling 3.75 kilometres parallel with Adams Road between Kakuna Crescent and Arthur Street.

== Geography ==
Craigmore is situated on foothills approximately 29 km by road from the Adelaide GPO. Although Craigmore is a suburb of Adelaide and part of the Adelaide metropolitan area, Craigmore is 11 km from Gawler by road. Most dwellings are built up to the start of the hills (One Tree Hill), which are used for cattle grazing and wine growing.

Smith Creek within Craigmore Park runs through the middle of Craigmore, with an elevation of the suburb ranging from 86 to 149 meters at its highest point.

== Demographics ==
At the 2021 census, Craigmore had a population of 10,943. Residents of Craigmore have a mixed income, with older former public housing residents in the middle and larger, more expensive houses in the newer estates such as Somerset Grove and Beckham Rise.

== Community ==
Following the 2024 South Australia Electoral District redistribution Craigmore has been split between two state electorates - Elizabeth and King. All of the area south of Uley Road and east of Adams Road has been moved from Elizabeth into the Electorate of King. The new boundaries will take effect at the next state election on 21 March 2026.

== Facilities ==
Craigmore is serviced by Craigmore High School which opened in 1970 originally as Smithfield High.

Craigmore is also serviced by a shopping centre containing a supermarket and many other specialty shops. There is a YMCA, a number of public primary schools, Catherine McCauley School, and an R-12 Christian College (Hope Christian College). Close by, the large Munno Para Shopping City has many large stores. Some sporting clubs that reside in the area are Craigmore Cricket Club and the Munno Para City Soccer Club.

In June 2010, Craigmore was finally given television reception through the erection of a tower on the corner of Uley and Adams Roads in Elizabeth Downs. In the same month, Craigmore was also given ADSL equivalent speed internet through wireless WiMAX. Prior to this date, one-half of the dwellings in Craigmore were within an ADSL blackspot and were required to rely on 3G, dialup, or satellite internet.

=== Parks ===
Craigmore Park runs through the centre of the suburb. The Smith Creek Trail linear park, known as the Elephant Walk in some sections, has a shared footpath/bikeway and can be followed to the Civic Gardens on Anderson Walk in Smithfield and Stebonheath Park at Andrews Farm. As Craigmore borders the Adelaide Hills, there are lookout points on Craigmore Road and Uley Road, where the Yorke Peninsula can sometimes be seen on a clear day.

=== Schools ===
- Catherine McCauley Primary School
- Craigmore South Primary School
- Craigmore High School
- Hope Christian College
- Playford Primary School

=== Churches ===
- Craigmore Christian Church
- Craigmore Latter Day Saints Chapel

== Transport ==
The area of Craigmore is serviced by Adelaide Metro which provides the 441, 442 and 443 services. All three services terminate at the Smithfield and Elizabeth Interchanges, with train connections to Adelaide and Gawler. The 443 service covers most of the area serviced by the 440, 441 and 442 bus services which only run as night services.

== Notable people ==
- Hon. Thomas Hogarth MP, (1815–1893) pioneering farmer - Blair Place near Smithfield (now Craigmore). Member of South Australian Legislative Council from 1866 until his retirement in 1885.
- David Hicks; former Guantánamo Bay detainee.
- Travis Head an Australian cricketer

== See also ==
- City of Playford
- List of Adelaide suburbs
