= Elizabeth Grove =

- Suburb
- Coordinates: 34°44′06″S 138°40′09″E
- Country: Australia
- State: South Australia
- City: Adelaide
- LGA: City of Playford
- Established: 1955

Government
  - State electorate: Elizabeth
  - Federal division: Spence

Population
  - Total: 2,531 (SAL 2021)
- Postcode: 5112
Suburbs around Elizabeth Grove
	Elizabeth	Elizabeth East
Elizabeth South	Elizabeth Grove
	Elizabeth Vale	Hillbank

Elizabeth Grove is a suburb in the northern extent of Adelaide, South Australia, on the western side of Main North Road south of Elizabeth. It is bounded by Main North Road, Hogarth Road, Harvey Road and Ridley Road. It contains a local shopping centre, public and Catholic primary schools, and churches of several denominations.

== History ==
Elizabeth Grove was established in 1955 as one of the southern suburbs of what was then the new satellite city of Elizabeth. It was originally a private subdivision of Sections 3112–3114, 3119, 3124, 3123 and 3120 of the Hundred of Munno Para, which includes the current suburb plus some of Elizabeth South and Elizabeth Vale.

The Elizabeth Grove Methodist Church (now Uniting Church) foundation stone was laid on 27 November 1956 by Premier Thomas Playford, less than two weeks after Elizabeth was inaugurated. The building provided a church but also a community hall used for many activities. It also had tennis courts, the first home courts of the Elizabeth Tennis Club. The building has a local heritage listing, and has been added to several times over the years.
