= Fremont Park =

Park in South Australia

- Location within City of Playford
- Type: landmark
- Location: Elizabeth Park, South Australia
- Coordinates: 34°43′03″S 138°40′33″E
- Operator: City of Playford
- Website: www.playford.sa.gov.au/page.aspx?u=1298

Fremont Park sits centrally in Elizabeth, Adelaide, South Australia, which is located within the City of Playford.

Elizabeth has large areas of open space, with the most prominent being Fremont Park, on Main North Road. It was originally known as Town Park.

The former City of Elizabeth was the sister city of Fremont, California, which Fremont Park was named after. The Fremont Park also includes a large lake with fountains and waterfalls.

== See also ==
- List of Adelaide parks and gardens
