= St Patrick's Technical College =

Location
- Adelaide, South Australia; Australia
- Coordinates: 34°42′39″S 138°39′51″E

Information
- School type: Australian technical college / technical college
- Motto: SACE – Training – Apprenticeships
- Established: January 2007 (as Australian Technical College – Northern Adelaide)
- Principal: Danny Deptula
- Grades: 10–12 SACE
- Enrolment: 264 (2024)
- Campus: Edinburgh North
- Colours: Blue and silver
- Website: www.stpatstech.sa.edu.au

St Patrick's Technical College is a technical college in the northern suburbs of South Australia's capital, Adelaide. Opened in 2007 by the Australian Government as part of the Australian Technical Colleges program, it now operates as part of Catholic Education South Australia.

St Patrick's offers a technical focused senior secondary education (Years 10, 11 and 12) and specialises in vocational education programs for students who wish to include a School-based Apprenticeship (SbA) as part of their South Australian Certificate of Education (SACE).

== History ==
=== Australian Technical College – Northern Adelaide (2007–2009) ===
ATC – Northern Adelaide logo and icon

The Australian Technical Colleges (ATCs) Program was established by the Australian Federal Government in 2005. The Government established 24 ATCs across Australia to provide both academic and vocational technical education. The Government's announcement stated that "each of the 24 chosen regions had a strong industry base with an identified skills need as well as a high youth population". The program ceased on 31 December 2009.

In 2005, the Australian Government selected a partnership between the Catholic Archdiocese of Adelaide and the Northern Adelaide Industry Group to establish and operate the Australian Technical College – Northern Adelaide.

Australian Technical College – Northern Adelaide commenced operations with 100 students in temporary facilities at Bishopstone Road, Davoren Park, in January 2007. In May 2008, operations moved to a $12 million purpose-built specialist facility, catering for up to 350 students, at Hooke Road, Edinburgh North.

=== St Patrick's Technical College (2009–present) ===
In July 2009, the College governance and ownership passed to the South Australian Commission for Catholic Schools on behalf of the Archdiocese of Adelaide and was subsequently renamed St Patrick's Technical College. In commenting on the transfer, Director of Catholic Education SA, Jane Swift commented, "We highly value the partnerships formed with industry and the local community and are committed to continuing the educational opportunities technical colleges provide for young people."

In August 2013, St Patrick's Technical College and TAFE SA signed a strategic partnership to deliver training as part of the South Australian Government Skills for All initiative.

2020 is a breaking year for the college with the celebration of 1000 apprenticeship commencements since the college opened in 2007. By the year's end, the college's triumphs crushed the existing sign-up record of 90 apprenticeships, securing school-based and full-time apprenticeships for students across various trade industries.

In 2021, the college expanded to offer Year 10. Opening its doors for the first time to Year 10 students eager to start their trade-focused secondary education and training options.

In August 2021, St Patrick’s Technical College signed VET Agreements with new training providers to deliver quality training and assessment of the college’s VET programs for 2022. Registered Training Organisations (RTOs) PEER, Motor Trade Association (MTA), Adelaide Institute of Hospitality, and Adelaide Training & Employment Centre (ATEC) joined TAFE SA to provide exciting opportunities for students.

== Programs ==
St Patrick’s Technical College is South Australia's only stand-alone Year 10 to 12 vocational education college. The college offers eight pre-apprenticeship trade programs, including Automotive, Construction, Electrotechnology, Food and Hospitality, Hair and Beauty, Information Technology, Metals and Engineering, and Plumbing.

== Curriculum ==
The St Patrick's Technical College SACE curriculum has been developed specifically to support the trades in which pre-vocational training is delivered. Core subjects (e.g. Mathematics, English, Science) are contextualised for each specific trade program with content input from industry in association with TAFE SA.

In addition, a minimum of six weeks of structured Work Experience is incorporated into the formal subject of Workplace Practices.

=== Advanced Technology Project ===
St Patrick’s Technical College is the Curriculum Focus School for the Advanced Technology Project, an initiative funded from the Australian Government by the Department of Defence and managed by the Department for Education and Child Development (DECD).

The Advanced Technology Project combines secondary school studies that have a specific focus on high level maths and science with highly technical Vocational Education and Training (VET). This combination provides a training pathway towards achieving a nationally recognised vocational accreditation and the SACE at the same time.

== Facilities ==
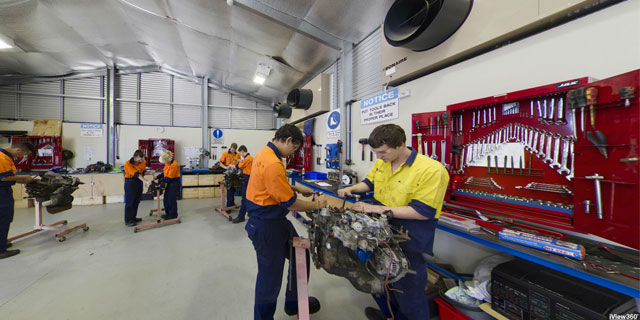
Automotive workshop

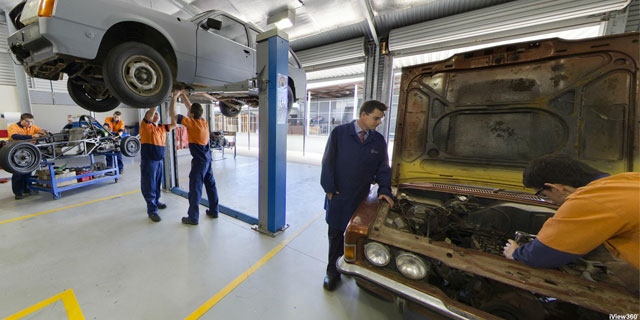
Automotive workshop

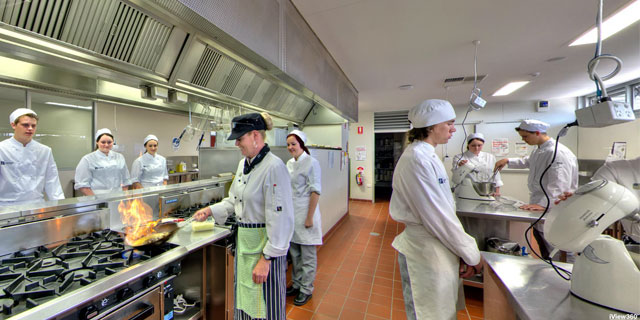
Commercial kitchen

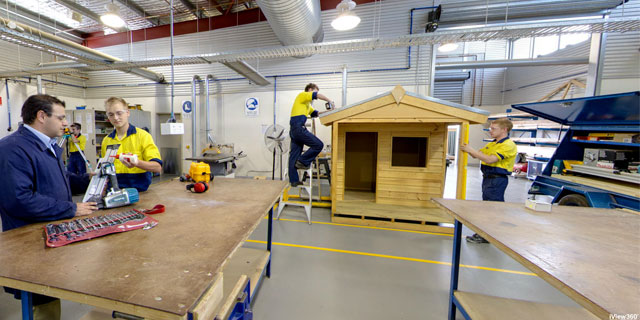
Construction workshop

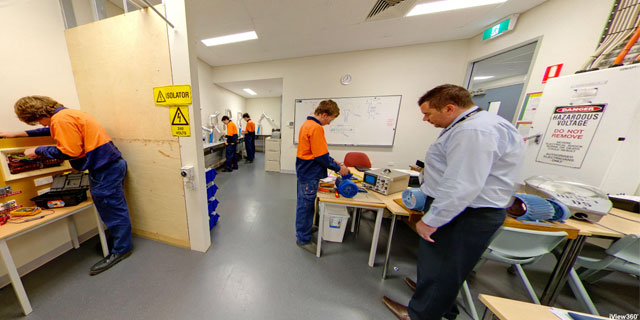
Electrical workshop

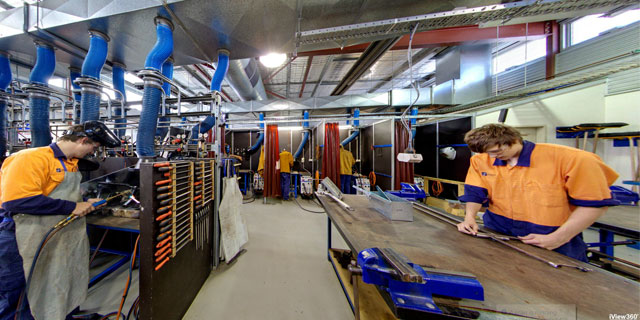
Engineering workshop

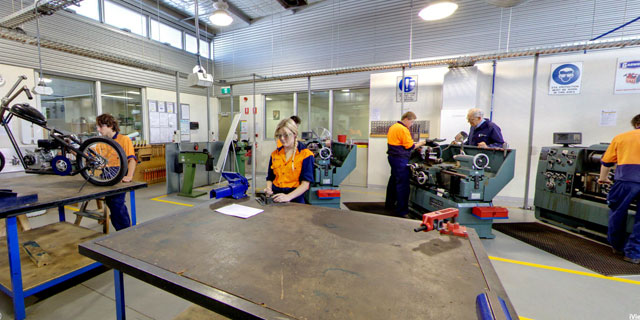
Engineering workshop

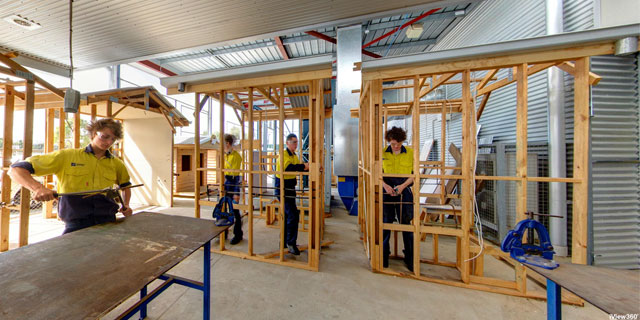
Plumbing workshop

== Awards ==
=== Institutional Awards ===
==== 2019 ====
- South Australian Training Awards – Finalist, VET Innovation for Schools Award

==== 2018 ====
- South Australian Training Awards – Finalist (with PMB Defence, Saab Australia, Century Engineering, TAFE SA and Defence Teaming Centre), Industry Collaboration Award - Northern Adelaide P-TECH Australia

==== 2014 ====
- National Growth Areas Alliance (NGAA) – Commendation, Skills Development - Developing Apprenticeship Skills in Northern Adelaide

==== 2013 ====
- South Australian Training Awards – Finalist (with DECD), Industry Collaboration Award – Applied Engineering program (Advanced Technologies Industry Pathways Program)

==== 2011 ====
- Schools First Local Impact Award – Habitat for Humanity program (Building & Construction)

==== 2010 ====
- South Australian Training Awards – Finalist, VET in Schools Excellence Award – Habitat for Humanity program (Building & Construction)
- South Australian Training Awards – Finalist (with Rostrevor College), VET in Schools Excellence Award, Indigenous program

== See also ==
- List of schools in South Australia
