= Para Wirra =

Para Wirra may refer to any of the following places in South Australia:

- Hundred of Para Wirra
  - District Council of Para Wirra
  - Para Wirra Conservation Park
