= Elizabeth South =

- Suburb
- Coordinates: 34.74126°S 138.65639°E
- Country: Australia
- State: South Australia
- City: Adelaide
- LGA: City of Playford
- Established: 1955

Government
  - State electorate: Elizabeth
  - Federal division: Spence

Population
  - Total: 2,933 (SAL 2021)
- Postcode: 5112
Suburbs around Elizabeth South
	Elizabeth	Elizabeth Grove
Edinburgh	Elizabeth South
Salisbury North	Salisbury	Elizabeth Vale

Elizabeth South is a northern suburb of Adelaide, South Australia in the City of Playford.

It was established in 1955 as one of the earliest residential suburbs of the planned City of Elizabeth. Like its neighbours, including Elizabeth and Elizabeth North, it was configured as a local community around a small shopping centre containing a supermarket, bank, hotel and service station along with other shops.

The western boundary is the Gawler railway line, with predominantly current and former Defence land on the other side, including the South Australian branch of the Defence Science and Technology Group opposite Elizabeth South railway station. The suburb is situated on both sides of Philip Highway. The northern part of the suburb (north of Hogarth Road) is a residential suburb, with corresponding schools, shops and other community services. South of Hogarth Road, the suburb is industrial, including automotive and defence manufacturing, dominated by the large Holden factory, which opened in 1960 and closed in 2017.

The water tower near the railway line is 44.2 metres (145 ft) tall and the tank holds 250,000 imperial gallons (1,100,000 L; 300,000 US gal). It was built around 1940 (before Elizabeth was established) to supply the munitions factory (now repurposed as Defence Science and Technology).

== Population ==
According to the 2021 census of population, there were 2,933 people in Elizabeth South.

- Aboriginal and Torres Strait Islander people made up 7.1% of the population.
- 84.4% of people were born in Australia. The next most common country of birth was England at 5%.
- 69.3% of people spoke only English at home.
- The most common response for religion was No Religion at 44.4%.

== Facilities ==
Elizabeth South is home to a Syro-Malabar Catholic community whose church is dedicated to St. Euphrasia.
