= News Review Messenger =

Weekly newspaper in Adelaide, Australia

- Type: Weekly suburban newspaper
- Format: Tabloid
- Owner: News Limited
- Editor-in-chief: Matt Deighton
- News editor: Chris Day
- Staff writers: John Stokes & Rob Greenwood
- Founded: 3 July 1968
- Headquarters: 23 Wiltshire Street, Salisbury, SA, Australia
- Sister newspapers: Messenger Newspapers
- Website: www.nrmessenger.com.au

News Review Messenger is a weekly suburban newspaper in Adelaide, South Australia, part of the Messenger Newspapers group. The paper's area stretches from Pooraka in the south, through to Gawler in the north, and covers Adelaide's northern suburbs.

The newspaper generally reports on events of interest in its distribution area, including the suburbs of Elizabeth, Salisbury, Gawler and Pooraka. It also covers the City of Playford, City of Salisbury and Town of Gawler councils.

It has a circulation of 89,618 and a readership of 81,000.

== History ==
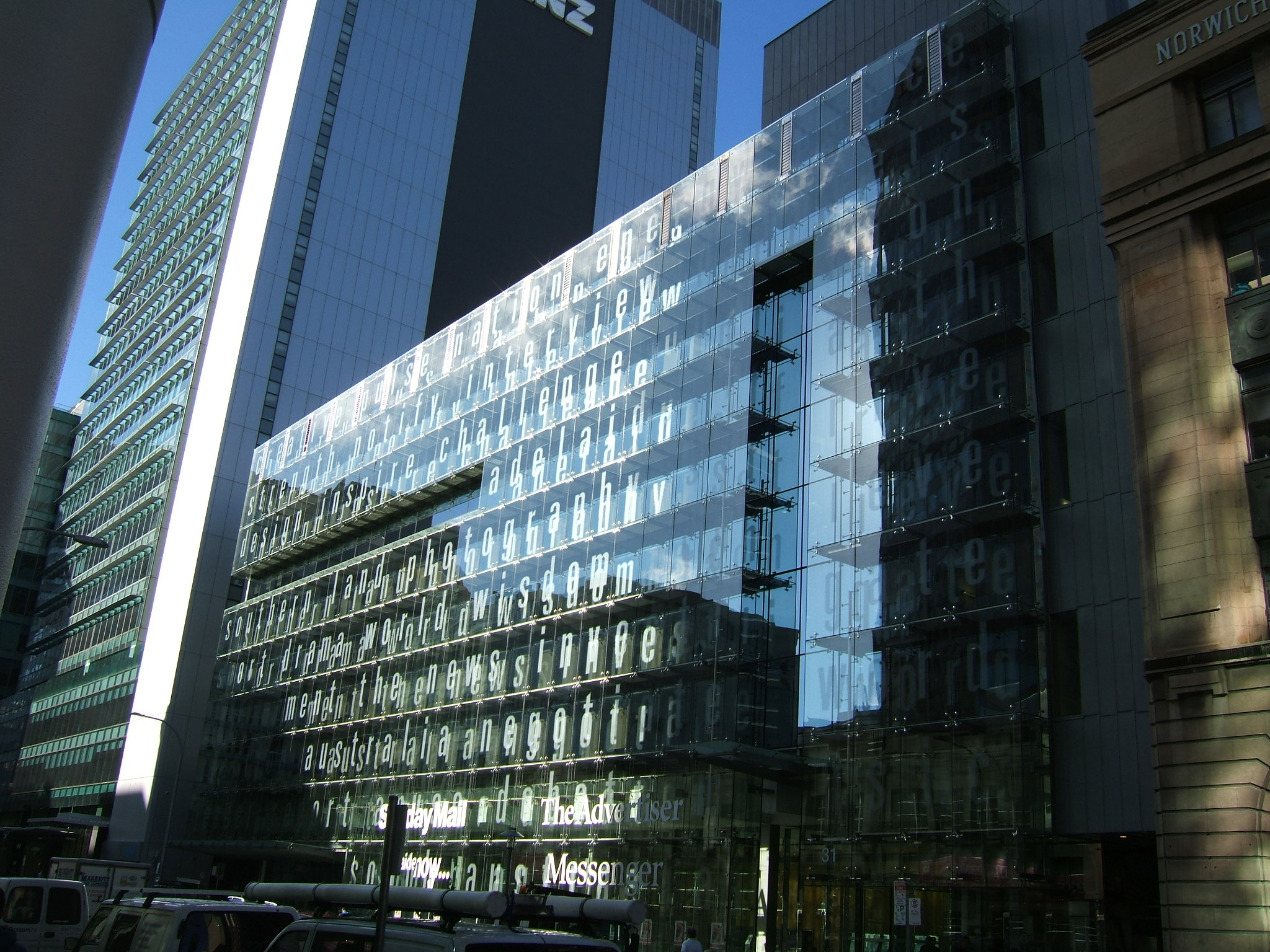
The office of the Messenger group of newspapers in Waymouth St, Adelaide

The Salisbury, Elizabeth and Gawler News-Review, as it was originally known, was first published on 3 July 1968. The creation of the paper reflected the growing population of Adelaide's northern suburbs in the 1960s. In 1977, the paper added Munno Para to its name to become the Salisbury, Elizabeth, Gawler and Munno Para News-Review, In addition to the Wednesday edition, a Friday edition, known as The Weekender, was established on 7 July 1978. The Weekender ceased production on 16 May 1980. From 6 June 1984 to 13 February 1985, the paper was known as the Salisbury, Elizabeth, Gawler Messenger. The News Review named was revived from 20 February 1985, with the paper renamed the News Review Messenger. In 2008, the paper was split in two, with dedicated Salisbury and Elizabeth/Gawler editions.
