= Electoral district of Elizabeth (South Australia) =

South Australian state electoral district

Elizabeth South Australia—House of Assembly
- Interactive map of electoral district boundaries
- State: South Australia
- Dates current: 1970–2006, 2018–present
- MP: Ella Shaw
- Party: Labor
- Namesake: Elizabeth, South Australia
- Electors: 28,323 (2026)
- Area: 25.0 km^{2} (9.7 sq mi)
- Demographic: Metropolitan
- Coordinates: 34°42′24″S 138°41′7″E
Electorates around Elizabeth:
Light	Light	Schubert
Taylor	Elizabeth	King
Taylor	Ramsay	King

Footnotes
- Electoral District map

Elizabeth is a single-member electoral district for the South Australian House of Assembly. It first existed from 1970 to 2006, when its boundaries were moved south and east and it was renamed to Little Para. The 2016 redistribution moved it further north and renamed it back to Elizabeth for the 2018 election. The district is in the outer northern suburbs of Adelaide, and named for the suburb of Elizabeth.

== First incarnation (1970–2006) ==
The district of Elizabeth was first created in 1970 when the number of electorates increased from 39 to 47 and was abolished in 2006. Though Elizabeth was historically a safe Labor seat, it was held for a time by independent-turned-Labor MP Martyn Evans.

Elizabeth was renamed Little Para following boundary changes in the 2003 redistribution which took effect at the 2006 state election.

== Current incarnation ==
The 2016 redistribution which took effect with the 2018 state election renamed Little Para back to Elizabeth, and moved the boundaries further north following the abolition of Napier to create King. It consisted of the suburbs of Blakeview, Craigmore, Elizabeth, Elizabeth Downs, Elizabeth East, Elizabeth Grove, Elizabeth Park, Elizabeth South and Elizabeth Vale.

As a result of being over quota the 2020 redistribution has moved the southern boundary which was the Little Para River further north with Elizabeth Vale and parts of Elizabeth South which contained the former Elizabeth Holden Car Plant now moved to Ramsay. Hogarth Road has now become the Southern Boundary and the suburb of Blakeview remains the Northern Boundary.

== Members for Elizabeth ==
First incarnation (1970–2006)
Member	Party	Term
John Clark	Labor	1970–1973
Peter Duncan	Labor	1973–1984
Martyn Evans	Independent	1984–1993
Martyn Evans	Labor	1993–1994
Lea Stevens	Labor	1994–2006
Second incarnation (2018–present)
Lee Odenwalder	Labor	2018–2026
Ella Shaw	Labor	2026–present

== Election results ==
Results of the 2026 South Australian state election in Elizabeth by voting booth.

2026 South Australian state election: Elizabeth
Party	Candidate	Votes	%	±%
Labor	Ella Shaw	8,506	39.9	−15.7
One Nation	Kym Hanton	7,090	33.3	+23.4
Greens	David Deex	2,208	10.4	+2.6
Liberal	Dawid Jurczak	1,368	6.4	−12.1
Family First	Sanja Hendrick	887	4.2	−3.6
Legalise Cannabis	Matthew Field	729	3.4	+3.4
Australian Family	Brae McKee	197	0.9	+0.9
Fair Go	Angela Rojas	174	0.8	+0.8
United Voice	Marco Lorenzi	147	0.7	+0.7
Total formal votes		21,306	93.0	−3.1
Informal votes		1,602	7.0	+3.1
Turnout		22,908	80.9	−2.0
Two-party-preferred result
Labor	Ella Shaw	11,607	54.5	−17.2
One Nation	Kym Hanton	9,699	45.5	+45.5
Labor hold				
