= District Council of Para Wirra =

District Council of Para Wirra South Australia
- Coordinates: 34.7816°S 138.8560°E
- Established: 1854
- Abolished: 1935
- Council seat: Maidstone
LGAs around District Council of Para Wirra:
Munno Para East (1854-1933); Munno Para (1933-1935)	Barossa West (1854-1888); Barossa (1888-1935)
Tea Tree Gully (1858-1935); Highercombe (1854-1935)	District Council of Para Wirra	Mount Crawford
East Torrens	Talunga	Talunga

The District Council of Para Wirra was a local government area of South Australia from 1854 to 1935, seated at Maidstone (later called Kersbrook).

It occupied the western half of the Hundred of Para Wirra, the eastern remainder being administered by the District Council of Mount Crawford, which was established the same day. The Mount Gould Range and the present-day Warren Conservation Park form what was once the boundary between Para Wirra and Mount Crawford.

== History ==
In 1935 Para Wirra amalgamated with the District Council of Talunga to form the new and District Council of Gumeracha.
