= Smithfield Plains, South Australia =

Smithfield Plains
- Suburb
- Interactive map of Smithfield Plains
- Coordinates: 34.6768°S 138.67674°E
- Country: Australia
- State: South Australia
- City: Adelaide
- LGA: City of Playford

Government
  - State electorate: Taylor
  - Federal division: Spence

Population
  - Total: 3,305 (SAL 2021)
- Postcode: 5114
Suburbs around Smithfield Plains
	Munno Para West	Munno Para
Andrews Farm	Smithfield Plains	Smithfield
	Davoren Park

Smithfield Plains is a northern suburb of Adelaide, South Australia in the City of Playford.

Smithfield Plains Post Office opened on 7 December 1967 and was located in the Shopping Centre on the corner of Peachey and Crittenden Roads.

== Education ==
The John Hartley School B-7 school was built in the 2010s, replacing several earlier schools in the area. Around the same time, Smithfield Plains High School on Coventry Road and Smithfield Plains Junior and Primary School both closed their campuses in a merger to become part of Mark Oliphant College which opened its new campus in 2011 in nearby Munno Para. The derelict Junior and Primary School buildings were demolished in early 2019 and the land has been subdivided for housing allotments. The former High School buildings which had been left derelict for 10 years were demolished in 2020.
