= Blakeview =

- Suburb
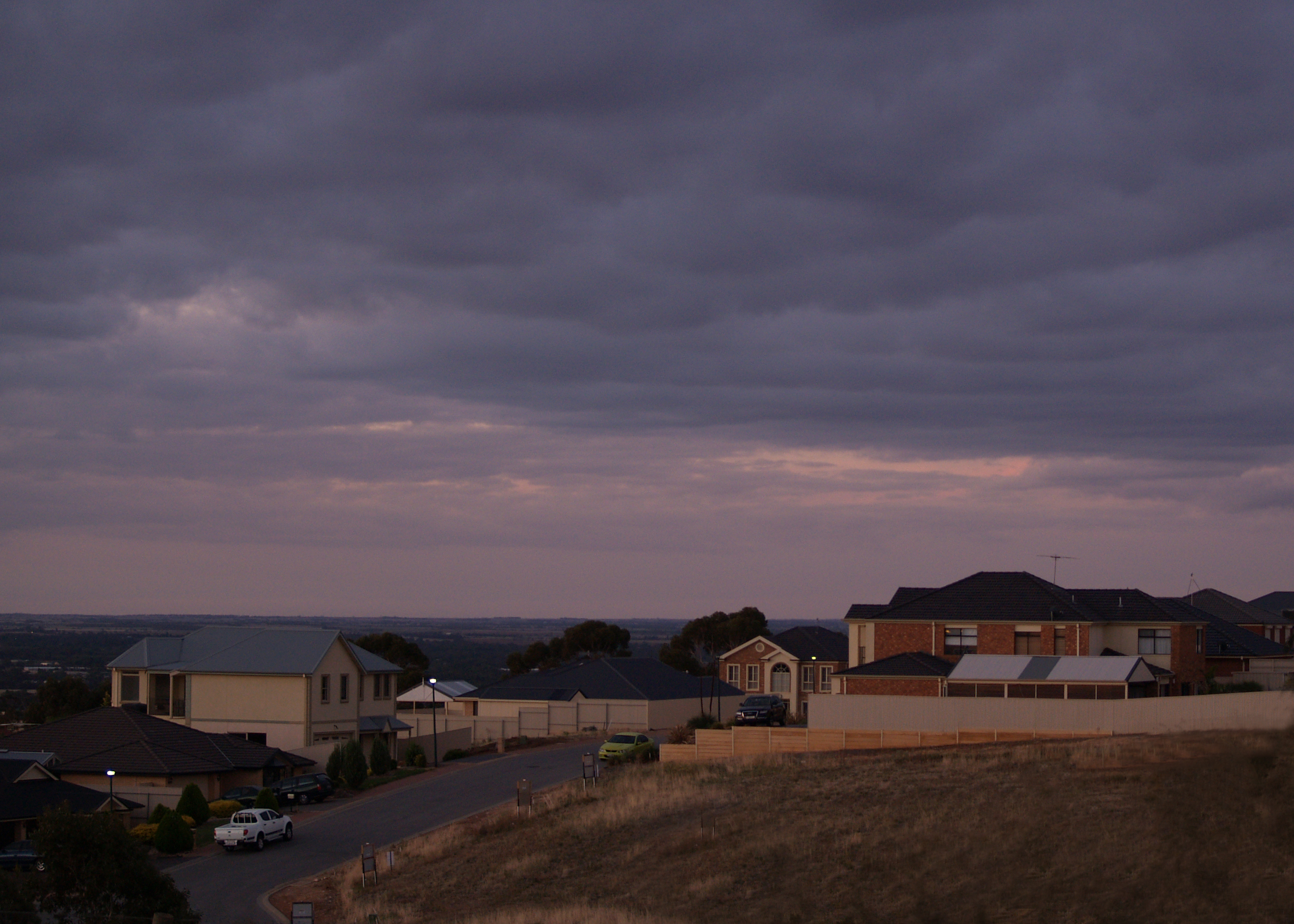
- Looking into Blakeview from Craigmore Road at twilight

- Country: Australia
- State: South Australia
- City: Adelaide
- LGA: City of Playford
- Location: 29 km (18 mi) N of Adelaide CBD
- Established: 1990

Government
  - State electorate: Elizabeth
  - Federal division: Spence

Population
  - Total: 8,979 (SAL 2021)
- Postcode: 5114
Suburbs around Blakeview
Kudla	Evanston South	Uleybury
Munno Para; Smithfield	Blakeview	Uleybury; Craigmore
Smithfield	Elizabeth Downs	Craigmore

Blakeview is a northern suburb of Adelaide, South Australia. It is located in the City of Playford. Blakeview is predominantly a residential suburb, but also has two commercial areas and two education areas.

== Geography ==
Blakeview is located to the northeast of Elizabeth and lies on the east side of Main North Road opposite Smithfield and Munno Para. There is a commercial area facing Main North Road in the oldest part of the suburb which was unofficially known as Smithfield East, opposite Smithfield Oval, which includes medical services and a service station.

Blakeview was gazetted as a suburb in 1990, taking territory from Smithfield and Munno Para that was east of Main North Road.

== Demographics ==
The 2021 Census by the Australian Bureau of Statistics counted 8,979 persons in Blakeview on census night. Of these, 48.8% were male and 51.2% were female.

The majority of residents (76.2%) of people were born in Australia. The most common other countries of birth were England 6.1%, India 1.6%, Philippines 1.4%, Scotland 0.8% and New Zealand 0.7%.

The median age of people in Blakeview was 31 years. Children aged 0 - 14 years made up 25.1% of the population and people aged 65 years and over made up 9.2% of the population.

== Blakes Crossing ==
In April 2009, Delfin began the development of 88 hectares (220 acres) of land east of Main North Road and north of Craigmore Road, converting it into a masterplanned residential community. In a similar vein to past planned communities by Delfin, Blakes Crossing has a distinct visual identity and atmosphere compared to the previously developed Blakeview suburb — although the development area retains the existing suburb name. The subdivision was officially launched by Michael O'Brien, the local State Member of Parliament, on 4 April 2009.

Houses built within the Blakes Crossing community are subject to land title encumbrances, with Delfin/Lendlease having guidelines in place to dictate acceptable architectural design and external finishes in accordance with their vision for the development. Encumbrances also placed restrictions on the positioning and appearance of external fixtures, such as clotheslines and TV aerials. Delfin/Lendlease also used encumbrances to control and influence the design and appearance of other South Australian urban developments they led, including West Lakes, Golden Grove and Mawson Lakes.

== Education ==
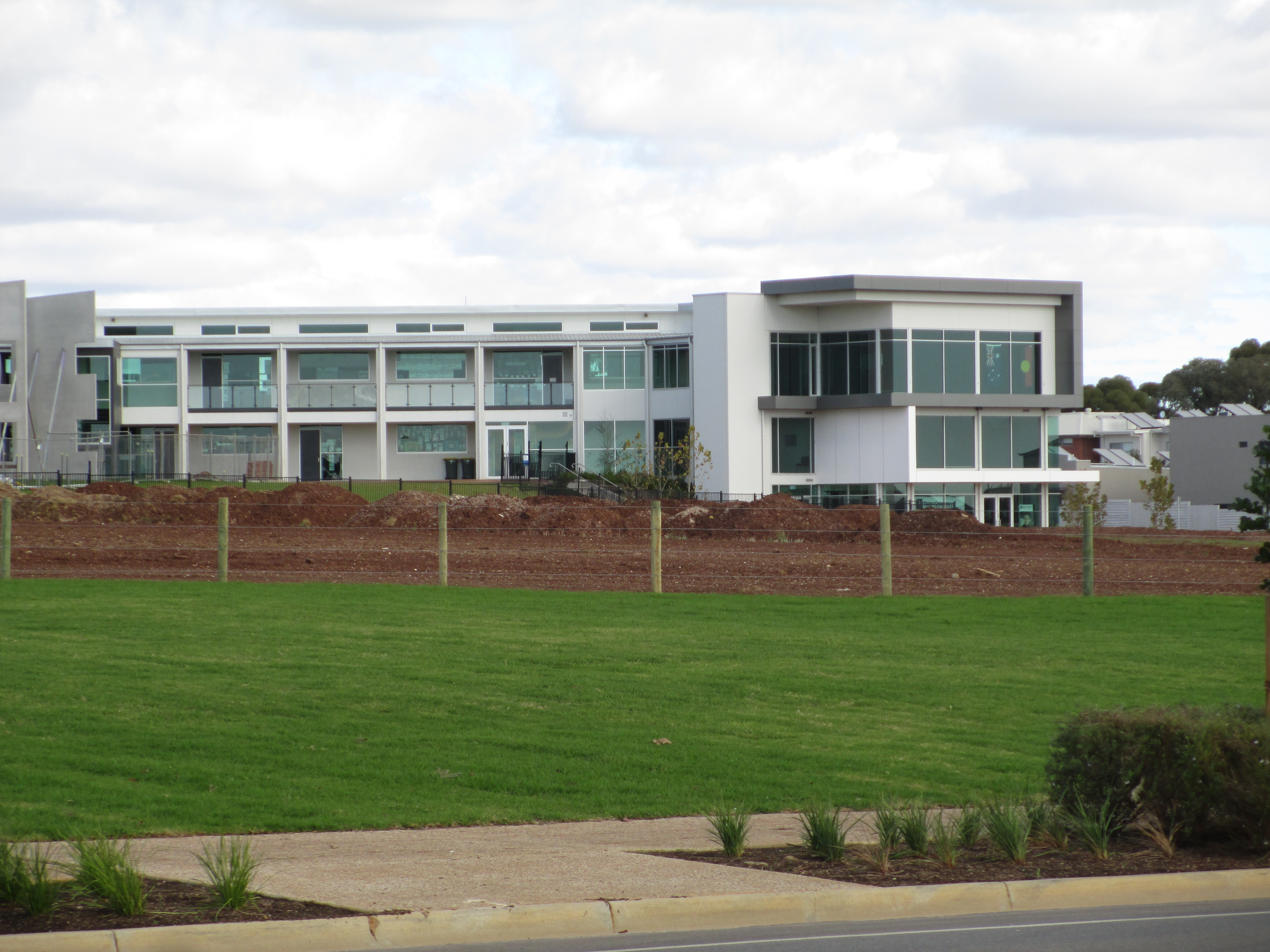
Blakeview Christian School buildings from Main Terrace, 2016

The southern education precinct off Uley Road and Park Lake Boulevard was established in 1992 includes Blakeview Primary School, Trinity College Blakeview Campus and Blakeview preschool off Jamieson Road being built adjacent to Craigmore High School (formerly Smithfield High) which opened in 1970.

Blakes Crossing Christian College operated by Christian Community Ministries opened for reception to year 5 in 2014 and intends to gradually extend to year 12 and a total of 700 students. At the beginning of 2014 it had only six students enrolled, using the Lendlease land sales offices for classrooms until the school's own buildings could be constructed. It is now sited in its own buildings, not far from the Blakes Crossing shopping precinct and parks.

== Facilities and attractions ==
=== Parks ===
There are several parks and reserves throughout the suburb, especially along Smith Creek and Main Terrace. Many of the parks are provided with playground equipment.

=== Shopping ===
There is a neighbourhood shopping precinct on Main Terrace with two supermarkets, food outlets, butcher, newsagent, medical services and a bottle shop. There is also a commercial precinct fronting Main North Road in the southern part of Blakeview with a fuel outlet, health and retail facilities, and another fuel outlet on Main North Road in the northern part of the suburb.

Blakes Crossing also has a commercial and retail precinct off Craigmore Road.

== Transportation ==
Blakeview is serviced by Main North Road, connecting the suburb to Adelaide city centre.

Blakeview is serviced by several Adelaide Metro bus services to Elizabeth, Smithfield, Munno Para, the Adelaide CBD and a school bus to Roma Mitchell Secondary College.

== See also ==
Media related to Blakeview, South Australia at Wikimedia Commons
