= City of Playford =

Coordinates: 34°43′S 138°40′E

- Local government area
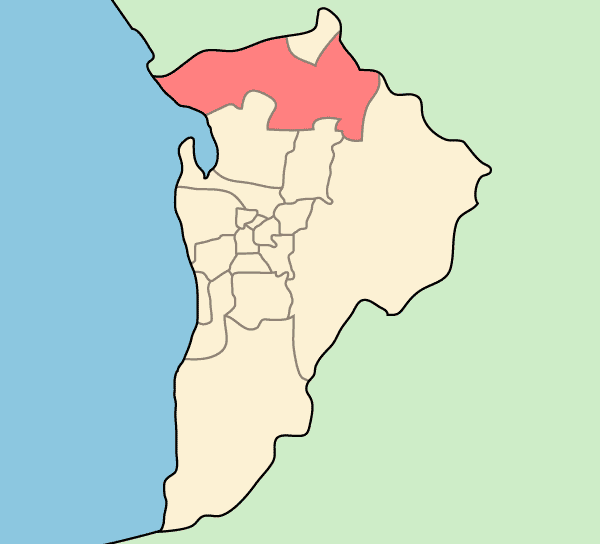

- Interactive map of City of Playford
- Country: Australia
- State: South Australia
- Region: Northern Adelaide
- Council seat: Elizabeth

Government
  - Type: Mayor–council government
  - Mayor: Glenn Docherty
  - State electorate: Elizabeth, King, Light, Ramsay, Schubert, Taylor
  - Federal division: Spence

Area
  - Total: 345 km^{2} (133 sq mi)

Population
  - Total: 99,190 (LGA 2021)
  - Density: 287.5/km^{2} (745/sq mi)
- Website: www.playford.sa.gov.au
LGAs around City of Playford
Adelaide Plains Council	Light Regional Council	Town of Gawler
		Barossa Council
City of Salisbury	City of Tea Tree Gully	Adelaide Hills Council

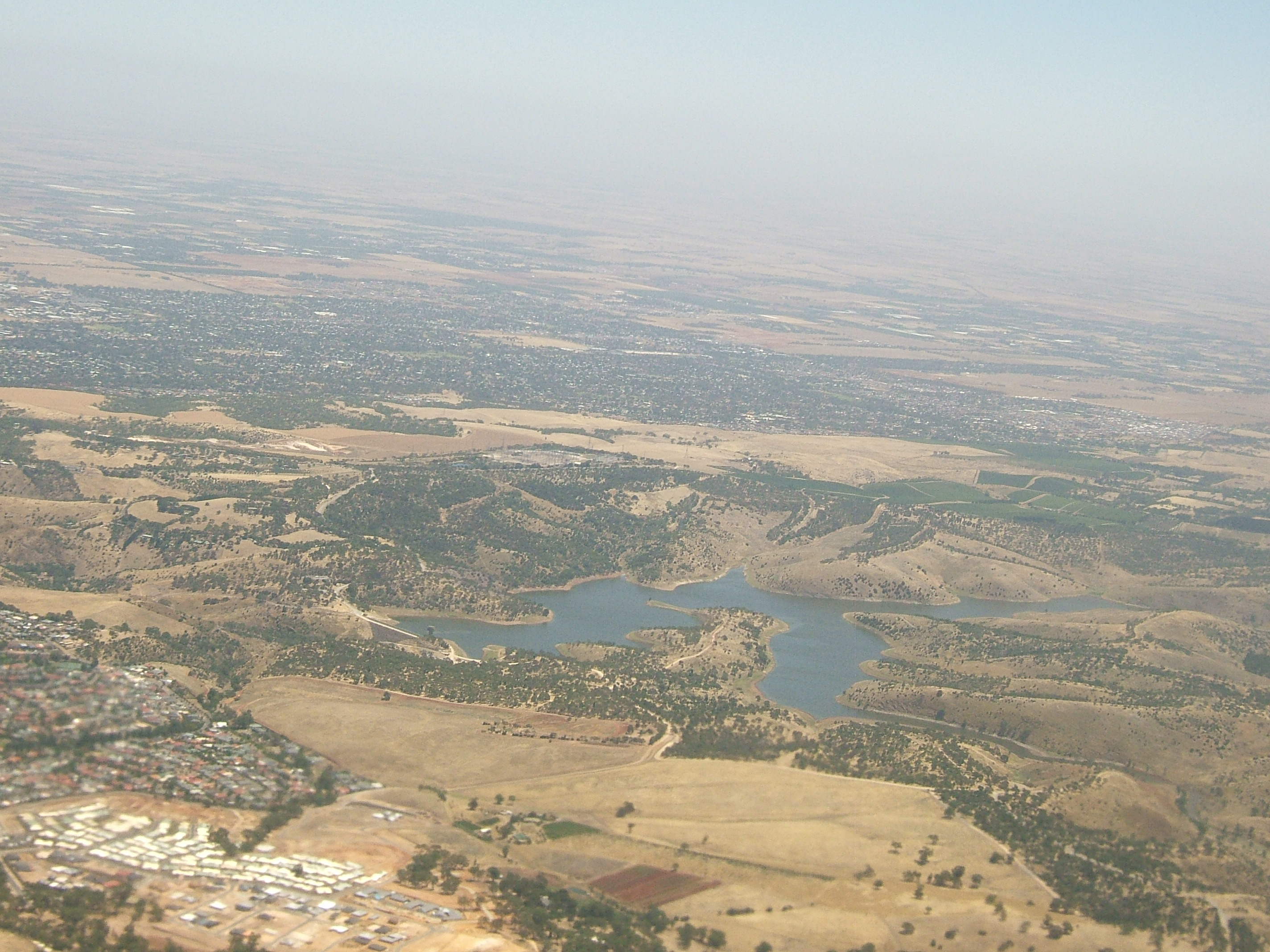
Looking northwest over Greenwith and the Little Para Reservoir from an aeroplane flying west down the River Torrens valley. The dark area on the far side of the reservoir is the suburbs of the City of Playford. In the background are the outer northern suburbs of Adelaide, and the northern Adelaide Plains of the Gawler River.

The City of Playford is a local government area of South Australia in Adelaide's northern suburbs. It was named in recognition of Sir Thomas Playford, who played a part in the development of the area, and was South Australia's premier from 1938–1965. The city covers an area of 345 km^{2} (133 sq mi), and is home to over 113,000 residents. Playford was the fastest growing local government area in South Australia in the 2010s.

== History ==
=== Origins ===
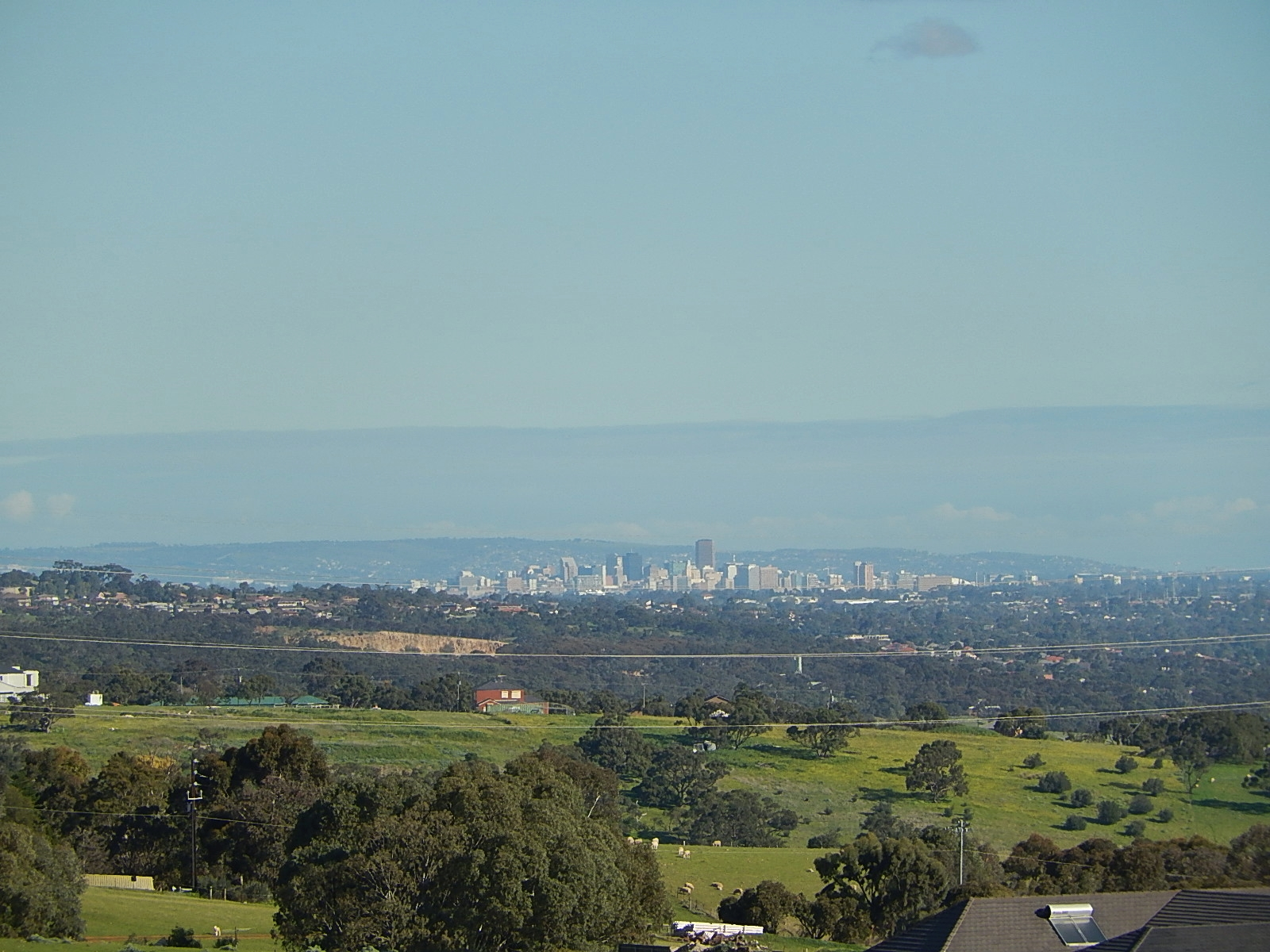
The Adelaide skyline from Hillbank in the City of Playford. The Adelaide city centre is located approximately 29.7 km (18 miles) from the City of Playford.

The LGA was formed in 1997 through the merger of the City of Elizabeth and the City of Munno Para, which were formed in 1955 and 1958, respectively. It was named in recognition of Sir Thomas Playford, who played a part in the development of the area, and was South Australia's premier from 1938–1965.

Prior to the 1950s, most of the area surrounding the townships of Munno Para and Elizabeth were farming estates. After the end of the Second World War and the accompanying shortage of materials, the state government decided that South Australia needed to grow and become an industrialized state. A "satellite city" was planned for the Elizabeth area, and the South Australian Housing Trust initiated a housing development programme in the area, with a purchase of 3,000 acres (1,200 ha) of land. The City of Elizabeth was formed on 16 November 1955, being named after Queen Elizabeth II, who visited the city in 1963. The District Council of Munno Para was formed on 6 November 1958 following the renaming of the District Council of Munno Para East which was Proclaimed on 10 November 1853.

=== 1997 to 2010 ===
The first mayor of the City of Playford was Marilyn Baker, who had been the last mayor of the City of Elizabeth. She continued to hold that role until the 2006 council elections, when she was narrowly defeated by Martin Lindsell, the last mayor of the City of Munno Para.

After 1997, the council planned and built a number of new housing developments aimed at attracting young working couples and families in an attempt to rejuvenate the area. A new Civic Centre including council chambers, library, theatre and function centre was built. Other developments of the period included a new library in the Munno Para Shopping City in Smithfield, and a revamp of the Elizabeth shopping centre, including an 8-screen cinema complex.

In 2003 it was announced that A$1 billion would be allocated to rejuvenate the Peachey Belt. Known as the Playford North Urban Regeneration project, it was expected that the population of the area would increase from 13,000 residents to 30,000 in 15 years and involve the demolition of most of the Housing SA homes. the project has since been renamed "Playford Alive".

"As part of the 30-year Plan for greater Adelaide, significant growth and investment is pouring into Playford from business. Rapidly increasing employment coupled with new land releases has driven population growth and improved living standards."

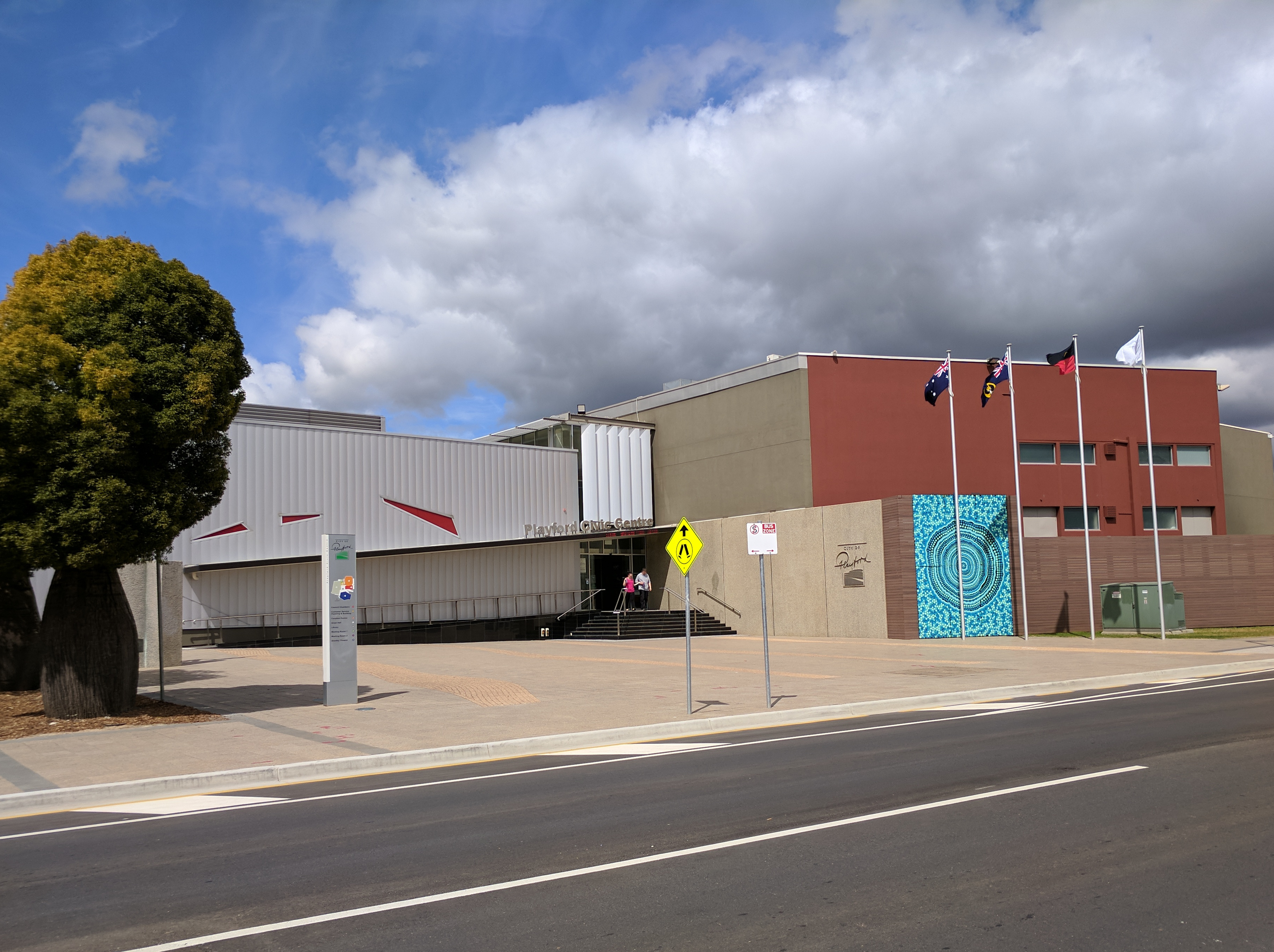
The Civic Centre in 2017

=== 2010 to present ===
Mayor Martin Lindsell was defeated in the 2010 local council election by Glenn Docherty, the council's youngest ever mayor.

The council elected in 2010 started the creation of Playford Health Precinct around the Lyell McEwin Hospital.

The SCT Logistics Rail Freight Terminal, opened in January 2011 provided for goods and services to be transported by road and rail more efficiently and quickly. Some believe that Playford will become the logistical and advanced distribution capital of South Australia.

The A$750 million expansion within the RAAF Base Edinburgh, including facilities for 7th RAR (Mechanized Army Battalion), was largely completed in 2011.

As of 2010 the council has been involved in discussions regarding expansion of the Elizabeth City Centre (the major shopping precinct in Playford) on to 30–40 hectares (74–99 acres) of land to the west of the train line.

As of 2011 the Playford council is working with the South Australian Government to release 1,000 hectares (2,500 acres) of industrial land in the greater Edinburgh Parks region, with the intention of attracting and supporting 38,000 jobs in the northern part of Adelaide.

In 2011, Mayor Docherty stated he aimed to make Elizabeth the second central business district of Adelaide. He envisaged a movement away from low density commercial and "quarter-acre block" housing to multiple storey mixed use commercial and residential developments in Elizabeth and other central parts of the council area.

Work has started on the Playford Commercial Hub, which is an 8 story Office and Commercial Tower built by the Pelligra Group.

In April 2013 the council announced its 2043 Playford Community Vision.

From 2012 to 2015 the council partnered with the University of Adelaide to launch the Stretton Centre, a physical home in Playford for research into regional innovation. Its "anchor tenant" is the Adelaide University's Australian Workplace Innovation & Social Research Centre (WISeR). Playford Council was assisted by a A$11.3 million grant from the Australian Government for the research centre. The Stretton Centre includes the Stretton Research Centre (occupied by WISeR), the (new) community library, public and private community meeting spaces and the Innovation Design Lab, which is to showcase new innovations and technologies in relevant to the community.

Docherty was re-elected unopposed to continue as mayor in the 2014 local government elections.

=== Royal visits ===
The City of Playford (and its predecessor, the City of Elizabeth) has had a number of visits by members of the Royal Family:

- 1963 visit by Queen Elizabeth II
- 1977 visit by Queen Elizabeth II
- 1986 visit by Prince Philip, Duke of Edinburgh
- April 2014 visit by Prince William, Duke of Cambridge and Catherine, Duchess of Cambridge

== Council ==
Diagram of Playford's council: Independent: 8 seats Vacant independent: 1 seat Labor: 6 seats

Map of Playford by wards: Ward 1 Ward 2 Ward 3 Ward 4 Ward 5

Results of the 2022 South Australian local elections in Playford: Independent (9) Independent Labor (6)

The Council consists of 16 Elected Members comprising a Mayor, and 15 Ward Councillors. The Council area is divided into five wards, with three Counicllors elected from each ward.

The current council as of December 2022 is:

Ward	Party Affiliation	Councillor	First elected	Notes
Mayor	Liberal	Glenn Docherty	2003	
Ward One	Independent	Peter Rentoulis		
Ward One	Labor	Rebecca Vandepeear		
Ward One	Labor	Clint Marsh		
Ward Two	Independent	Jane Onuzans		
Ward Two	Independent	Gay Smallwood-Smith		
Ward Two	Labor	Chantelle Karlsen		Deputy Mayor
Ward Three	Independent	Andrew Craig		
Ward Three	Independent	David Kerrison		
Ward Three	Independent	Tanya Smiljanic		
Ward Four		Vacant		See note: Katrina Stroet resigned from Council in January 2026. A supplementary election will not be held as it falls within 12 months of the 2026 Local Government elections.
Ward Four	Independent	Marilyn Baker		
Ward Four	Labor	Zahra Bayani		
Ward Five	Labor	Akram Arifi		
Ward Five	Labor	Misty Norris		
Ward Five	Independent	Shirley Halls		

== Mayors of City of Playford ==
- Marilyn Baker (1997-2006)
- Martin Lindsell (2006-2010)
- Glenn Docherty (2010 -Current)

== Demographics ==
The city covers an area of 345 km^{2} (133 sq mi), and was estimated to have a population of 113,123. Playford has been the fastest growing local government area (LGA) in South Australia over the 2010s. In the five years to 2021, the Playford LGA experienced the greatest population growth of all greater Adelaide LGAs, increasing by more than 7500 residents. However, its annual rate in the 12 months to 2021 was lower than Mount Barker, Adelaide Plains and Gawler.

== Suburbs ==
- Andrews Farm (5114)
- Angle Vale (5117)
- Bibaringa (5118)
- Blakeview (5114)
- Buckland Park (5120)
- Craigmore (5114)
- Davoren Park (5113)
- Edinburgh North (5113)
- Elizabeth (5112)
- Elizabeth Downs (5113)
- Elizabeth East (5112)
- Elizabeth Grove (5112)
- Elizabeth North (5113)
- Elizabeth Park (5113)
- Elizabeth South (5112)
- Elizabeth Vale (5112)
- Eyre (5121)
- Gould Creek (5114)
- Hillbank (5112)
- Humbug Scrub (5114)
- MacDonald Park (5121)
- Munno Para (5115)
- Munno Para West (5115)
- Munno Para Downs (5115)
- One Tree Hill (5114)
- Penfield (5121)
- Penfield Gardens (5121)
- Sampson Flat (5114)
- Smithfield (5114)
- Smithfield Plains (5114)
- Uleybury (5114)
- Virginia (5120)
- Waterloo Corner (5110)
- Yattalunga (5114)

== Services and facilities ==
=== Parks and recreation ===
Fremont Park is located immediately east of the Elizabeth City Centre. Providing recreation and leisure facilities, the park features a large lake with fountain and waterfalls, a rotunda for band performances and two playgrounds. The park also contains an adult fitness gym and is the host venue for many community events including Australia Day celebrations, school Holiday programs, weddings, and other private functions.

The Aquadome aquatic centre is the largest such facility in northern Adelaide. Included in this multi-purpose facility are a 50-metre pool, a beach entry leisure pool, café, a creche, outdoor picnic areas, a large carpark, and easy access to bus and rail transport. The Health Club, opened in 2009, contains a modern gym and fitness centre.

Located on Blackburn Road, Hillbank, Jo Gapper Park is a major regional park. It has tennis court and basketball court, which are lit at night, playground, barbecues, shelter sheds and walking trails. It has a sealed carpark which is open from dawn until dusk.

Stebonheath Park, Ken Patterson Reserve, Jubilee Park and the Munno Para Wetlands are other public green spaces in the City of Playford.

The Playford Lakes Golf Course, which opened in 1993 as North Lakes, is located in Munno Para West, measures 5,730 m (18,800 ft) for 9 holes, and is par 70.

=== Libraries service ===
The Playford library is split across two locations: Elizabeth and Munno Para.

=== Youth services ===
Young people have a number of services and activities supported by the council, including:

- Northern Sound System – a dedicated youth centre, including recording studios and a live music venue, which allows young people to learn, create and develop their musical talents, located in Elizabeth
- Playford Youth Advisory Committee – a body intended to be the voice of young people aged 12 to 25 in the Playford Region meeting fortnightly at the Northern Sound System
- Jibba Jabba Radio – a youth development program which gives young people in Playford the opportunity to produce and broadcast a youth radio program on Adelaide's PBA FM radio station

=== Waste management and recycling ===
Garbage, recycling, and green waste collection services are provided by the Northern Adelaide Waste Management Authority.

== Sports teams ==
The City of Playford is home to several sports teams, including:

- Central District Football Club (Australian rules football - South Australian National Football League (SANFL))
- Playford City Patriots (Association football/soccer - FFSA South Australian Premier League)

== See also ==
- List of Adelaide parks and gardens
- List of Adelaide suburbs
- Local Government Areas of South Australia
