= Munno Para West, South Australia =

Munno Para West
- Suburb
- Coordinates: 34.659°S 138.666°E
- Country: Australia
- State: South Australia
- City: Adelaide
- LGA: City of Playford

Government
  - State electorate: Light
  - Federal division: Spence

Population
  - Total: 7,577 (SAL 2021)
- Postcode: 5115
Suburbs around Munno Para West
Angle Vale	Munno Para Downs	Kudla
MacDonald Park	Munno Para West	Munno Para
Andrews Farm	Smithfield Plains	Smithfield

Munno Para West (pronounced /ˈmʌnoʊ ˈpɑːrə/) is a northern suburb of Adelaide, South Australia. It is within the City of Playford.

Munno Para west is bounded by the Northern Expressway on the west, Curtis Road to the south, Stebonheath Road to the east and a line parallel to Fradd Road but north of the Almond Grove housing estate to the north. The boundaries were adjusted in June 2011 to ensure that the new expressway did not divide the suburb.
