= Uleybury =

- Suburb
- Interactive map of Uleybury
- Coordinates: 34°40′23″S 138°44′31″E
- Country: Australia
- State: South Australia
- City: Adelaide
- LGA: City of Playford
- Location: 9 km (5.6 mi) from Elizabeth
- Established: c. 1850

Government
  - State electorate: King
  - Federal division: Spence

Population
  - Total: 291 (SAL 2021)
- Postcode: 5114
Suburbs around Uleybury
Evanston South	Bibaringa	Yattalunga
Blakeview	Uleybury	Yattalunga
Craigmore	One Tree Hill	One Tree Hill

Uleybury (pronounced /ˈjuːliːbəri/ or /ˈjuːləbri/) is a rural locality near Adelaide, South Australia. It is located at the eastern side of the City of Playford local government area, just north of One Tree Hill along Gawler-One Tree Hill Road.

== History ==
A weaver named Moses Bendle Garlick (c. 1784–1859) following his participation in the Peninsular War against Napoleon (Napoleon I, Emperor of the French) a part in the Napoleonic Wars, he returned to England to find that machine-made cloth had taken over the market, displacing the hand-loom products and so he made the decision to migrated with his family to South Australia in 1837 on the ship Katherine Stewart Forbes. He settled first at North Adelaide, where he was in business as a builder until at least 1848. He then took up land at Munno Para East, naming it Uley, after his native village Uley in Gloucestershire, England, and there built a home which the family occupied from around 1850. His eldest son, the architect Daniel Garlick, opened a practice in nearby Gawler. Moses was a devout Baptist and lay preacher, and donated to the Church an acre of land where in 1851 he built the Uley Chapel at a cost of £400. Upon his death on 1 October 1859 Moses was buried in the small Cemetery which adjoined the Chapel.

The settlement became known as "Uley Bury" or "Uleybury" around 1855, Uleybury School was erected in 1856 on church land, and Rev. J. P. Buttfield operated it as a church school until 1874, when the Government assumed control. It was closed in 1971 and reopened as a museum in 1979.

The District Council of Munno Para East (1853-1933) District Office was located at the former Uley Chapel (demolished in 1981).

== Geography ==
Uleybury is located to the northeast of the Elizabeth conurbation, just north of One Tree Hill. At the ABS 2001 census, Uleybury had a population of 543 people living in 177 dwellings.

== Facilities ==
Uleybury School Museum, on the National Trust heritage list, was built in 1856 and was still functioning as a school until 1971 in the original buildings. It now offers tours, old time school lessons and various other events and includes information, photographs and memorabilia of past students.

Uleybury Wines, started in 1995 by Tony Pipicella, operates a cellar door where visitors can sample wine and other local produce.

== Transport ==
The area is not serviced by Adelaide public transport.

== See also ==
- City of Playford
- District Council of Munno Para East
- List of Adelaide suburbs
