= Elizabeth North =

- Suburb
- Coordinates: 34.70079°S 138.67578°E
- Country: Australia
- State: South Australia
- City: Adelaide
- LGA: City of Playford

Government
  - State electorate: Taylor
  - Federal division: Spence

Population
  - Total: 3,588 (SAL 2021)
- Postcode: 5113
Suburbs around Elizabeth North
| Davoren Park | Smithfield | Elizabeth Downs |
| Davoren Park | Elizabeth North | Elizabeth Downs |
| Edinburgh North | Elizabeth | Elizabeth Park |

Elizabeth North is a northern suburb of Adelaide, South Australia in the City of Playford. It is sandwiched between Main North Road to the east and the Gawler railway line to its west immediately north of Elizabeth and south of Smithfield. It is served by the Womma and Broadmeadows railway stations.

It was established in the late 1950s as a residential suburb of the planned City of Elizabeth. Like its neighbours, including Elizabeth and Elizabeth South, it was configured as a local community around a small shopping centre containing a supermarket, bank, hotel and service station along with other shops.

The Catholic Church in Elizabeth North is dedicated to St Thomas More.
