= Elizabeth Park, South Australia =

Elizabeth Park
- Suburb
- Coordinates: 34.71239°S 138.68543°E
- Country: Australia
- State: South Australia
- City: Adelaide
- LGA: City of Playford

Government
  - State electorate: Elizabeth
  - Federal division: Spence

Population
  - Total: 4,428 (SAL 2021)
- Postcode: 5113
Suburbs around Elizabeth Park
| Elizabeth North | Elizabeth Downs | Craigmore |
| Elizabeth North | Elizabeth Park | Craigmore |
| Elizabeth | Elizabeth East | Hillbank |

Elizabeth Park is a northern suburb of Adelaide, South Australia in the City of Playford. It is situated to the east of Main North Road and includes Fremont Park and other open space along Adams Creek.
