= Munno Para railway station =

Railway station in Adelaide, South Australia

Munno Para
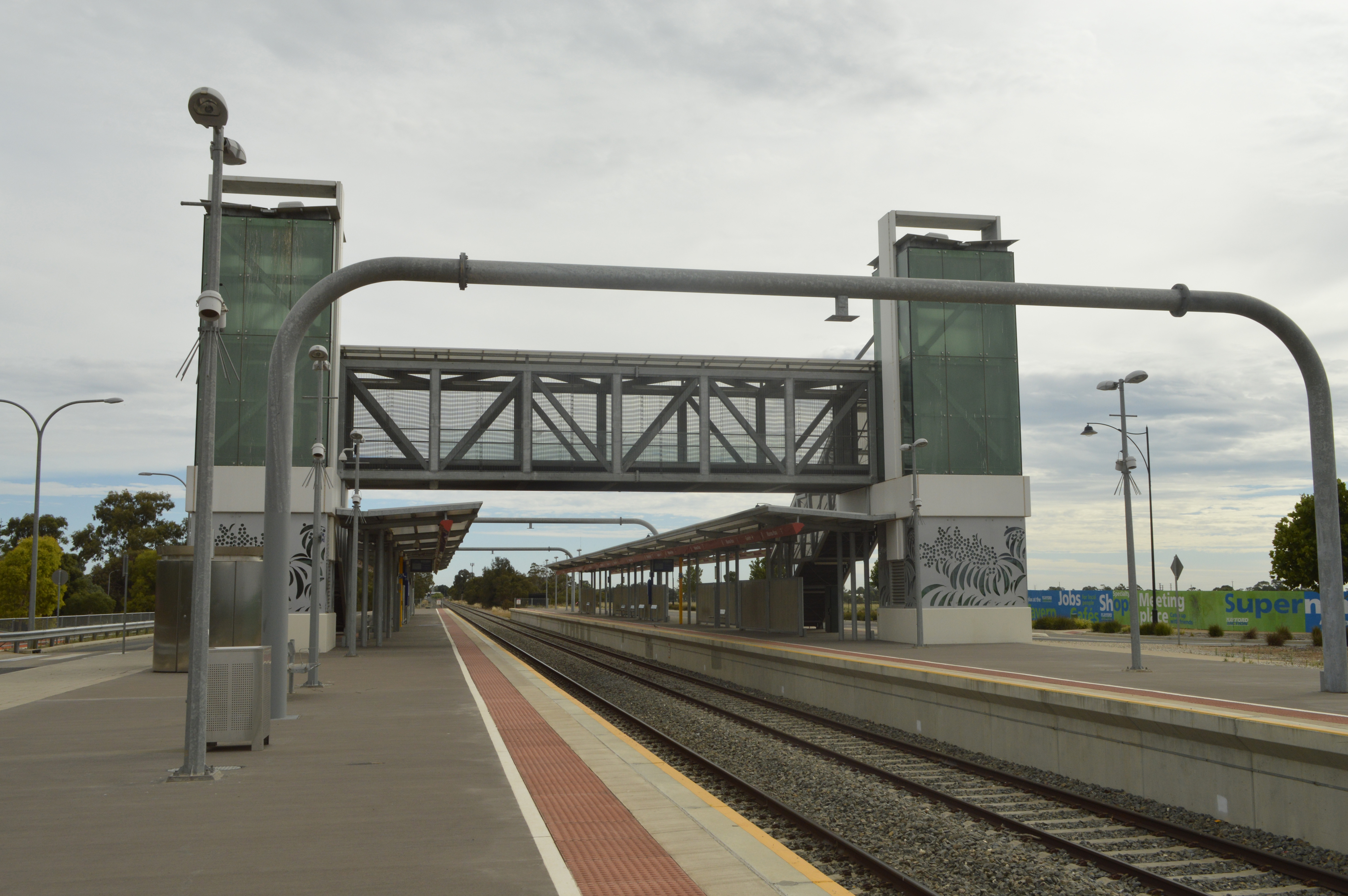
- Southbound view from Platform 2, January 2018

General information
- Location: Alawoona Road, Munno Para
- Coordinates: 34°40′00″S 138°41′51″E
- Owner: Department for Infrastructure & Transport
- Operator: Adelaide Metro
- Line: Gawler
- Distance: 32 km from Adelaide
- Platforms: 2
- Tracks: 2
- Connections: Bus

Construction
- Structure type: Ground
- Parking: Yes
- Cycle facilities: Yes
- Accessible: Yes

Other information
- Station code: 16545 (to City); 18555 (to Gawler Central)
- Website: Adelaide Metro

History
- Opened: 1978
- Rebuilt: September 2011

Services
Preceding station	Adelaide Metro	Following station
Smithfield towards Adelaide	Gawler line	Kudla towards Gawler Central
Location

Munno Para railway station is located on the Gawler line. Situated in the northern Adelaide suburb of Munno Para (pronounced /ˈmʌnoʊ ˈpɑːrə/), it is located 32 kilometres (20 mi) from Adelaide station.

== History ==
Munno Para station opened in 1978.

Originally consisting of two 95 metre side platforms, in March 2012, two new side platforms capable of accommodating six carriages were built 60 metres south of the original station. This was in connection with the plans to electrify the line, which was completed in early 2022 and expected to reopen on April 30. The platforms are connected by an overpass with lifts.

The station was the site of a fatal collision on 5 February 2019 where a man from Smithfield Plains who was illegally on the tracks was struck by a train and died at the scene.

== Platforms and Services ==
Munno Para has two side platforms and is serviced by Adelaide Metro. Trains are scheduled every 30 minutes, seven days a week. There is a small bus interchange on platform 2, adjacent to Alawoona Rd. A pedestrian overpass is located on the northern end of the station, which includes lifts on either side.

Platform	Destination
1	Gawler and Gawler Central
2	Adelaide

== Bus transfers ==
Bus transfers: Stop 94 (Munno Para Station)
Route no.	Destination & route details
440	Elizabeth Interchange via Hamblynn Road
443	Munno Para Loop via Smithfield station & Hamblynn Road
