= Davoren Park =

Davoren Park Adelaide, South Australia
- Coordinates: 34°41′29″S 138°40′5″E
- Population: 6,392 (SAL 2021)
- Established: 1993
- Postcode(s): 5113
- LGA(s): City of Playford
- State electorate(s): Taylor
- Federal division(s): Spence
Suburbs around Davoren Park:
| Andrews Farm | Smithfield Plains | Smithfield |
| Eyre | Davoren Park | Elizabeth North |
| | Edinburgh North |

Davoren Park is a suburb at the northern extent of the Adelaide metropolitan area, South Australia in the City of Playford. The suburb was formed as renaming of Elizabeth Field and the residential northern part of Elizabeth West which at the time were in the City of Munno Para. on 11 November 1993. It was named after Davoren Road which is on the northern boundary of the suburb adjacent to Smithfield Plains. The Davoren family lived in Smithfield. Austin Davoren, who was a railway employee at Smithfield, died on 2 August 1924.

The Playford North Urban Renewal project to expand and upgrade the area commenced in 2007 and is expected to take 10–15 years. The project focuses on the Peachey Belt (an unofficial designation roughly comprising Davoren Park, Smithfield and Smithfield Plains), which has been identified as a disadvantaged area.

== In popular culture ==
- Davoren Park is featured prominently in the second season of the Australian political thriller Secret City.

== See also ==
- City of Playford
- List of Adelaide suburbs
