= Munno Para Downs, South Australia =

Munno Para Downs
- Suburb
- Coordinates: 34.64716°S 138.67813°E
- Country: Australia
- State: South Australia
- City: Adelaide
- LGA: City of Playford

Government
  - State electorate: Light
  - Federal division: Spence

Population
  - Total: 181 (SAL 2021)
- Postcode: 5115
Suburbs around Munno Para Downs
	Hillier	Kudla
Angle Vale	Munno Para Downs	Evanston South
Munno Para West	Munno Para	Blakeview

Munno Para Downs (pronounced /ˈmʌnoʊ ˈpɑːrə/) is a northern suburb of Adelaide, South Australia in the City of Playford.

The suburb was named in 1983 from part of the district of Munno Para. The boundaries were adjusted in 2011 after the construction of the Northern Expressway. The suburb boundaries are (clockwise from western point) Northern Expressway, Angle Vale Road, Dalkeith Road, Main North Road, Alawoona Road and that alignment extended past the northern edge of the older suburb of Munno Para including Field Road and the boundaries of paddocks and orchards back to the Northern Expressway.

The area is crossed by the Gawler railway line, but there is no station in Munno Para Downs, the nearest is Kudla, north of Dalkeith Road. Dalkeith brigade of the South Australian Country Fire Service is based in Munno Para Downs on the corner of Dalkeith and Coventry Roads.
