= District Council of Munno Para West =

- Local government area
- Coordinates: 34°40′50″S 138°41′33″E
- Country: Australia
- State: South Australia
- Established: 27 April 1854
- Abolished: 22 June 1933
- Council seat: Penfield
LGAs around District Council of Munno Para West
Port Gawler	Mudla Wirra; Mudla Wirra South	Gawler South
	District Council of Munno Para West	Munno Para East
Yatala; Yatala North	Yatala; Yatala North	Highercombe

The District Council of Munno Para West (pronounced /ˈmʌnoʊ ˈpɑːrə/) was a local government area of South Australia on the central Adelaide Plains from 1854 to 1933.

== History ==
The council was established on 27 April 1854, bringing local government to the western half of the Hundred of Munno Para, the District Council of Munno Para East having been formed the year before.

At the time of its creation, the Munno Para West council area was bounded on the south by the Little Para River (which derives its name from the Kaurna term pari, meaning "stream of flowing water") and on the north by the Gawler River. The eastern boundary the District Council of Munno Para East (Main North Road) and western boundary was Port Wakefield Road. It included the rural townships of Virginia, Smithfield, Penfield, Angle Vale, Salisbury North and Gawler Blocks, the latter being severed by the District Council of Gawler South in 1899 and later merged with the Corporate Town of Gawler.

The council wards of St Kilda and Virginia West were added to the District Council later, in 1886.

== Council Meetings ==
Early Council meetings were held at Plough and Harrow Inn, Penfield. The building was destroyed by fire in 1899.

== Council Abolishment ==
Despite a Deputation from the Munno Para West District Council to the Minister of Local Government in May 1933, following a recommendation from Local Government Areas Commission, the District Council of Munno Para West was abolished on 22 June 1933, when parts were severed and added to District Council of Munno Para East and Municipality of Gawler, and the rest combined with Yatala North to form the new District Council of Salisbury.

== Notable residents ==
John Harvey - Founder of Salisbury was elected chairman in March 1856.
