= Edinburgh North, South Australia =

Edinburgh North
- Suburb
- Interactive map of Edinburgh North
- Coordinates: 34.705°S 138.66°E
- Country: Australia
- State: South Australia
- City: Adelaide
- LGA: City of Playford

Government
  - State electorate: Taylor
  - Federal division: Spence

Population
  - Total: 0 (SAL 2016)
- Postcode: 5113
Suburbs around Edinburgh North
Eyre	Davoren Park
Penfield	Edinburgh North	Elizabeth North
	Edinburgh	Elizabeth

Edinburgh North is a northern suburb of Adelaide. It is in the City of Playford local government area, the state electoral seat of Taylor and the federal electoral seat of Spence.

The suburb of Edinburgh North was gazetted on 27 October 2011. It renamed Elizabeth West plus a small area of Penfield. The suburb is mostly industrial except for the St Patrick's Technical College located in the South East section and sporting facilities in the North East section adjacent to Womma Road and train station. The Playford City soccer club is located at Ramsay Park. None of the suburb is zoned residential.
