= Smithfield, South Australia =

Smithfield
- Suburb
- Coordinates: 34.6859°S 138.6868°E
- Country: Australia
- State: South Australia
- City: Adelaide
- LGA: City of Playford
- Location: 30 km (19 mi) NE of Adelaide city centre
- Established: 1854

Government
  - State electorate: Taylor
  - Federal division: Spence

Population
  - Total: 2,482 (SAL 2021)
- Postcode: 5114
Suburbs around Smithfield
Smithfield Plains	Munno Para	Blakeview
Davoren Park	Smithfield	Blakeview
Davoren Park	Elizabeth North	Elizabeth Downs

Smithfield is a suburb in the northern outskirts of Adelaide, South Australia. It is in the City of Playford.

== Geography ==
Smithfield has Main North Road as its eastern boundary, with service stations, the historic Smithfield Hotel and several other businesses and private residences. Anderson Walk is the southern boundary of the original Township village subdivided by John Smith, which was arranged in a grid with Augusta Square in the centre. West of the older residential area is an industrial zone along the railway line, with Smithfield railway station on the south side of Anderson Walk. Munno Para Shopping City is on the south side of Smith Creek. There are more residential areas south and west of the railway station, and an Army Reserve depot west of the shopping centre which is home to the 3rd/9th Light Horse (South Australian Mounted Rifles) and 49 ACU Army Cadets.

== History ==
=== Early Settlement ===
Smithfield was an early settlement established between Salisbury and Gawler. Originally named ‘Smith’s Creek’ after John Smith a Scottish pioneer and one of the first european settlers in the area. In 1847 Smith was granted sections 1714, 1715 and 1719 along the Main North Road in the Hundred of Munno Para. The first home Smith built for his family was on Section 1714 with part of the building being used as the first inn in the area. Within six years he had purchased fourteen more sections of land and became the largest land owner in the area. Other early land owners who established farms in the district were also Scottish immigrants including James Umpherston, Gavin Scoular (a nephew of James Umpherston) who established Blair Farm and Hon. Thomas Hogarth M.P who built a homestead called Blair Place both located to the east on the hills face which following residential subdivisions commencing in the late 1970s was renamed to the suburb of Craigmore the meaning in Scottish for "Craig" is "rocky hill" and "More" is "big".

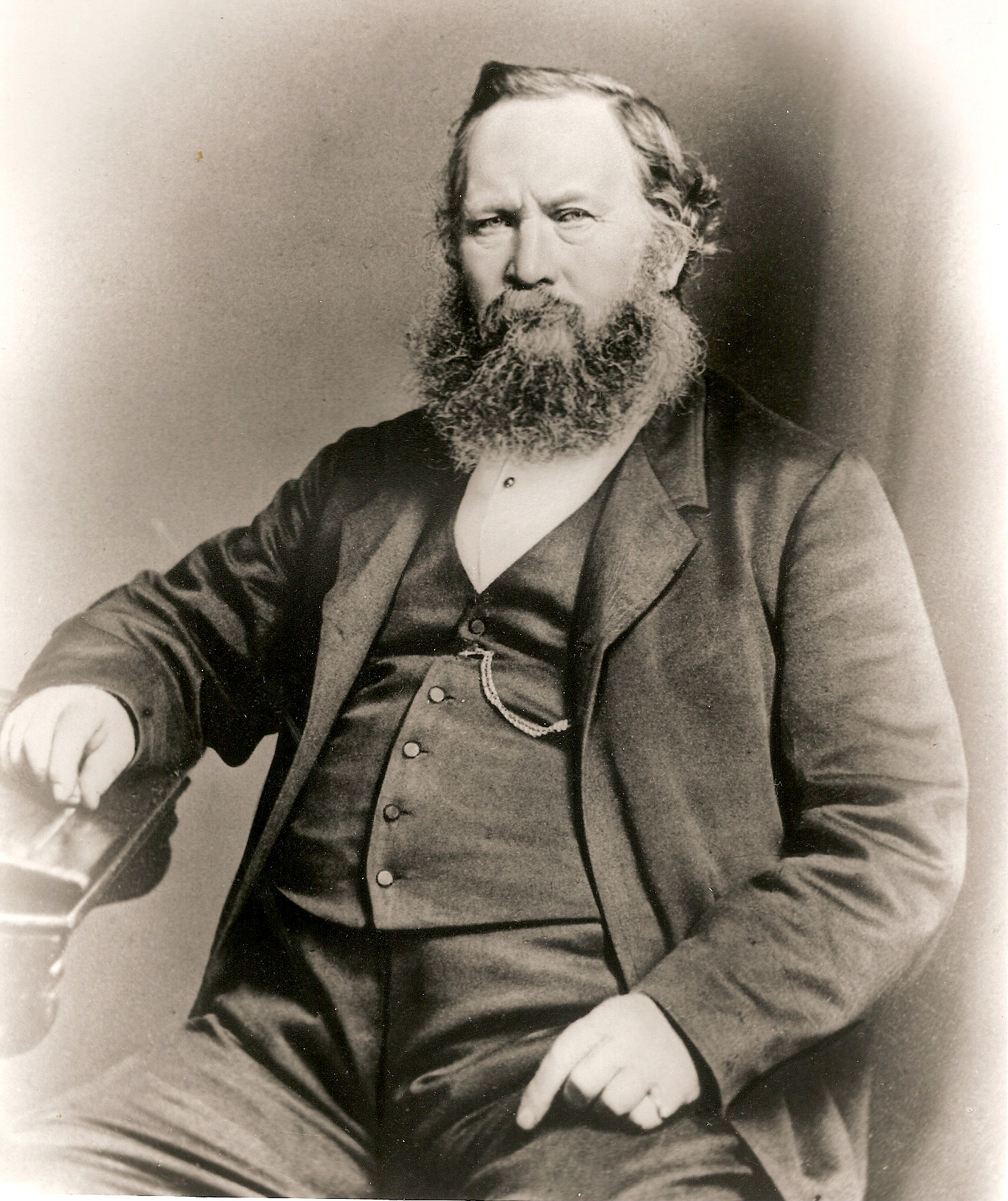
John Smith founder of Smithfield Township

In 1853 Smith again added to his land with the purchase of section 3165. This new section was surveyed and subdivided in 1854 for his new township which he called Smithfield. The site of Township was on land adjacent to were the main road north intersected with a freshwater course now known as Smith Creek. (or Grant Creek). Smith built a homestead on his property in 1850 and set up part of it as a hotel to take advantage of traffic passing by on the main road. Smith planned a town and by 1853 section 3165 of the Hundred of Munno Para was surveyed and subdivided into town allotments. He donated land in 1855 to build the Presbyterian church in the centre of the Township on Augusta Square. Smith commenced construction of his Public House in early 1855 from specifications and plans held by Daniel Garlick from Uley, Gawler Hills (now Uleybury).

By the 1880s, the township had a Church, Public House Hotel (1855), railway station (1857), telegraph station (1859), school (1877), institute building (1883), a store and several other service providers including Joseph Blake senior who established a Blacksmith, Coach building and Undertaker businesses on the lot adjacent to Smith's hotel. Gawler Plains post office had opened on 12 July 1850 and was renamed Smithfield in 1855.

=== Smithfield Recreation Park ===
A committee under the leadership of Joseph Blake junior was formed to established the Smithfield Recreation Park. The site chosen was on the corner of Main North Road and Anderson Walk which was approximately 12 acres and was purchased by a Trust which was established with Henry Joseph Twelftree, Frank Thomas Judd, William Kelly Adams, Melville Galbraith Smith and Joseph Blake as the Trustees. The sum of £140 was raised by subscriptions, and the balance was supplemented by a sports and fete, which was duly held on Saturday, April 19, 1923. The effort resulted in a return of £145, which after paying the outstanding liabilities, left a balance of £80 to be expended on improvements.

On 10 September 1974 the land was transferred by the Trustees to the District Council of Munno Para which merged with the City of Elizabeth to form the City of Playford in 1997.

Smithfield Sports & Social Club is the current tenant and the oval is used by the Smithfield Cricket and Smithfield Football Clubs.

=== Smithfield Speedway ===
A 1 mile (1.6 km) speedway track was built in the Smithfield area in 1926 by the Motorcycle Club of South Australia. The exact location may have been in what is now Elizabeth Downs. The Smithfield Speedway was believed to be the first in the world to be promoted by a motorcycle club. The first meeting was scheduled for Wednesday 13 October 1926, but postponed to Saturday 16 October due to poor weather. The first race meeting was held before the grandstands were built, and the new track generated a lot of dust. The track was on the east side of the Gawler Road, a little south of Smithfield township, in a paddock of 80 acres (32 ha). It appears to have only operated until about 1930.

== World War 2 ==
During the Second World war, the government built some munitions/ordinance factory and storage facility here. Parts of it were demolished in later years.

=== Migrant Hostel ===
Following World War II, a migrant hostel was established on land no longer required for a munitions depot near the railway line at Smithfield. It was operated by the Commonwealth Government from 1949 until 1971 on the land between the railway line and Coventry Road. Single people were allocated space in a dormitory, families had a section of a larger building with two or three bedrooms and a sitting room. Cooking and eating was in a communal dining hall, and there were shared ablution blocks. It had accommodation for 100 people at the end of January 1949, and housed up to 300 people at a time. There was no charge to live in the hostel until the breadwinner of the family found a job. After that, the family was charged a rate proportional to their income for up to a year while they found a permanent home. The hostel was initially a "camp for Balts", housing displaced people from Europe. By 1951, it was also home to British migrants. The Girl Guides operated in the hostel.

== Transport ==
Smithfield railway station on the Gawler railway line was originally built with a station building and opened in June 1857. The original station building on the eastern platform was demolished in 1987 and has been replaced by shelters which have been incorporated into the Bus Interchange.

Trains to and from Adelaide on the Gawler railway line operate from Smithfield station every 15 minutes at peak times on Monday to Friday, and every 30 minutes during off-peak and all day on Saturday and Sunday. In the morning and afternoon/evening peak hours, there are several trains that run express making stops at Smithfield, Elizabeth, Parafield, Salisbury and Mawson Interchanges. These are used by a significant number of passengers who either park their vehicle or transfer from buses at Smithfield Interchange.

Local buses from Smithfield Interchange, scheduled to connect with trains to and from Adelaide, use the Adelaide Metro integrated ticketing system.

== Sport ==
The current Smithfield Football Club was founded in 1965, and joined the Adelaide Footy League in 1995. The club won the division 7 premiership in 2014 and then the division 6 premiership in 2015.

== Notable people ==
- James Umpherston (1812-1900), pioneering farmer at Smithfield for over 12 years from 1847 to 1859 before moving to Mount Gambier. One of the original founding Trustee's of Smithfield Presbyterian Church. Became Member for Electoral district of Victoria (1866-1868) and a noted settler of Mount Gambier, South Australia.
- Hon. Thomas Hogarth MP, (1815-1893) pioneering farmer - Blair Place near Smithfield. Member of South Australian Legislative Council from 1866 until his retirement in 1885.
- Thomas Charles Richmond Baker, DFC, MM & Bar (1897-1918), an Australian soldier, aviator, and flying ace of the First World War was born in Smithfield.
- Maxwell Edgar (Max) Fatchen, AM (1920-2012), Australian children's writer, poet and journalist lived in Jane Street from 1952 for 60 years.

== See also ==
- City of Munno Para
- City of Playford
