= Elizabeth Vale =

- Suburb

- Country: Australia
- State: South Australia
- City: Adelaide
- LGAs: City of Playford; City of Salisbury
- Established: 1955

Government
  - State electorate: Ramsay
  - Federal division: Spence

Population
  - Total: 4,331 (SAL 2021)
- Postcode: 5112
Suburbs around Elizabeth Vale
Edinburgh	Elizabeth	Elizabeth East
Salisbury North	Elizabeth Vale	Hillbank
Salisbury	Salisbury Park	Greenwith

Elizabeth Vale is a suburb in the northern extent of Adelaide, South Australia. It was established in 1955. Its main roads are Main North Road to the east and John Rice Avenue which bisects the suburb. The southern boundary is the northern bank of the Little Para River.

Elizabeth Vale has two hospitals, the Lyell McEwin Hospital, a public teaching hospital, and the private Central Districts Hospital.

== Demographics ==
The 2021 Census by the Australian Bureau of Statistics counted 4,331 persons in the suburb of Elizabeth Vale on census night. Of these, 2,151 (49.7%) were male and 2,176 (50.3%) were female.

The majority of residents 2,355 (54.4%) were Australian born, with 306 (7.1%) born in England.

The age distribution of Elizabeth Vale residents is similar to that of the greater Australian population. 66.1% of residents were aged 25 or over in 2021, compared to the Australian average of 69.8%; and 33.9% were younger than 25 years, compared to the Australian average of 30.1%.

== See also ==
- City of Playford
- List of Adelaide suburbs
