= District Council of Munno Para East =

- Local government area
- Coordinates: 34°42′59″S 138°45′21″E
- Country: Australia
- State: South Australia
- Established: 10 Nov 1853
- Abolished: 6 Nov 1958
- Council seat: Uleybury
LGAs around District Council of Munno Para East
Mudla Wirra (1854-1867); Mudla Wirra South (1867-1933)	Mudla Wirra (1854-1867); Mudla Wirra South (1867-1933)	Gawler (1857-1933); Gawler South (1899-1933)
Munno Para West (1854-1933)	District Council of Munno Para East	Barossa West (1854-1888); Parra Wirra (1854-1933); Barossa (1888-1933)
Yatala (1853-1868); Yatala North (1868-1933)	Highercombe (1853-1933); Tea Tree Gully (1858-1933); Yatala (1853-1868); Yatala North (1868-1933)	Parra Wirra (1854-1933)

The District Council of Munno Para East (pronounced /ˈmʌnoʊ ˈpɑːrə/) was a local government area of South Australia from 1853 to 1958, seated at Uleybury.

== History ==
The District Council of Munno Para East was Proclaimed by Governor Sir Henry Young on 10 November 1853 to govern the eastern half of the cadastral Hundred of Munno Para following a Memorial in September 1853 from 87 owners and occupiers of land in the eastern portion of Munno Para Hundred, praying that that portion of the Hundred lying east of the Great North road, and containing about 50 square miles, be constituted a District; and that James Umpherston, James Adamson, Daniel Garlick, William Kelly, and Phillip Butler be the first District Council.

The first meeting was held on 17 November 1853, There were present Messrs. Umpherstone, Garlick, Kelly, and Butler. Mr. Butler was chosen Chairman. The fortnightly meetings were fixed for the first and third evenings in each month, to be held at the One Tree Hill Inn from which the Township of One Tree Hill took its name.

The combined area of approx. 50 square miles of the Hundred of Munno Para east of the Great North Road (Main North Road) that was bounded on the south by the Little Para River (which derives its name from the Kaurna (Aboriginal language) pari meaning "stream of flowing water") and on the north by the Gawler River/South Para River and was also known as the northern Para Plains. The District Council of Munno Para West was established the following year in 1854 to bring local government to the western half of the Hundred.

== Council expansion ==
On 22 June 1933, the District Council of Munno Para West was abolished, with a severed part added creating an expanded District Council of Munno Para East. The bulk of Munno Para West was merged with Yatala North to create the District Council of Salisbury. A northern severed section from Munno Para West was added to the Town of Gawler.

The first meeting of the expanded District Council of Munno Para East was held at Uley on Monday 3 July 1933. Two Councillors from the abolished District Council of Munno Para West joined the existing Councillors. New Elections will be held in August 1933.

== Council elections ==
The first annual elections of the expanded Munno Para East District Council was held on Saturday 12 August 1933 with the following Councillors elected:—
Gawler Ward - Mr. John James Teller Farrow,
Smithfield Ward - Mr. Lancelot Leslie George Worden,
North Ward - Mr. Albert Henry Riggs,
East Ward - Mr. Henry Hamilton Blackham,
South Ward - Mr. Lachlan Keith McGilp.

The Council Chairman was elected from the Councillors.

Albert Henry Riggs (1873-1948) from Bentley Farm near Gawler was the first Chairman. He served for 22 years and was Chairman for a total of 6 years. His son Eldred Henry Verco Riggs would also become a long term Councillor and Chairman of the Council.

== Council centenary, boundary and name change ==
On Tuesday 17 March 1953 a dinner was held at the Globe Hotel to officially celebrate the proclamation 100 years ago of Munno Para East District Council

In November 1954, a Ward Transfer Agreement by the District Councils of Munno Para East District and Salisbury District Council was reached, with Munno Para East Council agreeable to take over Virginia Ward and portion of Penfield, North Salisbury and St. Kilda Wards from the Salisbury District Council. In exchange, Salisbury would take the section of Munno Para East which is included in the new satellite town plans which would later become Elizabeth.

On 6 November 1958 the Council dropped the "East" from its name to become the District Council of Munno Para which later became the City of Munno Para in 1984.

== Notable residents ==
- Daniel Garlick - Prolific and prominent architect during the establishment and development of the colony of South Australia was Chairman of the District Council of Munno Para East from 1855 to 1860.
- Henry Hamilton Blackham - Irish–Australian writer, poet and pioneer lived at Trevilla, One Tree Hill.

== See also ==
- Hundred of Munno Para
- City of Munno Para
