= Elizabeth, South Australia =

Elizabeth
- Suburb
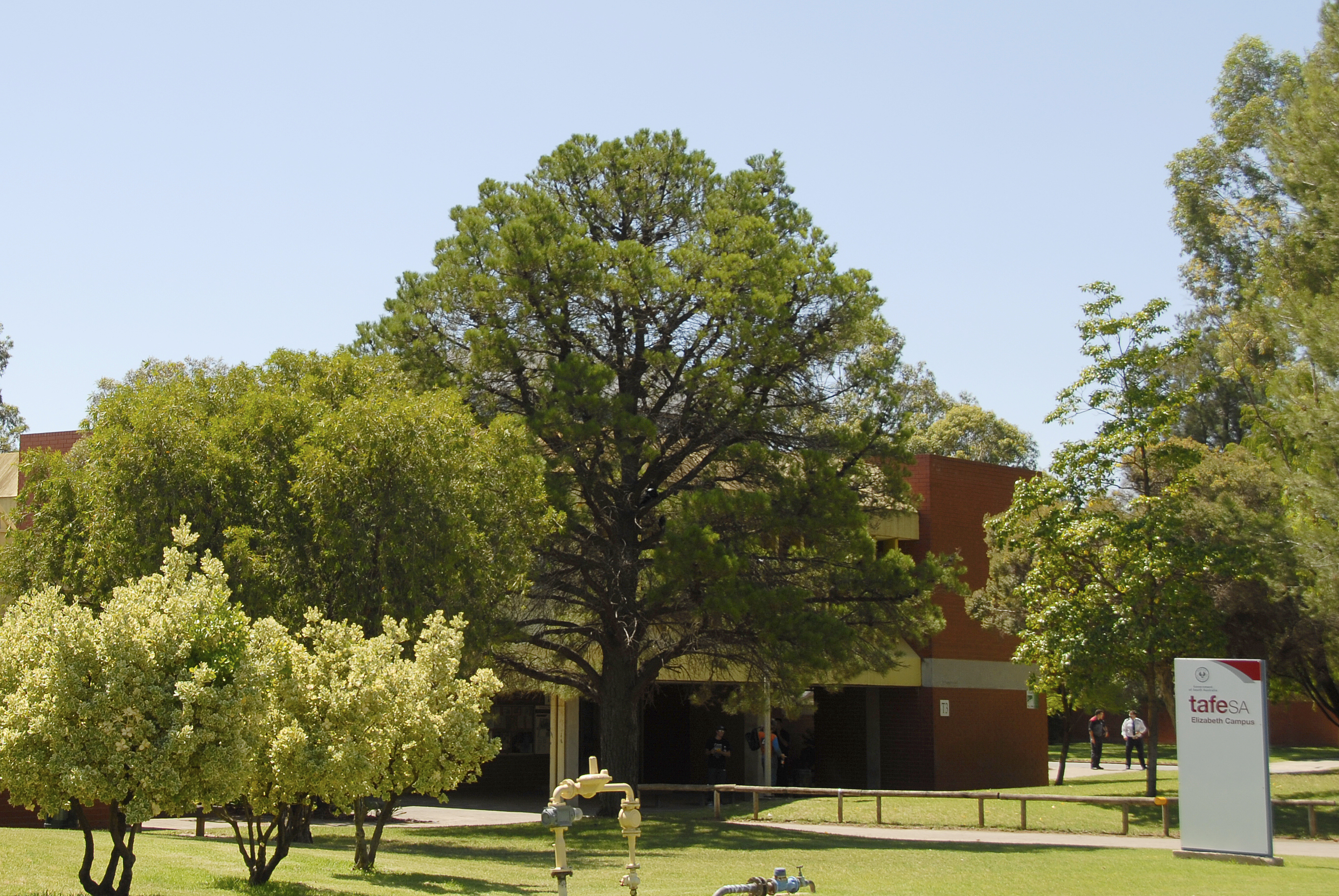
- TAFE SA Elizabeth Campus

- Interactive map of Elizabeth
- Country: Australia
- State: South Australia
- City: Adelaide
- LGA: City of Playford
- Location: 24 km (15 mi) N of Adelaide city centre
- Established: 1955

Government
  - State electorate: Elizabeth
  - Federal division: Spence

Population
  - Total: 1,033 (SAL 2021)
- Postcode: 5112
Suburbs around Elizabeth
Edinburgh North	Elizabeth North	Elizabeth Park
Edinburgh	Elizabeth	Elizabeth East
Elizabeth South	Elizabeth Grove	Elizabeth East

Elizabeth is an outer northern suburb of the Adelaide metropolitan area, South Australia, 24 km north of the Adelaide city centre. It is located in the City of Playford. At the 2021 census, Elizabeth had a population of 1,033.

Established in 1955, it was the seat of the former local government body, the old City of Elizabeth, which included Elizabeth as well as the immediately adjacent suburbs on all sides except the west. Although the City of Elizabeth no longer exists, having been amalgamated into the much larger City of Playford in 1997, the term "Elizabeth", in the context of Adelaide, typically refers to the historic municipality and the distinct community therein.

== History ==
From the early 1850s until the mid 1950s, most of the area surrounding today's suburb of Elizabeth was farming land on which was originally part a wider area known as the Gawler Plains, Hundred of Munno Para. Crown Land was sold, following being advertised in the Government Gazette, at Public Auctions held at the Court House, Adelaide.

An early principal land owner in the area was the Judd Family. Their stone homestead, built in the late 1920s, which is listed on the State Heritage Register still stands and is located on Judd Road, Elizabeth.

After the end of the Second World War with its shortage of materials, the state government decided that South Australia needed to grow and become industrialised. In 1950 a satellite city was planned for northern metropolitan fringe of Adelaide between the existing townships of Salisbury and Smithfield. An earlier proposal was that it be called Munno Para. The District Council of Munno Para East, in whose district a large part of the new town would be, had officially suggested the name because of its long association with the area.

The South Australian Housing Trust initiated a housing development program in the area, with a purchase of 1,200 hectares (3,000 acres) at the site of the present suburb.

The township (now suburb) of Elizabeth was established on 16 November 1955, being named after Queen Elizabeth II, queen of Australia, and inaugurated by Sir Thomas Playford, who was then premier of South Australia.

The town council was briefly renamed the District Council of Salisbury and Elizabeth on 22 August 1963. On 13 February 1964, a new local government body, the municipality of Elizabeth, later called the City of Elizabeth, was created by severance from the District Council of Salisbury.

== Geography ==
Elizabeth is the seat of the Playford local government area and thus acts as a central business district for the surrounding suburbs. It lies mostly between the Gawler railway line and the hills' face. DST Edinburgh is located to the west of Elizabeth.

== Demographics ==
The 2021 Australian census by the Australian Bureau of Statistics counted 40,343 persons in the suburb of Elizabeth on census night. Of these, 20,017 (49.6%) were male and 20,323 (50.4%) were female.

The majority of residents 28,574 (70.8%) were born in Australia, while 2,895 (7.2%) were born in England.

The median age of Elizabeth residents was 35. Children aged 0–14 years made up 22.1% of the population and people aged 65 years and over made up 13.9% of the population.

Afghanistan was third as place of birth and parents' birth after Australia and England, overtaking Scotland, and Hazaraghi was the language next most frequently spoken at home after English.

== Facilities and attractions ==
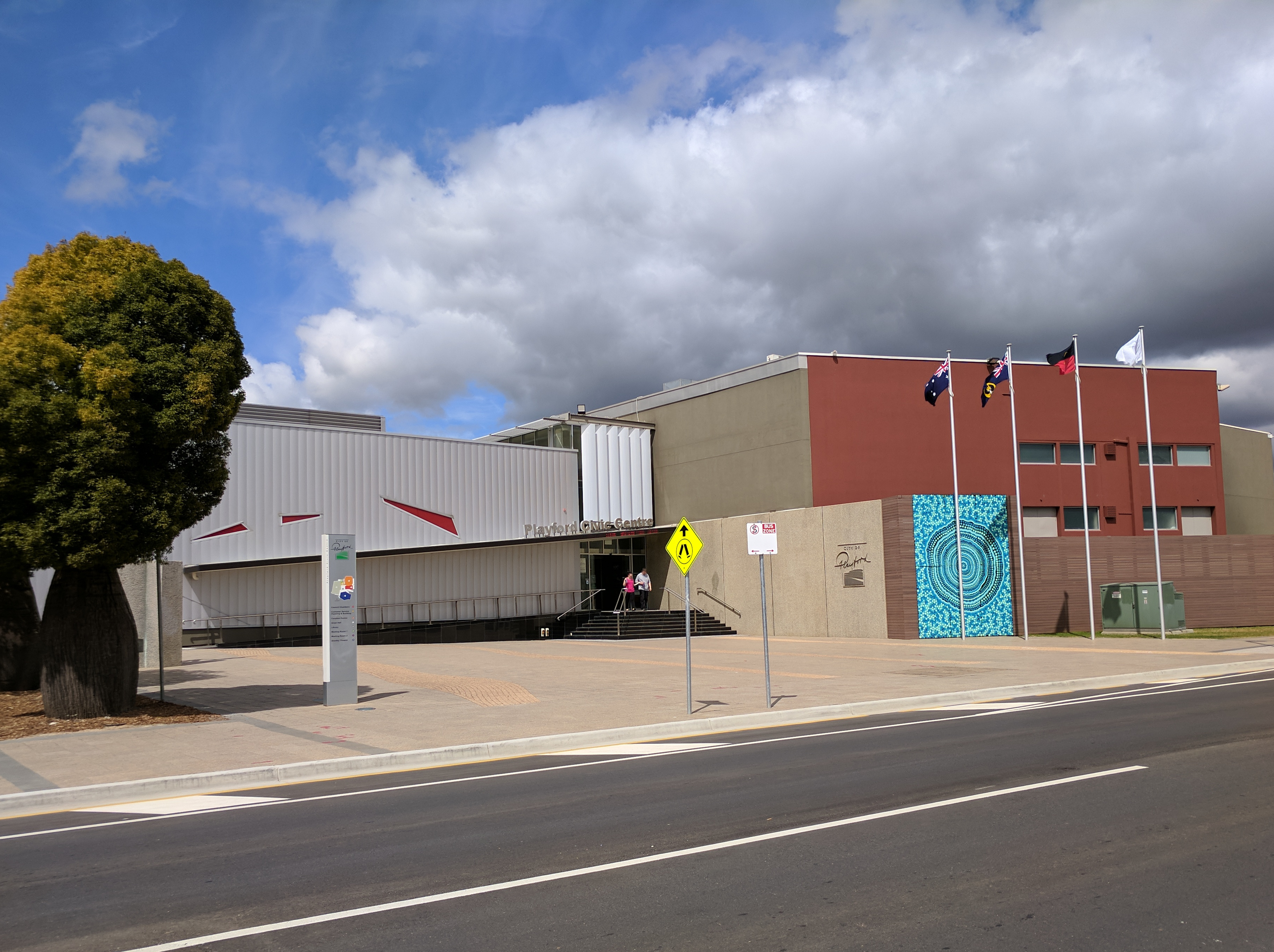
City of Playford civic centre, Elizabeth, in 2017

The City of Playford civic centre houses the council chambers, the Elizabeth branch of the Playford Library and the Shedley Theatre.

Westerly adjacent to the civic centre is the Elizabeth Shopping Centre at the heart of the suburb. Formerly known as Elizabeth Town Centre, it has been progressively expanded since the 1960s. In its early days it featured open-air malls, but today it comprises a single storey undercover mall. A major renovation and extension was completed in 2004.

In 2007, Northern Sound System was established at 71 Elizabeth Way. The centre has offered programs, courses and workshops in various skills, including DJ, hip hop music, youth choir, gaming and animation; songwriting and music production, and it also includes recording studios, a live music venue, and rehearsal spaces.

=== Parks ===
Dauntsey Reserve is located between Winterslow Road and Woodford Road. Ridley Reserve is located on the suburb's southern boundary. There are other parks and reserves in the suburb.

=== Schools ===
Playford International College (formerly Fremont-Elizabeth City High School) is on Philip Highway. Kaurna Plains School is on Ridley Road.

=== Sport ===
Elizabeth is the home of the Central District Bulldogs, an Australian rules football club in the South Australian National Football League (SANFL). The club competed in 12 consecutive League Grand Finals from 2000 to 2011, winning nine premierships. They play all of their home games at Elizabeth Oval ("X Convenience Oval" under naming rights).

== Industry ==
In June 1980 the State Transport Authority opened a bus depot on the corner of Hewittson and Ridgeway roads.

== Transport ==
=== Roads ===
Elizabeth is serviced by Main North Road, connecting the suburb to the Adelaide city centre, and by Philip Highway.

=== Public transport ===
Elizabeth is serviced by public transport run by the Adelaide Metro, including buses and the Gawler railway line which passes beside the suburb. Mountbatten Square houses Elizabeth station, which also acts as a major bus interchange for the region.

== Media ==
The local newspaper was the now-closed News Review Messenger. The Bunyip newspaper also covers the Elizabeth area in its Playford Times section.

== In popular culture ==
- Emotion Is Dead 2023 skateboarding film

== See also ==
- List of Adelaide suburbs
