= Salisbury smart cities controversy =

Political controversy relating to smart city proposal

Since 2020, the City of Salisbury, in the northern Adelaide suburbs of South Australia, has developed a smart cities initiative called Digital Salisbury 2027. The proposal of the initiative received community protests and became associated with a broad range of conspiracy theories about mass surveillance, digital identities, New World Order, artificial intelligence and COVID lockdowns. Two councillors who were involved in the conspiracy theories and protests were later removed from the council for breaches of the Local Government Act 1999 (SA). They have appealed the decision to the Supreme Court of South Australia.

== Background ==
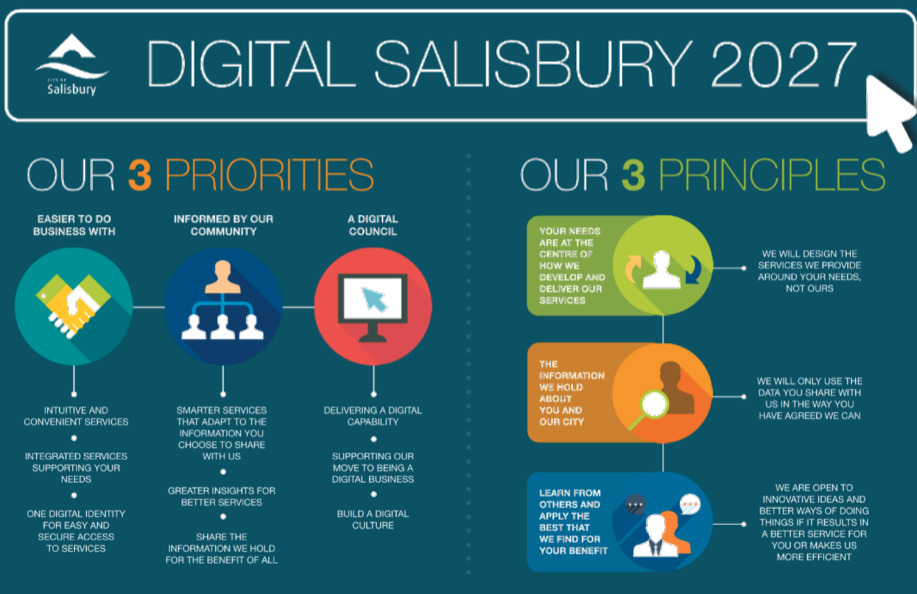
Excerpt of Digital Salisbury 2027 infographic

There is no universal definition of what 'smart cities' are, but the concept generally involves using technologies such as sensors, cameras and IoT devices to improve the automation of infrastructure and data driven decision making by local governments. The concept was first introduced by International Business Machines Corporation in the late 1990s.

=== Government support of smart cities ===
In 2016, the Australian Federal Government established a $50m grants program to support smart technology, using data in decision making and people-focused design for economic, social and environmental reasons. In the first round of the program, the City of Darwin received $5m in funding for a Smart Technology Project. In the second round of the program, The City of Marion received funding to build a $1.7m "smart precinct" at Oaklands Park.

In 2018, the Local Government Association of South Australia and the City of Adelaide established a 'Smart Cities Summit' to support local governments to utilise technology, including a newly established 10 gigabit data network installed around Adelaide.

=== Smart cities framework ===
In 2019, the Local Government Association of South Australia established a smart cities framework to support councils to use technology in urban planning and facilities management. Examples included using technology to identify vacant car spaces or road congestion points, and developing apps for residents to report infrastructure issues such as potholes. The intention of the framework was to increase the efficiency and effectiveness of council services, improve community wellbeing and enable lower taxes. The proclaimed view of the framework was that:

By "going smart", cities and communities are on the fast track to greater resilience, sustainability, and competitive advantage

The framework included a principle to manage people's fears about the responsible management of data.

=== Public discussions about smart cities ===
In June 2022, South Australian Liberal Senator Alex Antic raised broad concerns about Australia's digital future being a surveillance and privacy risk, including that sensitive biometric data could be a target for hackers and malicious foreign agents. In December 2022, Antic released a video about the smart cities programs as being a "rise of the digital surveillance state" with concerns that it represented a dystopian future, and claiming "your city is tracking you".

=== 2022 Local council elections ===
The South Australian local elections were held in November 2022. In election campaign materials, Cr Alan Graham stated that he supported CCTV to target hoon and illegal dumping and Cr Beau Brug stated that he supported CCTV cameras to tackle crime, hoon driving and illegal dumping.

Following the election to Salisbury Council, according to the City of Salisbury 'Salisbury Aware' seasonal magazine, Deputy Mayor Cr Chad Buchanan stated that he was "passionate about establishing a portable CCTV program to help prevent incidences of anti-social behavior including hoon driving, graffiti and illegal dumping at certain hot spots" and Cr Peter Jensen stated that he would work to deliver "a portable CCTV program to tackle hoons and illegal dumping". Cr David Hood stated his support CCTV to "tackle hoons".

Gillian Aldridge was re-elected as Mayor for a fifth term, and seven new councillors were elected including Cr Grace Bawden, Cr Severina Burner and Cr Sharon McKell. Cr Bawden was a former opera singer who appeared in the 2008 season of Australia's Got Talent. During the election, she had been subject of a complaint that her election photo was six years old, despite the Local Government Act requiring photographs to have been taken within the last year. Cr Bawden's mother, Matilda Bawden - who ran unsuccessfully in the election, and had been banned from providing all health advice after spreading false claims about the effectiveness of COVID-19 vaccines - said she submitted the photo on her daughter's behalf. She claimed that Grace Bawden had received "vile and derogatory" comments and abuse for the photo.

== Proposal ==
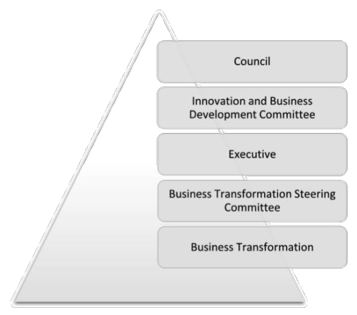
Digital Salisbury 2027 Framework

In June 2020, Salisbury Council developed its City Plan 2035, which included an action to "Develop a digital strategy and framework to implement technology-based initiatives to improve the management of the City".

In September 2020, Salisbury Council began work on a digital strategy called Smart Salisbury. An implementation plan for the strategy was presented to council Resources and Governance Committee on 21 September 2020. The strategy was later renamed to Digital Salisbury 2027, and was intended to improve the quality of life of residents, including increased safety.

In July 2022, the Digital Salisbury 2027 strategy was presented to the Salisbury Innovation and Business Development Committee, consisting of:

1. A "strategy on a page" infographic
2. A single-page digital strategy framework

The Digital Salisbury 2027 infographic highlighted three priorities and three principles. Each priority had multiple goals, which included for residents to able to access most of City of Salisbury services digitally by 2027, and for residents to be able to use one digital identity to access all government services.

The Salisbury smart city proposal also included CCTV cameras to address "hoon" drivers, illegal dumping, and protect residents, and technology to detect movements of cars and people to understand needs for services. Salisbury Council stated that the CCTV system would not use facial recognition technology.

The proposal was supported by newly elected Councillor Sharon McKell, who was elected on a platform that included increasing security in public spaces. In 2005, McKnell's daughter was taken from northern suburbs of Adelaide and murdered, before being dumped at Mount Crawford Forrest and set on fire. A $200,000 reward was offered for information leading to an arrest, but it remains a cold case. McKell was a strong advocate of the Salisbury smart cities proposal, stating that increased CCTV could improve public safety and prevent similar crimes.

== Initial criticism and concerns ==
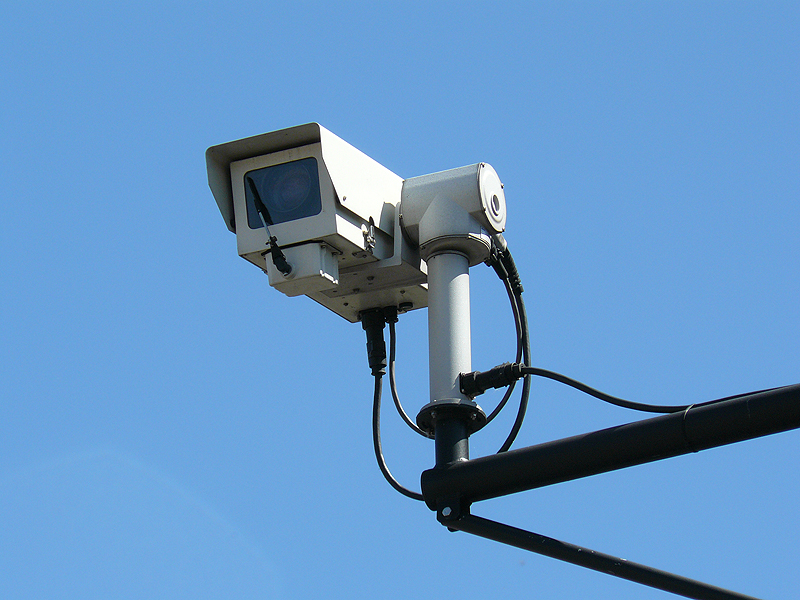
A CCTV camera

On 1 January 2023, Salisbury councillor Severina Burner compared the Salisbury smart cities program to a "concentration camp with pretty interactive lights".

A group of residents called the “No Smart Cities Action Group" (NOSCAG) distributed tens of thousands of pamphlets to Salisbury residents describing it as "purchase, installation and maintenance of prison technologies on the City of Salisbury Streets" and as "big brother technologies". One pamphlet included an image of South Australian Liberal Senator Alex Antic - who had previously criticised smart city initiatives - although he denied any involvement with the flyers and asked for references of him to be removed. The group claimed that 'SMART' is an acronym for Self-Monitoring, Analysis and Reporting Technology, which is a hardware monitoring tool to detect signs of hard drive failures. Salisbury councilor Grace Bawden said she was not a member of NOSCAG but she agreed with its views, and stated that as long as there is capability for facial recognition, it could be used at any time.

Salisbury Business Association Executive Officer, David Waylen, provided support to council's motion to re-affirm commitments to smart city technology. This support was based on the "many positives" that he said smart city technology could provide for businesses, property owners and Salisbury community.

Cr Burner sent an email to her fellow councilors purporting that the technologies enabled citizens to be tracked, traced, monitored, and recorded "constantly and indefinitely", and highlighting information security risks. She listed concerns that the smart city implementation would include LED lights with strobe capabilities, light poles with drone docking stations, sensors in furniture, cameras with facial recognition, microphones with voice recognition, computers and other devices which would steal telephone data of everyone with a mobile phone, and "much much more". She claimed that all the information would be linked to digital ID's, and that the council were acting as the "foot soldiers" on behalf of powerful globalist bankers who had infiltrated the local government sector.

On 22 January, according to a report by Norman Waterhouse Lawyers, Cr Bawden published a post on Facebook stating that smart cities are designed to "concentrate power over people into the hands of a tiny, influential (usually corrupt) group of powerful elites" and stating that smart cities "embrace such concepts as: Net Zero, Geofencing, Geoengineering, Climate Lockdowns, Fourth Industrial Revolution, Decarbonisation, Cashless Society, Central Bank Digital Currency, Basic Income, Social Credit Score, Wealth Redistribution/ Restitution, Transhumanism & much, much more."

The NOSCAG website called for a "massive presence" at the upcoming Council meeting and claimed to planning a distribution of flyers to 57,172 residents. Mayor Gillian Aldridge and Deputy Mayor Chad Buchanan criticised Cr Severina Burner and Cr Grace Bawden for encouraging the protests. Cr Bawden shared information from NOSCAG on social media, asking people to "share & support the Councillors who are fighting for your rights". Mayor Aldridge stated that she was concerned for the safety of the council due to calls for residents to protest at the council meeting.

Other Salisbury councillors reported concerns that residents were too scared to leave their houses as a result of smart cities conspiracies, including claiming that people genuinely believed that poles in Salisbury's main street, John Street, had been fitted with 5g technology to "kill and maim" people. The urban planning concept of 15-minute cities was misinterpreted by protesters as a way to restrict people within their suburb. Deputy mayor, Chad Buchanan was labelled a "lizard man".

== Council meeting to discuss the proposal ==
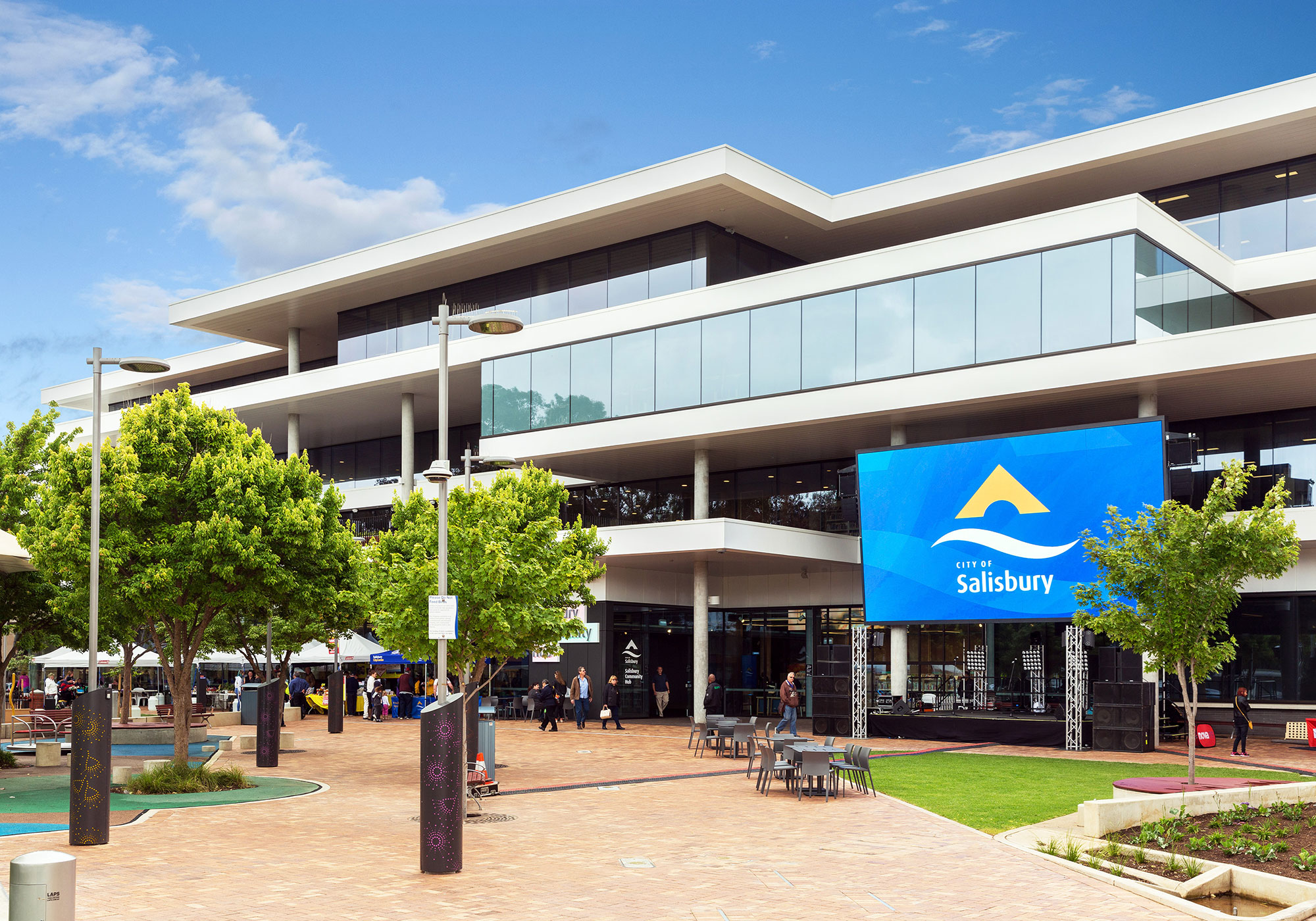
Council chambers inside the Salisbury Community Hub

Discussions on the proposal were scheduled for the 30 January 2023 General Council meeting. There were concerns that protesters might enter the council chamber, which had happened at the southern Adelaide suburban City of Onkaparinga two weeks prior, when protesters stormed the chambers to disrupt discussions about declaring a climate emergency, before being removed by police. Members of that group were affiliated with NOSCAG, and the protestor's actions were described as "justified" by Cr Burner, who had also attended.

About 100 protesters gathered outside the Salisbury Community Hub on the night of the council meeting, but the venue lost power, along with 1,200 other properties, resulting in the meeting being rescheduled to the following day. Cr Peter Jensen thanked the protesters for exercising their democratic rights peacefully and said there was a need to educate the community about the councils proposed use of technology. The protesters were criticised by SA Police for diverting resources from fighting crime, who also stated that they could take civil action to recoup the costs of police responding to "pop up" protests.

On 31 January 2023, the rescheduled meeting was held, with 70 protesters returning to the Salisbury Community Hub, and the council passed a motion that it:

Re-affirms its commitment to providing appropriate smart city technology in the delivery of the Council adopted City Plan and Digital Salisbury [...] such as smart lighting, parking, city navigation, bin collection etc, and that Council does not support the usage of real time facial recognition software technology".

It also requested that the city administration develop a community communications plan to explain the extent and application of smart city technology. The motions were supported by all councillors except Cr Bawden and Cr Burner.

Cr Burner delivered a seven-minute speech reiterating her belief in a number of conspiracies, including outlining details about Elon Musk's brain chips which had been installed into robots. She stated that four of the robots in his factory "went a bit funny" and when the workers were disassembling them, one used its AI technology "to get on the net and find out how to repair itself, and then it killed nine employees". Cr Burner later denied that she made claims about Elon Musk brain chips, stating "no-one has ever made any such claims that Elon Musk 'has inserted or is in the process of inserting &/or attaching to residents' brains [brain chips] to control the community".

At the meeting, the council presented a motion to address a number of concerns, stating for the "avoidance of any doubt" that:

1. The Council will not create a Social Credit Score System,
2. The Council does not use technology "on behalf of powerful Globalist Bankers that have infiltrated all councils for many decades through various UN programs aimed at lobbying Mayors and local government officials",
3. The Council does not support an agenda to create a new One World Government as part of the Great Reset,
4. The Council does not support the rollout of elements within George Orwell's Nineteen Eighty-Four or Animal Farm,
5. Confirming that Smart technology does not introduce digital currencies,
6. The Council does not not allow 5G towers to be used to "kill or maim people",
7. The Council confirms that it is not aware of "a microchip that Elon Musk has produced which he has inserted or is in the process of inserting and/or attaching to residents' brains to control the community",
8. The Council will not create policies to restrict travel through "climate change lockdowns",
9. The Council will not segregate or "geofence" the city to reduce carbon emissions

NOSACS spokesperson, Grant Harrison said some but not all of the claims made by the council motion were believed by NOSAG.

On 7 February 2023, Salisbury Council published an update reiterating its commitment to implementing smart cities technology, and stating that it is "aware of and concerned about misleading information which has recently been circulated". The statement reiterated the intention of CCTV being community safety, and stated:

Council takes the right to privacy of members of the public extremely seriously and respects their freedom within the confines of the law. As a result, Council does not support the use of facial recognition software and this will not be used in relation to any CCTV that is installed by Council.

On 8–9 February 2023, City of Salisbury General Manager of City Infrastructure was a presenter at the Smart Cities Conference in Melbourne, Victoria.

On the 26th of February 2023, Cr Burner and Cr Bawden released a 600 word "forced" apology stating that they were sorry that the council "feels it is justified in regulating anyone's God-given right to free speech in a free & democratic country, by using tactics seen only under dictatorships". They accused the council as labelling them conspiracy theorists. They claimed that the Nazi eugenicists concepts of "useless eaters" and references to human beings as "hackable animals" was being used by the World Economic Forum and United Nations spokespeople.

At a Salisbury Council General Meeting on 27 February 2023, a motion was presented to request that the Mayor and CEO write to Elon Musk "offering the opportunity" to speak to council about the Neuralink chip being developed, and invite him to comment on the public statements made by Cr Burner that the chip had been put into four robots, one of which had allegedly killed nine people. The motion also requested that a video conference option is offered to Musk "in consideration of his availability and the time zone difference". The motion was carried unanimously.

== Subsequent councillor behavioural issues ==
On 25 February 2025, Burner spoke at an Adelaide Freedom Rally outside Parliament House. According to a subsequent behavioural standards panel report, she stated that:

Most councillors are blissfully ignorant about the global political agenda operating above their heads but in plain sight a select few however have been on payrolls for at least a decade ushering in the global fascist utopia which will require you to seek permission to speak, to eat, to travel to work, to even raise a family that's if your family's not dead by then.

Cr Burner was accused of inappropriate behavior by making argumentative and negative verbal comments at a council Public Policy and Planning Committee meeting on 20 March 2023 where she said "make it clear what exactly we're voting on and don't make us look like idiots, make it clear so I don't look like an idiot" before swearing at another council member.

In March 2023 Cr Burner posted a meme of a person contorting their body into a swastika with the caption "Me when I'm asked to kneel and apologise for being white", with the word "right" superimposed on the word "white". She was also criticised for calling council staff and members "kapos" on social media.

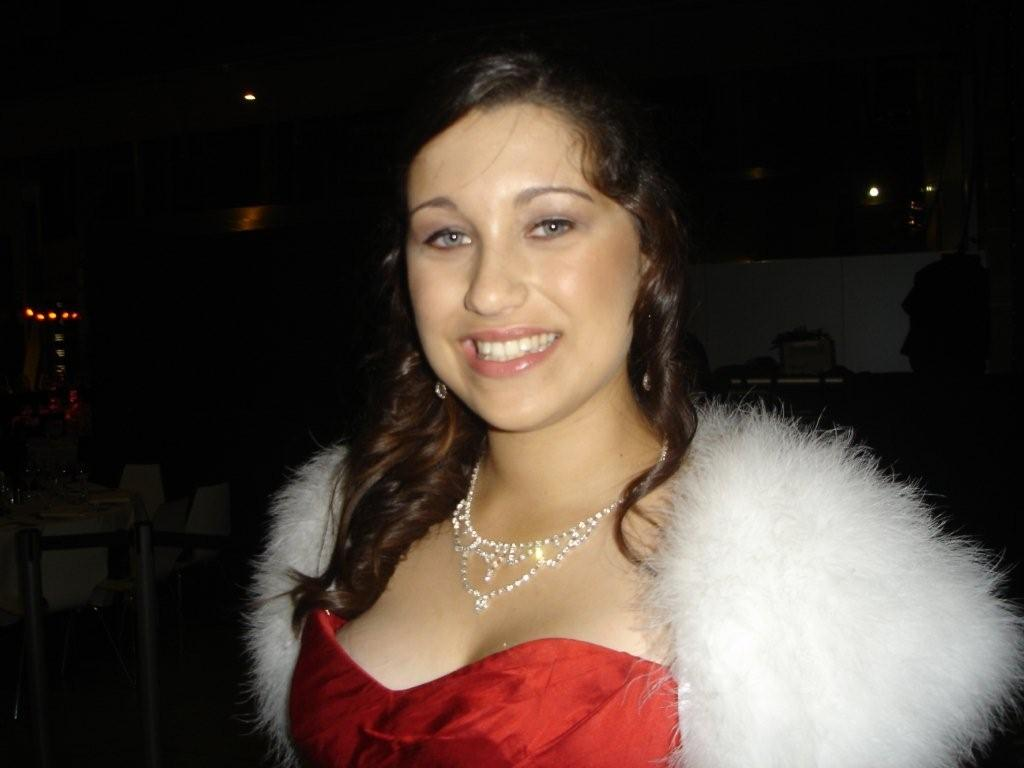
Grace Bawden, who was removed from her role as a councilor in 2023

On 8 March 2023, RMIT FactLab released an assessment of the conspiracy theories that smart city technologies are used to implement digital IDs and track and restrict people's movements, such as 15-minute cities. The report cited the Salisbury smart cities controversy as an example. It concluded that the conspiracy theory was false and that smart city technologies do not use digital IDs to track and restrict people's movements.

In June 2023, Cr Bawden and Cr Burner were removed in a unanimous vote during a special meeting of council for being absent in three consecutive meetings. The decision was appealed by Cr Bawden and Cr Burner in the Supreme Court of South Australia, who claimed that they were denied procedural fairness. The appeal was unsuccessful.
