= Salisbury Downs Primary School =

Government primary school in Adelaide, South Australia

Coordinates: 34.7716°S 138.6235°E

Location
- 39 Paramount Road, Salisbury Downs; South Australia, 5108; Australia

Information
- Type: Government primary school
- Motto: Learning Together
- Established: 1975
- Principal: David Bentley
- Grades: Reception–Year 6
- Enrolment: 271 (2025)
- Website: sdps.sa.edu.au

Salisbury Downs Primary School is a government co-educational primary school located in Salisbury Downs, a northern suburb of Adelaide, South Australia. Situated at 39 Paramount Road within the City of Salisbury, the school provides education from Reception to Year 6.

The school dates its establishment to 1975, with its official opening ceremony taking place on 27 October 1978. It is administered by the South Australian Department for Education.

The school recorded an enrolment of 271 students in Term 3, 2025.

== History ==
=== Establishment and early development ===
The establishment of Salisbury Downs Primary School followed residential development in Adelaide's northern suburbs during the 1960s and 1970s.

Plans for the school were considered by the South Australian Parliament as early as 1972, when a parliamentary report concerning Salisbury Downs Primary School was tabled.

Although government records identify the school's commencement as 1975, Salisbury Downs R–6 School was formally opened on 27 October 1978 by Don Hopgood, then South Australian Minister of Education.

=== Original motto and school emblem ===
The school's original motto was No Barriers, reflecting an educational philosophy that encouraged students to overcome obstacles to learning, personal growth and achievement.

The original school emblem incorporated an aeroplane, symbolising the breaking of the sound barrier as a metaphor for overcoming limitations and striving towards new achievements.

The aircraft imagery may also have reflected the school's proximity to Parafield Airport, with aircraft operating from the airport regularly visible over the surrounding area.

The school's motto was subsequently changed to Learning Together, which remains its current motto.

=== School organisation during the 1980s ===
In 1984, Salisbury Downs Primary School was among nine South Australian Reception–Year 7 schools considered for restructuring. The school had a projected enrolment of approximately 600 students.

Education historian Lynne Trethewey documented opposition to the proposed separation of junior primary and primary education in her 1997 University of Adelaide doctoral thesis, A History of Age Grading in South Australian Primary Schools, 1875–1990. A parent argued that dividing the school could disrupt transitions between year levels, separate younger and older students, and weaken the sense of community.

=== Establishment and educational context ===
Planning for Salisbury Downs Primary School was underway by 1972, when a report concerning the proposed school was tabled in the South Australian Parliament. The school was formally opened on 27 October 1978 by South Australian Minister of Education Don Hopgood.

The school's establishment coincided with a period of educational reform in South Australia. In 1971, the Committee of Enquiry into Education in South Australia, chaired by Professor Peter Karmel, published Education in South Australia, commonly known as the Karmel Report.

The report advocated greater attention to individual students' educational needs, more flexible approaches to organising student groups and greater professional autonomy for teachers. It also recommended that school buildings accommodate individual learning, small-group activities and larger group instruction.

The committee supported allowing teachers greater freedom to develop curricula and select teaching methods within broader educational objectives, while maintaining oversight of educational standards.

=== Experimental education and open-plan classrooms ===
During its early years, Salisbury Downs Primary School reportedly adopted elements of the progressive educational approaches being introduced across South Australia during the 1970s. The school was officially opened in October 1978, during a period of educational reform influenced by the 1971 Karmel Report, which advocated greater flexibility, individualised learning and innovation in teaching methods.

According to recollections of the school's early years, its teaching facilities incorporated large open-plan learning areas divided by movable partitions, rather than conventional enclosed classrooms. These arrangements were intended to accommodate flexible teaching practices, including collaborative learning and the grouping of students for different educational activities.

The open-plan design reportedly presented challenges in managing noise between adjoining teaching areas. In an unusual attempt to address these difficulties, a former principal arranged for empty cardboard egg cartons to be attached to ceilings throughout the school as a form of acoustic treatment. The cartons became a distinctive feature of the school's interior and reportedly remained in place until at least the late 1990s.

The school's experimental approach to education also reportedly attracted criticism from some parents. According to local recollections, a complaint to the South Australian Education Department about the teaching methods contributed to a shift away from experimental practices towards more traditional instruction, including greater emphasis on repetition, memorisation and rote learning.

The reported changes reflected tensions between progressive and conventional educational approaches during a period of considerable debate about primary school teaching methods in Australia.

=== Specialist education programmes ===
During the 2010–11 financial year, a specialist behavioural and educational support centre opened at Salisbury Downs Primary School as part of a South Australian Government initiative.

The centre provided early intervention support for students in Years 3 to 7, operating a part-time programme two days per week. Students participated in individualised learning plans incorporating literacy, numeracy and social skills development.

=== Building maintenance concerns ===
In 1996, concerns about asbestos roofing at Salisbury Downs Primary School were raised in the Parliament of South Australia. During a House of Assembly debate on 9 July, Mike Rann, then Leader of the Opposition, reported that the school council had requested replacement of the roofing following concerns about asbestos-contaminated dust.

A government response in the 1996 Estimates Committee proceedings indicated that replacement of the asbestos roofing was being considered for inclusion in the 1996–97 programmed maintenance and minor works programme.

== Curriculum and education ==
Salisbury Downs Primary School delivers the Australian Curriculum, including English, mathematics, science, humanities and social sciences, technologies, the arts, health and physical education, and languages.

=== Literacy and numeracy ===
The school places an emphasis on explicit instruction in literacy and numeracy.

Its reading programme uses systematic phonics instruction, with decodable texts introduced during the early stages of reading development. Students subsequently progress to more complex texts as their reading skills develop.

Reading comprehension is taught through structured instruction focusing on vocabulary, fluency, language development and the interpretation of written material. The school uses a gradual release of responsibility model, in which teachers progressively transfer responsibility for learning to students.

=== Music education ===
In March 2025, Salisbury Downs Primary School received an $8,000 grant through the South Australian Government's Music Innovation Fund.

The grant supported Rhythm for All: Expanding Access to Music Education through Percussion, a programme designed to broaden students' opportunities to participate in music education through percussion instruments.

=== Health and wellbeing programmes ===
The school participated in the Malpa Young Doctors programme, supported by AnglicareSA, during 2018–19.

The programme introduced primary school students to health education, including nutrition, hygiene, environmental health, wellbeing and community leadership. Students learned from community members, including Aboriginal Elders, and were encouraged to share their knowledge with families and the broader community.

== Facilities ==
=== Sporting facilities ===
The school has a fenced sports oval incorporating Australian rules football and soccer goals, a cricket pitch and practice nets.

An indoor gymnasium includes a full-sized basketball court, a stage, kitchen facilities and amenities. The building is equipped with heating and cooling, allowing it to be used throughout the year.

=== Playgrounds and gardens ===
The school has two playgrounds, each surrounded by nature gardens. These areas provide opportunities for outdoor learning and activities involving planting, gardening and environmental education.

== School community ==
=== Values and identity ===
Salisbury Downs Primary School's motto is Learning Together. Its six stated values are courage, tolerance, friendliness, persistence, compassion and good manners.

The school serves a culturally diverse community in Adelaide's northern suburbs and incorporates student wellbeing and social development into its educational programmes.

=== School uniform ===
The school's uniform is predominantly navy blue, comprising polo shirts, jumpers or jackets, trousers or shorts, and bucket hats.

Year 6 students have specially designed school tops and jumpers, developed by each graduating cohort.

== See also ==
- Salisbury Downs, South Australia
- Education in South Australia
- List of schools in South Australia
