= Salisbury North, South Australia =

Salisbury North
- Suburb
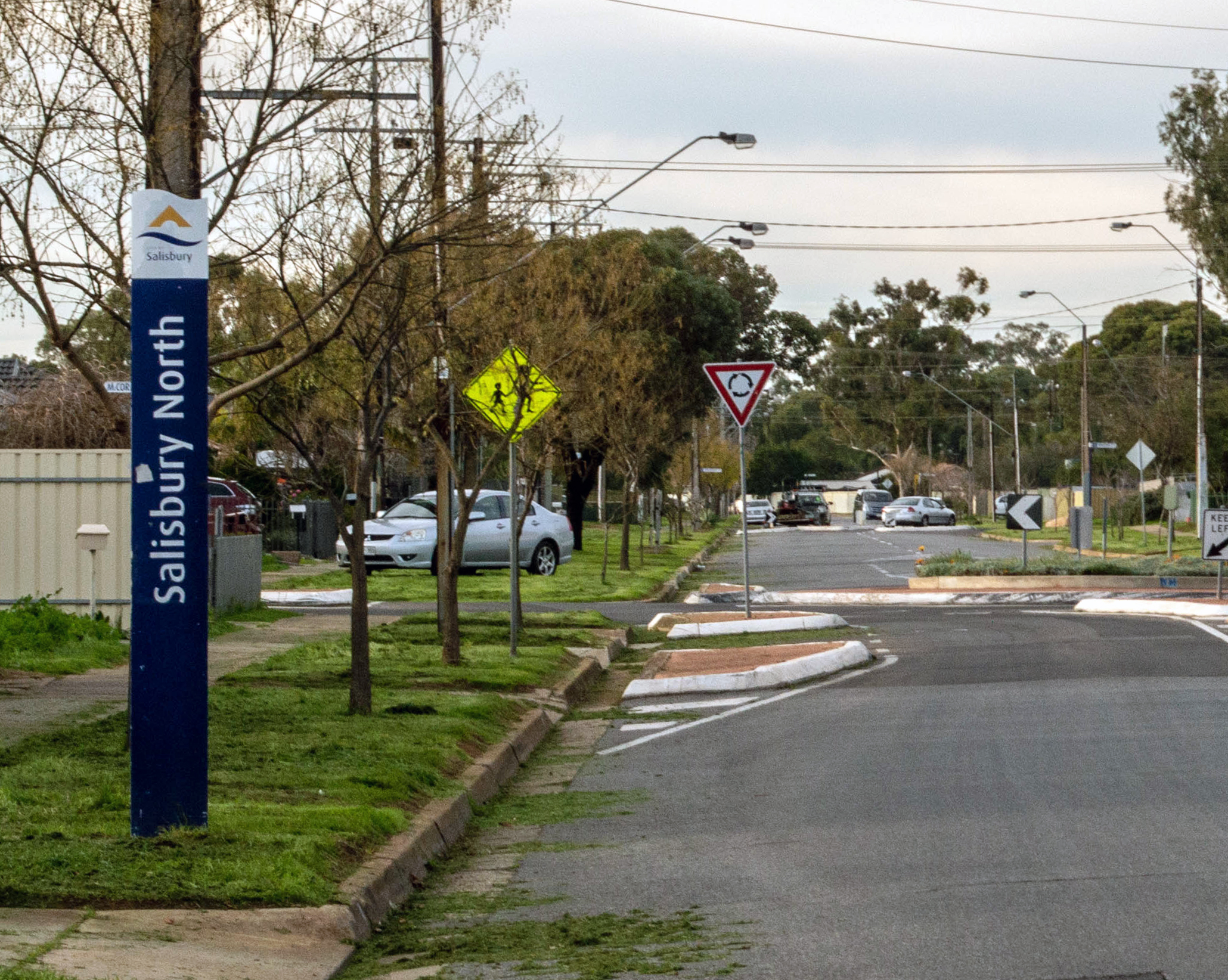
- Whites Road, Salisbury North

- Coordinates: 34.75000°S 138.62243°E
- Country: Australia
- State: South Australia
- City: Adelaide
- LGA: City of Salisbury
- Established: 1949

Government
  - State electorate: Ramsay
  - Federal division: Spence

Population
  - Total: 10,683 (SAL 2021)
- Postcode: 5108
Suburbs around Salisbury North
Direk	Edinburgh
Burton	Salisbury North	Elizabeth South
Paralowie	Salisbury

Salisbury North is a suburb in the City of Salisbury, part of the greater Adelaide conurbation in South Australia. It was built by the South Australian Housing Trust on a greenfield site in the early 1950s, mainly to house employees of the nearby Long Range Weapons Establishment. It is bounded on the north by the Adelaide–Port Augusta railway line; on the east by the Gawler railway line; on the south by the Little Para River and Waterloo Corner Road; and on the west by Bolivar Road.

== Establishment of the housing estate ==
In 1947 the Commonwealth Government established the Long Range Weapons Establishment (LRWE) in partnership with the United Kingdom Government as a facility for research and development of rocket-propelled weapons. The support base for the rocket range at Woomera was at Penfield (34°44′31″S 138°38′10″E), on the northern side of the Adelaide-Port Augusta railway line, where a large munitions manufacturing complex had been built in 1941, 3 kilometres (1.9 mi) from the small rural centre of Salisbury.

As with the munitions complex at the beginning of the war, in 1949 the location that was to become known as Salisbury North, immediately to its south, was no more than wheat paddocks on a flat alluvial plain. Through the paddocks ran Waterloo Corner Road, the main road leading north-west from Salisbury to Port Wakefield. The whole area was lightly populated, having a population of only 4,159 within the boundaries of the 200 square kilometres (77 sq mi) Salisbury District Council, including Salisbury itself.

During the war years, many hundreds of workers had been conveyed each day by train to and from Penfield since most of the workforce lived in Adelaide. There had been a post-war lull when munitions manufacture ceased, but as the new Anglo–Australian weapons project established in 1947 gathered pace, the need to recruit large numbers of employees increased. However, the post-war labour market in Adelaide was buoyant and the price of housing high. Every kind of worker was in short supply, and the project had to compete with electronics and engineering firms that were tooling up and taking on staff to meet the heavy demand for consumer goods. Working for the Commonwealth Government had its advantages – the pay was higher than private employers were offering – but unless one could find somewhere to live locally, working at Penfield involved a commuting trip from the city. From the beginning the authorities recognised that recruitment of staff demanded inducements, and the most potent inducement at the time was the guarantee of a house.

The Commonwealth Government's solution was to engage the Government of South Australia under the Commonwealth-State Housing Agreement to build a housing estate at Salisbury North explicitly to house the "industrials" (sub-professional employees) of LRWE, on the argument that these grades would be most attracted by the idea of housing close at hand. Starting in 1949, the job was undertaken by the South Australian Housing Trust, the statutory authority responsible for providing low-cost rental housing to working people.

The original concept had been that houses for the LRWE employees would be scattered through a wider community to avoid Salisbury North becoming a ghetto. But these advanced notions did not persist, for the economies inherent in making it an estate development were too great to ignore when both money and housing materials were in short supply. The small, semi-detached "maisonettes" subsequently built at Salisbury North were intended to be permanent and their deficiencies have become a permanent part of the Salisbury urban landscape. Most were built using large blocks of Mount Gambier limestone. A local historian described them as:

low cost structures ... of monotonous form, being identical to each other, endless in their rows, all with a rusting chainwire mesh fence and weathering to that insipid yellow/brown of weathered limestone. Their appearance could be said to be the trademark of any Australian public housing authority of the immediate post-war era. In their architecture a mark of contempt seems to be expressed for the people in residence.

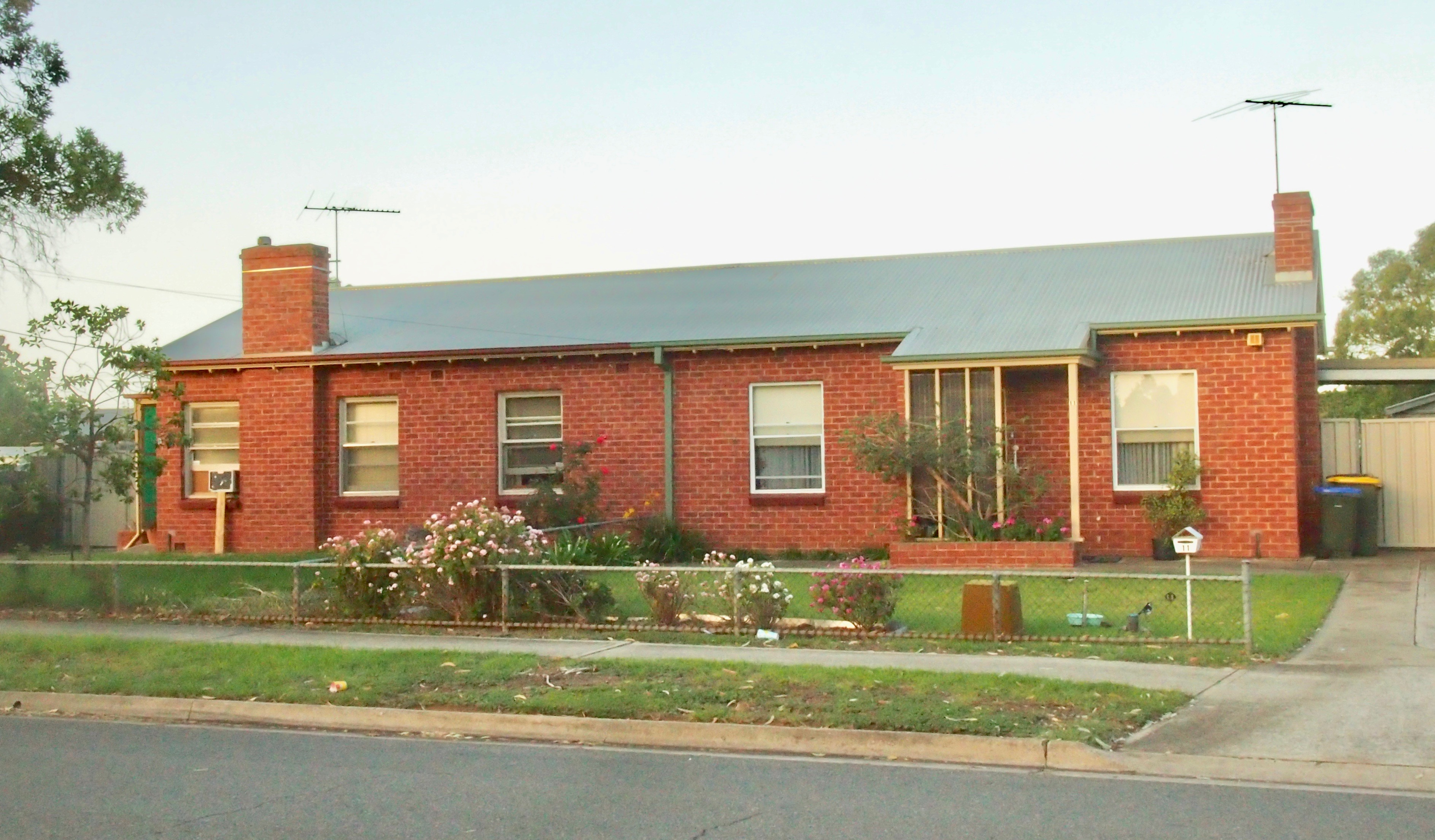
A semi-detached "maisonette" in the Adelaide suburb of Seaton, identical to those built at Salisbury North by the South Australian Housing Trust.

The slovenliness of the domestic architecture was matched by the absence of even a rudimentary attempt at town planning. The powers of the Housing Trust were limited at the time merely to putting up houses: it could not build shops or roads or footpaths, or community amenities halls, play-grounds or parks. No public telephone was installed until the end of 1952. Until 1955 the estate was not even sewered; before April 1953, when nearly 300 families were living there, tenants were instructed to bury sewage themselves in their backyards. Since the area is low lying and prone to flooding, the unmade roads could be quagmires in winter. Bagster's Road, the main thoroughfare to LRWE, was a mud track. Employees used to come to work in heavy gum boots, walking because the road was impassable to vehicles.

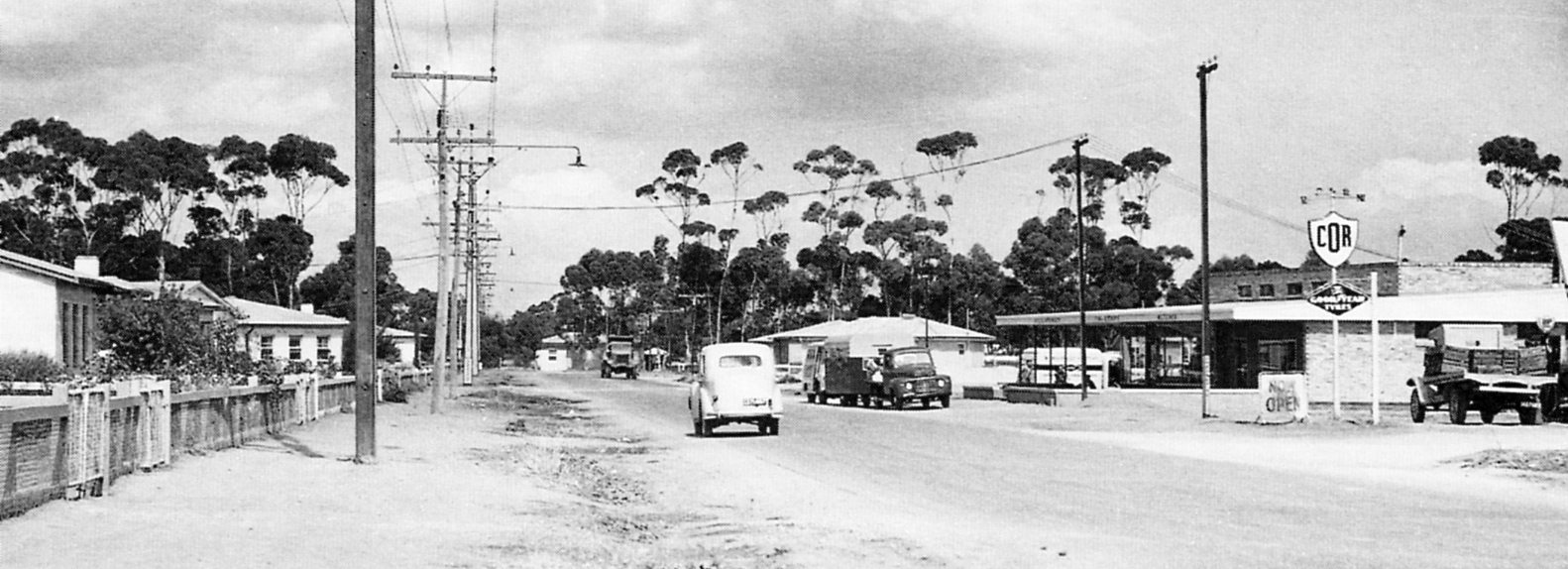
Bagster's Road in 1956, seven years after it was laid out. As an important road leading to the estate's sole shops and service station it had been bituminised, but there was no kerbing and storm-water drainage was a ditch.

== Later events ==
The proportion of LRWE employees living at Salisbury North was very high for years after it was established. In 1951 three-quarters of the houses were allocated as soon as they were finished to families nominated by LRWE and contractor companies. The other quarter went to staff of the state education and police departments and to needy families in the area. In September 1955 a report to the General Manager of the Housing Trust calculated that, out of the initial allocation of 1000 houses, 850 were now home to employees of LRWE and its associated industries. At first the estate's social mix was wider than had been envisaged. With the absence of anything better to go to, every class rubbed shoulders there, from the men of the Commonwealth Investigation Service to graduate Experimental Officers to toolmakers. But eventually many employees tired of the conditions and went to live in better housing far from the estate.

In 1959, Salisbury High School was built on a picturesque riverside site between the estate and the town of Salisbury. Before then most secondary students had gone to Enfield High School, 15 kilometres (9.3 mi) away.

In the 1980s, the South Australian Housing Trust started to offer houses for sale to their tenants. Since then many of the original houses have been extended, and in some cases rebuilt, made practicable by the low real estate market.

Salisbury North's reputation was adversely affected when it was revealed in 1999 that the leader of a group of four serial killers, John Bunting, had lived for several years in a rented house in Waterloo Corner Road. He and his gang members had murdered and buried two of the victims in the backyard before eventually storing the bodies with others in a former bank at Snowtown. The house was demolished in 1999.

Expansion of the Adelaide conurbation has resulted in Salisbury North now being part of the capital's continuous northern suburbs, no longer a single-purpose estate bounded by farmland.
