= Electoral results for the Division of Makin =

Australian division election results

This is a list of electoral results for the Division of Makin in Australian federal elections from the division's creation in 1984 until the present.

== Members ==
Member	Party	Term
Peter Duncan	Labor	1984–1996
Trish Draper	Liberal	1996–2007
Tony Zappia	Labor	2007–present

== Election results ==
=== Elections in the 2020s ===
==== 2025 ====
2025 Australian federal election: Makin
Party	Candidate	Votes	%	±%
Animal Justice	Geoff Russell			
Greens	Samuel Moore			
Family First	Sue Nancarrow			
Trumpet of Patriots	Mark Aldridge			
One Nation	Alison Dew-Fennell			
Fusion	Amelie Hanna			
Liberal	Irena Zagladov			
Labor	Tony Zappia			
Total formal votes				
Informal votes				
Turnout				

==== 2022 ====
2022 Australian federal election: Makin
Party	Candidate	Votes	%	±%
Labor	Tony Zappia	49,843	46.30	−2.12
Liberal	Alan Howard-Jones	33,840	31.44	−1.44
Greens	Emma Mustaca	12,317	11.44	+2.81
One Nation	Rajan Vaid	5,097	4.74	+4.74
United Australia	Kimberley Drozdoff	4,638	4.31	−2.13
Federation	Abram Lazootin	1,907	1.77	+1.77
Total formal votes		107,642	95.87	+0.36
Informal votes		4,639	4.13	−0.36
Turnout		112,281	91.20	−1.92
Two-party-preferred result
Labor	Tony Zappia	65,444	60.80	+1.08
Liberal	Alan Howard-Jones	42,198	39.20	−1.08
Labor hold		Swing	+1.08	

Alluvial diagram for preference flows in the seat of Makin in the 2022 federal election. indicates at what stage the winning candidate had over 50% of the votes and was declared the winner.

=== Elections in the 2010s ===
==== 2019 ====
2019 Australian federal election: Makin
Party	Candidate	Votes	%	±%
Labor	Tony Zappia	51,666	48.42	+5.72
Liberal	Hemant Dave	35,087	32.88	+5.42
Greens	Stephanie Stewart	9,211	8.63	+3.92
United Australia	Rachel Collis	6,874	6.44	+6.44
Animal Justice	Lyn Gaston	3,866	3.62	+2.00
Total formal votes		106,704	95.51	+0.13
Informal votes		5,021	4.49	−0.13
Turnout		111,725	93.12	+1.03
Two-party-preferred result
Labor	Tony Zappia	63,726	59.72	−1.07
Liberal	Hemant Dave	42,978	40.28	+1.07
Labor hold		Swing	−1.07	

==== 2016 ====
2016 Australian federal election: Makin
Party	Candidate	Votes	%	±%
Labor	Tony Zappia	39,358	41.84	−3.72
Liberal	Graham Reynolds	26,847	28.54	−8.66
Xenophon	Craig Bossie	15,614	16.60	+16.60
Greens	Keiran Snape	4,373	4.65	−1.26
Family First	Paul Coombe	4,273	4.54	−1.87
Independent	Mark Aldridge	2,126	2.26	+2.26
Animal Justice	Zarina Greenberg	1,479	1.57	+1.57
Total formal votes		94,070	95.56	+0.44
Informal votes		4,366	4.44	−0.44
Turnout		98,436	91.92	−2.06
Two-party-preferred result
Labor	Tony Zappia	56,116	59.65	+4.59
Liberal	Graham Reynolds	37,954	40.35	−4.59
Labor hold		Swing	+4.59	

==== 2013 ====
2013 Australian federal election: Makin
Party	Candidate	Votes	%	±%
Labor	Tony Zappia	41,873	45.56	−4.70
Liberal	Sue Lawrie	34,192	37.20	+6.75
Family First	Mark Potter	5,891	6.41	+0.40
Greens	Ami Harrison	5,429	5.91	−4.39
Palmer United	Andrew Graham	3,818	4.15	+4.15
Katter's Australian	Robert Jameson	705	0.77	+0.77
Total formal votes		91,908	95.12	+1.13
Informal votes		4,717	4.88	−1.13
Turnout		96,625	93.97	−0.37
Two-party-preferred result
Labor	Tony Zappia	50,604	55.06	−6.94
Liberal	Sue Lawrie	41,304	44.94	+6.94
Labor hold		Swing	−6.94	

==== 2010 ====
2010 Australian federal election: Makin
Party	Candidate	Votes	%	±%
Labor	Tony Zappia	43,114	50.58	−0.87
Liberal	Liz Davies	25,740	30.20	−8.07
Greens	Jasemin Rose	8,604	10.09	+5.79
Family First	Mark Potter	5,089	5.97	+2.42
Liberal Democrats	Michael Gameau	1,081	1.27	+0.78
One Nation	Anton Horvat	662	0.78	+0.20
Democrats	Wayne Rich	534	0.63	−0.74
Climate Sceptics	Robert Stewart	409	0.48	+0.48
Total formal votes		85,233	93.91	−2.02
Informal votes		5,532	6.09	+2.02
Turnout		90,765	94.29	−1.38
Two-party-preferred result
Labor	Tony Zappia	53,014	62.20	+4.50
Liberal	Liz Davies	32,219	37.80	−4.50
Labor hold		Swing	+4.50	

=== Elections in the 2000s ===
==== 2007 ====
2007 Australian federal election: Makin
Party	Candidate	Votes	%	±%
Labor	Tony Zappia	44,890	51.45	+8.43
Liberal	Bob Day	33,390	38.27	−6.44
Greens	Graham Smith	3,751	4.30	+0.51
Family First	Andrew Graham	3,096	3.55	−1.37
Democrats	Aleisha Brown	1,198	1.37	−0.38
One Nation	Robert Fechner	502	0.58	−0.26
Liberty & Democracy	Garry Vandersluis	428	0.49	+0.49
Total formal votes		87,255	95.93	+1.34
Informal votes		3,705	4.07	−1.34
Turnout		90,960	95.81	+0.34
Two-party-preferred result
Labor	Tony Zappia	50,346	57.70	+8.63
Liberal	Bob Day	36,909	42.30	−8.63
Labor gain from Liberal		Swing	+8.63	

==== 2004 ====
2004 Australian federal election: Makin
Party	Candidate	Votes	%	±%
Liberal	Trish Draper	37,912	44.71	−1.01
Labor	Tony Zappia	36,486	43.02	+6.33
Family First	Rob Pillar	4,172	4.92	+4.92
Greens	Jon Moore	3,213	3.79	+1.47
Democrats	Catherine Opitz	1,484	1.75	−8.67
Independent	Jeanie Walker	820	0.97	+0.97
One Nation	Victor Horvat	715	0.84	−3.87
Total formal votes		84,802	94.59	−0.15
Informal votes		4,851	5.41	+0.15
Turnout		89,653	95.47	−0.67
Two-party-preferred result
Liberal	Trish Draper	43,186	50.93	−2.73
Labor	Tony Zappia	41,616	49.07	+2.73
Liberal hold		Swing	−2.73	

==== 2001 ====
2001 Australian federal election: Makin
Party	Candidate	Votes	%	±%
Liberal	Trish Draper	36,979	45.94	+5.35
Labor	Julie Woodman	29,539	36.70	−1.14
Democrats	Christine Posta	8,343	10.37	+0.14
One Nation	Rod Kowald	3,779	4.69	−4.95
Greens	Allon Reeves	1,850	2.30	+2.30
Total formal votes		80,490	94.79	−0.92
Informal votes		4,420	5.21	+0.92
Turnout		84,910	96.68	
Two-party-preferred result
Liberal	Trish Draper	43,271	53.76	+2.98
Labor	Julie Woodman	37,219	46.24	−2.98
Liberal hold		Swing	+2.98	

=== Elections in the 1990s ===
==== 1998 ====
1998 Australian federal election: Makin
Party	Candidate	Votes	%	±%
Liberal	Trish Draper	33,702	40.70	−3.85
Labor	Gail Gago	31,194	37.67	−3.07
Democrats	Christine Posta	8,502	10.27	+1.04
One Nation	Rod Kowald	8,009	9.67	+9.67
Independent	Mike Wohltmann	1,002	1.21	+1.21
Natural Law	Geoffrey Wells	391	0.47	−0.44
Total formal votes		82,800	95.70	+0.70
Informal votes		3,719	4.30	−0.70
Turnout		86,519	96.31	−0.18
Two-party-preferred result
Liberal	Trish Draper	42,180	50.94	−0.14
Labor	Gail Gago	40,620	49.06	+0.14
Liberal hold		Swing	−0.14	

==== 1996 ====
1996 Australian federal election: Makin
Party	Candidate	Votes	%	±%
Liberal	Trish Draper	35,762	44.55	+3.36
Labor	Peter Duncan	32,709	40.75	−6.04
Democrats	Tony Hill	7,404	9.22	+2.11
Greens	Henri Mueller	1,914	2.38	+2.38
Independent	Mary Newcombe	757	0.94	+0.94
Natural Law	Andrew Scott	731	0.91	−0.16
Independent	Tony Baker	726	0.90	+0.90
	Barry Illert	267	0.33	+0.33
Total formal votes		80,270	95.00	−1.36
Informal votes		4,223	5.00	+1.36
Turnout		84,493	96.49	+0.58
Two-party-preferred result
Liberal	Trish Draper	40,840	51.08	+4.79
Labor	Peter Duncan	39,106	48.92	−4.79
Liberal gain from Labor		Swing	+4.79	

==== 1993 ====
1993 Australian federal election: Makin
Party	Candidate	Votes	%	±%
Labor	Peter Duncan	36,748	46.79	+5.49
Liberal	Alan Irving	32,353	41.19	+2.87
Democrats	Angela Smith	5,585	7.11	−8.60
Independent	Eva Dobson	986	1.26	+1.26
Call to Australia	Dorothy Durland	986	1.26	−1.97
Natural Law	Susan Brown	844	1.07	+1.07
Independent	Alf Taylor	745	0.95	+0.95
Independent	Stan Batten	294	0.37	+0.37
Total formal votes		78,541	96.36	+0.14
Informal votes		2,966	3.64	−0.14
Turnout		81,507	95.91	
Two-party-preferred result
Labor	Peter Duncan	42,155	53.70	+0.28
Liberal	Alan Irving	36,339	46.30	−0.28
Labor hold		Swing	+0.28	

==== 1990 ====
1990 Australian federal election: Makin
Party	Candidate	Votes	%	±%
Labor	Peter Duncan	28,529	40.8	−6.5
Liberal	Daryl Hicks	27,462	39.3	−0.1
Democrats	Steve Bartholomew	10,619	15.2	+6.2
Call to Australia	Jeff Penny	2,320	3.3	+3.3
Independent	Geoff Roberts	639	0.9	+0.9
Independent	David Howard	309	0.4	+0.4
Total formal votes		69,878	96.2	
Informal votes		2,775	3.8	
Turnout		72,653	96.8	
Two-party-preferred result
Labor	Peter Duncan	36,573	52.4	−1.0
Liberal	Daryl Hicks	33,197	47.6	+1.0
Labor hold		Swing	−1.0	

=== Elections in the 1980s ===
==== 1987 ====
1987 Australian federal election: Makin
Party	Candidate	Votes	%	±%
Labor	Peter Duncan	29,361	47.3	−0.9
Liberal	Neville Joyce	24,465	39.4	+0.4
Democrats	Sandra Kanck	5,606	9.0	−0.5
National	Natalie Richardson	1,505	2.4	+1.7
Unite Australia	Kenneth Taplin	671	1.1	+1.1
Independent	A. Wunderlich	441	0.7	+0.7
Total formal votes		62,049	93.4	
Informal votes		4,398	6.6	
Turnout		66,447	94.8	
Two-party-preferred result
Labor	Peter Duncan	33,130	53.4	−1.0
Liberal	Neville Joyce	28,904	46.6	+1.0
Labor hold		Swing	−1.0	

==== 1984 ====
1984 Australian federal election: Makin
Party	Candidate	Votes	%	±%
Labor	Peter Duncan	27,282	48.2	−5.8
Liberal	Neville Joyce	22,073	39.0	+2.7
Democrats	Andrew Coventry	5,401	9.5	+0.4
Independent	Bernhard Buechner	1,442	2.5	+2.5
National	John Henderson	412	0.7	+0.7
Total formal votes		56,610	90.3	
Informal votes		6,088	9.7	
Turnout		62,698	94.9	
Two-party-preferred result
Labor	Peter Duncan	30,792	54.4	−4.8
Liberal	Neville Joyce	25,806	45.6	+4.8
Labor notional hold		Swing	−4.8	
