= Direk, South Australia =

Direk
- Suburb
- Coordinates: 34°43′25″S 138°36′34″E
- Country: Australia
- State: South Australia
- City: Adelaide
- LGA: City of Salisbury

Government
  - State electorate: Ramsay
  - Federal division: Spence

Population
  - Total: 913 (SAL 2021)
- Postcode: 5110
Suburbs around Direk
Waterloo Corner	Penfield	Edinburgh
Waterloo Corner	Direk	Salisbury North
Burton	Burton	Salisbury North

Direk (pronounced /daɪˈrɛk/) is a suburb located in the City of Salisbury, Adelaide, South Australia. It is bounded by Heaslip Road, Diment Road, Bolivar Road and the Adelaide-Port Augusta railway line.

Direk is predominantly an industrial suburb, with residential development in the southeast adjoining Salisbury North and Burton residential areas. To the north lies the RAAF Edinburgh base. Direk Primary School is in the much larger suburb of Salisbury North.

== History ==
Originally named after a railway close to Salisbury and a term referring to a wetland in Aboriginal language, the language currently unknown, this suburban area was established in 1966 by C.L. and B.J. Wilkinson, C.L. Bonython, and M.R. Turner.

=== Diment Family History ===
The Diment family played a notable role in Burton, South Australia's educational history. Francis Diment was a teacher at Burton school from 1868 to 1871. He was succeeded by William Diment, who continued from 1871 to 1873. Francis maintained regular attendance and taught various scientific subjects. William continued the educational efforts. Ivy Diment, born in 1890 and later Mrs. F.T.P. Heidenreich, recalled her schooldays at Burton, noting the dedication of teachers like Mr. Lang. The Diment family's contributions extended beyond education, impacting the community significantly.Direk is a suburb in the City of Salisbury.
