= Salisbury Downs, South Australia =

- Country: Australia

Population
  - Total: 6,296 (SAL 2021)

Salisbury Downs is a suburb in the City of Salisbury, in the northern suburbs of Adelaide, South Australia. The suburb is bordered by Kings Road, the Little Para River, Burton Road, Spains Road and the Gawler railway line.

== History ==
The area now known as Salisbury Downs lies on the traditional lands of the Kaurna people, who lived across the Adelaide Plains for thousands of years before European settlement.

European settlement of the district began in 1847, when Scottish immigrant John Harvey bought land along the Little Para River. He began selling allotments for the township of Salisbury the following year. Through the nineteenth century the surrounding land was used mainly for growing oranges, wheat and hay, and for dairying.

The district remained largely rural until 1940, when the federal government built a munitions factory at nearby Penfield. Residential growth followed from the 1950s, and accelerated in the 1960s and 1970s when the South Australian Housing Trust built large numbers of homes in the area, attracting many British migrants. Salisbury Downs was established as a residential subdivision on the western side of Salisbury Highway in 1967. During 1979â€“80, the South Australian Housing Trust planned to complete 60 houses for sale in Salisbury Downs.

The Hollywood Drive-in opened in the suburb on 20 December 1967 and closed on 26 January 1985. Its former car park forms part of the site of the Hollywood Plaza shopping centre, and the drive-in's screen, the last remaining structure, was demolished in February 2018. With 1,100 car spaces and a 120-by-54-foot screen, it was described as the largest drive-in in South Australia. In its later years the screen carried a large rainbow shooting star, a landmark for motorists travelling into Adelaide.

Many of the suburb's streets share their names with film studios. These include the Hollywood studios Paramount Road, Goldwyn Avenue, Metro Street, Universal Road, Warner Road and Fox Street, and the British studios Gaumont Street, Gainsborough Street, Ealing Street, Elstree Street and Pinewood Street, alongside Hollywood Boulevard. Others share their names with figures of early Hollywood, such as De Mille Street, Swanson Street and Jolsen Street. A second group shares its names with the counties of Ireland: Antrim Street, Armagh Crescent, Carlow Street, Cork Street, Donegal Street, Down Crescent, Dublin Avenue, Galway Crescent, Kerry Street, Kildare Avenue, Leitrim Street, Limerick Street, Londonderry Avenue, Mayo Crescent, Meath Avenue, Roscommon Street, Tipperary Court, Waterford Street, Wexford Street and Wicklow Street, together with Shamrock Place and O'Connell Street. A third group shares its names with European towns and cities, including Amsterdam Crescent, Arnhem Court, Bonn Court, Breda Court, Leyden Court, Narvik Court, Rotterdam Road, Venlo Court and Vienna Place.

Salisbury Downs Post Office opened on 8 July 1991.

== Demographics ==
At the 2021 census, Salisbury Downs had a population of 6,296. The median age was 37, compared with 41 for South Australia as a whole.

Of residents, 56.3% were born in Australia. The next most common countries of birth were Vietnam (5.0%), England (4.7%), Afghanistan (2.9%), the Philippines (2.6%) and India (2.5%). English was the only language used at home by 55.8% of residents; the most common other languages were Vietnamese (7.3%), Khmer (3.0%), Hazaraghi (2.5%), Nepali (2.3%) and Italian (1.8%).

The most common religious responses were no religion (34.0%), Catholic (18.0%), Islam (7.9%) and Buddhism (7.4%). The median weekly household income was $1,134, compared with $1,455 for South Australia. Separate houses made up 79.3% of occupied private dwellings, and 35.3% of dwellings were rented.

== Facilities ==
=== Retail ===
The suburb's main shopping centre is Hollywood Plaza, located at the corner of Spains Road and Winzor Street. Its major retailers include Coles, Target and Woolworths. In keeping with its name, the centre has a Hollywood theme, with a statue of Marilyn Monroe, a giant Oscar statuette, and a walk of stars set into the floor honouring Australian and international stars of stage, screen and radio.

=== Education ===
The suburb has two preschools, Salisbury Downs Preschool Centre on Donegal Street and Riverview Preschool Centre on Riverview Drive.

Schools in Salisbury Downs include:

- Salisbury Downs Primary School, a government primary school on Paramount Road, established in 1975;
- Riverdale Primary School, a government primary school on De Mille Street, formerly known as Riverdale R-7 School;
- Thomas More College, a Catholic secondary college established in 1979.

=== Health ===
General practices in the suburb include Hollywood Surgery on Winzor Street and Premium Care Medical Practice.

=== Cemetery ===
Salisbury Memorial Park, the City of Salisbury's council-run cemetery, is in the suburb at the corner of Spains Road and York Terrace. It offers burials, including a children's section, and entombment in a mausoleum.

=== Sport and recreation ===
Salisbury Downs Oval, near Galway Crescent, is an Australian rules football and cricket ground and the home of the Salisbury West Football Club. The reserve also includes play equipment and a basketball court.

The Salisbury West Sports Club, based on Londonderry Avenue, has fielded junior and senior teams in Australian rules football and cricket, as well as netball teams that played at The Gardens Recreation Centre, and has two lit ovals. The club now operates as the Salisbury Downs Sports and Community Club, and in October 2024 it celebrated the return of cricket to Salisbury Downs Oval.

The Salisbury West Football Club, nicknamed the Tigers, was founded in 1965 and played its home games at Salisbury Downs Oval. It spent most of its first three decades in the Northern Metropolitan Football League, winning A-grade premierships in 1985 and 1987, before a single season in the South Australian Football Association in 1995. It then joined the South Australian Amateur Football League (now the Adelaide Footy League), where it won the Division 7 premiership in 2016. In August 2018 the club's senior teams were removed from the league for the rest of the season after its captain broke an opponent's jaw in a match at Salisbury Downs Oval, and the league later rejected the club's application to return in 2019.

Salisbury West was the junior club of Scott Hodges. Hodges went on to play 183 games and kick 684 goals for Port Adelaide in the South Australian National Football League, won the 1990 Magarey Medal, and set the league's single-season goalkicking record with 153 goals in 1990. He also played 38 games and kicked 100 goals for the Adelaide Football Club in the Australian Football League between 1991 and 1996.

== Transport ==
The Gawler railway line runs along the suburb's eastern boundary. The nearest station, Chidda, is on York Terrace in neighbouring Salisbury and is served by Gawler line trains to Adelaide.

Adelaide Metro bus routes 404 and 405 run a loop between Salisbury Interchange and Paralowie in opposite directions, travelling through Salisbury Downs via Spains Road, Winzor Street and Hollywood Plaza.

== Notable people ==
- Angelo Costanzo - Australian soccer player, who played 127 National Soccer League games for Adelaide City and 73 A-League games for Adelaide United, captaining the club in its first AFC Champions League campaign in 2007. He lived in Salisbury Downs.
- Brandon Borrello - Australian professional footballer and Socceroo, who grew up in Salisbury Downs.
- Vinh Giang - Australian magician, entrepreneur and communication coach, who grew up in Salisbury Downs.
- Matthew Bode - Australian rules footballer, who played 108 AFL games for Port Adelaide and the Adelaide Crows between 1998 and 2007, and played a season of club cricket in England for Bolton in the Lancashire League in 1997. He attended Salisbury Downs Primary School and played junior football at Salisbury West.
- Darel Hart - Australian rules footballer, who played junior football at Salisbury West. He played 39 AFL games for Adelaide in 1991 and 1992 and was inducted into the SANFL Hall of Fame in 2014.
- Richard Lounder - Australian rules footballer, who began his football at Salisbury West before playing for Central District in the SANFL. He was the first pick in the 1987 VFL national draft and played four games for Richmond in 1989.
- Stephen Carter - Australian rules footballer, who played junior football at Salisbury West. He played 172 SANFL games for Port Adelaide, winning five premierships, and 10 games for Port Adelaide in its first AFL season in 1997.
- Dave Williams - Australian stand-up comedian, who has performed at the Melbourne International Comedy Festival each year since 1999. He grew up in Salisbury Downs.
- Joseph Del Re - Australian actor, whose roles include Benny in the film Coffin Rock (2009), Ray Say in Darlinghurst Theatre Company's 2019 production of The Rise and Fall of Little Voice and Alex Bogdonavicius in the television miniseries The Claremont Murders (2023). His other television roles include Martin Coyle in Wild Boys (2011) and Lenny Gordon, a member of the Ouroboros gang, in Home and Away (2019). On stage, he played Haemon opposite Andrea Demetriades's Antigone in Sport for Jove's 2016 production of Antigone at the Seymour Centre, a performance StageNoise described as "effortlessly charming and princely" and critic John Shand as "real, likable and compelling". A graduate of the Flinders University Drama Centre, he won the Sunday Mail Best Professional Actor award in 2007 and was nominated for the Adelaide Critics Circle Emerging Artist Award in 2008. He grew up in Salisbury Downs and attended Salisbury Downs Primary School.
