= Burton, South Australia =

Burton
- Suburb

- Country: Australia
- State: South Australia
- City: Adelaide
- LGA: City of Salisbury
- Location: 21 km (13 mi) from Adelaide

Government
  - State electorate: Ramsay
  - Federal division: Spence

Area
  - Total: 9.6 km^{2} (3.7 sq mi)

Population
  - Total: 6,519 (SAL 2021)
- Postcode: 5110
- Mean max temp: 22.5 °C (72.5 °F)
- Mean min temp: 11.1 °C (52.0 °F)
- Annual rainfall: 438.5 mm (17.26 in)
Suburbs around Burton
Waterloo Corner	Waterloo Corner	Direk
Waterloo Corner	Burton	Salisbury North
Paralowie	Paralowie	Paralowie

Burton is a small residential suburb approximately 21 kilometres north of the CBD of Adelaide, South Australia. It is located five km north-west of Salisbury in the flat terrain of the Adelaide Plains. The suburb contains two wetland reserves, including Kaurna Park.

== History ==
The Kaurna, an Aboriginal Australian people, occupied the land of Burton and surrounding Adelaide Plains area prior to European settlement. The first Methodist chapel (also used as a schoolroom) was built in the Burton area in 1858.

== School ==
Burton Primary School

Burton Primary (R-7) is a local school which opened in 1990. It educates over 400 students each year. The students mainly come from low socio-economic backgrounds. In 2006, 30+% of the student population were School Card Holders. 40% of the student population came from Non-English Speaking Backgrounds and 15 nationalities were represented at the school. English as a Second Language (ESL) programs were given a high priority as were Maintenance of Mother Tongue (MTM). The two MTM languages offered were Khmer and Vietnamese.

Burton Primary was selected as an Apple Distinguished School, one of only 29 schools nationally.

== Transport ==
Map of Burton

Public Transport in Burton is serviced by Adelaide Metro. Three main bus services pass through the streets of Burton to Paralowie Shopping Centre, Mawson Interchange and Virginia.

== Environment ==
=== Wodliparri Trail at Kaurna Park ===
Kaurna Park

Kaurna Park is an Urban wetland, which was created from degraded farming land. The park was named after the Kaurna, a group of Indigenous Australians who traditionally owned the local land. The Wodliparri is a river that flows into the wetlands. Wodliparri is the Kaurna name for the Milky Way.

The park site contains winding trails with a series of board walks, which leads visitors across a series of channels and through a growing array of native flora. The wetland is both a home and stopping point for a number of animals, birds and other fauna.

The City of Salisbury and the Kaurna Aboriginal Community worked together to develop an Indigenous interpretive trail at the Kaurna Park wetlands site. The Kaurna Park Project was designed to build community respect for Kaurna culture and history. It is also hoped that Kaurna Park will become a focus for reconciliation between Indigenous and non-Indigenous Australians.

== Residents ==
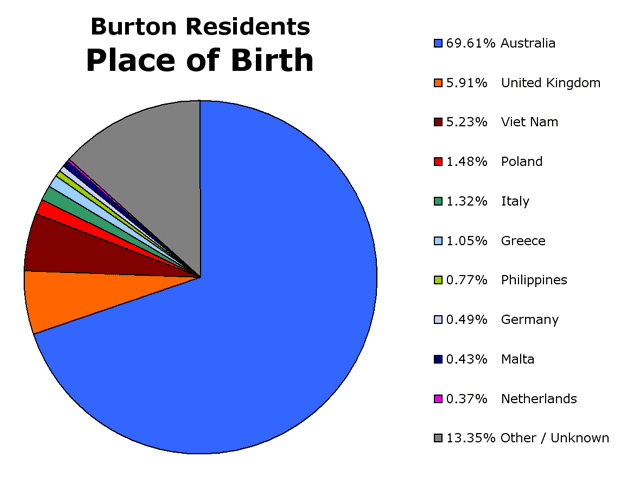
Burton Place of Birth chart

According to the 2001 Australian Bureau of Statistics Census, the population of Burton was 3,414 people, in an area of 9.6 square kilometres. The suburb was evenly distributed between genders with 50.44% male residents. The Census showed Burton was a multicultural community with 30.39% of residents born in the United Kingdom, Vietnam, Poland, Italy, Greece, and various other countries.

In 2001 45.56% of Burton residents were of Christian faith, primarily Catholic. 22.85% of people claimed to follow no religion, and 16.90% were Buddhist. Almost all dwellings in the suburb were Separate house with 99.36% of dwellings in this form. The suburb had an unemployment rate of 13.59%, which is greater than the state average. The Median age of residents was 27. The Median weekly individual income was $300–$399 and the median weekly household income was $700–$799.

== Politics ==
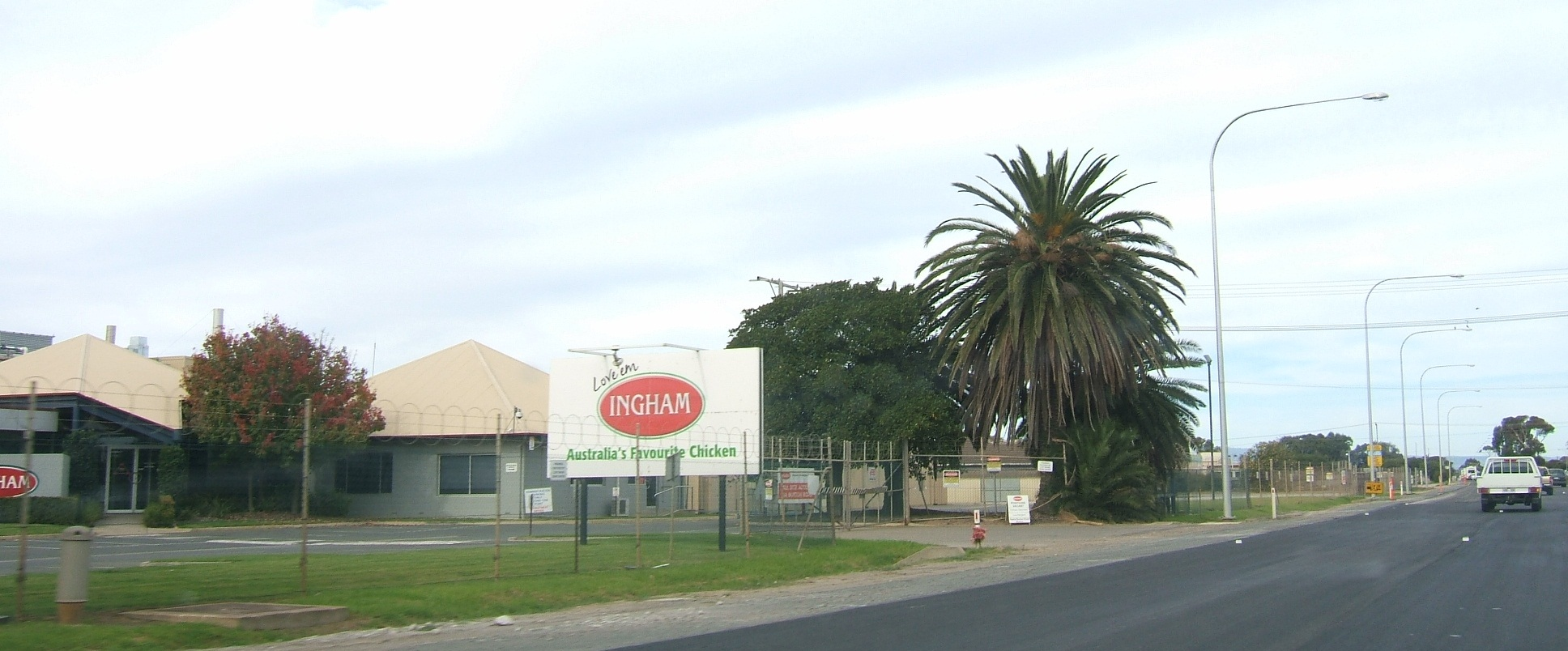
Inghams poultry factory in Burton

2006 state election
Labor	72.8%
Liberal	14.7%
Family First	7.6%
Greens	2.8%
Democrats	2.1%

2007 federal election
Labor	59.8%
Liberal	19.8%
Family First	9.3%
Greens	5.2%
Democrats	1.7%

== See also ==
- List of Adelaide suburbs
