= Paralowie, South Australia =

Paralowie
- Suburb
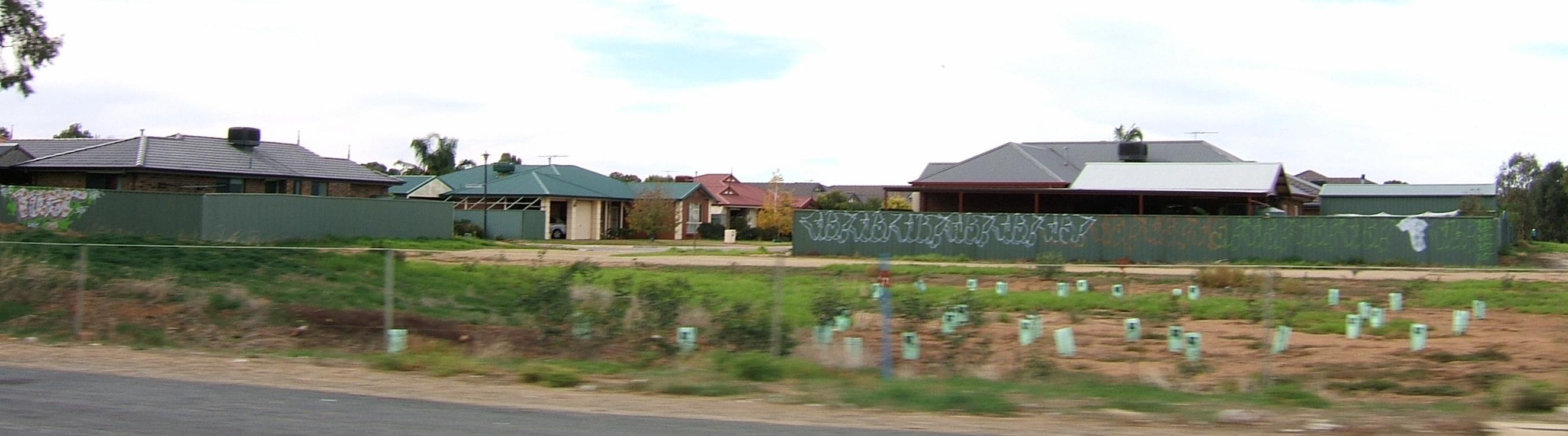
- Houses adjacent to Port Wakefield Road

- Country: Australia
- State: South Australia
- LGA: City of Salisbury

Government
  - State electorate: Ramsay Playford
  - Federal division: Spence

Area
  - Total: 7.5 km^{2} (2.9 sq mi)

Population
  - Total: 17,504 (SAL 2021)
- Postcode: 5108
Suburbs around Paralowie
Waterloo Corner	Burton	Salisbury North
Bolivar	Paralowie	Salisbury
Globe Derby Park	Parafield Gardens	Salisbury Downs

Paralowie /ˌpærəˈlaʊi/ is a suburb in the north of Adelaide, South Australia, 21.4 km (13.3 mi) north of the Adelaide city centre. It is predominantly a residential suburb.

== History ==
On November 27, 1980, the suburb was officially named, drawing from the Aboriginal languages "para" signifying river and "owie" representing water, settlement of the area dates from the late 19th century, with land used predominantly for market gardens and farms. Significant development did not occur until the post World War II years. Rapid growth occurred from the 1980s through to the mid-1990s. The population increased marginally between 2001 and 2006, as a result of new dwellings being added to the area.

On 30 October 2025, Paralowie acquired part of the neighbouring suburb of Bolivar, by notice of the South Australian Government Gazette.

== Demographics ==
The 2021 Census by the Australian Bureau of Statistics counted 17,816 persons in Paralowie on census night. Of these, 50.3% were male and 49.7% were female.

The most common countries of birth were Australia (65.9%), England (3.8%), Vietnam (3.3%) and Afghanistan (3.2%).

The most common languages used at home in Paralowie were English only (64.7%), Vietnamese (4.7%), Khmer (4.1%) and Punjabi (1.5%). Other languages used at home by more than 100 residents were Greek, Nepali, Polish, Spanish and Tagalog.

527 people (3.0%) identified as Aboriginal and/or Torres Strait Islander.

At the 2021 Census, the median age of Paralowie residents was 35 years, which is younger than the median age of Australians as a whole (38).

== Places of significance ==
=== Burton Primitive Methodist Cemetery ===
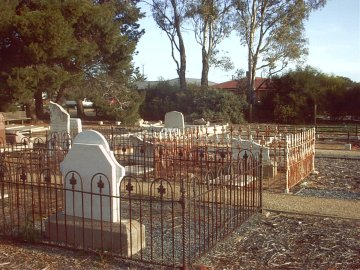
Burton Primitive Methodist Cemetery in 2004

Located on Bolivar Road, Paralowie, the now-closed cemetery is the only reminder of the Burton Methodist Church (used to stand by the side of Burton Road), built-in 1915, closed in 1950 and later demolished, and now marked with a memorial stone. An earlier church built in June 1858 also existed here and was used as a school until the 1950s. The first burial was that of George Diment, aged 10 1/2 years, in December 1866; burials continued until 1957, after which there was a substantial gap until the last burial in April 1971. Attempts have been made to restore the vandalised headstones in the cemetery because it is a site of historical significance.

=== Settler's Court ===
The former farmhouse located at 8 Settler's Court, Paralowie is listed as a State Heritage Place on the South Australian Heritage Register, because the Burdett family who lived on the property, who both developed a cattle stud and influenced local affairs. Also known as Judd's Homestead. It is reported as being "an important example of the larger pastoral properties that characterised the region prior to the urban development after World War Two."

=== Paralowie House and grounds ===
The villa located at 94 Waterloo Corner Road which was built in 1894, is listed both as a State Heritage Place on the South Australian Heritage Register and on the former Register of the National Estate. It is historically representative of the time which Salisbury North had not yet been incorporated into the Adelaide metropolitan area, but instead was home to a number of larger estates in what was still a semi-rural environment. It is an example of popular late 19th century architecture and is still in excellent condition. The house was often used for bonfires and gatherings during the Boer war. The premises is now used for a Commonwealth funded youth homelessness early intervention program run by the UnitingCare Wesley church.

=== Paralowie R-12 School ===
Located on Whites Road, Paralowie R-12 School has 1525 students from Reception to Year 12.
