= Waterloo Corner, South Australia =

Waterloo Corner
- Suburb
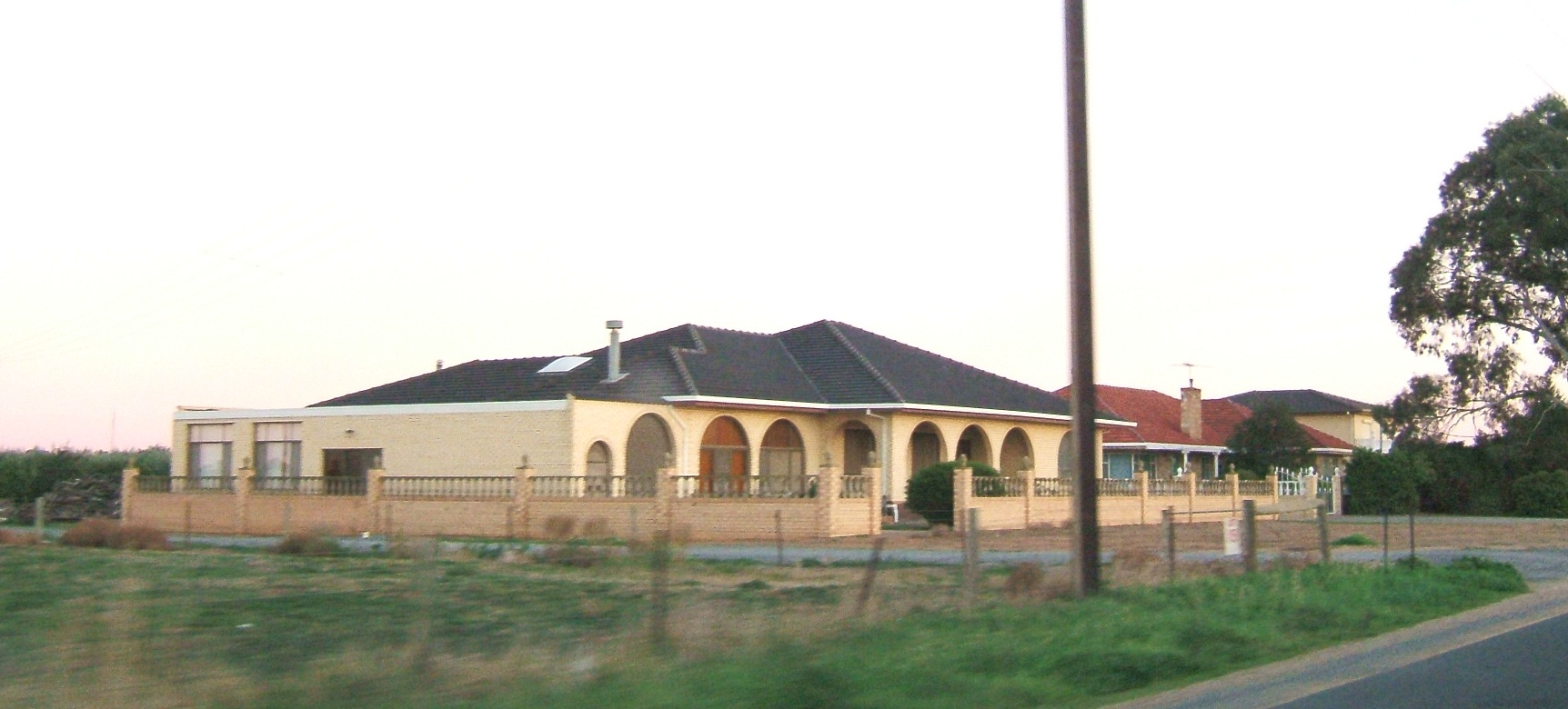
- House on Port Wakefield Road, Waterloo Corner

- Interactive map of Waterloo Corner
- Coordinates: 34°43′S 138°35′E
- Country: Australia
- State: South Australia
- City: Adelaide
- LGAs: City of Salisbury; City of Playford

Government
  - State electorate: Taylor
  - Federal division: Spence

Population
  - Total: 1,103 (SAL 2021)
- Postcode: 5110
Suburbs around Waterloo Corner
Buckland Park	Virginia	Penfield
	Waterloo Corner	Direk
St Kilda	Bolivar	Burton; Paralowie

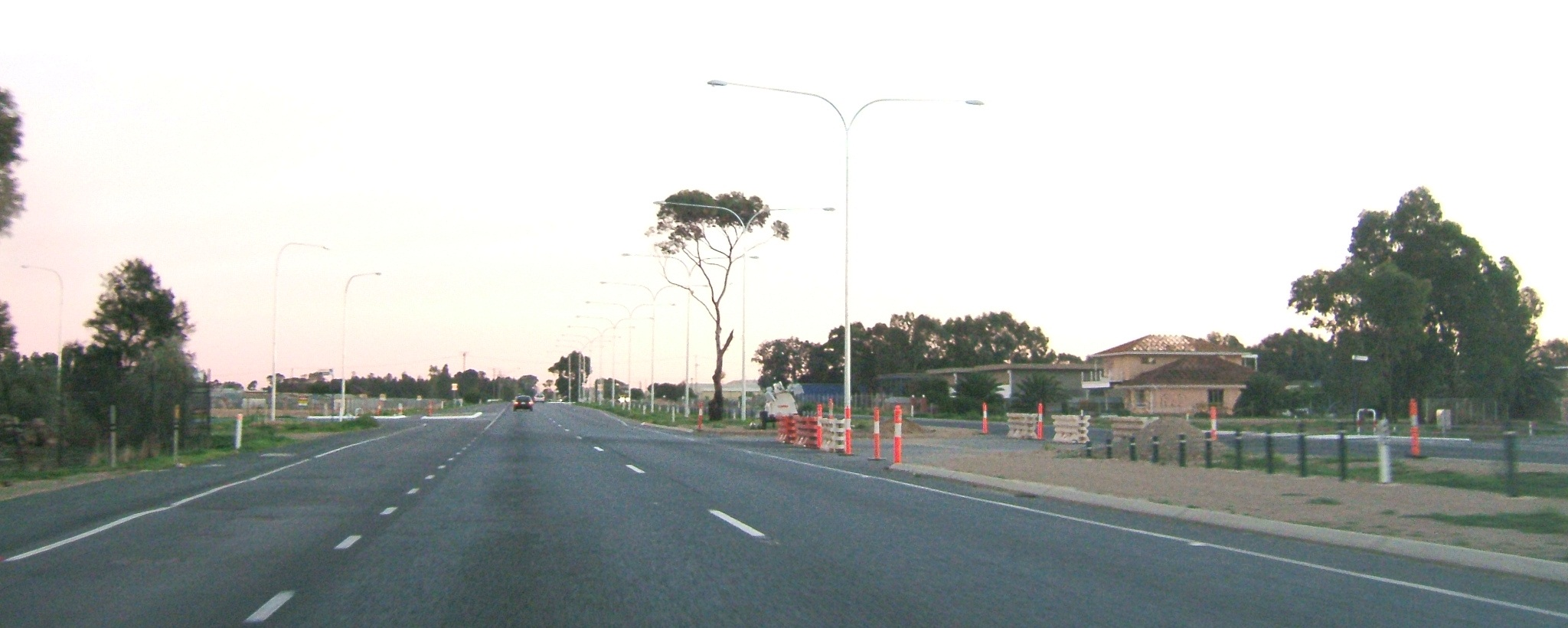
Port Wakefield Road. Waterloo Corner is on the left hand side

Waterloo Corner is a rural/urban suburb approximately 22 kilometres north of Adelaide, the capital city of South Australia. Most of the land is used for agricultural purposes, including wheat, olives, grapes and tomatoes. Port Wakefield Road runs through the suburb and thus much heavy freight traverses the suburb.

== History ==
The Waterloo Inn once stood at the junction of St Kilda Rd and Port Wakefield Rd, the suburb was established by Southern Estates Ltd in 1960, encompassing a portion of section 5028. Waterloo Corner was also once the location of the Elim Chapel and cemetery, which have since been demolished, the district also partially extends into the boundary of the City of Playford, the Waterloo Corner Post Office was closed in 1972. According to R.Praite Waterloo Corner may have been named after the infamous Battle of Waterloo that occurred in 1815 present day Belgium.
