= Gillian Aldridge =

Australian politician

Gillian Mary Aldridge OAM (born 11 November 1946) is the current mayor of the City of Salisbury, South Australia. Aldridge was first elected to council in 1988. She was deputy mayor from 2001 to 2008. Since 2008, she has been mayor, winning a fifth term in 2022 14,661 votes against 11,496 for former councillor Graham Reynolds.

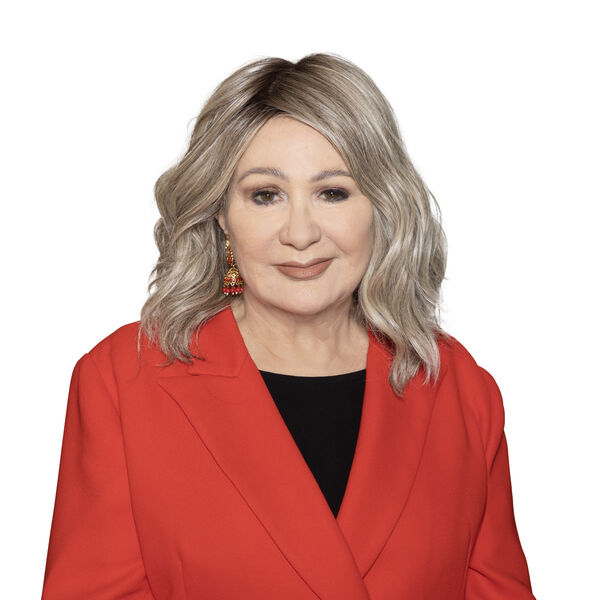
Gillian Aldridge

Aldridge has made numerous public statements in support of multiculturalism, including condemning racist behaviour and calling for the City of Salisbury's website to acknowledge the African heritage of its founder, John Harvey. She has stated that she is an "advocate for diversity". Aldridge was supportive of the controversial Drag Storytime event in 2023 and praised the attendees as "amazingly strong, wonderful people" for attending despite the abuse from protesters.

Aldridge defended the councils plans for use of smart city technology during the Salisbury smart cities controversy.

When a statue gifted by sister city Mobara was stolen from Mobara park, Aldridge described it as "the saddest thing that's happened since I've been mayor".

In recognition of her service, Aldridge received the Medal of the Order of Australia (OAM) in 2018, celebrating her outstanding contributions to local government.

Aldridge received $41,490 in gifts during the 2022 Council Election

Declaration of gifts during 2022 Council Election
Date	Donor	Amount	Notes
28-Feb-2022	Vater Eltrak Unit Trust	$2,500	
08-Mar-2022	Tyrone Electrical	$2,500	
11-Mar-2022	Solidstate	$2,000	
17-May-2022	M Calbabro MC	$5,000	
23-May-2022	Paulumbo Building	$2,500	
22-Jun-2022	Moveyourself	$1,200	
22-Jun-2022	Tyrone	$1,200	
22-Jun-2022	In2Development	$720	
23-Jun-2022	RPNSA	$920	
24-Jun-2022	KNT Pacific	$1,200	
04-Jul-2022	Martin Real Estate	$1,200	
14-Jul-2022	Vater Corporations	$4,050	
03-Aug-2022	Highway 1	$10,000	
05-Sep-2022	Basetec Services Pty	$500	
19-Sep-2022	MMH Allied Invest	$5,500	
14-Jul-2022	Wolf Bass Gallery and Museum	$500	

== Personal life ==
Aldridge resides in Mawson Lakes with her husband Robin and their two toy poodles. In interviews, she's mentioned she enjoys community events, home cooking, live music and spending time on her balcony overlooking the lake.

Aldridge is the mother of failed independent and Pauline Hansons One Nation political candidate, Mark Aldridge.

Civic offices
Preceded by Tony Zappia	Mayor of the City of Salisbury; 2008–present	Incumbent
