= Alexander Maurice Ramsay =

Australian public servant (1914–1978)

- Born: October 14, 1914; Parkside, South Australia
- Died: May 25, 1978 (aged 63); Adelaide, South Australia
- Occupation: Public Servant
- Years active: 1949-1978
- Known for: General Manager of the South Australian Housing Trust.

Alexander Maurice Ramsay (1914–1978) was a public servant, teacher, and 25-year General Manager of the South Australian Housing Trust.

== Early life ==
Ramsay was born on 27 October 1914, in Parkside, a suburb of Adelaide, South Australia.

== Working life ==
A public servant, trained and worked as a teacher before gaining his degree at the University of Adelaide in 1941.

In 1943, Ramsay was appointed to the South Australian Housing Trust, with which he was to remain all his life. General manager of the Trust from 1949, dubbed South Australia's 'Mr Housing', he met urgent postwar housing needs and later oversaw the establishment of Elizabeth, a whole new satellite town on then Adelaide's northern fringe.

== Death ==
Ramsay died of myocardial infarction on 25 May 1978 at the Adelaide Club and was cremated.

== Recognition ==
The South Australian House of Assembly Electoral district of Ramsay created in 1985 is named in his honour.

Ramsay Park at Edinburgh North, home to the Playford City Soccer Club, was also named in his honour.
