= Salisbury High School (South Australia) =

Location
- 14 Farley Grove; Salisbury North, South Australia; 34°45′22″S 138°38′26″E

Information
- Type: Public
- Motto: Pathways to Success
- Established: 1959
- Principal: Sylvia Groves
- Teaching staff: 79
- Grades: 7–12
- Enrolment: 1061 (July 2023)
- Colours: Golden blue , white and yellow
- Website: www.salisburyhigh.sa.edu.au

Salisbury High School is a secondary public school located at 14 Farley Grove in the suburb of Salisbury North, Adelaide, South Australia. Established in 1959, in 2023 Salisbury High School had a student population of 1061 and employed 79 teaching staff. There are currently four school houses: Cairns, Florey, Mawson, and Oliphant.

In 2005, Salisbury High School became an IB World School but converted back to an Australian Curriculum school in 2016.
