= Grace Bawden =

Australian classical crossover singer

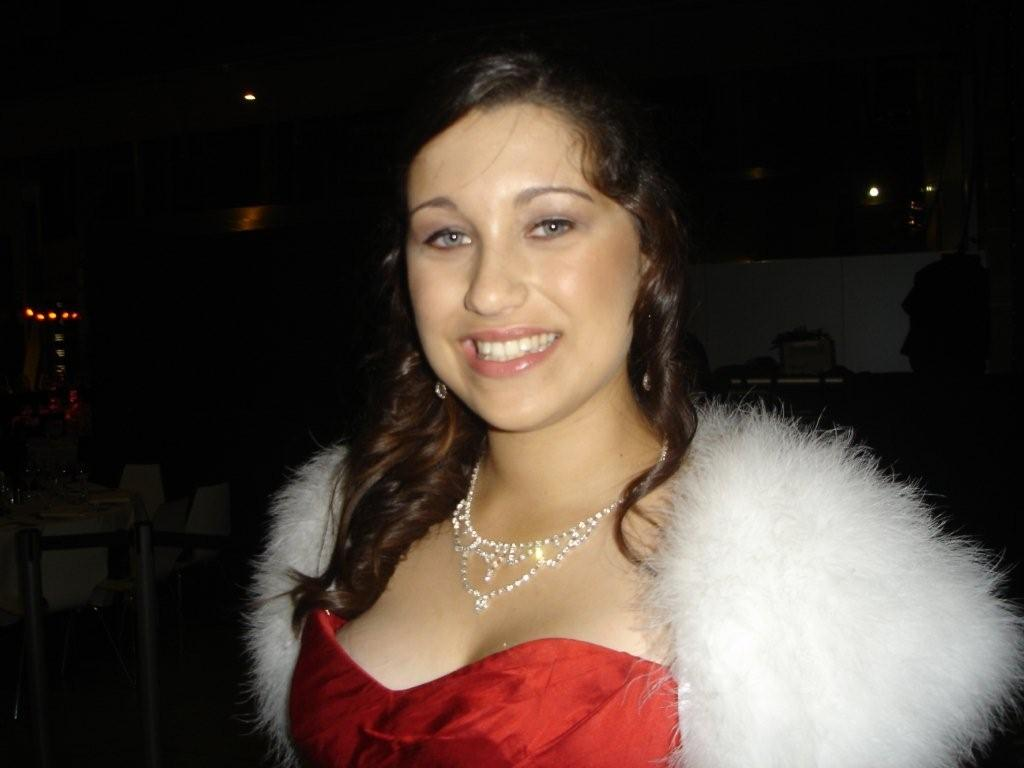
- Grace Bawden in 2013

Background information
- Born: 7 October 1992 (age 33)
- Origin: Adelaide, South Australia, Australia
- Genres: Classical crossover, operatic pop
- Occupation: Singer
- Instrument: Vocals
- Years active: 2007–present
- Label: GBP
- Website: gracebawden.com

Grace Bawden (born 7 October 1992) is an Australian classical crossover singer from Adelaide. She competed on the second season of Australia's Got Talent (2008) and subsequently issued her debut album, Gifts of Grace (September 2009). She portrayed Yum-Yum in a South Australian production of The Mikado (March–May 2016), which toured Australia. Bawden was elected as a councilor for the City of Salisbury, but faced numerous controversies and was later removed for absenteeism.

== Background ==
Grace Bawden grew up in Adelaide, South Australia with her mother, Matilda Bawden, and brother, Luke Bawden. Matilda has Italian, Serbian and Aboriginal heritage. In late 2013 Bawden learnt that her father had been adopted – his birth mother is Shirley Peisley. Bawden met her new-found grandmother, Peisley, and extended family in early 2014. Peisley is an Aboriginal woman of the Ngarrindjeri nation and was a referendum campaigner in 1967, which resulted in Indigenous Australians being counted in subsequent censuses.

Bawden's singing voice was first noticed by Matilda, who heard her daughter mimicking Italian opera. Bawden began singing lessons at a local music store, at six years old. She attended Thomas More College and Parafield Gardens High School. One of her early jobs was as a dental assistant. In January 2012 Bawden was named Young Salisbury Citizen of the Year at the Australia Day celebrations.

== Career ==
Bawden entered singing competitions from the age of 10 to 14, throughout South Australia. In 2006 Bawden performed in front of an audience of 30,000 at the Advertiser-Adelaide City Council, Carols by Candlelight. In February 2007 Bawden co-wrote two tracks and recorded material with producer and songwriter, Audius Mtawarira (Delta Goodrem, Guy Sebastian, Paulini). In mid-2007 Bawden was invited by TV presenter, Richard Wilkins, to perform on Nine Network's breakfast news program, Today.

Bawden prepared to audition for Australia's Got Talent (AGT) by busking in Adelaide. In December 2007 she was interviewed by former Australian Idol judge, Mark Holden live on 5AA radio. After singing a Christmas Carol, Grace Bawden Promotions Pty Ltd (GBP) was formed with the support of local investors. Bawden auditioned for the second season of Australia's Got Talent in February 2008 and the judges approved of her rendition of "O Mio Babbino Caro". In the semi-finals Bawden was named Judge's Choice after performing, "Ebben? Ne andrò lontana" from La Wally. She was dubbed "Australia's greatest operatic discovery." In the Grand Final, Bawden performed Léo Delibes' "Flower Duet" (Yanni's Aria version) which she translated to English from its French lyrics, after a judge requested that she sing in English. Bawden was in the second pair of contestants that were voted off, making Top 6. Despite an offer of contract by a major label, Bawden remained an independent artist.

Bawden recorded her debut extended play and was signed by talent manager Max Markson, and began negotiations with a major label. Despite an offer of a contract, GBP released a six-track extended play, Grace Bawden, independently after loss of confidence in the label. It was produced by Mtawarira at The Sound Academy and East Street Studios, Sydney. Bawden was backed by Brian Campeau on guitar, Damiel Carmichael on trombone, Emanuel Lieberfruendd on flute and saxophone, Katarina Papalo on violin, Leo Kram on viola, Morad Samaloussi on guitar, Peter Urquhart on violin, Sophie Glasson on cello, Barbara Griffin on piano and Rory Brown on strings.

In 2008 Bawden appeared at the South Australian National Football League Grand Final, in front of a crowd of over 40,000. Bawden's debut album Gifts of Grace was released in September 2009 via Blind Faith Entertainment with Mtawarira producing again. Classical-Crossover's writer rated it at four-out-of-five stars and explained, "[it] conveys an artist that does not want to be pigeon-holed, does not want to be a commodity, and an artist that has advanced and mature understanding of music and what it means to her. Bawden is someone well worth giving a chance." Staff writer for Female.com.au observed, "[it's] a blend of contemporary and classical songs in the most original interpretation of some of the world's most favourite songs and songwriters."

In September 2010 Bawden travelled to London and Italy to audition for opera schools, including with Mirella Freni, the Centro Universale del Bel Canto (CUBEC) and La Scuola Dell' Opera Italiana (SOI) in Bologna. Bawden was ranked "fit for entry" to CUBEC, but due to her young age missed out on a scholarship. She was accepted for private tuition with SOI.

Bowden made her operatic debut as Cio-Cio-San in Co-Opera's production of Madame Butterfly in mid-2014. She then took the role of Yum-Yum in The Gilbert and Sullivan Society of South Australia and Co-Opera's joint-production of The Mikado, which toured Australian states of South Australia, Victoria, New South Wales and Queensland from March to May 2016. Bawden was due to record her second album, with Nashville's Keith Thomas producing, during 2017.

== Music and voice ==
Bawden has been classified as a lyric-coloratura soprano, and has a vocal range of over 3½ octaves. Although she became known as an opera singer on Australia's Got Talent, Bawden also sings pop, contemporary, jazz, traditional, musical theatre and arias. Her debut album includes cover versions of Midge Ure's "Dear God", Bruce Springsteen's "Streets of Philadelphia", Barbra Streisand's "People", Kansas' "Dust in the Wind" and Paul McCartney's and John Lennon's "Long and Winding Road".

In early 2009 Bawden was introduced to Los Angeles-based composer, Gregory Hinde, by Krystine McLeod to co-write "Angels Will Watch", which was included on Gifts of Grace. Grace's debut single, was a cover version of Iva Davies' "Man of Colours" (July 2009), and included a music video. It received Davies' blessing and was aired on national television program, Rage on 4 September 2009.

== Salisbury Council ==
Bawden was elected as a councilor of the City of Salisbury in 2022. A complaint was made to the Electoral Commission of SA (ECSA) that Bawdens campaign image was fraudulent because it was not taken within the previous 12 months as required by the Local Government Act. Bawden's opponent, Ananda Sukanpally, claimed that the image used was 6 years old. Bawden was criticized with fellow councilor Cr Burner for perpetuating conspiracies about smart city technologies. Bawden was later was removed from office in 2023 with fellow councilor Severina Burner for failing to attend meetings, amidst behavioral complaints and conspiracy theories. She accused Salisbury Council of calling her a conspiracy theorist. Bawden is an anti-vax supporter.

== Charitable work ==
In November 2009 Bawden received the "Living Legend Award" for the City of Salisbury in recognition of her long-standing charitable work within her local community, her contribution as a role model for young people and for her accomplishments in the Arts.

== Discography ==
=== Albums ===
- Gifts of Grace (September 2009) – Blind Faith Entertainment (BFCD6103)

Track listing

  - "Streets of Philadelphia" (Bruce Springsteen)
  - "Longer"
  - "Dear God" (Midge Ure)
  - "Cold Outside" (featuring Soweto Gospel Choir)
  - "Flower Duet" (Léo Delibes, Yiannis Chryssomallis, Grace Bawden)
  - "People" (Jule Styne, Bob Merrill)
  - "Man of Colours" (Iva Davies)
  - "Long and Winding Road" (John Lennon, Paul McCartney)
  - "Now and Forever"
  - "Just Breathe" (Bawden, Audius Mtawarira)
  - "Dust in the Wind" (Kerry Livgren)
  - "Angels Will Watch" (Gregory Hinde, Bawden)
  - "Amazing Grace" (John Newton)

=== Extended plays ===
- Grace Bawden (2008) – GBP (GBP001)

Track listing

  - "Man of Colours" (Iva Davies)
  - "Dust in the Wind" (Kerry Kivgren)
  - "Streets of Philadelphia" (Bruce Springsteen)
  - "Flower Duet" (Leo Delibis, Yanni, Grace Bawden)
  - "Long and Winding Road" (John Lennon and Paul McCartney)
  - "Dear God"(Midge Ure)

=== Singles ===
- "Man of Colours" (2009)
- "If I Only Had Wings" (2010)
- "Send Me an Angel" (by Gabrielle Stahlschmidt, Abigail Stahlschmidt & Grace Bawden) (2016)
