= Thomas More College (South Australia) =

Location
- 23 Amsterdam Crescent, Salisbury Downs, South Australia; Australia; 34°46′48″S 138°37′53″E

Information
- Type: Independent co-educational secondary day school
- Motto: God's Servant First
- Denomination: Roman Catholic
- Patron saint: Saint Thomas More
- Established: 1979; 47 years ago
- Founders: Fr Phil Hosking SJ; Dean Travers
- Principal: Corey Tavella
- Chaplain: Cardinal George Pell
- Faculty: 158
- Teaching staff: 96 Full time, 5 Part Time
- Years: Year 7 to Year 12
- Enrollment: 1,165 students
- Colours: Black, green, white and Red
- Nickname: TMC
- Newspaper: More News
- Website: tmc.catholic.edu.au

Thomas More College is an independent Roman Catholic co-educational secondary day school, located in the northern Adelaide suburb of Salisbury Downs, South Australia, Australia.

== Overview ==
Established in 1979, the college is named in honour of Saint Thomas More, an English lawyer, polemicist, politician and martyr. Its motto, “God’s Servant first”, is derived from the saint's last words before he was executed.

The college's catchment area is the northern Adelaide Parishes of Salisbury, Elizabeth North, Elizabeth South, Gawler, Virginia and Para Hills.

== See also ==
- List of schools in South Australia
- Catholic education in Australia
