= Alex Antic =

Australian politician (born 1974)

Senator Alex Antic
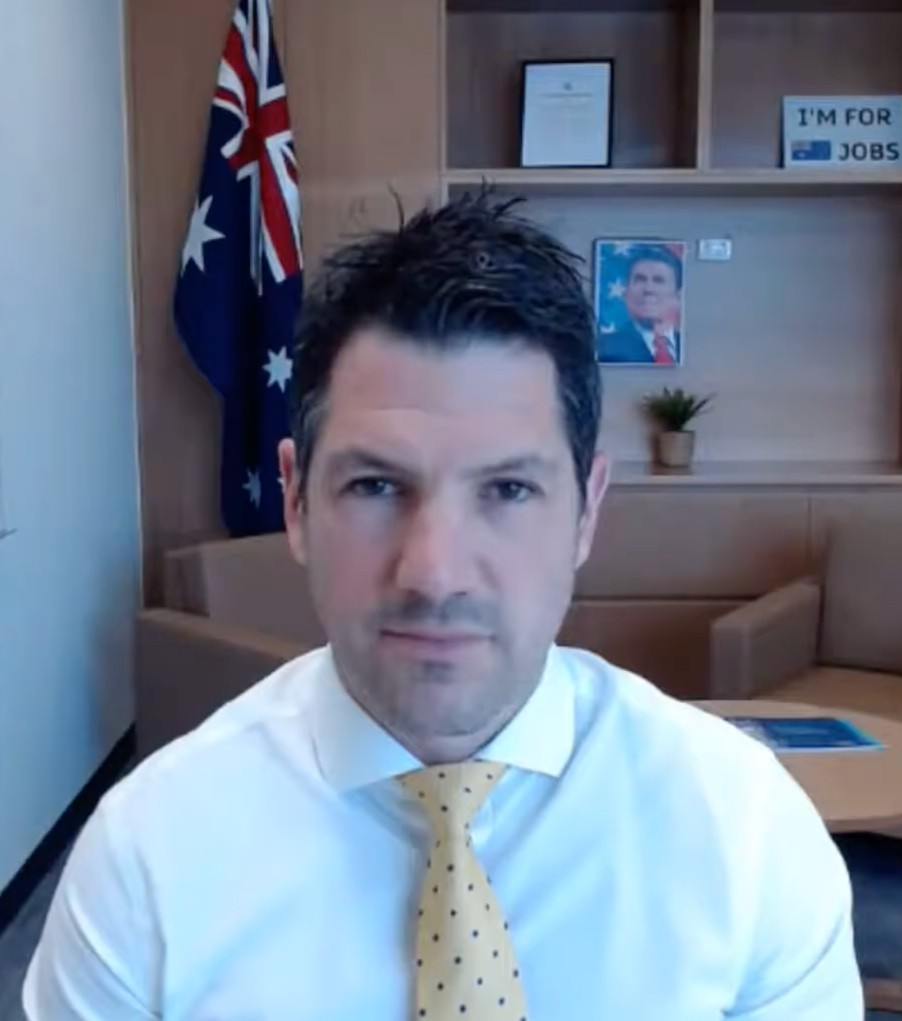
- Antic in 2021

Senator for South Australia
- Incumbent
- Assumed office 1 July 2019

President of the South Australian Liberal Party
- Incumbent
- Assumed office 19 September 2026
- Preceded by: Leah Blyth

Vice-President of the South Australian Liberal Party
- In office 2016–2019

Personal details
- Born: Alexander Charles Antic; 1974 (age 51–52) Adelaide, South Australia, Australia
- Party: Liberal
- Education: University of Adelaide
- Profession: Lawyer, politician

Alexander Charles Antic (born 1974) is an Australian far-right (Note: Attributed to multiple sources:) politician who has been a senator for South Australia since 2019. He is aligned with the right faction of the Liberal Party in SA, and was elected president of the state branch in September 2026. He is a vaccine sceptic and many of his political views are aligned with the far right and Christian right.

== Early life and education ==
Alexander Charles Antic was born in Adelaide in 1974, the son of Vicki Anderson and Ratomir "Ral" Antic. In his maiden speech to parliament he stated his belief that he was the first Australian senator of Serbian descent. His father arrived in Australia from Yugoslavia in 1957 and eventually became director of thoracic medicine at Royal Adelaide Hospital. Antic's only sibling was a brother, Nick, who died from a brain tumour in 2016.

Antic attended Burnside Primary School and Pembroke School in Adelaide's eastern suburbs.

He earned arts and law degrees from the University of Adelaide.

== Law career ==
Before entering politics Antic was a senior associate with Tindall Gask Bentley lawyers.

== Political career ==
=== Adelaide City Council ===
He served on the Adelaide City Council from 2014 to 2018, representing the south ward. In that role, he argued that local governments must concentrate on the delivery of services, rather than "being used as a vehicle for identity politics". He also used his position on the council to press for the preservation of Australia Day.

=== Federal Parliament ===
Antic was elected to the Australian Senate at the 2019 federal election, taking office on 1 July 2019. In the Liberal preselection process, he had out-polled sitting senator Lucy Gichuhi, a fellow member of the party's conservative faction.

In September 2023, Antic joined a cross-party delegation of Australian MPs to Washington, D.C., to lobby the U.S. Department of Justice to abandon its attempts to extradite Australian publisher Julian Assange from the United Kingdom. The other members were Barnaby Joyce, Monique Ryan, David Shoebridge, Peter Whish-Wilson, and Tony Zappia.

In March 2024, Antic defeated Liberal moderate and Shadow Health Minister Anne Ruston, to gain the leading position on the South Australian Liberal senate ticket for the 2025 Australian federal election. When asked about taking the position from a woman, given the Liberals' low number of women in parliament, Antic responded that “the ‘gender card’ is nothing but a grievance narrative”. Antic's success in securing the top spot on the ticket led to criticism from other South Australian Liberals. Former fellow councillors Anne Moran and (now Greens MLC) Rob Simms said that they had been aligned and got on well on the Adelaide City Council, but that Antic's politics had shifted to the right since then.

=== President of SA Liberals ===
Antic has recruited evangelical and Pentecostal Christians into the party in South Australia. On 19 September 2026, Antic was elected president of the South Australian branch of the Liberal Party, winning 119 votes to 73, over the only other candidate, Nicola Centofanti. The prospect of Antic as president led to speculation that the federal party might forcibly take over the state branch because of concerns over the senator's close relationship with far-right One Nation party. RedBridge poll director and former Liberal Party strategist Tony Barry previously called Antic a "vote-losing machine" for the party.

== Political views ==
Antic's political views have frequently been described as far-right, hard-right, Christian-right, and populist. Antic is aligned with the right faction within the South Australian Liberals, and, during the Morrison government, was identified with the National Right faction of the federal Liberal Party.

In his maiden speech in September 2019, Antic spoke of his support for the development of an Australian nuclear power industry. He also lambasted "the tyranny of political correctness", and criticised the push towards developing renewable sources of energy. In November 2019, he opposed moves to decriminalise sex work in South Australia, stating that sex workers were being exploited and that it was hypocritical to support decriminalisation while opposing the use of grid girls at the Australian Grand Prix and Clipsal 500.

In the early 2020s he appeared regularly on Sky News Australia and was a guest on far-right programs, including Steve Bannon's podcast. He was set to be the MC for a speaking tour of Donald Trump Jr before it was cancelled, and was a guest at a forum with disgraced former Hillsong preacher Pat Mesiti.

In 2024, Antic voted against the Australian Government's proposed legislation to ban children under 16 from social media. He was the only Liberal Party senator who voted against it.

In 2026, Antic was the only Liberal Party senator to vote against the Albanese government's hate speech legislation.

=== Anti-vaccinationism ===
Antic built an online following by courting vaccine sceptics during the COVID-19 pandemic and railing against "woke" culture. In November 2021, Antic was one of five Coalition senators who voted in support of One Nation's COVID-19 Vaccination Status (Prevention of Discrimination) Bill 2021, against the government's position.

In December 2021, it was alleged that Antic misled Prime Minister Scott Morrison about his COVID-19 vaccination status after Morrison claimed Antic had been double-vaccinated during a radio interview. Antic returned to Adelaide from Canberra having obtained a travel exemption for unvaccinated persons, the exemption having only been granted on appeal, on the condition he spent 14 days in quarantine. However, on arrival he allegedly refused to provide his vaccination status to officials at Adelaide Airport, and then posted a video to social media claiming he had been "detained by overzealous bureaucrats", in what he called a "political stunt".

In June 2026 Antic mocked bird flu, which had just been discovered for the first time in Australia, as "spin from pharmaceutical companies" aimed at coercing people into getting flu vaccination shots that winter.

=== LGBTQ issues ===
In a Senate estimates hearing in November 2022, Antic accused the Australian Broadcasting Corporation (ABC) of "grooming children with [...] adult content" over a Play School segment that featured drag queen Courtney Act reading a children's book. In response, Act stated that "to use terms of abuse when no abuse is actually happening, really takes away from the occasions when it is happening [...] I'm on television, reading a children’s book, there was nothing untoward about it. It was really quite a shocking thing to be accused of".

In late 2023, Antic proposed a bill to ban gender reassignment surgery and treatment for teenagers.

In March 2026, Antic defended Carston Woodhouse after he was expelled from the SA Liberals for claiming that acceptance of homosexuality opened "demonic realms".

=== Digital technology and smart cities ===
In June 2022, Antic raised broad concerns about Australia's digital future being a surveillance and privacy risk, including that sensitive biometric data could be a target for hackers and malicious foreign agents. In December 2022, Antic released a video about the smart cities programs as a "rise of the digital surveillance state" with concerns that is represented a dystopian future and claiming "your city is tracking you". Antic's comments were used by No Smart Cities Action Group to protest the Salisbury smart cities controversy, while Antic denied involvement with the group and requested for his image to be removed.
