= Electoral district of Ramsay =

South Australian state electoral district

Ramsay South Australia—House of Assembly
- Interactive map of electoral district boundaries from the 2022 state election (Note: The electorate will have no change in boundaries at the 2026 state election.)
- State: South Australia
- Created: 1985
- MP: Zoe Bettison
- Party: Labor
- Namesake: Alexander Ramsay
- Electors: 26,796 (2018)
- Area: 19.07 km^{2} (7.4 sq mi)
- Demographic: Metropolitan
- Coordinates: 34°46′31″S 138°37′55″E
Electorates around Ramsay:
Taylor	Taylor Elizabeth	King
Port Adelaide	Ramsay	King
Port Adelaide	Playford	Wright

Ramsay is a single-member electoral district for the South Australian House of Assembly. It is named after Alexander Ramsay, who was general manager of the South Australian Housing Trust for 25 years. It is a 24.7 km² suburban electorate north of Adelaide—based on the angle between Main North Road and the Port Wakefield Road, Ramsay covers the outer northern Adelaide suburbs of Brahma Lodge, Burton, Direk, a portion of Elizabeth South, Elizabeth Vale, a portion of Paralowie, Salisbury, Salisbury South, Salisbury Plain and Salisbury North.

Ramsay was first contested at the 1985 election. Two of three representatives of the electorate have served as Premier of South Australia. It is a safe Labor seat, with the fifth-largest Labor margin in the state at the 1997 election, second-largest at the 2002 election, and largest at the 2006 election where Labor won 71.5 percent of the first preference vote and 78.5 percent of the two-party vote, and the largest at the 2010 election. A 2012 Ramsay by-election occurred on 11 February as a result of Mike Rann's resignation from parliament, Labor easily retained the seat and maintained the largest Labor seat margin. It had the second largest margin following the 2014 election.

At the 2020 redistribution, Ramsay gained the suburbs of Brahma Lodge, Burton, Direk, Elizabeth Vale and Salisbury South. It also gained a portion of the suburb of Elizabeth South and the remainder of the suburb of Salisbury North but lost the suburb of Salisbury Downs and a portion of the suburb of Paralowie to the Electorate of Playford.

== Members for Ramsay ==
Member	Party	Term
Lynn Arnold	Labor	1985–1993
Mike Rann	Labor	1993–2012
Zoe Bettison	Labor	2012–present

== Election results ==
2026 South Australian state election: Ramsay
Party	Candidate	Votes	%	±%
Labor	Zoe Bettison	7,799	50.9	−9.1
One Nation	Ralph Chambers	4,134	27.0	+27.0
Greens	Luke Skinner	1,241	8.1	+0.9
Liberal	Daryl McCann	912	5.9	−15.5
Legalise Cannabis	Mark Eckermann	516	3.4	+3.4
Family First	Luz Velasquez	451	2.9	−8.5
United Voice	Nic Owen	123	0.8	+0.8
Australian Family	Ashley Gaylor	99	0.6	+0.6
Fair Go	Leo Demitriou	61	0.4	+0.4
Total formal votes		15,336	94.8	
Informal votes		839	5.2	
Turnout		16,175		
Two-candidate-preferred result
Labor	Zoe Bettison	9,762	63.7	−6.3
One Nation	Ralph Chambers	5,574	36.3	+36.3
Labor hold		Swing	−6.3	

Results are not final. Last updated on 22 March at 12:35am ACDT.
