= Tony Zappia =

Australian politician and powerlifter

Tony Zappia MP
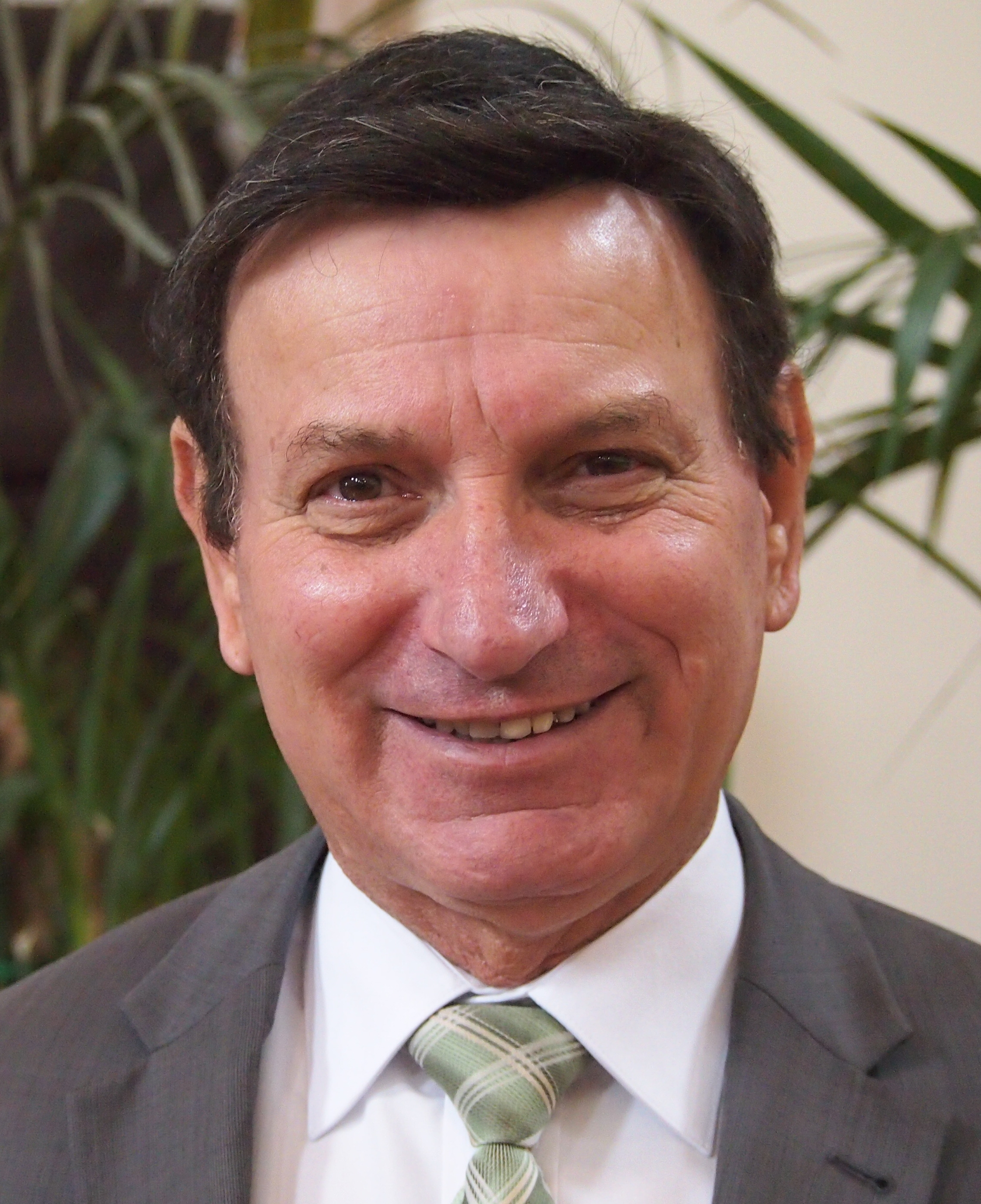

Member of the Australian Parliament for Makin
- Incumbent
- Assumed office 24 November 2007
- Preceded by: Trish Draper

Mayor of the City of Salisbury
- In office 3 May 1997 – 21 December 2007
- Preceded by: David Plumridge
- Succeeded by: Gillian Aldridge

Alderman of the Salisbury Council
- In office 2 July 1977 – 21 December 2007
- Preceded by: seat established
- Succeeded by: Brian Goodall
- Constituency: Pooraka

Personal details
- Born: Antonio Zappia; 13 June 1952 (age 74) Platì, Reggio Calabria, Italy
- Citizenship: Australian; Italian (1952–1958)
- Party: Labor
- Spouse: Vicki
- Children: 3
- Occupation: Businessman, athlete
- Website: tonyzappia.alp.org.au

Antonio "Tony" Zappia (Italian: [anˈtɔːnjo ddzapˈpiːa]; born 13 June 1952) is an Australian politician and former powerlifting champion. He has been an Australian Labor Party member for the House of Representatives seat of Makin in South Australia since the 2007 election.

== Early life ==
Born in Platì, Italy, as a child Zappia moved with his family to Pooraka, where he attended primary school and Enfield High School. From 1969 he worked for ANZ Bank. From 1976 to 1980, Zappia was employed as a research officer to Senator Jim Cavanagh. Zappia was Mayor of the City of Salisbury from 1997 to 2007 and a Councillor from 1977.

Zappia has run three fitness centres. Zappia has also won ten National Championships in powerlifting.

== Parliament ==
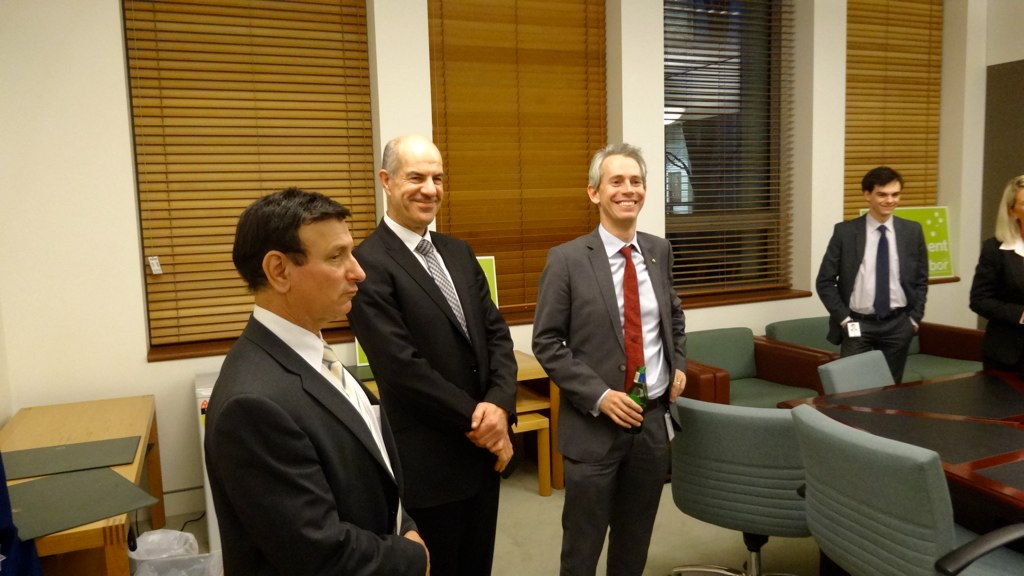
Zappia with Kelvin Thomson (centre) and Andrew Giles (right) in Parliament house in 2014

From Makin's creation ahead of the 1984 election, the seat was always marginal and held by the party of government, often typical of mortgage belt seats. However, Zappia defeated Liberal candidate Bob Day at the 2007 election with a 57.7 percent two-party vote from an 8.6-point two-party swing as Labor won government, the largest two-party vote and swing of any party in Makin's history at the time, and was also the first time a Makin candidate won a majority of the primary vote. At the 2010 election, Zappia technically made it a safe Labor seat with a 62.2 percent two-party vote, again becoming the largest of any party in Makin's history. Zappia held the seat at the 2013 election with a reduced 55.1 percent two-party vote even as Labor lost government, albeit still the largest two-party vote, aside from 2010 and 2007, of any party in Makin's history. No longer a bellwether for the first time, Zappia became the first opposition member in the seat's history.

In September 2023, Zappia joined a cross-party delegation of Australian MPs to Washington, D.C., to lobby the U.S. Department of Justice to abandon its attempts to extradite Australian publisher Julian Assange from the United Kingdom. The other members were Alex Antic, Barnaby Joyce, Monique Ryan, David Shoebridge, and Peter Whish-Wilson.

== Personal life ==
Zappia lives in Pooraka with his wife Vicki and has three children.

Parliament of Australia
Preceded by Trish Draper	Member for Makin; 2007–present	Incumbent
Civic offices
Preceded by David Plumridge	Mayor of the City of Salisbury; 1997 – 2007	Succeeded by Gillian Aldridge
