= City of Salisbury =

Local government area of Adelaide

- Local government area
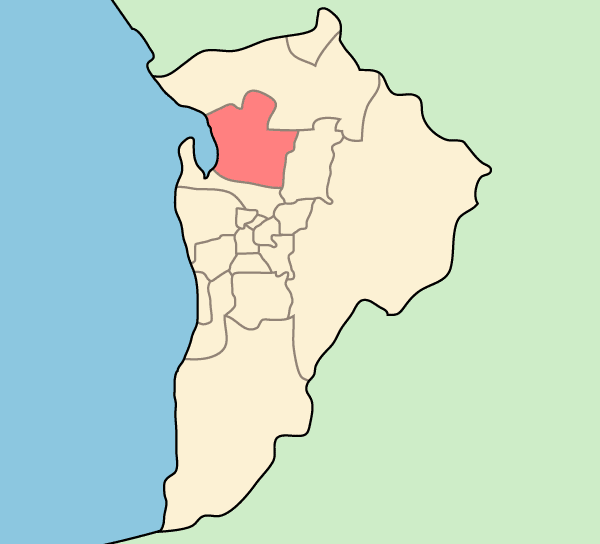

- Interactive map of City of Salisbury
- Coordinates: 34.7673°S 138.5857°E
- Country: Australia
- State: South Australia
- Region: Northern Adelaide
- Established: 6 July 1964

Government
  - Mayor: Gillian Aldridge
  - State electorate: Ramsay, King, Wright, Florey, Playford, Taylor
  - Federal divisions: Spence; Makin

Area
  - Total: 158.1 km^{2} (61.0 sq mi)

Population
  - Total: 145,806 (LGA 2021)
  - Density: 922.24/km^{2} (2,388.6/sq mi)
- Website: City of Salisbury
LGAs around City of Salisbury
City of Playford
City of Salisbury	City of Tea Tree Gully
City of Port Adelaide Enfield

The City of Salisbury is a local government area (LGA) located in the northern suburbs of Adelaide, South Australia. Its neighbours are the City of Playford, City of Tea Tree Gully and City of Port Adelaide Enfield.

Encompassing an area of 158 square kilometres (61 square miles), the city is one of the most populous and fast-growing council areas in South Australia: the local government area's population in 2021, of 145,806, was an increase of 32% over the 2001 population of 110,676 and of 13% over the 2011 population of 129,109.

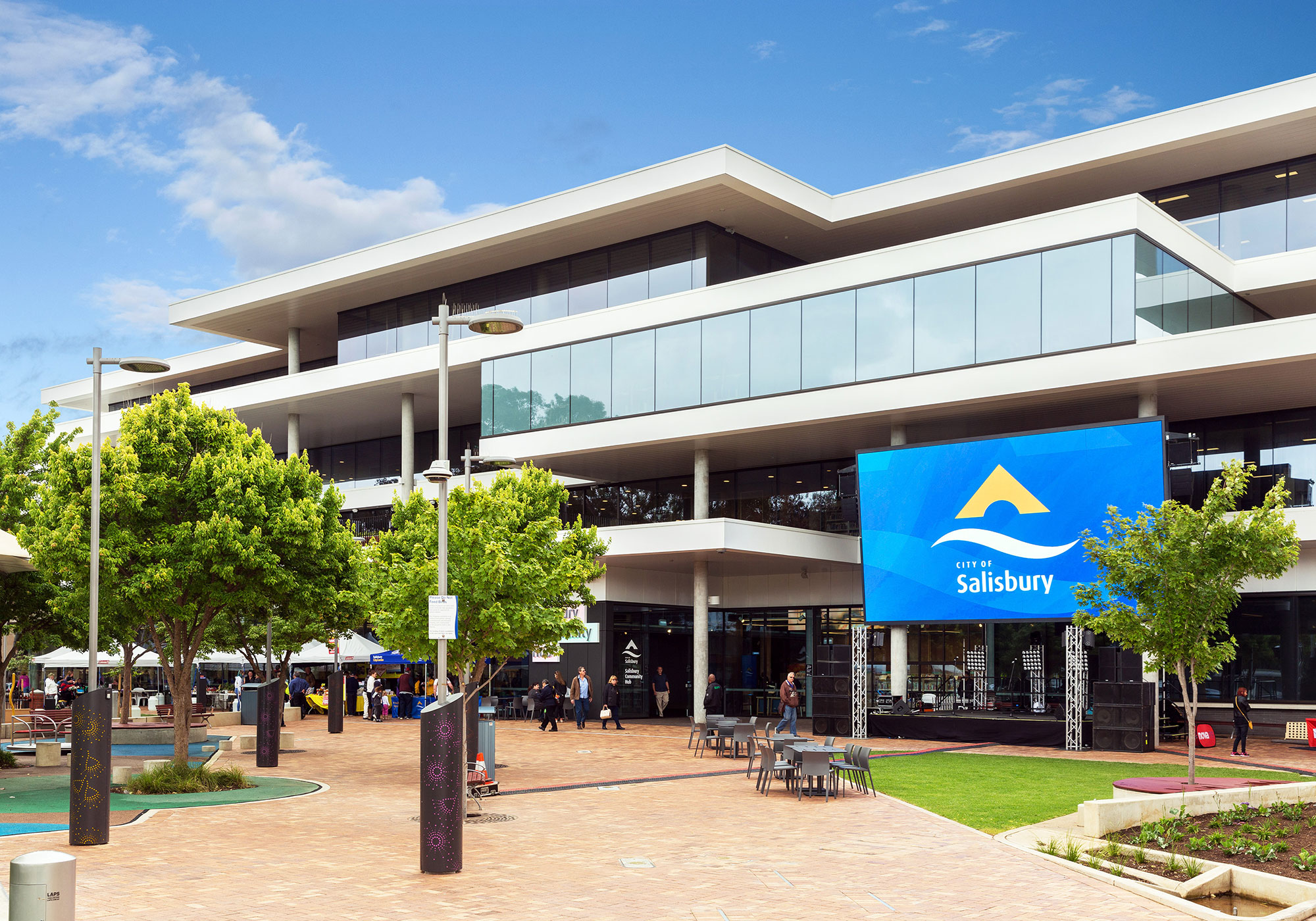
The City of Salisbury offices and the collocated community hub

The Local Government Area's main town centre – Salisbury City Centre – is on the main street of the town of Salisbury, John Street. The centre also hosts the council's principal office, council chambers and library, on Church Street. There is also a centre at Mawson Lakes, a master-planned development that surrounds the large Sir Douglas Mawson Lake.

== History ==
For millennia, the Aboriginal Kaurna people were custodians of the Adelaide Plains, including the Salisbury area.

The township of Salisbury was laid out by John Harvey, who had migrated from Scotland in 1839. He named it after the Salisbury Plain in Wiltshire, near where his wife was born. Harvey purchased land beside the Little Para River in 1847 and in the following year sold allotments in the town. It became a service centre for surrounding farms and by 1881 the population was close to 500. Harvey's African heritage has often been ignored in South Australia's history, and the council website has not yet acknowledged that history, which Mayor Gillian Aldridge has said is needed.

The District Council of Salisbury was formed in 1933 by an amalgamation of parts of the abolished District Council of Munno Para West and the District Council of Yatala North. The population of the township at incorporation was 2385, but almost doubled from 1940 when the federal government built a munitions factory at Penfield, reaching 4160 by 1947.

The town council was briefly renamed the District Council of Salisbury and Elizabeth in August 1963, but reverted to its former name after the Elizabeth area was severed to form the new town of Elizabeth in February 1964.

City status was granted as the City of Salisbury on 6 July 1964.

== Culture and events ==
Since 2005, the annual Salisbury Writers' Festival has been held in the city, co-hosted by the City of Salisbury, Writers SA and the Salisbury Library Service.

The city has many recreational facilities and parks. The large St Kilda adventure playground, with its wheelchair-accessible picnic settings, barbecues, shaded area, toilets and parking, is very popular: there is a huge castle with slides and a draw bridge, a bouncy boomerang, flying fox, pirate ship, a large "volcano" with multiple slides, swings and a basketball court. On the afternoons of most Sundays and public holidays, the nearby tramway museum displays all types of trams that operated in Adelaide and has unlimited tram rides included with admission. The St Kilda Mangrove Trail and Interpretive Centre includes an elevated walkway over a flooded mangrove forest that meanders through tidal salt marshes, mangroves and sea grass channels to a lookout that has scenic views across the Barker Inlet.

In 2025, Salisbury was accredited as a Welcoming City at the 'excelling' level, the second local government in Australia to do so. The Welcoming Cities framework is intended to promote diversity, multiculturalism and social cohesion.

== Sister City ==
The City of Salisbury has a sister cities relationship with:
Mobara, Japan (since May 2002)

Mobara Park in Mawson Lakes acknowledges their relationship.

A bronze statue in Mobara Park was gifted to the City of Salisbury by the City of Mobara, but it was stolen in 2023 when somebody used an angle grinder to cut through its ancles and removed the body, leaving only the feet. Mayor Gillian Aldridge described the incident as "the saddest thing that's happened since I've been mayor". The artwork was titled Nakayoshi, meaning "close friend".

== Salisbury Community Hub ==
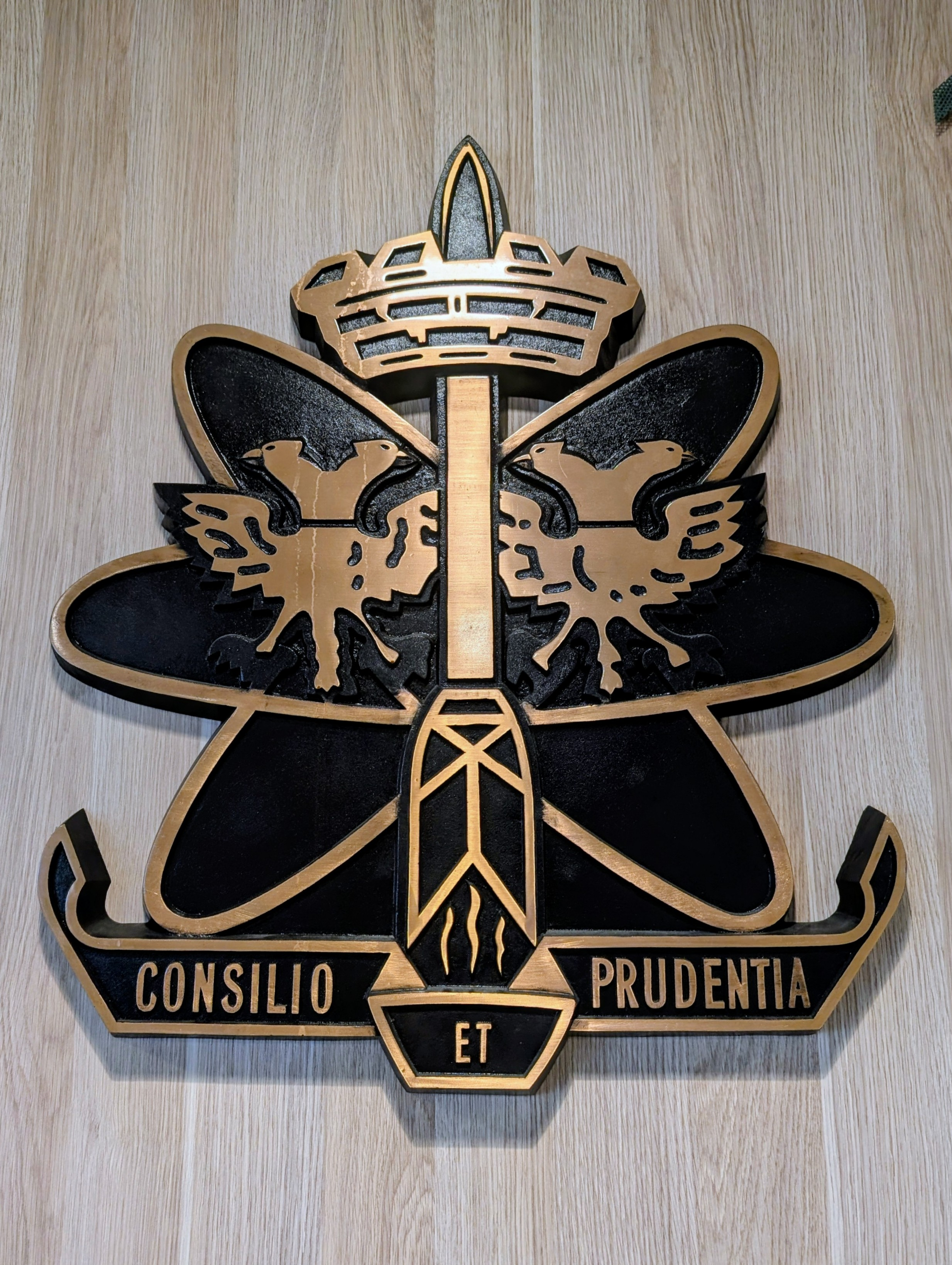
Salisbury city coat of arms

Council offices and council chambers are housed in the multipurpose Salisbury Community Hub, which includes civic spaces, a gallery, library and a cafe. The Salisbury Community Hub was opened in November 2019. It was built at a cost of $43,000,000. The building has received multiple architecture awards, including the Australian Institute of Architects' Jack McConnell Award for Public Architecture for 2020.

== Councillors ==
Council consists of 15 elected members comprising a mayor, and 14 ward councillors. The Council area is divided into seven wards, with two councillors elected from each ward.

Elections were last held in 2022 to cover the period to 2026. The voter participation rate was 26.9%. The city's Mayor and councillors as of July 2023 (after removal of two councillors) were:

Ward	Party Affiliation	Councillor	First elected	Notes
Mayor	Labor	Gillian Aldridge OAM	1988	
Central	Labor	Chad Buchanan		Deputy Mayor
Central	Vacant		2022	Severina Burner (Trumpet of Patriots) was removed from office at a special meeting of the council in June 2023 on account of non-attendance.
East	Independent	Johnny Chewparsad	2022	
East	Independent	Moni Mazzeo	2022	
South	Labor	Lauren Brug	2022	
South	Independent	Alan Graham	2022	
Hills	Labor	Peter Jensen		
Hills	Independent	Shiralee Reardon		
Para	Independent	Kylie Grenfell		
Para	Labor	Sarah Ouk		
North	Labor	David Hood		
North	Vacant		2022	Grace Bawden (independent) was removed from office at a special meeting of the council in June 2023 on account of non-attendance.
West	Labor	Beau Brug		
West	Independent	Sharon McKell	2022	

== Council chairpersons/mayors of Salisbury ==
Council chairpersons/mayors since 1933 have been as follows: (Note: Citation does not apply to Cr Griffiths, 1933–34.)

Years	Chairperson/Mayor
1933–1934	Henry John Wynter Griffiths
1934–1935	Harold Lockheart Martin
1935–1939	Arnold Godfrey Jenkins
1939–1942	Harold Lockheart Martin
1942–1953	Andrew Thomas Goodall
1953–1955	Leslie Paul McIntyre
1955–1957	Keith Neil Davis
1957–1961	Harry Lyle Bowey
1961	Stewart Lynn Gilchrist
1962–1965	John Lawrence Lindblom
1965–1978	Harry Lyle Bowey
1978–1983	Ronald Thomas White
1983–1987	David Allen Plumridge
1987–1993	Patricia St Clair-Dixon
1993–1997	David Allen Plumridge
1997–2007	Tony Zappia
2008–	Gillian Aldridge

== Smart cities controversy ==
In 2023, Salisbury Council developed a proposal for a 'smart cities' initiative, to "improve the quality of life of residents", including increased safety. The proposal was met with community backlash, including comparisons to concentration camps, flyers distributed to residents to "stop Big Brother technologies" and resist the introduction of "total surveillance across the local government area", and calls for protest. The flyers included links of videos featuring South Australian Liberal senator Alex Antic, who denied having any involvement with the flyers. The meeting scheduled to discuss the initiative attracted 100 protesters and the venue lost power, along with 1,200 other properties, so was rescheduled. Protesters at council meetings were also criticised by SA Police for diverting resources from fighting crime. At the subsequent meeting, deputy mayor, Chad Buchanan said the council needed to go on the record to dispel misinformation and passed a motion to confirm "for the avoidance of any doubt" that the council was not engaging in a range of conspiracies including installing smart technology "on behalf of powerful globalist bankers that have infiltrated all councils", that the council will not support 5g towers to be used to "kill or maim people", and that the council is not aware of a microchip that Elon Musk had developed which would mind control the community. The council also decided that the Mayor, Gillian Aldridge, would write to Elon Musk about the claims.

== Drag Storytime Event ==
In 2024, the City of Salisbury planned a Drag Storytime event for children at the Salisbury Community Hub. There were many community complaints and criticism from South Australian One Nation MLC, Sarah Game. The Salisbury Community Hub went into lockdown due to several threats and the Star Force was called. The event proceeded, with protesters shouting homophobic abuse at parents and children as they attended. Mayor Gillian Aldrige described those who attended as "amazingly strong, wonderful people". The building remained in lockdown after the event and the performer required to stay in the building until it was safe.

== See also ==
- Local Government Areas of South Australia
- List of Adelaide suburbs
- List of Adelaide parks and gardens
