= Advanced Technology Centre Shah Alam =

Vocational college in Malaysia

ADTEC Shah Alam
- Type: Public
- Established: 2003
- Affiliations: ADTEC, JTM
- Director: Ts Hajah Zuraini Binti Muda
- Faculty: ~100
- Students: 400
- Location: Kota Kemuning, Selangor, Malaysia; 3.0110°N 101.5101°E
- Website: www.adtecsa.gov.my/index.php

Advanced Technology Centre Shah Alam, also known as ADTECSA or ADTEC Shah Alam, is a public vocational college in Kota Kemuning suburb, in Shah Alam, Malaysia. It was founded in 2001 by the Jabatan Tenaga Manusia (JTM), and inaugurated by then Prime Minister Abdullah Ahmad Badawi in 2003. It is one of eight ADTECs in Malaysia. As of 2023, it offers nine full-time courses. It is the first and only government ran TVET training institution to have the Aircraft Maintenance Course throughout Malaysia.

== History ==
Established in 2001 by the Department of Manpower (JTM), ADTEC Shah Alam is one of Malaysia's high-technology training institutions aimed at developing a skilled and competent workforce in support of the government's aim for Malaysia to become a developed country by 2020. The institution was built under the Seventh Malaysia Plan (RMK-7) on a 40-acre site in the Bukit Kemuning industrial area, with construction completed by 2000. Teaching began in July 2001 with the first intake of 107 students. The centre was formally inaugurated by then Prime Minister Y.A.B. Dato' Seri Abdullah bin Hj. Ahmad Badawi on January 11, 2003.

In 2006, aircraft maintenance was introduced as the ninth field of training, in collaboration with the National Aerospace and Defense Industries (NADI), to meet the growing demand for skilled manpower in the aviation sector. In July 2011, this certificate program was upgraded to a Diploma in Aircraft Maintenance Technology.

Through the Malaysia-Japan Automotive Industry Co-Operation Program (MAJAICO), JTM is responsible for handling the MAJAICO B project in collaboration with Nissan. MAJAICO is an initiative under the 2006 Malaysia-Japan Economic Cooperation Agreement signed in July between the Ministry of Human Resources (KSM) and the Japan External Trade Organization (JETRO). The MAJAICO B project aims to train lecturers at learning institutions and to develop the skills of the current workforce. As of December 2018, 4,672 students have graduated from ADTEC Shah Alam. Qualifications include welding, machining (manufacturing), quality assurance, computer systems, refrigeration and air conditioning, mechatronics, electronics, power electronics, and aircraft maintenance. Graduates enter both the domestic and foreign industrial labour markets.

== Campus and facilities ==
ADTEC Shah Alam is organised in a block layout, comprising classrooms, workshops, and laboratories for both practical and computer-based subjects. Two on-site aircraft hangars support aviation-related training and house various aircraft, including the Sikorsky, Pilatus PC-7, and Skyhawk. Car assembly lines and associated workshop support mechatronics training.

In addition to learning facilities, the campus contains a main hall, dining hall, public surau, 300-seat auditorium, and a library. Sports facilities include fields and courts for rugby, basketball, volleyball, futsal, tennis, takraw, and badminton.

ADTEC provides three main accommodation blocks for students—two for male students and one for female students. Male students typically share rooms with two or three others. The accommodation includes televisions, satellite TV service, washing machines, water coolers, heaters, and study rooms. Wi-Fi is provided. Accommodation for lecturers, staff, guests, and the director of the college is also provided.

On-campus transportation includes buses, lorries, vans, and cars.

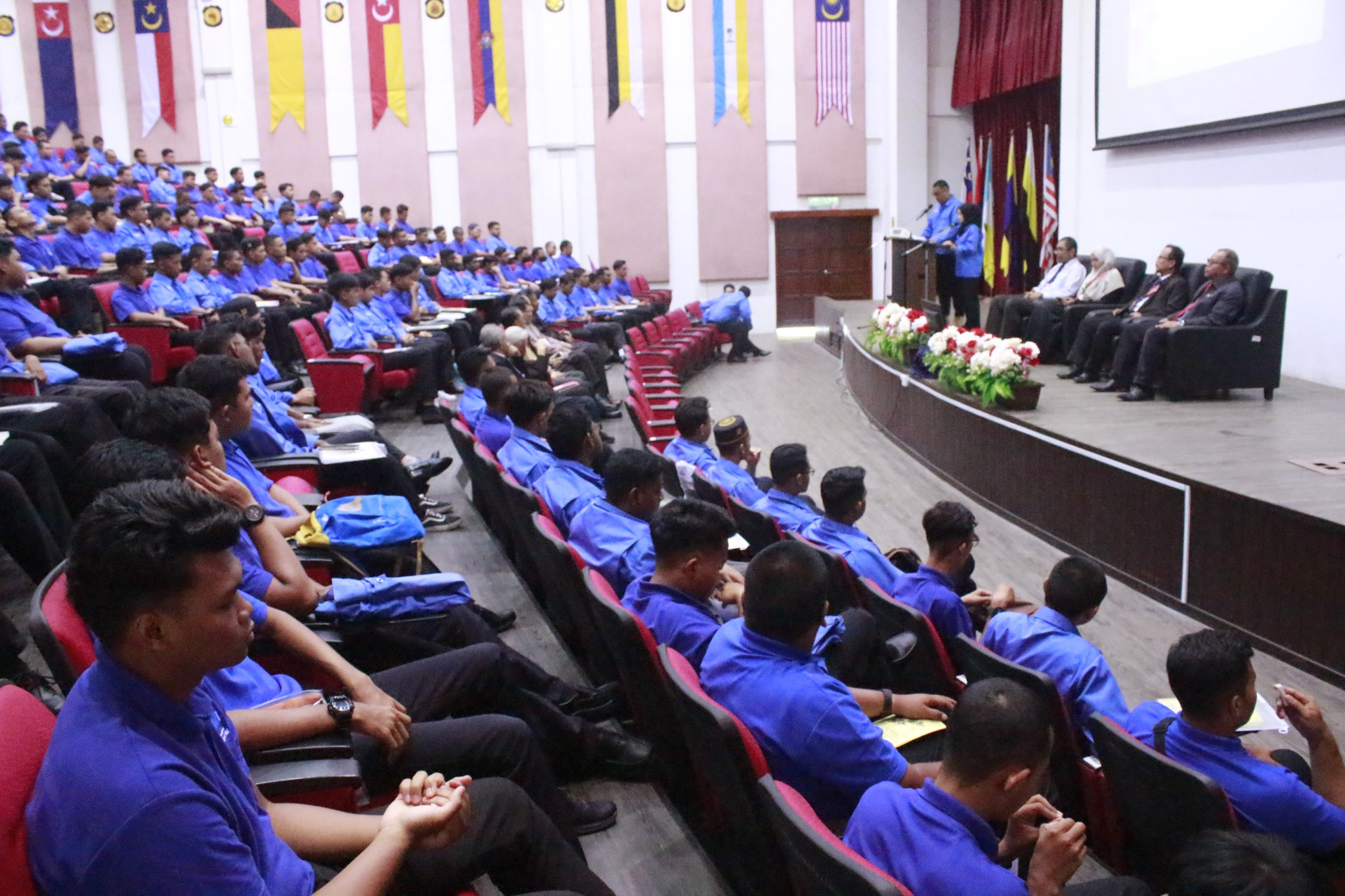
The auditorium

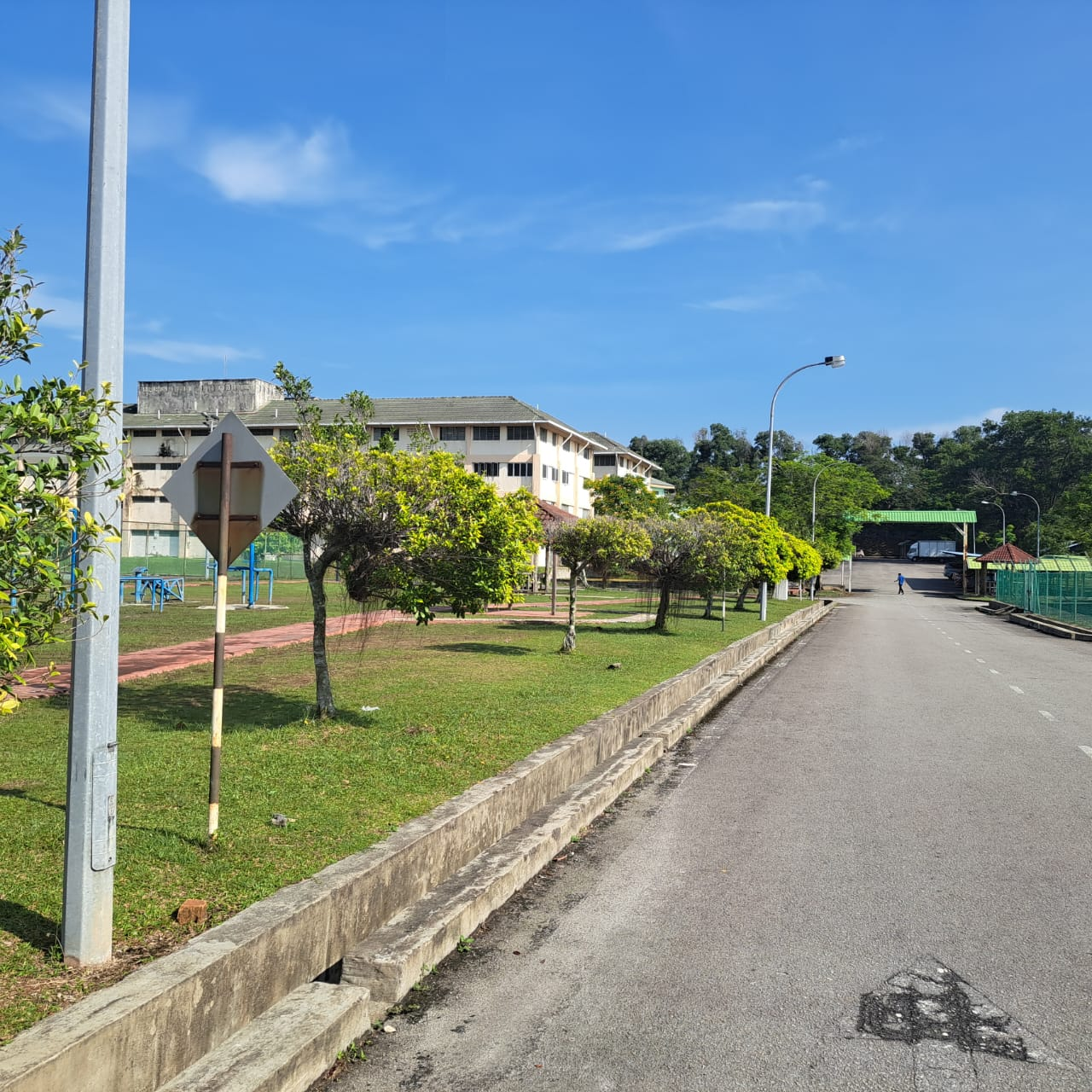
The dormitories

== Training ==
=== Courses ===
The main faculties at ADTEC Shah Alam are mechanics, servicing, electronics, and machining, with a curriculum bias of about 30–40% theory to 60–70% practical. General subjects are also offered; these include mathematics, science, English, ICT, CAD, and Islamic/moral studies. By offering these, ADTECSA aims to enhance the career potential of its students. The courses offered conform to the Malaysian Skills Certificate program (Diploma Kemahiran Malaysia).

Offered courses include:

1. Diploma in Aircraft Maintenance Technology
2. Diploma in Quality Assurance
3. Diploma in Automotive Production
4. Diploma in Mechatronics
5. Diploma in Manufacturing Technology (Machining)
6. Diploma in Electrical Power Technology
7. Diploma in Quality Assurance
8. Diploma in Refrigeration & Air Conditioning
9. Diploma in Welding

The diploma is also referred to by the phrase Diploma Kejuruteraan Teknology (Diploma in Engineering and Technology), abbreviated to DTK.

The institute also provides short-term training programmes for non-students, including industry professionals, university lecturers, and members of the armed forces (typically from the Malaysian Air Force).

=== Certifications ===
A large demand exists within the Malaysian labour market for ADTECSA graduates. ADTECSA aims to prepares its students for the Industrial Revolution 4.0. Graduates receive certifications including the Level 3 Sijil Kemahiran Malaysia (SKM) and the Level 4 Diploma Kemahiran Malaysia (DKM), both issued by the Jabatan Pembangunan Kemahiran (JPK, or Skills Development Department). The awarding body for these certificates is part of the same ministry as JTM. These are among the highest standards in Malaysian vocational education. For example, ADTECSA is the only institute in Malaysia offering a three-in-one programme for aircraft maintenance—providing SKM, a diploma, and assistance with obtaining a CAAM license

=== Aircraft maintenance training ===
ADTEC Shah Alam's Aircraft Maintenance Engineering Technology program is a three-year diploma program designed to prepare individuals for a career in aircraft maintenance. The program adheres to the guidelines set forth by the Civil Aviation Authority Malaysia (CAAM) Part 66 Category A syllabus and covers a comprehensive range of topics, including airframe structures and systems, aircraft engines and systems, avionics, electrical systems, and aircraft maintenance documentation and procedures.

Students receive practical training in workshops and laboratories, industry placements and field visits to aircraft maintenance organizations.

Upon successful completion of the program, graduates are awarded a Diploma in Aircraft Maintenance Engineering Technology from ADTECSA and a Malaysian Skills Diploma, which is a joint award from the Department of Skill Development Malaysia and JTM. The institution also provides assistance for students to apply for the Aircraft Maintenance License (Technician Category A1/A2/A3/A4) in accordance with CAAM.

== Activities and students ==
The institute participates in skills and innovation competitions, such as PKM, CITEC, ITEX, and the WorldSkills Competition. Student activities also include sports, including rugby, tennis, volleyball, badminton, basketball, takraw, and futsal. The institute regularly conducts sporting events, such as inter-faculty tournaments and team selection competitions. Non-sport activities include charity runs, marching, and an orchestra.

=== Students Representative Council ===
Majlis Perwakilan Pelajar (Students Representative Council) of ADTECSA promotes student rights and acts as an intermediary between students and college administration. Representatives are elected by students each semester. The council, which is led by a diploma student, assists the institute in various areas.

=== Rivalry with ILPKL ===
A college rivalry exists between ADTECSA and ILPKL due to their close proximity. They compete in marching competitions, and sporting events.

=== Feedback ===
At the end of each semester, ADTECSA collects student feedback on lecturers, training equipment, accommodation, learning resources, syllabi, and other areas.

=== Graduates ===
ADTECSA provides assistance for postgraduates to find suitable employment.
