= AITC =

AITC may refer to:

- All India Trinamool Congress, a political party in West Bengal, India
- Allyl isothiocyanate, an organosulfur compound
- Australian Industry Trade College, Queensland, Australia
