= Australian Technical Colleges =

Australian trade school system (2005–2009)

- Australia

Information
- Type: Class of Australian senior Senior secondary school
- Established: 2005

Australian Technical Colleges (ATCs) were a class of Australian senior secondary school funded by the Australian federal government between 2005 and 2009. The Australian Technical College program ceased on 31 December 2009. All 24 ATCs were integrated into existing education and training systems (state/territory government, Catholic and Anglican), with some continuing as stand-alone independent schools.

They delivered vocational education courses to Year 11 and 12 students, predominantly 16 to 18-year-olds. Some colleges had a single campus, while others had multiple campuses.

== History ==
According to the Australian constitution, education is the responsibility of the state and territory governments; although the federal government does partially fund private schools, vocational and higher education. Vocational education funding however was previously funnelled through the states and territories. These colleges' direct federal funding is thus unusual for this reason alone. Their appearance was part of the breakdown of cooperative federalism caused by the increasing centralism of the Howard government and party-political differences with the state and territory governments. Another expression of this was the demise of the former Australian National Training Authority (ANTA) which expressed the political and industrial settlement on training of the 1990s.

In 2005, the federal government chose the areas in which these schools were to be established, then advertised for tenders. Some successful tenderers were state or territory governments, others were church groups, others were for-profit companies. Some were combinations of these. Thus some resulting ATCs were government schools, while others are private schools that are predominantly government funded, and at least one exists as a campus-within-a-campus at a state school and a church school. Such a mixed sectoral body of schools had not existed in Australia before, nor had any government founded a private school. Both these firsts also make the colleges unusual.

It is widely accepted that the concept was based on a model developed by Leo Donnelly Parish Priest of St Agnes Catholic Parish Port Macquarie NSW. Known as St Joseph's Vocational College, this specialist Vocational Education and Training (VET) school was opened in 1979 and had paved the way for effective integration of VET courses into the inflexible NSW HSC curriculum. At the time The Hon Mark Vaile, Deputy Prime Minister, who was the local member for the area was credited as bringing the concept to the attention of the Prime Minister and Cabinet and the ATCs were created. Subsequently, St Joseph's Vocational College became the first and largest of the ATCs.

The program was shut down by the Rudd Government in 2008 in favour of the Trade Training Centre (TTC) scheme.

== List of former ATCs ==
As of November 2009 there were twenty-four Australian Technical Colleges throughout the country. These were:

New South Wales

- Hunter (now Hunter Trade College)
- Port Macquarie (now Newman Senior Technical College)
- Western Sydney (now Anglican Technical College – Western Sydney)
- Central Western NSW (now Central West Trade College)
- Central Coast (Gosford)
- Illawarra
- Queanbeyan

Northern Territory

- Darwin

Queensland

- Gladstone
- Gold Coast (now Australian Industry Trade College – Robina)
- North Brisbane (now Australian Trade College North Brisbane)
- North Queensland (Townsville)
- Australian Technology and Trade College

South Australia

- Northern Adelaide (now St Patrick's Technical College)
- Adelaide South (now Marcellin Technical College)
- Spencer Gulf and Outback (Port Augusta/Whyalla)

Tasmania

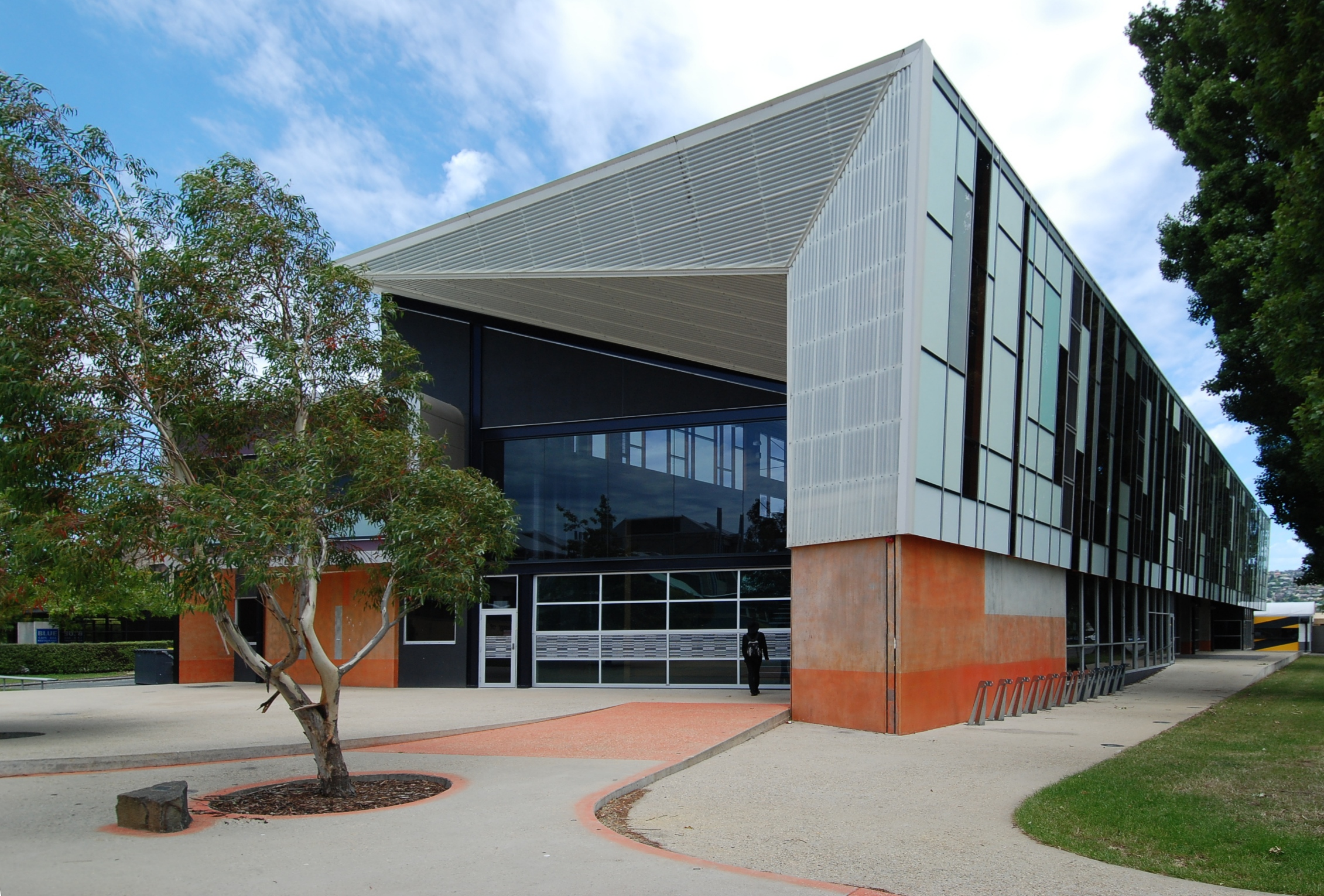
ATC Launceston, Tasmania

- Northern Tasmania

Victoria

- Gippsland (Bairnsdale/Sale)
- Geelong
- Bendigo
- Eastern Melbourne
- Sunshine
- Wannon

Western Australia

- Perth South
- Pilbara

== See also ==
- Apprenticeship
- Technical and Further Education (TAFE)
- Vocational education
