= Skills Passport =

Skills Passport is an electronic document developed by WorldSkills Russia, which confirms the level of proficiency in professional skills in accordance with the national and world standards of WorldSkills.

Skills Passport reflects the overall result of an independent assessment of skills using the WorldSkills methodology and allows you to understand in detail the strengths and weaknesses of the participant, what he already knows well, and what else needs to be learned to do to become a qualified specialist in a particular profession or specialty. The assessment is carried out in the form of a demonstration exam (a tool for independent assessment of skills) and, due to its large practical orientation, can only be carried out by educational organizations that have passed special accreditation to conduct such an exam in a specific skill or profession / specialty. Accreditation of an educational organization confirms the presence of a modern material and technical base (modern means of production or rendering of services).

From the point of view of the employer, the Skills Passport reflects the individual level of skill in the context of performing various labor functions and can be used as a kind of industrial quality certificate of a specialist.

== History ==
The system for issuing Skills Passports based on the results of passing the demonstration exam was launched by WorldSkills Russia in 2017 for 73 skills in 26 constituent entities of the Russian Federation. In 2021, the system covers almost 160 skills and is implemented in 85 regions of the Russian Federation.

Skills Passport is issued based on the results of both international and national and local events according to WorldSkills Russia standards, including training with a final cut and qualification exams. Colleges and universities of the country, Russian and international enterprises and companies take part in the development of tasks.

In Russia, a Skill Passport is also issued based on the results of the intermediate and final state certification of students of educational organizations implementing secondary vocational education and higher education programs. In addition to the diploma on secondary vocational education, it gives the employer a detailed understanding of the skills of the graduate and allows you to select a specialist in accordance with the tasks most relevant to business, since this format is recognized by companies as an effective tool for recruiting personnel.

In addition, since 2019, within the framework of vocational training and additional vocational education programs implemented by the WorldSkills Russia Academy for various categories of citizens, the final certification is carried out in the form of a demonstration exam. To date, more than 150 thousand people have been trained and passed a demonstration exam in 174 skills.

About 650 Russian companies, including state corporations, have recognized a Skill Passport as a document confirming the level of skill possession. Among the Russian companies that recognize a Skill Passport are the state corporation Rosatom, UAC, 1C, Kuka, DMG Mori and others.

All participants of the WorldSkills Kazan 2019 World Championship received a Skills passport at the end of the competition.

Within the framework of the agreement on cooperation in the field of promoting employment of the population of the CIS member states dated 28 May 2021, an agreement was reached on the development of a system of mutual recognition of skills based on the results of an independent assessment using the WorldSkills method, including the issuance of a Skill Passport. In Uzbekistan, a Skill Passport is equated to a diploma of secondary vocational education. China plans to adopt the relevant experience. About 50 thousand Russian college students have passed demonstration exams according to WorldSkills Russia standards in 2 years.

In the United States, similar programs have been suggested to the U.S. Government by advanced technology consulting firms, such as DigitalViking.tech, for workforce development in relation to the technology industry. Digital Viking proposes the use of a Skills Passport program that would be leveraged to find highly skilled and qualified candidates for various roles within the tech industry for both the private and public sectors alike.
