= Institut Latihan Perindustrian Kuala Lumpur =

Coordinates: 3.0920585°N 101.6868246°E

- Motto: Perintis Tenaga Mahir Negara (Malay)
- Motto in English: National Skilled Workforce Pioneer
- Type: Public
- Established: 1964; 62 years ago
- Affiliations: ADTEC, JMTI
- Director: Mohd Raris bin Mohamed Yusof
- Academic staff: 200 (approximately)
- Students: 812
- Location: Kuchai Lama, Kuala Lumpur, Malaysia
- Campus: 13.7 acres (5.5 ha)
- Website: www.ilpkl.gov.my

Institut Latihan Perindustrian Kuala Lumpur (ILPKL; English: Industrial Training Institute of Kuala Lumpur), is a public vocational college situated in a 13.7-acre land in Kuchai Lama, suburb of Kuala Lumpur, Malaysia. Founded in 1964 under Jabatan Tenaga Manusia (Manpower Department), ILPKL is the oldest institute of technology in Malaysia. It is one of 32 Institut Latihan Jabatan Tenaga Manusia, ILJTM (Manpower Department Training Institutes). Today, ILPKL offers 11 courses and is able to accommodate 1100 students at one time.

== History ==
In 1957, Central Apprenticeship Board was formed by Kementerian Buroh (Ministry of Labour), currently known as Kementerian Sumber Manusia (Ministry of Human Resources) which mark the commencement of Malaysian vocational education standard. ILPKL was originally established to help high school graduates who failed to do well in academics to hone their skills in vocational trades. Six years later, in January 1963 construction process of ILPKL begins with a budget of RM 1.5 million and finish in May 1964. ILPKL, originally named Pusat Latehan Keusahawanan (Entrepreneurial Training Centre) was inaugurated on 9 March 1965 by Yang di-Pertuan Agong of that time, Raja Syed Harrun Putra ibni Syed Hassan Jamalullail. Ford Foundation as well as Asia Foundation contributed the books for the institute.

On 1 July 1965, ILPKL opened technic course for contractors. On 13–22 September 1976, ILPKL lecturers were trained in In Plant Training (Fluid Power) in Dikin Kogyo Co. Ltd, Osaka, Japan. ILPKL officers once again underwent training in Osaka, this time is High Skilled Machinist Course at Higashiyodagawa Advanced Vocational Training Centre.

There were Japanese lecturers from ILO and American lecturers from BISCO. The three first programmes taught at ILPKL are electrical, building construction and printing with infrastructures from Japan and Australia. ILPKL also have been visited by numerous VIPs and organizations in its history including Malaysia's first Prime Minister Tunku Abdul Rahman, second Prime Minister Abdul Razak Hussein, fourth Prime Minister Mahathir Mohamad, V. Manickavasagam and Datuk Richard Ho.

The government later realized that the country is lacked of skilled workers, and as a developing country, the need for more proficient tradesmen is crucial for country's growth and to eliminate the dependability on foreign workforces. The government is also trying to reflect advanced countries such as Germany and Japan where students who are good in academic pick vocational field as their career. This leads to renovation, upgrade and expansion of ILPKL.

=== List of directors ===
Here is a list of all ILPKL directors from 1965 to 2025:

1. Peru Mohamed bin Asan Mydin
2. Ibrahim Mohamad
3. Wan Seman bin Wan Ahmad
4. Rosti Saruwono
5. Amir bin Abdullah
6. How Chin Chong
7. Abdullah bin Ali
8. Syed Mohamad Noor bin Syed Ali
9. Nik Othman bin Daud
10. Mohd Hashimi bin Abd Hadi
11. Mohamad Manoj bin Jumidali
12. Eng. Kamaruzaman bin Hj Md. Ali BK, MMSET
13. Abd Halim bin Ali Mohammed
14. Mohd Raris bin Mohamed Yusof

== Campus and facilities ==
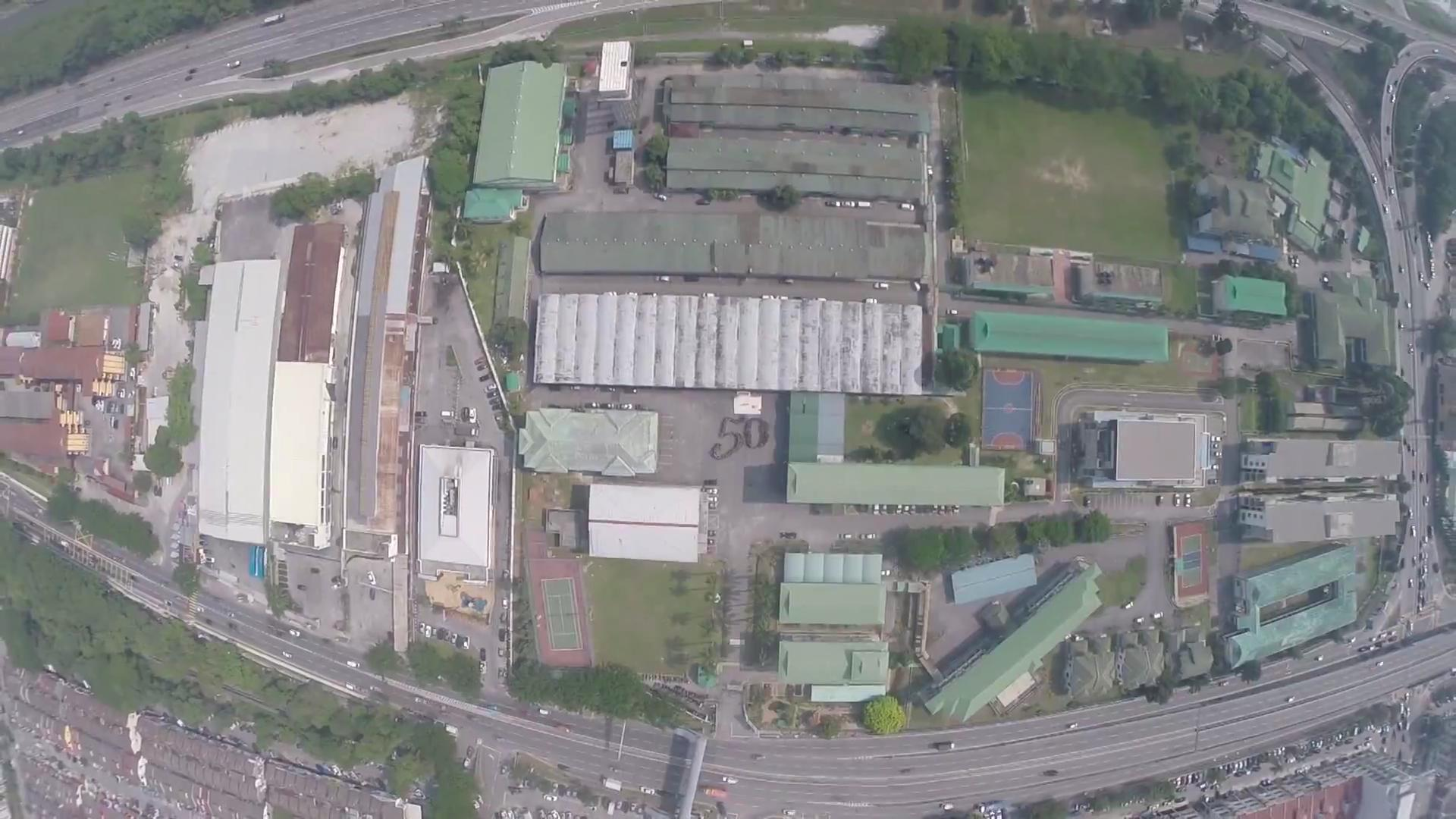
Aerial view of ILPKL campus.

ILPKL has over 30 blocks of buildings. Blocks of workshops and classrooms are separated. This is done to allow the students to concentrate without noises generated by power tools etc. in the workshops. The main academic building is next to the Bahagian Pengurusan Pelajar dan Latihan (Students and Training Management Department) block. It consists of three levels. Level 1 is where the computer laboratories for ICT and computer aided design subjects are situated. Level 2 is dedicated for common subjects faculty (physics, mathematics, English, Islamic studies) while level 3 is for the core subjects.

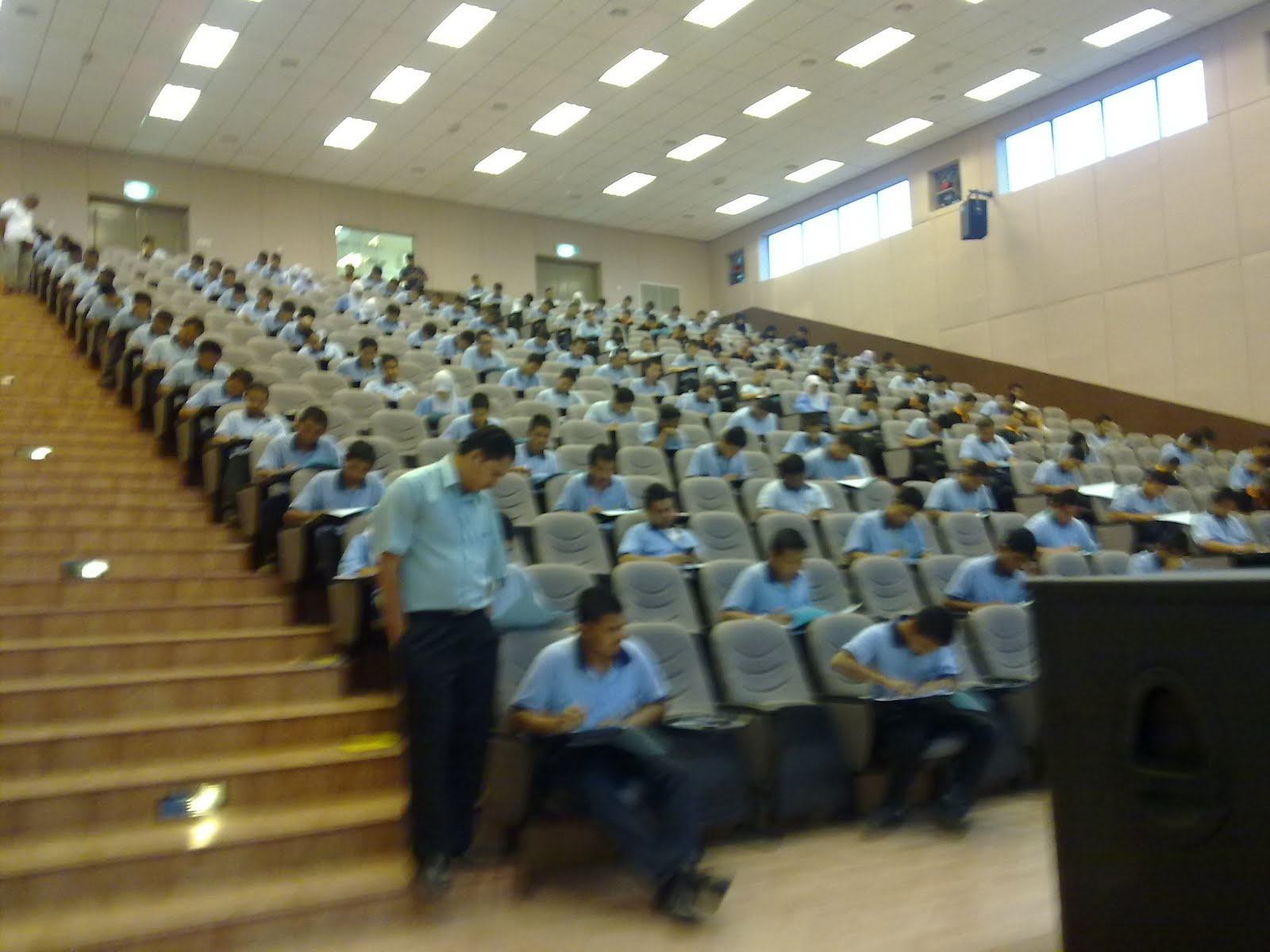
The auditorium.

The institute is well equipped with modern and sophisticated training facilities worth millions of Ringgits including a dynamometer machine, autotronic laboratory and imported vehicles for automotive department. A diesel calibration laboratory is also provided and rented by certain private college with an absence of such equipments. There is a main hall, computer laboratories, mosque which is opened to public, cafeteria, two-level dining hall, an auditorium with a capacity of 400, kiosk and library. Certain classrooms are also provided with air-conditioners.

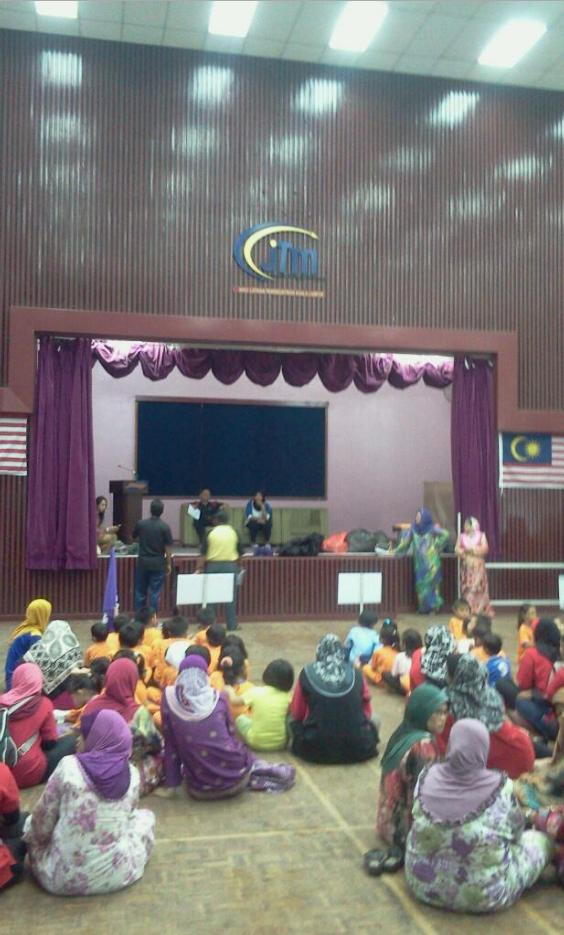
The main hall.

They also have well sports facilities such as soccer and netball fields, and courts for volleyball, futsal, tennis, takraw and badminton.

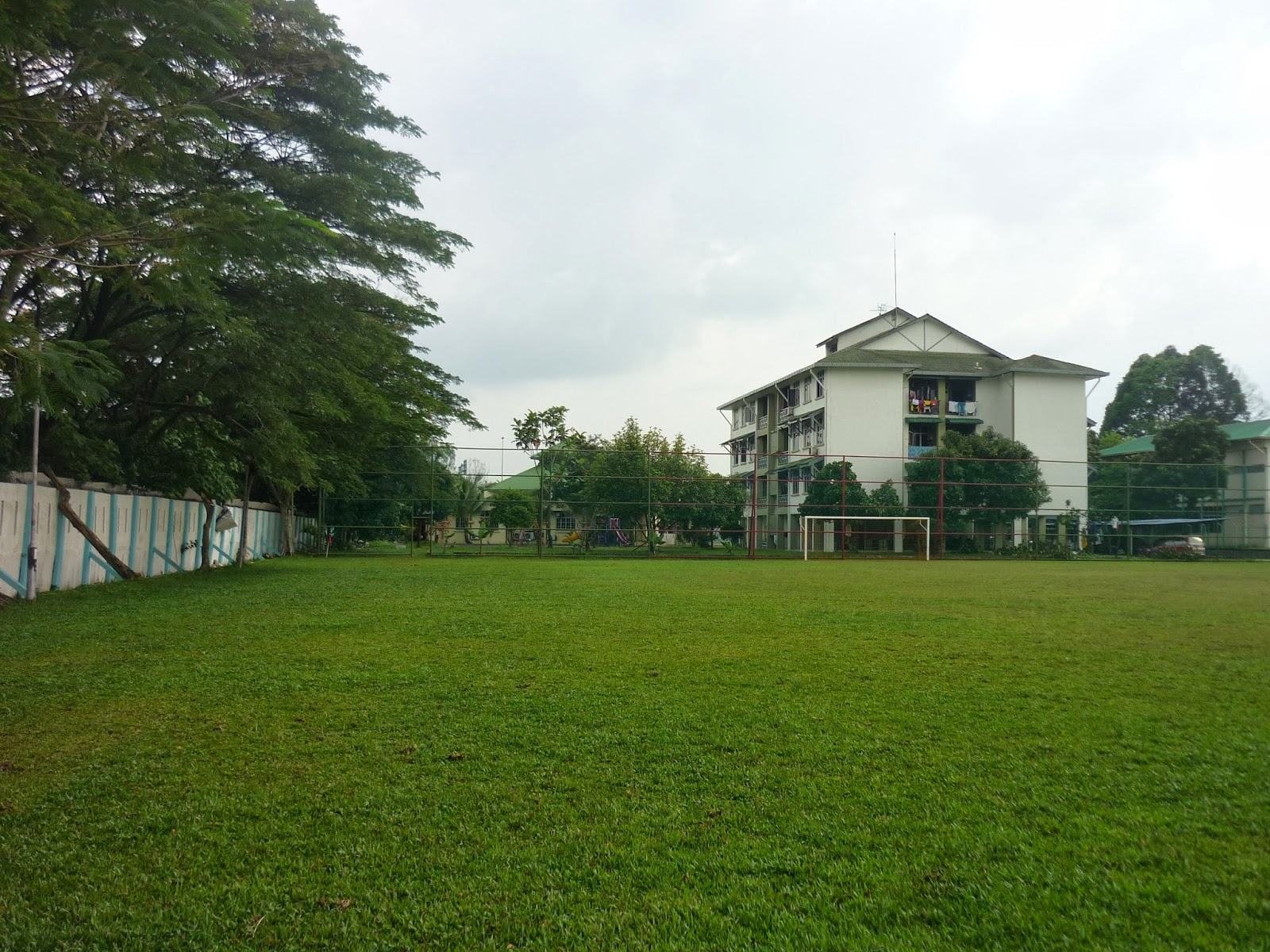
The soccer field.

== Training ==
=== Classes ===
There are several main faculties in ILPKL, including mechanical and servicing, electrical and electronics and machining. ILPKL curriculum bias is about 30 - 40% of theory and 60 - 70% of practical. Today, ILPKL includes general subjects: engineering mathematics and science, English, ICT, CAD and Islamic/moral studies, along with core subjects to provide the students with more career potential. Numerous courses are offered at ILPKL, and all of them emphasize technical fields.

1. Automotive Technology - DKM available
2. Electrical Technology - DKM available
3. Computer Technology (System) - DKM available
4. Industrial Electronics - DVM available
5. Arc and Gas Welding Technology
6. Graphic Technology
7. Prepress Technology
8. Printing Technology
9. Computer Numerical Control (CNC) Machining - DVM available
10. Quality Assurance Engineering - DVM available
11. Refrigeration and Air Conditioning
12. Industrial Mechanic
- DKM denotes courses with JPK's diploma level offered as optional.
- DVM denotes courses with diploma offered for four-year KV programmes.

ILPKL is providing short term classes too. They are for non-students such as professional workers in the industry and university lecturers who are looking for extra training. In 1999, ILPKL reach 369 participants of short term classes from 26 courses. They also frequently organizing educational events such as seminars on solar, network security and hybrid.

Training and other expenses including meals and accommodation is fully borne by the government provision. Monthly allowance is also paid to students.

=== Certifications ===
Technicians with certifications from ILPKL are the most pursued labors by companies in Malaysia. Certificates for ILPKL graduates including Sijil Kemahiran Malaysia, SKM (Malaysia Skills Certificate) level 2 or 3 depending on courses, but mostly level 3 and Diploma Kemahiran Malaysia, DKM (Malaysia Skills Diploma) which is optional and currently only available for three courses, both of which are issued by Jabatan Pembangunan Kemahiran, JPK (Skills Development Department) which is under the same ministry as JTM. They are the top certifications in Malaysian vocational education standard. The graduates will also be provided with Sijil Teknologi, ST (Technology Certificate) issued by Manpower Department which indicates that the person is a graduate of an ILJTM, which means he was trained by the best lecturers, infrastructures, and discipline. The ST is also a prove that engineering subjects such as mathematics, science, ICT and CAD were included in his syllabus.

ILPKL also offering courses of Diploma Vokasional Malaysia, DVM (Malaysia Vocational Diploma) issued by Kementerian Pelajaran (Ministry of Education) for kolej vokasional, KV (vocational college) students. ILPKL is the only institute in Malaysia which is issuing the full three-phase electrical wiring (PW4) certificate for level 3. For non-ILPKL graduates, they have to take the DKM (level 4) for another year, have a minimum working experience of two years, learn the same subjects again for six months, pay a fee to sit for the exam and have their certificate issued by Suruhanjaya Tenaga (Energy Commission). ILPKL also issuing Welder Qualification Test (WQT) license which approve a welder to weld in an oil rig. Since 2012, ILPKL obtain the 5S certification, a certification awarded to organizations conducting work in a clean, tidy and safe manner. 5S is a Japanese work ethic known as kaizen. ILPKL also received acknowledgement of MS ISO:9001.

ILPKL is frequently considered as a university for skill training when compared to other institutes such as vocational schools, Community Colleges and GIATMARAs. As of 2014, ILPKL introduce four-year kolej vokasional, KV (vocational college) programmes. The KV programme students will receive a DVM which is equivalent to a diploma from polytechnics upon their graduation. A collaboration with Samsung lead to the establishment of JTM-Samsung, with ILPKL being the first and currently the only institute under JTM with official facilities from Samsung. Industrial electronics students will receive a certificate from Samsung upon graduation as well as SKM. Future plans of ILPKL including to introduce international programme, E-Learning, executive diploma etc. in 2015–2016.

=== Automotive faculty ===
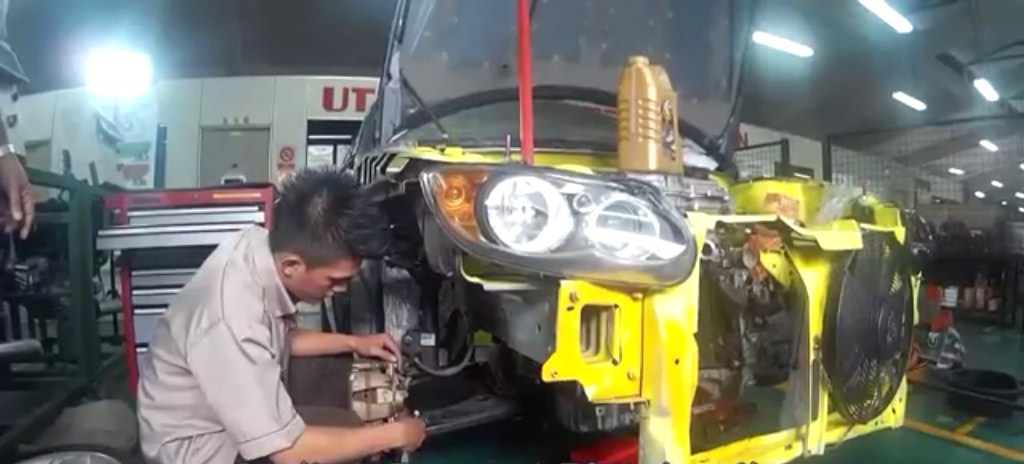
A student from automotive faculty working on a car used by ILPKL to compete in drag racing.

The first diploma level introduced in ILPKL is automotive. ILPKL is always giving prestige to automotive department by giving foremost attention to them and entering all automotive competition such as Pertandingan Kemahiran Malaysia, PKM (Malaysia Skills Competition), innovation competition and motor sports including drag racing and go-kart. The automotive department of ILPKL is also a three years consecutive gold winner in automotive category. They are looking forward to represent Malaysia in the 2015 World Skills Competition in Brazil. Their invention of anti-theft system also gained a gold at Polytechnic. Hence ILPKL is well known as the Centre of Excellence in Automotive, which is perpetuated at the main gate and their administration building, under the inauguration commemorative plaque.

== Activities and students ==
The institute is actively participating in skills and innovation competition including PKM, CITEC etc. Their industrial electronics department formed a robotic club and compete in Robot Challenge.

Students activities other than technical related are broad. The institute is regularly conducting sporting events, for instance the tournament between courses and player selection to represent institute. Other activities including charity run, marching, dance, choir, martial art and dikir barat.

=== The MSK ===
The infamous Minggu Suai Kenal (Orientation Week) of ILPKL is done twice a year. It is a tradition where the freshmen will be ragged with military style physical training for a week to see which students are really determined to study and to develop discipline and cooperation. They will be forced to strive in the forest, endure physical exercises without getting enough sleeps and abused with unkind words by the facilitators. The results are the disciplined and hardworking students.

=== Students Representative Council ===
Majlis Perwakilan Pelajar (Students Representative Council) of ILPKL strive for students rights and acting as a middle person between students and administration. They are voted by other students each semester, but the new rule require the council to last for a year. The council, led by a diploma student suggested some changes to the rules of institute in favor of the students, and some are granted by the director. They are also suggesting for some new facilities such as a gymnasium for students use.

=== Rivalry with ADTEC of Shah Alam ===
A college rivalry between ILPKL and Advanced Technology Training Centre (ADTEC) of Shah Alam is well known among students, given the location proximity between the two institutes. They compete in marching competitions and many athletic events as well as in training and innovation capabilities.
