= Australian Industry Trade College =

School in Queensland, Australia

Coordinates: 28.092°S 153.392°E

The Industry School
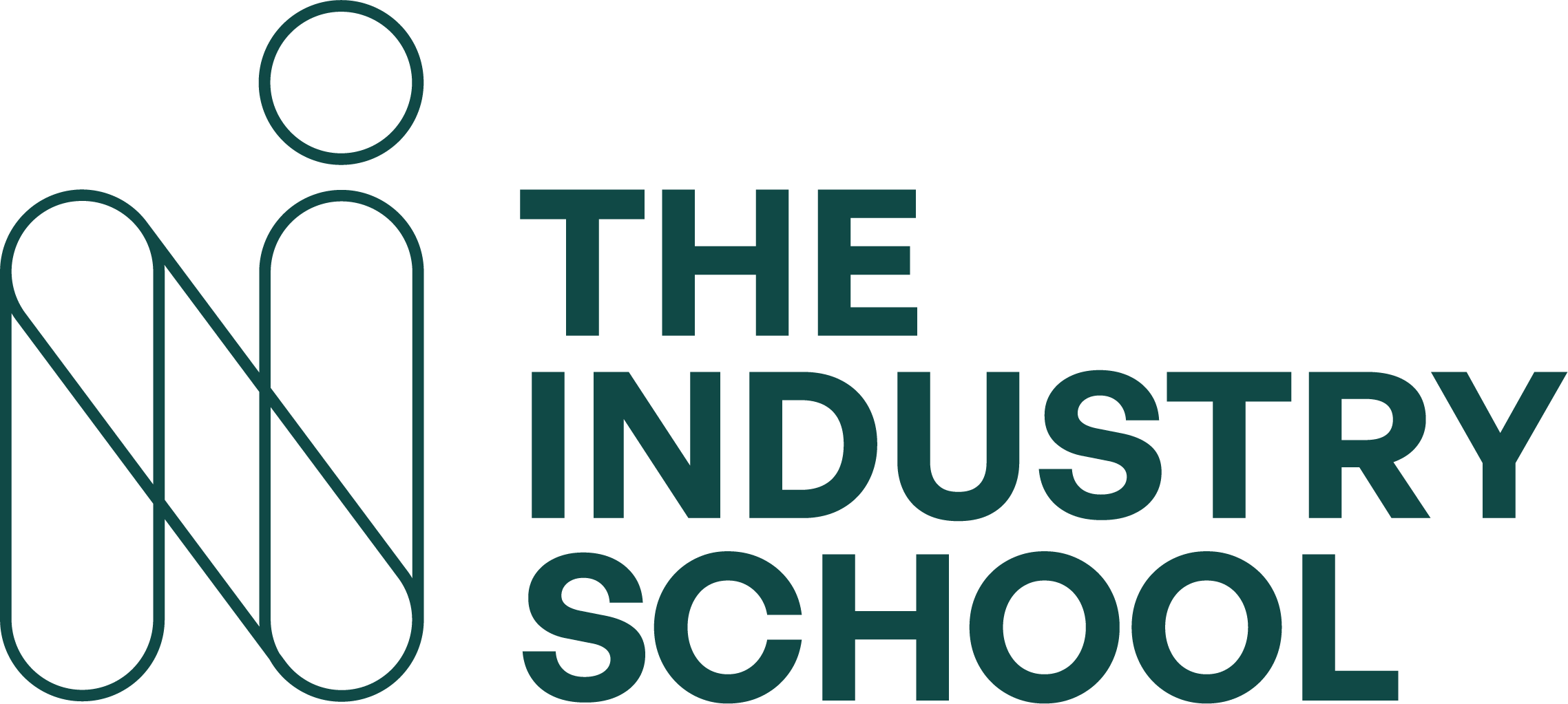
- South East Queensland, Australia, Queensland; Australia

Information
- Type: Independent, senior school, co-educational, industry education
- Motto: Deliberately Different.
- Established: 2006
- Chairman: Ric Roach
- Principal: Mark Hands | CEO (2006-2024) Lee Smith | CEO-elect (2025- )
- Grades: 10–12
- Enrolment: >1300
- Colours: Neon, Dark Green, Purple
- RTO: 31775
- Website: theindustryschool.com.au

The Industry School (formerly the Australian Industry Trade College (AITC)) - RTO 31775, is an independent, senior school for young people located at the Gold Coast, Redlands, Sunshine Coast, Toowoomba, Ipswich and Brisbane, in Queensland, Australia. Students in Years 10, 11 and 12 undertake a deliberately different education where they immerse in industry, gain vocational qualifications and complete their Queensland Certificate of Education, all while at school.

Established in 2006 by industry leaders, the School's unique model enables young people up to 28 weeks a year in industry, training or work experience, and 20 weeks a year in education.

By 2011, the industry-driven school had transitioned to the Australian Industry Trade College with a purpose-built campus on Scottsdale Drive, Robina. It then scaled to open schools in Redlands (2016), Sunshine Coast (2018), Toowoomba (2019), Ipswich (2020), and Brisbane (2022).

The Industry School is a not for profit company governed by a board of directors appointed from a broad range of industries. The School is accredited by the Non State Schools Accreditation Board and is a registered training organisation, governed by the Australian Skills Quality Authority.

The deliberately different school has a selective enrolment policy, with approximately 1280 students enrolled in Years 10, 11 and Year 12.

== History ==
The Industry School started as the Australian Industry Trade College in 2008 prior to the demise of the 24 Government funded Australian Technical Colleges (vocational education institutions), which officially ceased to operate in December 2009.

According to CEO, Mark Hands, in essence the School became "an independent senior school with a trade focus". In 2024, the independent school rebranded to be The Industry School. Industry partnerships are the cornerstone of the School, having had close working relationships with the likes of TAFE Queensland, Boating Industry Association, Heavy Vehicle Industry Association, Racing Queensland, Master Plumbers Queensland, Master Builders Australia, MEGT, and Bosch.

== Curriculum ==
The Industry School focusses on developing character and values, academic and enterprise skills, employability skills and industry readiness. The program engages young people in purposeful learning experiences with real world industry relevance, whilst meeting the requirements of the Queensland Curriculum and Assessment Authority. Students attend the School in 5-week blocks and are placed in work experience, work placement and school-based apprenticeships for 5–7 weeks during the remainder of the school term.

The Federal Member for McPherson, Karen Andrews, said in the House of Representatives on 17 August 2011 that "The AITC also has a unique style of teaching and working with students".

Students are encouraged to participate in service projects, both local and international. Every year, a team of young people, staff and industry partners, travels to Cambodia to build homes and shelter for underprivileged Cambodian families. The first overseas trip commenced in 2013, in partnership with New Hope Cambodia.

The Industry School is more than a trade college, offering extensive industry pathways, non-traditional trades, and Academy programs. For more than 15 years, The Industry School has produced great results - which is why it's a school of first for industry education.

== Student awards ==
- The Educator Schools of Excellence
- Queensland Master Builders Apprentice of the Year
- Construction Skills Queensland Apprentice of the Year
- Master Plumbers School-based Apprentice of the Year
- Queensland Training Awards Regional Finalist
- Australian Defence Force Long Tan Leadership Awards
- Australian Student Vocational Prize Winners
