= WorldSkills =

Biennial global vocational competition

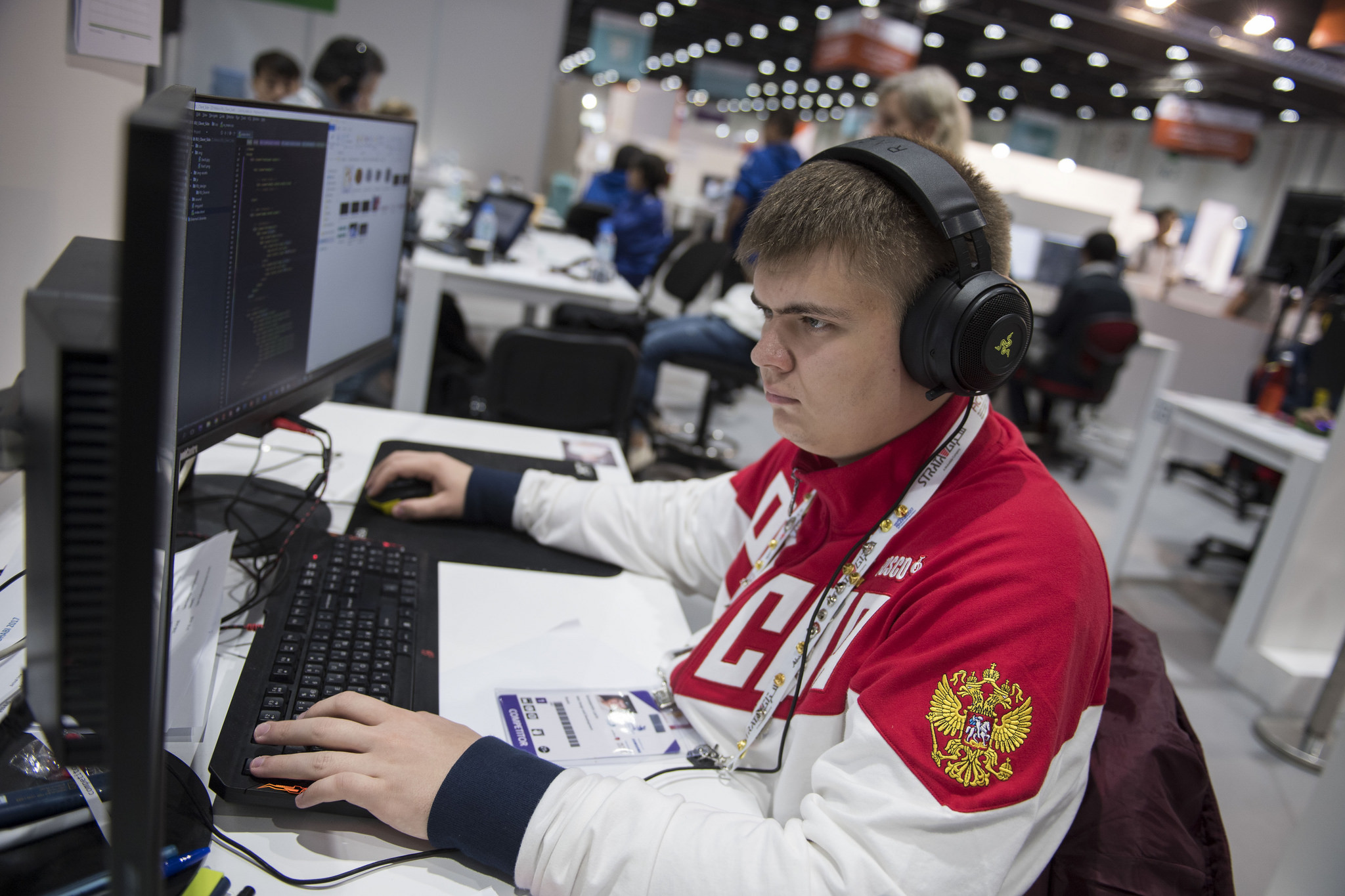
A web design competitor at WorldSkills Abu Dhabi 2017

WorldSkills is an international charity that organises world, regional and national championships for vocational skills and also hosts conferences about vocational skills. WorldSkills describes itself as the global hub for skills. WorldSkills International operates in 85 countries and regions.

The global Worldskills Championships (formerly the International Vocational Training Competition, known as the International Youth Skills Olympics in the United States) are held every two years. Their aims include publicising important vocational skills and encouraging 'parity of esteem' between vocational and academic qualifications.

== History ==
The International Vocational Training Organization (IVTO) was founded in the 1940s with the goal of creating new employment opportunities for young people in some of the economies that were devastated by the Second World War. After a national competition in 1947 in Spain, the first international competition was held there in 1950. This included only Spain and Portugal; in 1953, entrants representing France, Germany, Morocco, Switzerland and the United Kingdom also competed, and by 1970, 13 countries were participating, including Japan and Korea. The organization became WorldSkills International in 2000.

== WorldSkills Competitions ==
After initially taking place almost every year, the world championships, known as the WorldSkills Competitions, are now held every two years. Because of the COVID-19 pandemic, WorldSkills Shanghai 2022, initially scheduled for 2021, was first postponed and then replaced by WorldSkills Competition 2022 Special Edition, whose events were distributed between 15 countries.

Steelworking, Duisburg, 1961

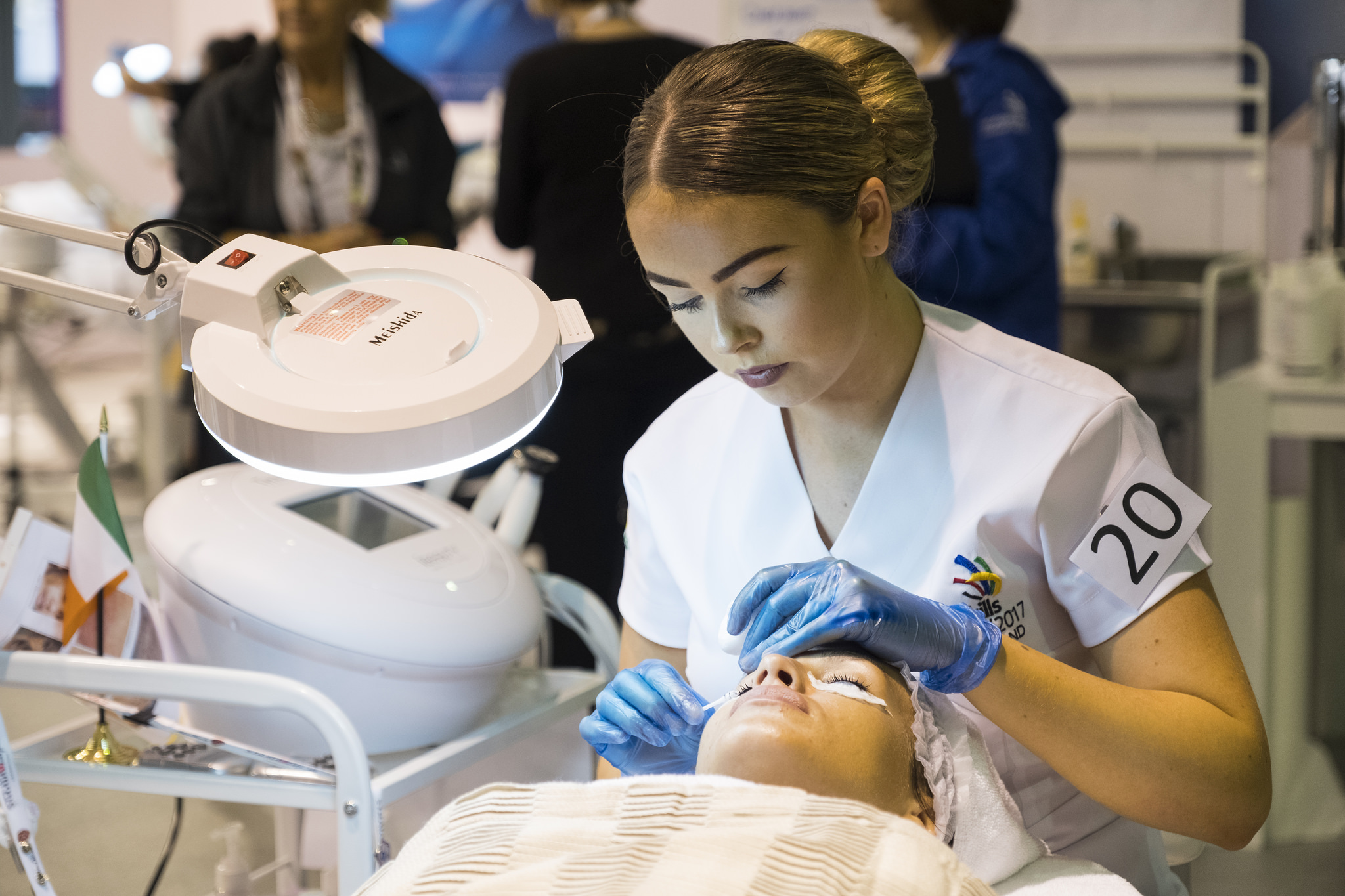
Applied aesthetics, Abu Dhabi, 2017

Landscape gardening, Tallinn, 2022

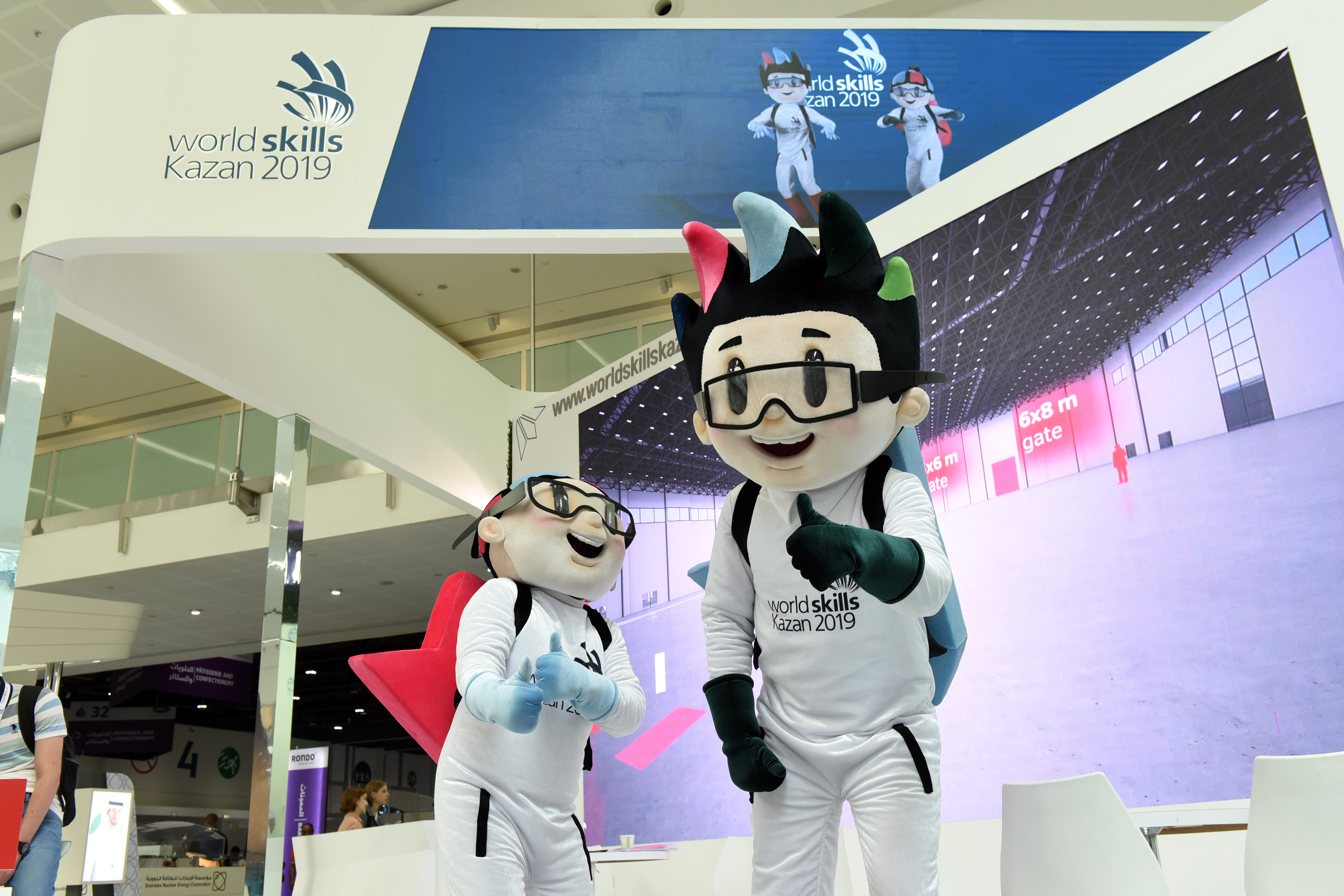
Mascots, Kazan, 2019

Edition	Year	Host city	Country	Skills	Countries
As International Vocational Training Organization (IVTO)
1	1950	Madrid	Spain		2
2	1951	Madrid	Spain		2
3	1953	Madrid	Spain		7
4	1955	Madrid	Spain		
5	1956	Madrid	Spain		
6	1957	Madrid	Spain		
7	1958	Brussels	Belgium		
8	1959	Modena	Italy		
9	1960	Barcelona	Spain		
10	1961	Duisburg	West Germany		
11	1962	Gijón	Spain		
12	1963	Dublin	Ireland		
13	1964	Lisbon	Portugal		
14	1965	Glasgow	United Kingdom		
15	1966	Utrecht	Netherlands		
16	1967	Madrid	Spain		
17	1968	Bern	Switzerland		
18	1969	Brussels	Belgium		
19	1970	Tokyo	Japan		
20	1971	Gijón	Spain		
21	1973	Munich	West Germany		
22	1975	Madrid	Spain		
23	1977	Utrecht	Netherlands		
24	1978	Busan	South Korea		
25	1979	Cork	Ireland		
26	1981	Atlanta	United States		17
27	1983	Linz	Austria		
28	1985	Osaka	Japan		
29	1988	Sydney	Australia		
30	1989	Birmingham	United Kingdom		
31	1991	Amsterdam	Netherlands		
32	1993	Taipei	Chinese Taipei		
33	1995	Lyon	France		
34	1997	St. Gallen	Switzerland		
As WorldSkills International
35	1999	Montreal	Canada		
36	2001	Seoul	South Korea		
37	2003	St. Gallen	Switzerland		
38	2005	Helsinki	Finland		
39	2007	Shizuoka	Japan		
40	2009	Calgary	Canada	45	51
41	2011	London	United Kingdom	46	52
42	2013	Leipzig	Germany		
43	2015	São Paulo	Brazil	45	55
44	2017	Abu Dhabi	United Arab Emirates	51	59
45	2019	Kazan	Russia	56	63
46	2022	Multiple locations			
47	2024	Lyon	France		69
48	2026	Shanghai	China		
49	2028	Aichi	Japan		

== Regional competitions ==
=== Africa ===
Sources:

1. 2026, Oran, ALG

=== Asia ===
Sources:

1. 2018, Abu Dhabi, UAE
2. 2023, Abu Dhabi, UAE
3. 2025, Taipei, TPE

=== Europe ===
EuroSkills with 34 nations:

1. 2008, Rotterdam, NED
2. 2010, Lisbon, POR
3. 2012, Spa Francorchamps, BEL
4. 2014, Lille, FRA
5. 2016, Gothenburg, SWE
6. 2018, Budapest, HUN
7. 2021, Graz, AUT
8. 2023, Gdańsk, POL
9. 2025, Herning, DEN
10. 2027, Düsseldorf, GER
11. 2029, Geneva, SUI

== Members ==
- Algeria
- Argentina
- Armenia
- Australia
- Austria
- Azerbaijan
- Bahrain
- Bangladesh
- Barbados
- Belarus
- Belgium
- Brazil
- Brunei
- Canada
- Chile
- China
- Colombia
- Costa Rica
- Croatia
- Denmark
- Dominican Republic
- Ecuador
- Egypt
- Estonia
- Finland
- France
- Georgia
- Germany
- Ghana
- Hong Kong
- Hungary
- Iceland
- India
- Indonesia
- Iran
- Ireland
- Israel
- Italy
- Jamaica
- Japan
- Kyrgyzstan
- Kazakhstan
- Kenya
- Kuwait
- Latvia
- Liechtenstein
- Luxembourg
- Macau
- Malaysia
- Mexico
- Mongolia
- Morocco
- Namibia
- Netherlands
- New Zealand
- Norway
- Oman
- Pakistan
- Palestine
- Paraguay
- Philippines
- Poland
- Portugal
- Romania
- Russia
- Saudi Arabia
- Singapore
- South Africa
- South Korea
- Spain
- Sri Lanka
- Sweden
- Switzerland
- Chinese Taipei
- Thailand
- Trinidad and Tobago
- Tunisia
- Turkey
- Uganda
- Ukraine
- United Arab Emirates
- United Kingdom
- United States
- Uzbekistan
- Venezuela
- Vietnam
- Zambia
