= Vocational education =

Studies that prepare a person for a specific occupation

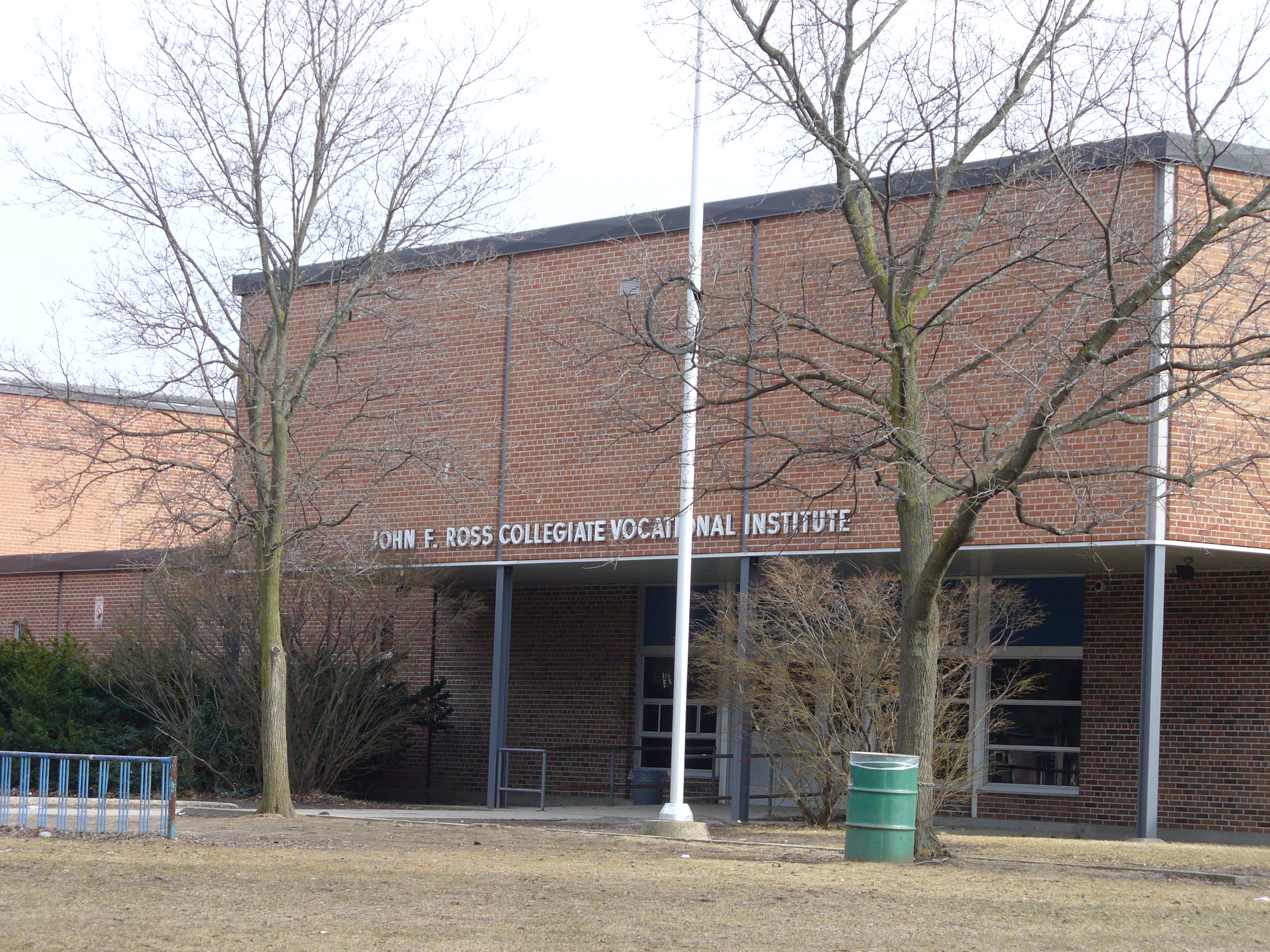
The John F. Ross Collegiate Vocational Institute is an institution of vocational learning in Guelph, Ontario, Canada, considered one of the first in the country.

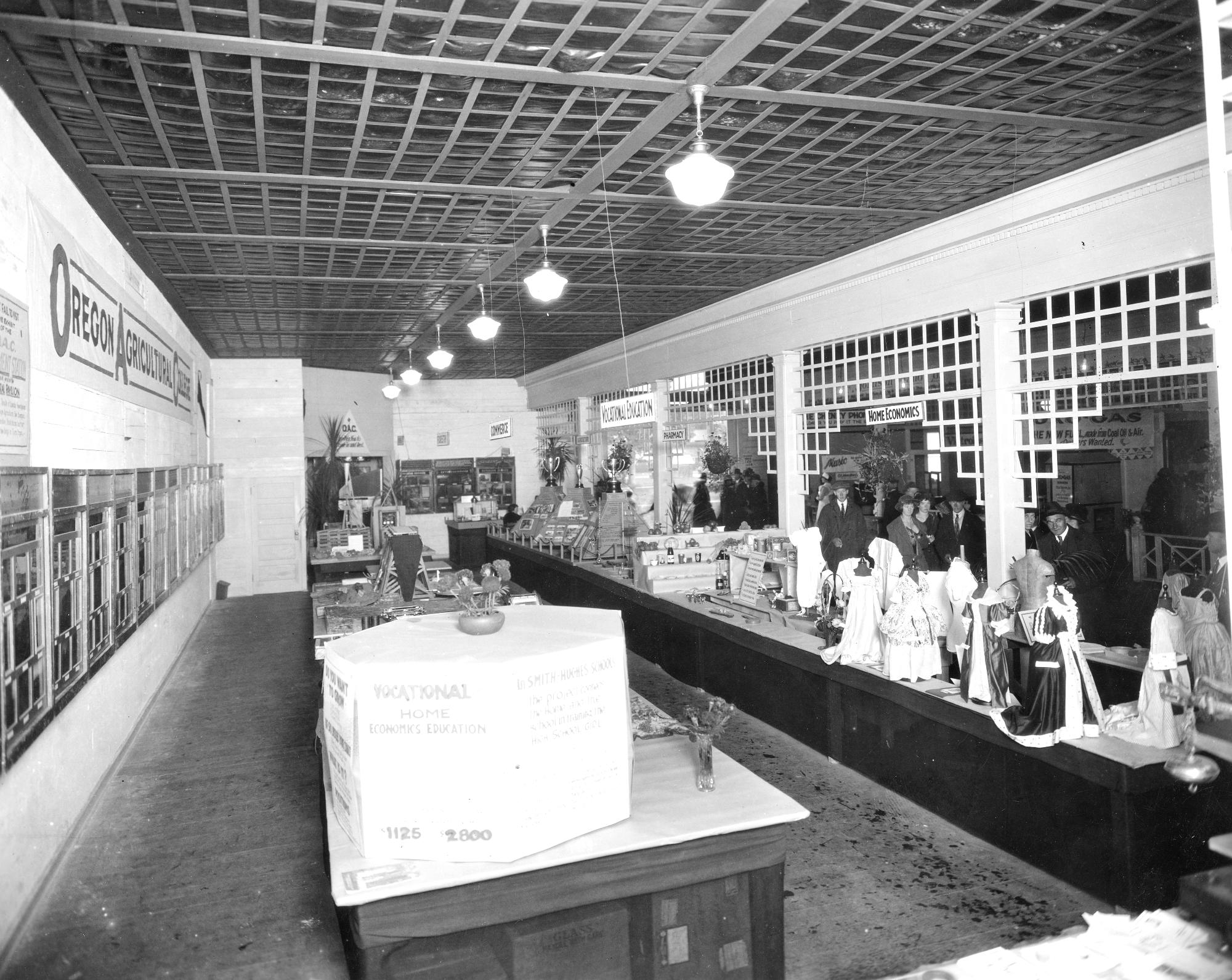
Oregon Agricultural College vocational education exhibit at the Oregon State Fair, 1922

Vocational education is education that prepares individuals for a skilled craft or occupation. Vocational education can also be defined as the type of education given to an individual. Vocational education is known by a variety of names, depending on the country concerned, including career and technical education, or acronyms such as TVET (technical and vocational education and training; used by UNESCO) and TAFE (technical and further education). TVE refers to all forms and levels of education which provide knowledge and skills related to occupations in various sectors of economic and social life through formal, non-formal and informal learning methods in both school-based and work-based learning contexts. To achieve its aims and purposes, TVE focuses on the learning and mastery of specialized techniques and the scientific principles underlying those techniques, as well as general knowledge, skills and values.

A vocational school is a type of educational institution specifically designed to provide vocational education, as is a technical college.

Vocational education can take place at the post-secondary, further education, and higher education levels. At the post-secondary level, vocational education is often provided by highly specialized trade schools, technical schools, community colleges, colleges of further education (UK), vocational universities, and institutes of technology (formerly called polytechnic institutes).

== Overview ==
Historically, most vocational education took place in classrooms or on job sites, with students learning trade skills and trade theory from accredited instructors or established professionals. However, in recent years, online vocational education has grown in popularity, making learning various trade skills and soft skills from established professionals easier than ever for students, even those who may live far away from a traditional vocational school.

Trends have emerged in the implementation of TVET and skills development worldwide. From the late 1980s onwards a number of governments began to emphasize on the role of education in preparing learners effectively for the world of work. This school of thought, termed "new vocationalism", placed the skills needs of industry at the centre of discussions on the purpose of public education. TVET and skills development were viewed as an important component in promoting economic growth in general and addressing youth unemployment in particular.

General education systems had not been effective in developing the skills that many adolescents and adults needed to secure employment in industry. The late 1980s and early 1990s saw the introduction and expansion of new vocational curricula and courses, often developed in collaboration with industry, and an increase in the variety of work-based learning routes on offer to young people.

== Purpose ==
TVET serves multiple purposes. One purpose is to prepare the youth for work. This is done through the learning and development of work related skills and the mastery of underlying knowledge and scientific principles. Work is broadly defined and therefore refers to both formal employment and self-employment. To support self-employment, TVET curricula often include entrepreneurship training. Related to this is the social reproduction and transformation of occupational and vocational practices.

A related role is continuing professional development. The rapid technological changes demand that workers continuously update their knowledge and skills. Unlike the past where a job could be held for life, it is common place to change vocations several times. TVET enables that flexibility in two ways. One is providing broad based technical knowledge and transversal skills on which different occupations can be based on. The second is providing continuing vocational training to workers. In contrast with the industrial paradigm of the old economy, today's global economy lays the onus on the worker to continually reinvent himself or herself. In the past, workers were assured of a job for life, with full-time employment, clear occupational roles and well established career paths. This is no longer the case. The knowledge dependent global economy is characterized by rapid changes in technology and related modes of work. Often, workers find themselves declared redundant and out of work. TVET today has the responsibility of re-skilling such workers to enable them find and get back to work Apart from providing work related education, TVET is also a site for personal development and emancipation. These concerns the development of those personal capacities that relate to realizing one's full potential with regard to paid or self employment, occupational interests, and life goals outside of work. At the same time TVET seeks to enable individual overcome disadvantages due to circumstances of birth or prior educational experiences.

From a development point of view, TVET facilitates provide economic growth by increasing the productivity of workers. The returns from increased output far exceed the costs of training, direct and indirect, leading to economic growth. TVET like any other form of education also facilitates socio-economic development by enhancing the capacity of individuals to adopt practices that are socially worthwhile. As a form of education similar to all others, TVET aims to developing the broad range of personal capabilities that characterize an educated person. Thus, the provision of broad based knowledge seeks to ensure critic-creative thinking. TVET also aims at developing capacities for effective communication and effective interpersonal relations.

== Opinions and models ==
Wilhelm von Humboldt's educational model goes beyond vocational training. In a letter to the Prussian king, he wrote: "There are undeniably certain kinds of knowledge that must be of a general nature and, more importantly, a certain cultivation of the mind and character that nobody can afford to be without. People obviously cannot be good craftworkers, merchants, soldiers or businessmen unless, regardless of their occupation, they are good, upstanding and – according to their condition – well-informed human beings and citizens. If this basis is laid through schooling, vocational skills are easily acquired later on, and a person is always free to move from one occupation to another, as so often happens in life." The philosopher Julian Nida-Rümelin criticized discrepancies between Humboldt's ideals and the contemporary European education policy, which narrowly understands education as a preparation for the labor market, and argued that we need to decide between "McKinsey", to describe vocational training, and Humboldt.

=== Hybridisation ===
Because of TVET's isolation with other education streams it was not widely adopted, in particularly in secondary education. Steps were taken to reduce segmentation of education and training and to address institutional barriers that restricted TVET learners′ options including choices to move vertically to higher levels of learning, or horizontally to other streams.

Policy-makers have introduced forms of hybridization with other education systems, additionally some of the distinctions between TVET and ′academic′ education streams have been blurred. This hybridisation has been termed the ′vocationalization of secondary education′, a similar process has happened to a lesser extent in tertiary education.

== Private sector ==
Private TVET providers include for-profit and non-profit institutions. Several factors triggered actions to support the expansion of private TVET including the limited capacities of public TVET providers and their low responsiveness to enterprises and trainees. Private TVET providers were expected to be more responsive because they were subject to fewer bureaucratic restrictions than public institutions (particularly in centralized systems). Their presence was expected to help raise quality system-wide, in many developing countries, government budgets constituted a vulnerable and unreliable source of financing for TVET, an important objective was to finance TVET systems by increasing the contribution of beneficiaries, including employers and trainees.

Private TVET provision over since 2005 has become a significant and growing part of TVET in sub-Saharan Africa, the Middle East and North Africa. In some countries, e.g. Lebanon, enrolments in private TVET institutions have exceeded enrolments in public institutions. In Jordan, private provision at the community college level has been promoted by the government. However, not all experiences has been positive with private proprietary institutions or NGOs, their courses have often been concentrated in professional areas that typically do not require large capital investment, permitting easy entry and exit by private providers from the sector. Quality issues have also emerged, where market information about quality has been unavailable.

== Technological advancement and its impact ==
TVET has an important role to play in technology diffusion through transfer of knowledge and skills. Rapid technological progress has had and continues to have significant implications for TVET. Understanding and anticipating changes has become crucial for designing responsive TVET systems and, more broadly, effective skills policies. The flexibility to adapt the supply of skills to the rapidly, and in some cases radically, changing needs in sectors such as information technology and the green economy has become a central feature of TVET systems. Globally, the skills requirements and qualifications demanded for job entry are rising. This reflects a need for not just a more knowledgeable and skilled workforce, but one that can adapt quickly to new emerging technologies in a cycle of continuous learning.

TVET courses have been created to respond to the diverse ICT needs of learners, whether these are related to work, education or citizenship. New courses have been introduced to address occupational changes in the ICT job market, while many TVET providers have shifted provision towards a blended approach, with significantly more self-directed and/or distance learning. In developed countries, new ICT approaches have been introduced to modernize TVET organizations and to manage administration and finance, including learner records. In developing areas, these processes often involve political conflicts over education policy priorities: a study on cases in the Global South finds that particularly in resource-scarce settings, formal political mechanisms, such as partisan preferences of stakeholders, become the primary currency for local governors to build industrial reform coalitions geared towards upgrading skills.

== Education for all ==
The Education for All (EFA) movement encourages free education.

== Continuing TVET ==
TVET as a proportion of all upper secondary programmes

Continuing TVE involves ongoing training to upgrade existing skills and to develop new ones and has a much higher profile in ageing societies and knowledge-based economies. Increased recognition of the importance of human capital for economic growth and social development made it necessary to increase learning opportunities for adults in workplaces within the wider context of policies and strategies for lifelong learning.

In many countries policy-makers have considered ways to expand workplace learning opportunities for workers and to assess and give credit for knowledge and skills acquired in workplaces. Efforts were geared towards training for workers in companies, encouraged by legislation, financial incentives and contractual agreements.

== Challenges ==
=== Labour market demands and trends ===
After the 2008 financial crisis, labour markets across the world experienced structural changes that influenced the demand for skills and TVET. Unemployment worsened and the quality of jobs decreased, especially for youth. Gender differentials in labour force participation placed men ahead of women, and skill mismatches deepened. The crisis impacted labour markets adversely and led to deepening uncertainty, vulnerability of employment, and inequality. Furthermore, measures to improve efficiency and profitability in the economic recovery have often led to jobless growth, as happened in Algeria, India and post-apartheid South Africa.

In seeking to address the level of vulnerable employment, TVET systems have focused on increasing the employability of graduates and enhancing their capacity to function effectively within existing vulnerable labour markets and to adjust to other labour market constraints. This has meant enhanced coordination among government departments responsible for TVET and employment policies. It has also created the need for TVET systems to develop mechanisms that identify skills needs early on and make better use of labour market information for matching skills demands and supply. TVET systems have focused more on developing immediate job skills and wider competencies. This has been accomplished by adopting competency-based approaches to instruction and workplace learning that enable learners to handle vulnerable employment, adjust to changing jobs and career contexts, and build their capacity to learn and agility to adapt.

=== Migration flows ===
Increasing migration are significant challenges to the national character of TVET systems and qualifications. TVET qualifications are progressively expected not only to serve as proxies for an individual's competencies but to also act as a form of a currency that signals national and international value. TVET systems have been developing mechanisms to enable credible and fair cross-border recognition of skills. In 2007, the ILO identified three types of recognition that TVET system may use: unilateral (independent assessment by the receiving country), mutual (agreements between sending and receiving countries), and multilateral (mostly between a regional grouping of countries). The most prevalent of these is unilateral recognition, which is mostly under the control of national credential evaluation agencies. Countries have been slow to move from input-based skill evaluations to outcome-based methodologies that focus on competencies attained.

TVET systems are responding to migration by providing qualifications that can stand the rigour of these recognition systems and by creating frameworks for mutual recognition of qualifications. Regional Qualifications Frameworks such as those in Southern Africa, Europe, Asia and the Caribbean aim to significantly support the recognition of qualifications across borders. These efforts are further supported through the introduction of outcome-based learning methodologies within the broader context of multilateral recognition agreements.

=== Providing broader competencies alongside specialist skills ===
Skills for economic development include a mix of technical and soft skills. Empirical evidence and TVET policy reviews conducted by UNESCO suggest that TVET systems may not as yet sufficiently support the development of the so-called soft competencies. Many countries have, however, adopted competency-based approaches as measures for reforming TVET curricula.

The HEART Trust National Training Agency of Jamaica adopted this approach, with a particular emphasis on competency standards and balanced job-specific and generic skills. Competency standards aimed to ensure that the training was linked to industry and was up to date, and that competences were integrated into training programmes, along with the needed knowledge, skills and attitudes. The balancing of skill types was to ensure adequate attention was given to job-specific skills as well as the conceptual and experiential knowledge necessary to enable individuals to grow and develop in the workplace, and more generally in society.

=== Promoting social equity and inclusive workplaces ===
Preparing marginalized groups of youths and adults in with the right skills and helping them make the transition from school to work is part of the problem faced by TVET in promoting social equity. Ensuring that the workplace is inclusive poses numerous policy challenges, depending on the contextual dynamics of inclusion and exclusion, and the capabilities of individuals. For example, the experiences of exclusion by people with disabilities and disadvantaged women may be similar in some ways and different in others. Many individuals experience multiple forms of disadvantage in the workplace, to different degrees of severity, depending on social attitudes and traditions in a specific context or organization. Approaches to inclusiveness in the workplace will therefore vary according to population needs, social diversity and context. To give one example, the Netherlands set about the task of making workplaces more inclusive for low-skilled adults by offering programmes that combine language instruction with work, and in certain cases on-the-job training.

A review of employer surveys in Australia, the Netherlands, the United Kingdom and the United States of America, reported that employers valued people with disabilities for their high levels of motivation and their diverse perspectives, and found their attendance records to be the same or better than those of other employees. Many employers mentioned that being seen as pro-inclusion was positive for the company or organization's image, an advantage that goes well beyond providing employment opportunities to disadvantaged groups. In many cases, however, social and cultural perceptions are an obstacle to making workplaces more inclusive, and this will require sensitive and concerted attention. Some low- and middle-income countries have sought to address this through legislation. In Tanzania the Disabled Persons (Employment) Act of 1982 established a quota system that stipulates that 2 per cent of the workforce in companies with over fifty employees must be persons with disabilities.

The 2012 Education for All Global Monitoring Report concluded that 'all countries, regardless of income level, need to pay greater attention to the needs of young people who face disadvantage in education and skills development by virtue of their poverty, gender or other characteristics'. The report found that several barriers and constraints reduced the success of TVET in meeting social equity demands. First, national TVET policies in most cases failed to address the skills needs of young people living in urban poverty and in deprived rural areas. Second, additional funds were needed to support TVET learning opportunities on a much larger scale. Third, the training needs of disadvantaged young women were particularly neglected. The 2012 EFA Global Monitoring Report also noted that skills training alone was not sufficient for the most disadvantaged of the rural and urban poor. Coherent policies that link social protection, micro-finance and TVET are considered critical for ensuring better outcomes for marginalized groups.

=== Gender disparities ===
Recent years have seen rising numbers of young women enrolling in TVET programmes, especially in service sector subjects. At times the challenge is to bring more males into female-dominated streams. However, beyond number games, the real gender parity test that TVET systems are yet to pass is balancing the gender participation in programmes that lead to employability, as well as to decent and high-paying jobs. Gender disparities in learning opportunities, and earnings, are a cause for concern. The persistent gender-typing of TVET requires concerted attention if TVET is to really serve a key facilitative role in shared growth, social equity and inclusive development.

The absence of work, poor quality of work, lack of voice at work, continued gender discrimination and unacceptably high youth unemployment are all major drivers of TVET system reforms from the perspective of social equity. This is an area where TVET systems continue to be challenged to contribute proactively to the shaping of more equitable societies.

Gender equality has received significant international attention in recent years, and this has been reflected in a reduction in gender participation gaps in both primary and secondary schooling. Efforts to analyse and address gender equality in TVET are relevant to other aspects of equity and dimensions of inclusion/exclusion. In almost all parts of the world, the proportion of girls to total enrolment in secondary education defined as TVET is less than for 'general' secondary education.

==== The Shanghai Consensus of the Third International Congress on TVET ====
The Shanghai Consensus of the Third International Congress on TVET made the following recommendations on expanding access and improving quality and equity, including to:

"Improve gender equality by promoting equal access of females and males to TVET programmes, particularly in fields where there is strong labour market demand, and by ensuring that TVET curricula and materials avoid stereotyping by gender."

== By country ==
=== Argentina ===
Argentina was one of the first countries in Latin America to run apprenticeship and vocational programs. From 1903 to 1909 basic programs were delivered at main cities. The entity charged with delivering these programs was the General Workers' Union (Spanish: Unión General de Trabajadores; abbreviated UGT), an Argentine national labor confederation.

The massive development of vocational education in Argentina took place during the period between World War I and World War II, with the large influx of immigrants from Europe. During the presidency of Juan Perón, the first formal apprenticeship and vocational training programs were offered free of charge across the country, eventually becoming the National Workers' University (Universidad Obrera Nacional) under the National Vocational Programs Law 13229, implemented on August 19, 1948. These programs were created and supported by the federal government and delivered by provincial governments at various technical colleges and regional universities as well as industrial centers; they were meant to deal with the lack of technical specialists in Argentina at a time of rapid industrialization expansion across the country. The degrees granted were that of technician and factory engineer in many specialties.

Currently, vocational education programs are delivered by public and private learning organizations, supported by the Argentine Ministry of Labour and Ministry of Education. The leading providers of technical and vocational education in the country are the National Technological University (UTN) (Universidad Tecnológica Nacional, UTN) and the National University of the Arts (UNA) (Universidad Nacional de las Artes, UNA).

=== Australia ===
In Australia vocational education and training is mostly post-secondary and provided through the vocational education and training (VET) system by registered training organisations. However some secondary schools do offer school-based apprenticeships and traineeships for students in years 10, 11 and 12. There were 24 Technical Colleges in Australia but now only 5 independent Trade Colleges remain with three in Queensland; one in Townsville (Tec-NQ), one in Brisbane (Australian Trade College) and one on the Gold Coast (Australian Industry Trade College) and one in Adelaide and Perth. This system encompasses both public, TAFE, and private providers in a national training framework consisting of the Australian Quality Training Framework, Australian Qualifications Framework and Industry Training Packages which define the competency standards for the different vocational qualifications.

Australia's apprenticeship system includes both apprenticeships in "traditional" trades and "traineeships" in other more service-oriented occupations. Both involve a legal contract between the employer and the apprentice or trainee and provide a combination of school-based and workplace training. Apprenticeships typically last three to four years, traineeships only one to two years. Apprentices and trainees receive a wage which increases as they progress through the training scheme.

The states and territories are responsible for providing funding for government subsidised delivery in their jurisdiction and the Commonwealth Government, through the Australian Skills Quality Authority, provides regulation of registered training organisations except in Victoria and Western Australia. A central concept of the VET system is "national recognition", whereby the assessments and awards of any one registered training organisation must be recognised by all others, and the decisions of any VET regulatory authority must be recognised by the all states and territories. This allows national portability of qualifications and units of competency.

A crucial feature of the training package (which accounts for about 60% of publicly funded training and almost all apprenticeship training) is that the content of the vocational qualifications is theoretically defined by industry and not by government or training providers. A Training Package is endorsed by the Australian Industry and Skills Committee before it can be used by RTOs to deliver Nationally Accredited Training.

The National Centre for Vocational Education Research or NCVER is a not-for-profit company owned by the federal, state and territory ministries responsible for training. It is responsible for collecting, managing, analysing, evaluating and communicating research and statistics about vocational education and training (VET).

The boundaries between vocational education and tertiary education are becoming more blurred. A number of vocational training providers such as Melbourne Polytechnic, BHI and WAI are now offering specialised bachelor's degrees in specific areas not being adequately provided by universities. Such applied courses include equine studies, winemaking and viticulture, aquaculture, information technology, music, illustration, culinary management and many more.

=== Bangladesh ===
Integrating women or men into areas of specialization in which they were previously under-represented is important to diversifying opportunities for TVET. The National Strategy for Promotion of Gender Equality in TVET in Bangladesh set clear priorities and targets for breaking gender stereotypes. The Strategy developed by a Gender Working Group comprising fifteen representatives from government ministries and departments, employers, workers and civil society organizations. It provided an overview of the current status and nature of gender inequalities in TVET, highlighted the priority areas for action, explored a number of steps to promote equal participation of women in TVET, and outlined the way forward.

=== Cambodia ===
In Cambodia, TVET programmes set out to empower young women in traditional trades by upgrading their skills and technology in silk weaving. This led to the revitalization and reappraisal of a traditional craft by learners and society.

=== Commonwealth of Independent States ===
The largest and the most unified system of vocational education was created in the Soviet Union with the professional`no-tehnicheskoye uchilische and Tehnikum. But it became less effective with the transition of the economies of post-Soviet countries to a market economy.

=== European Union ===
Education and training is the responsibility of member states, but the single European labour market makes some cooperation on education imperative, including on vocational education and training. The 'Copenhagen process', based on the open method of cooperation between Member States, was launched in 2002 in order to help make vocational education and training better and more attractive to learners throughout Europe. The process is based on mutually agreed priorities that are reviewed periodically. Much of the activity is monitored by Cedefop, the European Centre for the Development of Vocational Training.

There is strong support, particularly in northern Europe, for a shift of resources from university education to vocational training. This is due to the perception that an oversupply of university graduates in many fields of study has aggravated graduate unemployment and underemployment. At the same time, employers are experiencing a shortage of skilled tradespeople.

=== Finland ===
In Finland, vocational education belongs to secondary education. After the nine-year comprehensive school, almost all students choose to go to either a lukio (high school), which is an institution preparing students for tertiary education, or to a vocational school. Both forms of secondary education last three years, and give a formal qualification to enter university or ammattikorkeakoulu, i.e., Finnish polytechnics. In certain fields (e.g., the police school, air traffic control personnel training), the entrance requirements of vocational schools include completion of the lukio, thus causing the students to complete their secondary education twice.

The education in vocational school is free, and students from low-income families are eligible for a state student grant. The curriculum is primarily vocational, and the academic part of the curriculum is adapted to the needs of a given course. The vocational schools are mostly maintained by municipalities.

After completing secondary education, one can enter higher vocational schools (ammattikorkeakoulu, or AMK) or universities.

It is also possible for a student to choose both lukio and vocational schooling. The education in such cases lasts usually from three to four years.

=== France and the Netherlands ===
The baccalauréat professionnel in France, and the middelbaar beroepsonderwijs (MBO) count work experience in the area they are specializing in.

=== Germany ===
Vocational education in Germany is based on the German model. A law (the Berufsausbildungsgesetz) was passed in 1969 which regulated and unified the vocational training system and codified the shared responsibility of the state, the unions, associations and Industrie- und Handelskammer (chambers of trade and industry). The system is very popular in modern Germany: in 2001, two-thirds of young people aged under 22 began an apprenticeship, and 78% of them completed it, meaning that approximately 51% of all young people under 22 have completed an apprenticeship. One in three companies offered apprenticeships in 2003; in 2004 the government signed a pledge with industrial unions that all companies except very small ones must take on apprentices. From 2010 to 2023, the number of young people starting dual vocational training, has fallen. In recent years, Germany has invested a great deal of money to keep young people in the school system as long as possible. Apprenticeships enhanced content within occupational training courses and considerable emphasis has been placed on personal skills.

=== Greece ===
In Greece, vocational education and training (VET) is usually for lyceum (senior high school) graduates and is provided by public or private Schools of Higher Vocational Training [formerly known as Institute of Vocational Training (IEK) (IEK, the Greek abbreviation for the Ινστιτούτο Επαγγελματικής Κατάρτισης)]. The IEK course offerings are adult education only, except at times when it is rarely offered a course for non-adult students. The duration of study is two-and-a-half academic years full-time, 2 ½ years. 4 semesters in-school education and 1 semester being known as curricular practicum or on-the-job placement or internship, both involve a legal contract between the employer and the student-trainee on the job placement and provide a combination of school-based training and workplace practicum. Public IEKs are government-funded with free education, and it can be attended without tuition fee.

=== Hong Kong ===
In Hong Kong, vocational education is usually for post-secondary 6 students. The Hong Kong Institute of Vocational Education (IVE) provides training in nine different vocational fields, namely: applied science, business administration, child education and community services, construction, design, printing, textiles and clothing, hotel service and tourism studies, information technology, electrical and electronic engineering, and mechanical, manufacturing and industrial engineering.

=== Hungary ===
Normally at the end of elementary school (at age 14) students are directed to one of three types of upper secondary education: one academic track (gymnasium) and two vocational tracks. Vocational secondary schools (szakgimnázium) provide four years of general education and also prepare students for the maturata (school leaving certificate). These schools combine general education with some specific subjects, referred to as pre-vocational education and career orientation. At that point many students enrol in a post-secondary VET programme often at the same institution a vocational qualification, although they may also seek entry to tertiary education.

Vocational training schools (szakiskola) initially provide two years of general education, combined with some pre-vocational education and career orientation, they then choose an occupation, and then receive two or three years of vocational education and training focusing on that occupation—such as bricklayer. Students do not obtain the maturata but a vocational qualification at the end of a successfully completed programme. Demand for vocational training, both from the labour market and among students, has declined while it has increased for upper secondary schools delivering the maturata.

=== India ===
Vocational training in India historically has been a subject handled by the Ministry of Labour, other central ministries and various state-level organizations. To harmonize the variations and multiplicity in terms of standards and costs, the National Skills Qualification Framework was launched in December 2013.

Work education has been included in the primary standards (grades 1–8) to make the students aware of work. At the lower secondary level (grades 9–10) pre-vocational education has been included with the aim to increase students' familiarity with the world of work.

The National Skills Qualifications Framework (NSQF) is a competency-based framework that organizes all qualifications according to a series of levels of knowledge, skills and aptitude. These levels, graded from one to ten, are defined in terms of learning outcomes which the learner must possess regardless of whether they are obtained through formal, non-formal, and informal methods. NSQF in India was notified on 27 December 2013. All other frameworks, including the NVEQF (National Vocational Educational Qualification Framework) released by the Ministry of HRD, stand superseded by the NSQF.

In November 2014 the new Government in India formed the Ministry of Skill Development and Entrepreneurship. Articulating the need for such a Ministry, the Prime Minister said, "A separate Ministry, which will look after promoting entrepreneurship and skill development, would be created. Even developed countries have accorded priority to promoting skilled manpower".

As a continuation of its efforts to harmonize and consolidate skill development activities across the country, the Government launched the 1st Skill India Development Mission (NSDM) on 15 July 2015. Also launched on the day was the National Policy for Skill Development & Entrepreneurship.

Today all skill development efforts through the Government (Directorate General of Training) and through the Public Private Partnership arm (National Skill Development Corporation) are carried out under the Ministry, through the Skill India Mission.

The Ministry works with various central ministries and departments and the State government in implementing the NSQF across all Government funded projects, based on a five-year implementation schedule for complete convergence.

The involvement of the private sector in various aspects of skill development has enhanced access, quality, and innovative financing models leading to sustainable skill development organizations on the ground. The short-term skill development programs (largely offered by private organizations) combined with the long-term programs offered by the Indian technical institutes (ITIs) complement each other under the larger framework. Credit equivalency, transnational standards, quality assurance and standards are being managed by the Ministry through the National Skill Development Agency (an autonomous body under the Ministry) in close partnership with industry-led sector-specific bodies (Sector Skill Councils) and various line ministries.

India has bilateral collaboration with governments including those of the UK, Australia, Germany, Canada, and the UAE, with the intention of implementing globally acceptable standards and providing the Indian workforce with overseas job mobility.

=== Iran ===
The Iran Technical and Vocational Training Organization or in brief I.R.T.V.T.O is one of the organizations affiliated to the Ministry of Cooperatives, Labour, and Social Welfare, which was formed from the merger of three educational institutions in 1980 in order to provide technical and vocational education. In addition to the central headquarters, this organization has 31 general administrations in provinces of Iran, an instructor training center, 552 Learning Center and over 11700 free technical and vocational schools. In order to achieve the latest science and technology news and to comply with international standards, the organization always tried to expand international relations, including with the International Labour Organization (ILO) and the International Organization for Vocational Training in other countries. In this regard, the organization, regardless of the interpretation of the overall organizational structure, carries out its activities only in the field of education, with the support of the research field. TVET is mostly presented by TVTO which is the most pervasive skill training body in Iran, which attempts to meet the skill needs of the labor market and also updates the skills of employees with the latest technologies. It functions as the provider and executor of informal technical and vocational training in agriculture, industry, services, culture, and art. TVTO has headquarters in the capital city of Tehran, an instructor training center(ITC) in Karaj city, 31 provincial head offices, 641 public training centers, 4710 public workshops, and over 12000 private institutions across the country.

The Technical and Vocational University (TVU) (Persian: دانشگاه فنی و حرفه‌ای, Danushgah-e Feni-ye Herfehai) includes higher education that runs all technical/vocational colleges across the country. The main objective of this University, training technicians in the majors technical. 4/5 of majors are belongs to Associate degree and 1/5 belongs to Bachelor's degree. The university has more than 176 schools and colleges across the country, and with more than 180 thousand students, it is one of the largest universities in Iran. there are all of the technical and vocational Majors. To achieve the goals, TVTO holds 3-18-month training courses for job seekers and employees in different sectors. Along with training programs, there are activities of research, construction, equipment and development of human resources, most importantly including: codifying training standards based on international codes, research, updating training standards, research in training programs, training aids, audiovisuals, setting up and equipping workshops of training centers, setting up new workshops, guilds' skill testing, determining the technical competence of applicants of private institutions, holding specialized conferences, issuing skill certificates for construction workers.

=== Iraq ===
It is a new experiment in Iraq about TVET, there are three ministries related to TVET in Iraq, the Ministry of Higher Education and scientific research which is represented by the technical universities, the Ministry of Education which is represented by the vocational education foundation, and the Ministry of Labor and Social Guaranty which is represented by vocational training centers. These associations are trained by UNESCO for the last three years on the main topics and fields of TVET, so they are now waiting for the Iraqi Perelman to put a suitable law for the TVET Council in Iraq to start its system and control these associations with the required outputs of TVET.

=== Israel ===
Israel offers a post-high school college education system for technical occupations and engineering, aimed at high-school graduates of technological tracks. Students demonstrating technological potential in schools supervised by the Ministry of Labor, Social Affairs, and Services (MOLSA) may avail themselves of the MENTA Program, which provides scholastic, emotional, and social support throughout their high school and college studies. This support helps students meet the scholastic challenges and demands of the vocational track and, via the program, strives to expand both the number of youth continuing through college Grades 13-14 and the percentage eligible for a diploma at the end of their studies. The program was formulated by JDC-Ashalim in cooperation with the HEZNEK organization, the Ministry of Education, the Ministry of Economy (and subsequently, MOLSA), and by education networks operating schools. A 2016-17 formative evaluation of MENTA found that the program was successful in helping students complete their matriculation, strengthen their sense of self-efficacy, and create for themselves a picture of the future. At the same time, the findings suggested that program better clarify the target population, improve the supports for transition to college, and more clearly define the scope of the coordinators' role.

=== Japan ===
Japanese vocational schools are known as senmon gakkō. They are part of Japan's higher education system. They are two-year schools that many students study at after finishing high school (although it is not always required that students graduate from high school). Some have a wide range of majors, others only a few majors. Some examples are computer technology, fashion, and English.

=== Kazakhstan ===
Vocational education (TVET) in Kazakhstan is a recognized level of education aimed at equipping students with the knowledge, skills, and competencies for specific professions or trades. Institutions providing vocational education include specialized schools (мамандандырылған мектептер), colleges, and higher-education institutions. The overall structure, curricula, admission procedures, and governance of vocational institutions are determined by national legislation and model-rule regulations, with each institution implementing its own charter.

Education under TVET programs combines theoretical instruction with industrial or practical training, often including apprenticeships at enterprises or training workshops. Training may be delivered full-time, in the evening, via correspondence, or online, depending on the specialty and institution. TVET programs generally last 2–4 years, depending on whether students enter after grade 9 (secondary-vocational) or grade 11 (post-secondary), though exact durations vary by institution and specialty.

State regulation ensures citizens can receive free vocational education under a state-order system if it is their first time obtaining that level of education. Kazakhstan first announced plans to provide free technical and vocational education in 2014, aiming to give school leavers without a profession their first vocational qualification, and the policy was formally implemented in 2017 under the national program "Free Vocational and Technical Education for All", which expanded state-order funding and guaranteed tuition-free places for eligible first-time TVET students; by 2025, the initiative was further extended so that all vocational and technical colleges universally offered free training in priority, in-demand specialties.

As of 2023, 67,500 people completed short-term vocational courses, and the national online platform trained 57,700 adults, 14,600 of whom gained employment. Due to increase demands of blue-collar workers, vocational-education system in Kazakhstan is undergoing major reforms with President Kassym-Jomart Tokayev declaring 2025 as the "Year of Working Professions", which launched a modernization program to expand enrollment, upgrade infrastructure, and strengthen industry cooperation.

=== South Korea ===
Vocational high schools offer programmes in five fields: agriculture, technology/engineering, commerce/business, maritime/fishery, and home economics. In principle, all students in the first year of high school (10th grade) follow a common national curriculum, In the second and third years (11th and 12th grades) students are offered courses relevant to their specialisation. In some programmes, students may participate in workplace training through co-operation between schools and local employers. The government is now piloting Vocational Meister Schools in which workplace training is an important part of the programme. Around 40% of secondary students are currently enrolled in TVET education, in some schools, academic and vocational students share almost 75% of the curriculum. Around half of all vocational high schools are private. Private and public schools operate according to similar rules; for example, they charge the same fees for high school education, with an exemption for poorer families.

The number of students in vocational high schools has decreased, from about half of students in 1995 down to about one-quarter today. To make vocational high schools more attractive, in April 2007 the Korean government changed the name of vocational high schools into professional high schools. With the change of the name the government also facilitated the entry of vocational high school graduates to colleges and universities.

Most vocational high school students continue into tertiary education; in 2007 43% transferred to junior colleges and 25% to university. At tertiary level, vocational education and training is provided in junior colleges (two- and three-year programmes) and at polytechnic colleges. Education at junior colleges and in two-year programmes in polytechnic colleges leads to an Industrial associate degree. Polytechnics also provide one-year programmes for craftsmen and master craftsmen and short programmes for employed workers. The requirements for admission to these institutions are in principle the same as those in the rest of tertiary sector (on the basis of the College Scholastic Aptitude Test) but candidates with vocational qualifications are given priority in the admission process. Junior colleges have expanded rapidly in response to demand and in 2006 enrolled around 27% of all tertiary students.

95% of junior college students are in private institutions. Fees charged by private colleges are approximately twice those of public institutions. Polytechnic colleges are state-run institutions under the responsibility of the Ministry of Labour; government funding keeps student fees much lower than those charged by other tertiary institutions. Around 5% of students are enrolled in polytechnic colleges.

=== Malaysia ===
Skills training are no longer depicted as second-class education in Malaysia. There are numerous vocational education centres here including vocational schools (high schools to train skilled students), technic schools (high schools to train future engineers) and vocational colleges all of them under the Ministry of Education. Then there are 33 polytechnics and 86 community colleges under the Ministry of Higher Education; 10 MARA Advanced Skills Colleges, 13 MARA Skills Institutes, 286 GIATMARAs under Majlis Amanah Rakyat (MARA) and 15 National Youth Skills Institutes under Ministry of Youth and Sports. The first vocational institute in Malaysia is the Industrial Training Institute of Kuala Lumpur established in 1964 under the Manpower Department. Other institutes under the same department including 8 Advanced Technology Training Centres, one Centre for Instructor and Advanced Skill Training, one Japan-Malaysia Technical Institute and the other 21 ITIs.

=== Mexico ===
In Mexico, both federal and state governments are responsible for the administration of vocational education. Federal schools are funded by the federal budget, in addition to their own funding sources. The state governments are responsible for the management of decentralised institutions, such as the State Centres for Scientific and Technological Studies (CECyTE) and Institutes of Training for Work (ICAT). These institutions are funded 50% from the federal budget and 50% from the state budget. The state governments also manage and fund "decentralised institutions of the federation", such as CONALEP schools.

Compulsory education (including primary and lower secondary education) finishes at the age of 15 and about half of those aged 15-to-19 are enrolled full-time or part-time in education. All programmes at upper secondary level require the payment of a tuition fee.

The upper secondary vocational education system in Mexico includes over a dozen subsystems (administrative units within the Upper Secondary Education Undersecretariat of the Ministry of Public Education, responsible for vocational programmes) which differ from each other to varying degrees in content, administration, and target group. The large number of school types and corresponding administrative units within the Ministry of Public Education makes the institutional landscape of vocational education and training complex by international standards.

Vocational education and training provided under the Upper Secondary Education Undersecretariat includes three main types of programme:

- "Training for work" (formación para el trabajo) courses at ISCED 2 level are short training programmes, taking typically three to six months to complete. The curriculum includes 50% theory and 50% practice. After completing the programme, students may enter the labour market. This programme does not provide direct access to tertiary education. Those who complete lower secondary education may choose between two broad options of vocational upper secondary education at ISCED 3 level. Both programmes normally take three years to complete and offer a vocational degree as well as the baccalaureate, which is required for entry into tertiary education.
- The title "technical professional – baccalaureate" (profesional técnico — bachiller) is offered by various subsystems though one subsystem (CONALEP) includes two thirds of the students. The programme involves 35% general subjects and 65% vocational subjects. Students are required to complete 360 hours of practical training.
- The programme awarding the "technological baccalaureate" (bachillerato tecnológico) and the title "professional technician" (técnico professional) is offered by various subsystems. It includes more general and less vocational education: 60% general subjects and 40% vocational subjects.

=== Netherlands ===
Nearly all of those leaving lower secondary school enter upper secondary (vocational) education (Middelbaar BeroepsOnderwijs, MBO), and around 50% of them follow one of four vocational programmes; technology, economics, agricultural, personal/social services & health care. These programmes vary from 1 to 4 years (by level; only level 2, 3 and 4 diplomas are considered formal "start qualifications" for successfully entering the labour market). The programmes can be attended in either of two pathways. One either involving a minimum of 20% of school time (apprenticeship pathway; BBL-BeroepsBegeleidende Leerweg) or the other, involving a maximum of 80% schooltime (BOL -BeroepsOpleidende Leerweg). The remaining time in both cases is apprenticeship/work in a company. So in effect, students have a choice out of 32 trajectories, leading to over 600 professional qualifications. BBL-Apprentices usually receive a wage negotiated in collective agreements. Employers taking on these apprentices receive a subsidy in the form of a tax reduction on the wages of the apprentice. (WVA-Wet vermindering afdracht). Level 4 graduates of senior secondary VET may go directly to institutes for Higher Profession Education and Training (HBO-Hoger beroepsonderwijs), after which entering university is a possibility. This co-existence of upper secondary (MBO) and higher professional (HBO) education creates opportunities for further education and development, as well as a tension in the labour market because many vocations can be studied at various levels, and employers may prefer higher educated employees. The social partners participate actively in the development of policy. As of January 1, 2012 they formed a foundation for Co operation Vocational Education and Entrepreneurship (St. SBB – stichting Samenwerking Beroepsonderwijs Bedrijfsleven; www.s-bb.nl). Its responsibility is to advise the Minister on the development of the national vocational education and training system, based on the full consensus of the constituent members (the representative organisations of schools and of entrepreneurship and their centres of expertise). Special topics are Qualification & Examination, Apprenticeships (BPV-Beroepspraktijkvorming) and (labourmarket) Efficiency of VET. The Centres of Expertices are linked to the four vocational education programmes provided in senior secondary VET on the content of VET programmes and on trends and future skill needs. The Local County Vocational Training (MBO Raad www.mboraad.nl) represents the VET schools in this foundation and advise on the quality, operations and provision of VET.

=== New Zealand ===
New Zealand is served by 11 Industry Training Organisations (ITO). The unique element is that ITOs purchase training as well as set standards and aggregate industry opinion about skills in the labour market. Industry Training, as organised by ITOs, has expanded from apprenticeships to a more true lifelong learning situation with, for example, over 10% of trainees aged 50 or over. Moreover, much of the training is generic. This challenges the prevailing idea of vocational education and the standard layperson view that it focuses on apprenticeships.

One source for information in New Zealand is the Industry Training Federation. Another is the Ministry of Education.

Polytechnics, Private Training Establishments, Wananga and others also deliver vocational training, amongst other areas.

=== Nigeria ===
The educational system or structure of Nigeria has been changing over time. In the 1970's, the Nigerian educational system was 6-5-4. This changed as time passed, between 1980 and 2005, it was changed to 6-3-3-4. 2008 saw another educational system review to 9-3-4 system of education. All these reviews are shown in the National Policy on Education. Due to the type of education Nigeria inherited from her colonial masters, education in the 1960's were more book oriented. On 31 May 2025, the Nigeria's government through its minister of education launched TVET, aimed at tackling at rising unemployment in the country.

=== Norway ===
Nearly all those leaving lower secondary school enter upper secondary education, and around half follow one of nine vocational programmes. These programmes typically involve two years in school followed by two years of apprenticeship in a company. The first year provides general education alongside introductory knowledge of the vocational area. During the second year, courses become more trade-specific.

Apprentices receive a wage negotiated in collective agreements ranging between 30% and 80% of the wage of a qualified worker; the percentage increase over the apprenticeship period. Employers taking on apprentices receive a subsidy, equivalent to the cost of one year in school. After the two years vocational school programme some students opt for a third year in the "general" programme as an alternative to an apprenticeship. Both apprenticeship and a third year of practical training in school lead to the same vocational qualifications. Upper secondary VET graduates may go directly to Vocational Technical Colleges, while those who wish to enter university need to take a supplementary year of education.

The social partners participate actively in the development of policy. The National Council for Vocational Education and Training advises the Minister on the development of the national vocational education and training system. The Advisory Councils for Vocational Education and Training are linked to the nine vocational education programmes provided in upper secondary education and advise on the content of VET programmes and on trends and future skill needs. The National Curriculum groups assist in deciding the contents of the vocational training within the specific occupations. The Local County Vocational Training Committees advise on the quality, provision of VET and career guidance.

=== Paraguay ===
In Paraguay, vocational education is known as Bachillerato Técnico and is part of the secondary education system. These schools combine general education with some specific subjects, referred to as pre-vocational education and career orientation. After nine years of Educación Escolar Básica (Primary School), the student can choose to go to either a Bachillerato Técnico (Vocational School) or a Bachillerato Científico (High School). Both forms of secondary education last three years, and are usually located in the same campus called Colegio.

After completing secondary education, one can enter to the universities. It is also possible for a student to choose both Técnico and Científico schooling.

=== Philippines ===
In the Philippines, vocational education, also referred to as technical-vocational education and training (TVET), is the development of technical and practical skills for employment.

=== Poland ===
In Poland vocational programmes for the technical occupations are the part of the public system of post-secondary academic education. Post-secondary vocational school (post-secondary technical school) in Poland is known as Szkoła Policealna. It is an equivalent to a technical college in English-speaking countries. Admission to Post-secondary School in Poland is contingent upon the completion of secondary education. Post-secondary vocational schools offer professional training programs lasting to 2.5 years, including mandatory completion of internships at enterprises. The completion of Post-secondary vocational school in Poland results in the awarding of a technical diploma.

Post-secondary educational programs focus on practical and technical skills required for the work in specific industries, such as information technology, electronics, mechatronics, construction. In the field of information technology, such education includes training for programmers, database administrators and analysts, computer network specialists, and hardware specialists. In the field of electronics, it includes training for electronic circuit designers and microelectronics specialists.

According to the International Standard Classification of Education, the academic program of a post-secondary school in Poland is classified as ISCED 4.

=== Russia ===
A new approach to vocationalization of secondary schooling has been introduced within the framework of general educational reform. This has been guided by the Ministry of Education's strategy of modernization. Vocationalization in the Russian Federation refers to the introduction of profile education at the upper-secondary level (the last two years of schooling, grades 10 and 11) and the process of preparation for profile selection. Profile education provided students with the opportunity to study a chosen area in depth, usually one that would be related to their further study (TVET or academic). Schools could design their own profiles, e.g. science, socio-economics, humanities, and technology, or keep a general orientation curriculum. In preparation for the upper-secondary specialization, a ′pre-profiling′ programme in grade 9 has been introduced to help students make their choices in grade 10.

=== Spain ===
In Spain, vocational education is divided into 3 stages as of 2014. They're known as Formación profesional Básica, which can be started in 3º ESO; Formación profesional de Grado Medio, which can be started after 4º ESO or after graduating from Formación profesional Básica; and Formación profesional de Grado Superior, which can be started after 2º Bachillerato, or after graduating from Formación profesional de Grado Medio. University can then be accessed after graduating from Formación profesional de Grado Superior, without the need to pass through Bachillerato.

There are typically two courses imparted until graduation. Each titulation is called a Ciclo, heavily specialized depending on its related professional discipline.

Spanish vocational education also features a Dual education system named Formación Profesional Dual, although not all Vocational Schools may feature it.

=== Sri Lanka ===
Vocational training from Agricultural subjects to ICT related subjects are available in Sri Lanka. In 2005 the Ministry of Vocational and Technical Training (MVTT) introduced the National Vocational Qualifications (NVQ) framework which was an important milestone for the education, economic and social development of Sri Lanka. The NVQ framework consists of seven levels of instruction. NVQ levels 1 to 4 are for craftsmen designation and successful candidates are issued with National certificates. NVQ levels 5 and 6 are Diploma level, whereas Level 7 is for degree equivalent qualification.

Training courses are provided by many institutions island wide. All training providers (public and private) must obtain institutional registration and course accreditation from the Tertiary and Vocational Education Commission (TVEC).In order to obtain registration institutions must satisfy specific criteria: infrastructure, basic services, tools and equipment, quality of instruction and staff, based on curriculum and syllabus, and quality of management and monitoring systems.

Government Ministries and Agencies involved in Vocational Training are The Ministry of Vocational and Technical Training (MVTT), The Tertiary and Vocational Education Commission (TVEC), The National Apprentice and Industrial Training Authority (NAITA), The Department of Technical Education and Training (DTET), University of Vocational Technology(UoVT), The Vocational Training Authority (VTA) and the National Youth Services Council (NYSC).

=== Sweden ===
Nearly all of those leaving compulsory schooling immediately enter upper secondary schools, and most complete their upper secondary education in three years. Upper secondary education is divided into 13 vocationally oriented and 4 academic national programmes. Slightly more than half of all students follow vocational programmes. All programmes offer broad general education and basic eligibility to continue studies at the post-secondary level. In addition, there are local programmes specially designed to meet local needs and "individual" programmes.

A 1992 school reform extended vocational upper secondary programmes by one year, aligning them with three years of general upper secondary education, increasing their general education content, and making core subjects compulsory in all programmes. The core subjects (which occupy around one-third of total teaching time in both vocational and academic programmes) include English, artistic activities, physical education and health, mathematics, natural science, social studies, Swedish or Swedish as a second language, and religious studies. In addition to the core subjects, students pursue optional courses, subjects which are specific to each programme and a special project.

Vocational programmes include 15 weeks of workplace training (Arbetsplatsförlagt lärande – APL) over the three-year period. Schools are responsible for arranging workplace training and verifying its quality. Most municipalities have advisory bodies: programme councils (programmråd) and vocational councils (yrkesråd) composed of employers' and employees' representatives from the locality. The councils advise schools on matters such as provision of workplace training courses, equipment purchase and training of supervisors in APL.

=== Switzerland ===
The Swiss vocational education and training system (VET) is regarded by many international experts as the strongest in Europe. It is the mainstream upper secondary program serving 65-70% of Swiss young people. It results in one of the lowest youth unemployment rates in Europe. Managers and the staff take pride in their young apprentices. Several Swiss CEOs of big multinational companies and government members have started their own careers as VET-apprentices, for example Sergio Ermotti, CEO of UBS. At this level, vocational education and training is mainly provided through the "dual system". Apprentices rotate between workplace, vocational school and industry training centers where they develop complementary practical skills relating to the occupation. They spend the biggest amount of time at the workplace emphasizing the importance of on-the-job training. Rotation can be organised in different ways – either by switching places during the week or by allocating entire weeks to one place and form of learning. The program can also start with most of the time devoted to in-school education and then gradually increase the share of in-company training.

Besides the three- or four-year VET programme with Federal VET Diploma, there is also the option of two-year vocational education and training VET programme with Federal VET Certificate for adolescents with lower learning performance. Switzerland draws a distinction between vocational education and training programmes at upper-secondary level, and professional education and training (PET) programmes, which take place at tertiary B level. In 2007, more than half of the population aged 25–64 had a VET or PET qualification as their highest level of education. In addition, universities of applied sciences (Fachhochschulen) offer vocational education at tertiary A level. Pathways enable people to shift from one part of the education system to another.

=== Turkey ===
Students in Turkey may choose vocational high schools after completing the 8-year-long compulsory primary and secondary education. Vocational high school graduates may pursue two year-long polytechnics or may continue with a related tertiary degree.

According to a survey by OECD, 38% of 15-year-old students attend vocational study programmes that are offered by Anatolian vocational, Anatolian technical, and technical high schools.

Municipalities in Turkey also offer vocational training. The metropolitan municipality of Istanbul, the most populous city in Turkey, offers year long free vocational programs in a wide range of topics through ISMEK, an umbrella organization formed under the municipality.

=== United Kingdom ===
The first "Trades School" in the UK was Stanley Technical Trades School (now Harris Academy South Norwood) which was designed, built and set up by William Stanley. The initial idea was thought of in 1901, and the school opened in 1907.

The system of vocational education in the UK initially developed independently of the state, with bodies such as the RSA and City & Guilds setting examinations for technical subjects. The Education Act 1944 made provision for a Tripartite System of grammar schools, secondary technical schools and secondary modern schools, but by 1975 only 0.5% of British senior pupils were in technical schools, compared to two-thirds of the equivalent German age group.

Successive recent British Governments have made attempts to promote and expand vocational education. In the 1970s, the Business And Technology Education Council was founded to confer further and higher education awards, particularly to further education colleges in the United Kingdom. In the 1980s and 1990s, the Conservative Government promoted the Youth Training Scheme, National Vocational Qualifications and General National Vocational Qualifications. However, youth training was marginalised as the proportion of young people staying on in full-time education increased. Vocational technical qualifications (VTQs) are now (as of 2024) offered to learners alongside GCSE courses.

In 1994, publicly funded Modern Apprenticeships were introduced to provide "quality training on a work-based (educational) route". Numbers of apprentices have grown in recent years and the Department for Children, Schools and Families has stated its intention to make apprenticeships a "mainstream" part of England's education system.

In the UK some higher engineering-technician positions that require 4–5 years' apprenticeship require academic study to HNC / HND or higher City & Guilds level. Apprenticeships are increasingly recognised as the gold standard for work-based training. There are four levels of apprenticeship available for those aged 16 and over:

1. Intermediate-level apprenticeships
  Apprentices work towards work-based learning qualifications such as a Level 2 Competence Qualification, Functional Skills and, in most cases, a relevant knowledge-based qualification.
2. Advanced-level apprenticeships
  Apprentices work towards work-based learning such as a Level 3 Competence Qualification, Functional Skills and, in most cases, a relevant knowledge-based qualification. They can take four years to complete.
3. Higher apprenticeships
  Apprentices work towards work-based learning qualifications such as a Level 4 and 5 Competence Qualification, Functional Skills and, in some cases, a knowledge-based qualification such as a Foundation Degree. They can take between four and five years to complete, depending on the level at which an apprentice enrolls.
4. Degree and professional apprenticeships
  They are similar to higher apprenticeships, but differ in that they provide an opportunity to gain a full bachelor's (Level 6) or master's degree (Level 7). The courses are designed in partnership with employers, with part-time study taking place at a university. They can take between four and six years to complete, depending on the level of the course, and the level of entry.

"There is also a perception, deriving from centuries of social stratification and selectivity in the status and provision of different kinds of education in England, that vocational education is inevitably more narrowly utilitarian, less influential and less important than its more academic cousin: advanced ('A') levels. This divide between the sectors of 'vocational' and 'higher' education, in many ways peculiarly English, is also reflected in higher education institutions and occupations (regarding academic credentials and some related provisions). These academic-vocational divisions in the 'English model', together with negative social and political perceptions, have to some extent stymied the debate regarding the significance and relevance of vocational education provision to learning, work and the economy" (Loo and Jameson, 2017, p. 1). The authors suggest that the divisions between further and higher education sectors in England be reconsidered. They (Loo and Jameson, 2017) call for an opening up of new pathways of "occupation-related" provisions that offer greater parity, progression and enhanced social mobility in vocational education across the academic levels of England's educational provision.

Loo (2018) uses the term, technical and vocational education and training (TVET) by UNESCO (2012) as in the section below, to offer a more rational term than "vocational" in England, and to reach out to like-minded users in the global educational community. He offers insights into the study of the pedagogy of teachers of work-related programmes. Especially, he investigates the complex issue of how teachers use their know-how in their delivery of work-related programmes. This complexity surrounds the need for these deliverers to have the disciplinary and wider elements relating to knowledge of the relevant work practices, which involves the learning of the type of know-how and its application in their work practices. The combination of these work know-how (e.g. knowledge, experiences, dispositions and values) are then used to enable them to deliver to the learners. These pedagogic activities rely on different types of knowledge and experiences – pedagogic and work-related.

The theoretical framework uses, initially, a dual professionalism concept to review the literature sources of knowledge concerning the occupational pedagogy of teachers. From a pedagogic delineation of knowledge, teaching knowledge may include knowledge of the relevant disciplines (Becher 1994; Bernstein 1996; Smeby 1996) such as psychology and sociology (e.g. learning theories) for the education field. Teaching knowledge may be explicit or tacit (Shulman 1987; Polanyi 1966; Nonaka and Takeuchi 1995; Verloop et al. 2001; Loughran et al. 2003; Collins 2010), and may include a teacher's wider life experiences (Clandinin 1985) and occupational or work-related practices (Loo 2012).

Knowledge concerning occupational practices (i.e. non-teaching) also requires a base of disciplinary or theoretical know-how that may be explicit and a process of application to specific work contexts and the environment it operates in (Bernstein 1996; Loo 2012). This occupational knowledge base also includes knowledge of procedures, skills (e.g. interpersonal and intrapersonal ones which are usually tacit), techniques, transversal abilities, project management abilities, personal capabilities and occupational capacity/awareness (Eraut 2004; Winch 2014). This knowledge base is a wider spectrum than a pedagogic one.

These two forms of knowledge – pedagogic and occupational – may be applied through the processes of recontextualization (Bernstein 1996; van Oers 1998; Barnett 2006, Evans et al. 2010, Loo 2012, 2014). The knowledge forms can be changed through selecting, relocating and refocusing aspects when used in another setting. In particular, the recontextualization processes regarding content (relating to specifications of a programme), pedagogic (relating to teaching activities), occupational (relating to working activities), and work (relating to the systems and processes that are specific to a workplace or organisation). From the initial teaching and occupational dimensions, the final modified know-how of Occupational Pedagogic Knowledge or Occupational Teachers' Capacities is formed via content recontextualization, pedagogic recontextualization, occupational recontextualization, and integrated applied recontextualization (IAR). There are also relevant concepts that offer insights to the application of teaching and occupational know-how. These include knowledgeable practice (Evans 2016), practice architecture (Kemmis and Green 2013), and Systems 1 and 2 (Kahneman 2012). For a detailed description of the theoretical framework, please refer to Chapter 4 in Teachers and Teaching in Vocational and Professional Education (Loo, 2018). The conceptual framework of the occupational pedagogy of teachers is illustrated on page 50 (Loo 2018).

The analysed empirical data is discussed in the separate sections of TVET, higher and professional education courses, five case studies of fashion and textiles, airline industry, dental hygiene, clinical training in emergency medicine and doctors, and a comparison chapter. These chapters offer critical understandings of how pedagogic and occupational know-how are acquired and applied in highly contextualized pedagogic and occupational contexts culminating in the use of teaching strategies/approaches in teaching sessions.

The observations from this investigation include (Loo 2018): 1. there are programme pathways to occupational work 2. occupational pathways are more direct for work-related provisions at higher academic levels than those at the TVET level 3. two strands of practices exist at the outset: teaching and occupational where "basic" disciplinary or theoretical knowledge is used to provide occupational relevance to pedagogic and work-related areas 4. IAR process provides a critical understanding of how the modified teaching, occupational and work capacities are combined to inform the application of appropriate teaching strategies to specific pedagogic settings 5. users acquire the occupational capacities over the course duration, and they include abilities, capabilities, dispositions, experiences, judgement, knowledge, protocols, skill sets and techniques 6. deliverers require the relevant occupational experiences to teach on work-related programmes, and continuous professional development is needed for deliverers to maintain their ongoing professionalism in the two practice strands of teaching and work

Finally, this investigation has implications for teachers, managers and policymakers of occupational courses. For teachers, these include insights of the sources and types of knowledge that are acquired, recontextualized and applied for teaching and working in the related occupational areas. Managers need to empathise with the deliverers and support their professional needs, and policymakers need to acknowledge the complexities of teaching in occupational programmes and that the curriculum, professional staff and institution are adequately supported (Loo 2018).

=== United States ===
Tech-prep programmes in the United States of America are examples of how the ′blending′ approach was used to help students make the connections between school and work. In year nine, programmes in broad occupational fields such as the health professions, automotive technology, computer systems networking are offered within general technology studies. The programmes continue for at least two years after the end of secondary school, through a tertiary education or an apprenticeship programme, with students achieving an associate degree or certificate by the end of the programme.

== See also ==
- Agricultural education – Training in farming, natural resources, and land management
- Capacity building – Process within NGOs and non-profits
- Constructivism (learning theory) – Theory of knowledge
- Employability – Traits enabling a person to be employed
- Family and consumer science – Study of household management
- Finishing school – School for young women
- Institute of technology – Type of institution offering tertiary education
- Life skills – Abilities for adaptive and positive behavior
- Medical education – Education related to the practice of being a medical practitioner
- Policy development for skills and TVET
- Retraining – Process of learning a new or upgrading an old skill set or trade
- School-to-work transition
- Technical and Further Education – Vocational education system in Australia (Australia)
- Technology education or tech ed.
- Vocational university – Degree-granting applied professional education institution
- Washington County Closed-Circuit Educational Television Project – Closed-circuit television network in aiding elementary school teaching
- Widening participation – Policy to improve access and success in higher education (UK)
- Commonwealth Register of Institutions and Courses for Overseas Students (Australia)

== Sources ==
- This article incorporates text from a free content work. Licensed under CC BY-SA 3.0 IGO. Text taken from Taking a whole of government approach to skills development, UNESCO, UNESCO. UNESCO.
