= Hundred of Barossa =

Barossa
- Cadastral division
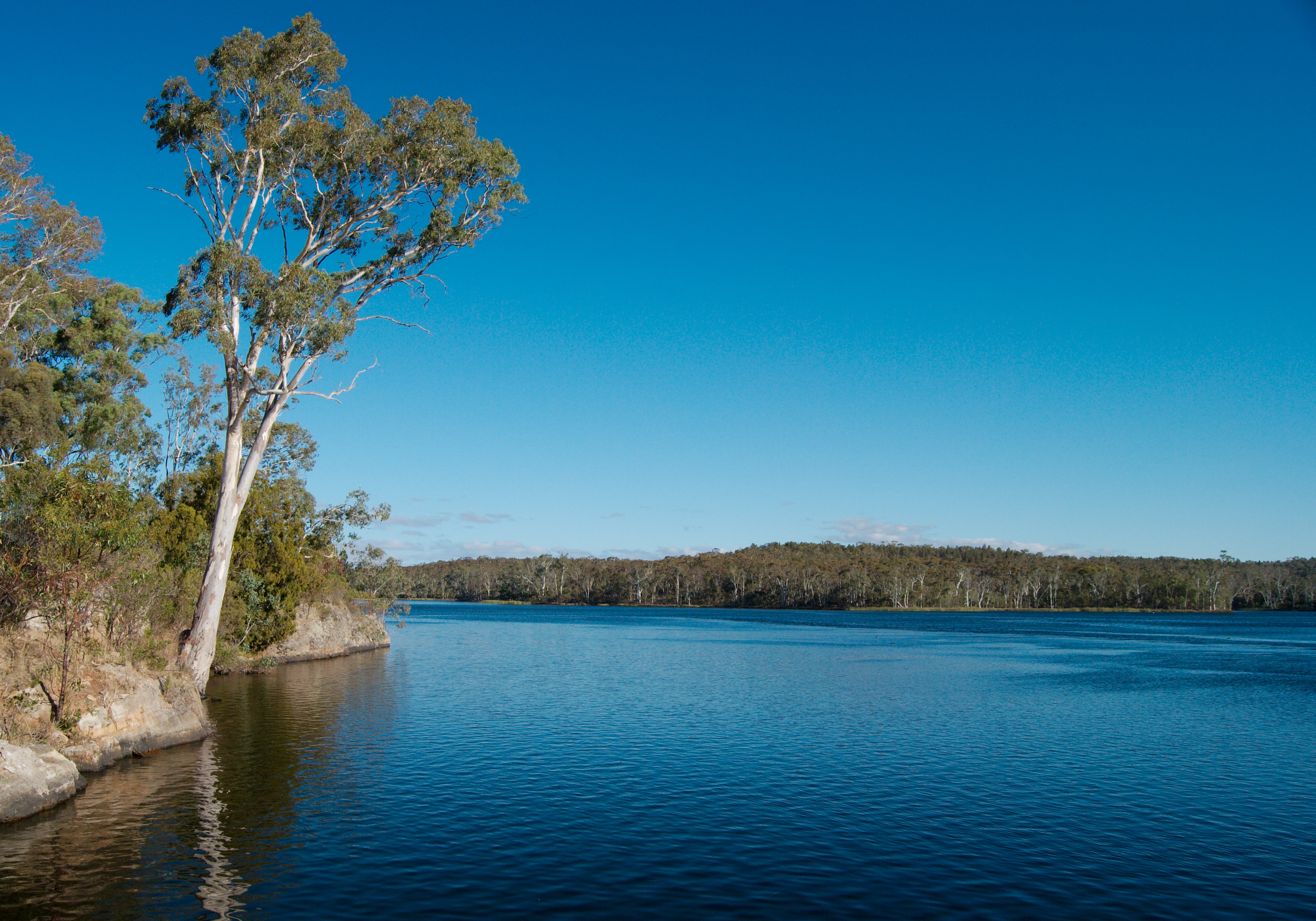
- Barossa Reservoir, Williamstown, at the hundred's centre

- Coordinates: 34°37′43″S 138°52′46″E
- Country: Australia
- State: South Australia
- Region: Barossa Light and Lower North
- LGA(s): Barossa Council
- Established: 29 October 1846

Area
  - Total: 255 km^{2} (98.5 sq mi)
- County: Adelaide
Lands administrative divisions around Barossa
Mudla Wirra	Nuriootpa	Moorooroo
Munno Para	Barossa	Jutland
Para Wirra	Para Wirra	Para Wirra

The Hundred of Barossa is a cadastral unit of hundred in South Australia in the northern Adelaide Hills. It lies west of the Barossa Range at the south end of the Barossa Valley and is bounded on the north and south by the North Para and South Para rivers, respectively. It is the most northern of the eleven hundreds of the County of Adelaide and was named in 1846 by Governor Frederick Robe after the Barossa Range.

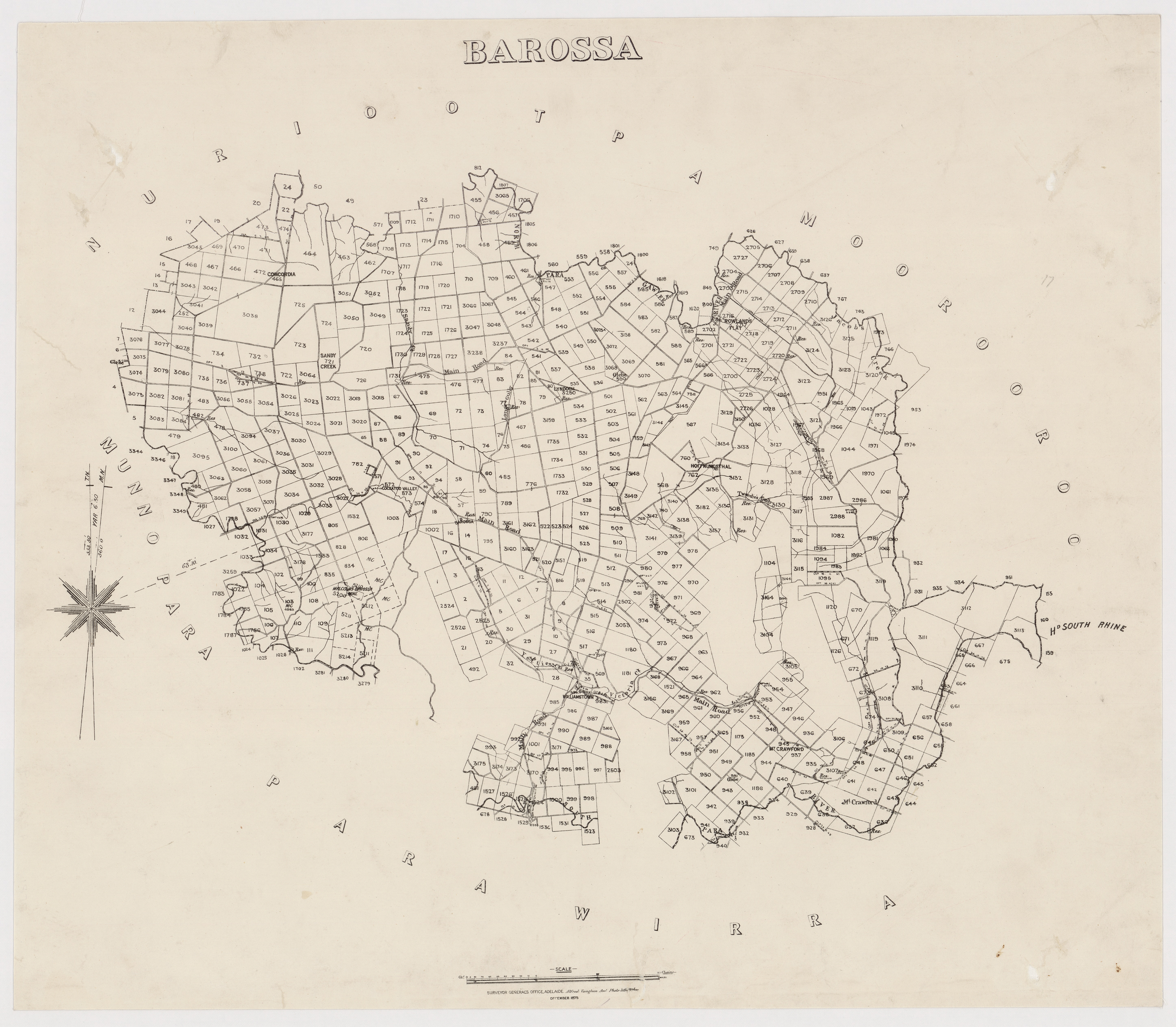
Plan of the Hundred of Barossa in 1875

The principal towns within the hundred are Williamstown, Lyndoch, and Gawler East at the western edge. Other localities include Kalbeeba, Concordia, Rosedale, Sandy Creek, Cockatoo Valley, Barossa Goldfields, Pewsey Vale, Altona and Rowland Flat.

== Local government ==
Dual local government was established for the hundred in January 1854 with the formation of the District Council of Barossa West. A few months later in June of that year the district councils of Barossa East and Mount Crawford were established to administer the north east and south east of the hundred, respectively. After lobbying by dissatisfied residents of Gawler at the confluence of the North Para and South Para rivers, the Town of Gawler was established in 1857 to govern the township of Gawler, annexing a small portion of Barossa West. In 1888, Barossa West and Barossa East councils were amalgamated as the District Council of Barossa bringing the whole hundred except for Gawler under the governance a single local council. The council remained in place for more than a hundred years before it was amalgamated with the District Council of Angaston and District Council of Tanunda to the north to form the much larger modern Barossa Council.

== See also ==
- Lands administrative divisions of South Australia
