= Barossa Trail =

Trail in the Barossa Valley, South Australia

- Length: 40 kilometres (25 mi)
- Location: Barossa Valley, Australia
- Established: 22 May 2014
- Trailheads: Kalbeeba 34.60322°S 138.79526°E; Tanunda 34.52853°S 138.95304°E; Tanunda 34.50821°S 138.98011°E; Nuriootpa 34.47996°S 138.99690°E; Angaston 34.50253°S 139.04545°E
- Use: Cycling, Hiking
- Surface: sealed
- Website: https://www.barossa.com/the-barossa-trail

The Barossa Trail is a 40 kilometres (25 mi) cycling and walking path through the Barossa Valley in South Australia, opened in May 2014. Much of the Barossa Trail follows the Barossa Valley railway line, but is not a rail trail as part of the railway was still operating at the time it was built. As it is not on the railway formation, it has more undulations than a true rail trail would have. The part near Rowland Flat is away from both the railway and main road. It has much sharper corners than would be expected on a rail trail.

Until 2019 the 27km between Gawler and Tanunda was named the Jack Bobridge Track, after a cyclist who grew up in the area. Following Bobridge's imprisonment that year for dealing recreational drugs, the Barossa Council extended the name of the rest of the route to that section.

== Route description ==
The Barossa Trail begins adjacent to the railway line at Ann Milroy Lane in Kalbeeba on the eastern outskirts of Gawler. It follows the railway line through Sandy Creek, then crosses the railway using a short section of Cockatoo Lane. The track resumes adjacent to the Barossa Valley Way through gum trees, then over a hill and descends into Lyndoch. From Lyndoch, the track follows the Barossa Valley Way, then next to the railway line to Rowland Flat.

From Rowland Flat, the track is away from the road and railway, through vineyards and bushland near the North Para River and the Jacob's Creek visitor centre. This section has short steep sections and sharper corners, but rewarding scenery. From St Hallett Road to Tanunda, the track is again adjacent to the Barossa Valley Way.

The track continues from Tanunda to Nuriootpa then Angaston. This section was already known as the Barossa Trail prior to the decision to change the rest of the trail's name to match in 2019. The section between Nuriootpa and Angaston is on the former railway alignment, so has railway grades.

The section from Tanunda to Nuriootpa is mostly flat. From Nuriootpa, The Barossa Trail follows the former railway alignment through vineyards and past the Adbri factory. It provides views across the valley from the eastern side, then passes through a cutting for the final descent to Angaston.
