= Job Harris =

Australian businessman and gold miner (1840–1882)

Job Harris (22 July 1840 – 12 January 1882) was a store keeper, post master, hotelier, gold miner and South Australian prominently associated with the discovery of gold at the Barossa Goldfields, the largest gold rush in the colony of South Australia.

Portrait Job Harris

== Early life ==
Job Harris was born in Neath, Glamorgan, Wales on 22 July 1840, the eldest son of George (1810–1851) and Mary Harris (1814–1890). Harris also had an older sister Ann (1838–1927) and four younger siblings Elizabeth (1843–1845), Hannah (1845–1868), David (1847–1885) and Benjamin George (1851–1936).

The Harris family of George, Mary and four children Ann, Job, Hannah and David migrated to South Australia on the Providence which left Swansea, Wales on 24 May 1849 and arrived at Port Adelaide on 16 September 1849.

George Harris was a brick maker employed at Burra. He died on 10 January 1851 while Mary was expecting their 6th child. Benjamin George Harris was born near the smelting works at Burra Burra, on 2 June 1851.

Mary Harris remarried in South Australia in 1857 to James Davies, a Welshman who had previously been married with a family. They moved to Bertha, Willaston, South Australia where James built and operated lime kilns. This is where Harris was on the committee of the Gawler Cricket Club in 1861.

== Adult life ==
In April 1862, Harris advertised that he had purchased the Willaston Stores from Mrs Gilbert and in 1864 he operated the first Post Office at Willaston from his store.

Job Harris married Mary Hattam (1843–1923) at St Peter's Church, Williamstown, South Australia on 2 September 1862. Mary's father, Samuel Hattam, a Cornishman, was a blacksmith at Williamstown.

Job and Mary Harris had 7 children: Elizabeth (1864–1869), Louisa Jane (Harris) Parmenter (1865–1957), Alfred James (1867–1957), Herbert George (1870–1952), Elizabeth Saunders (Harris) Stevens (1872–1945), William Lewis (1875–1966) and Mary (Harris) Vivian (1880–1962).

1867 saw Job Harris apply to the Adelaide Licensing Bench for a licence to operate the Sandy Creek Hotel, Sandy Creek.

Job and Mary Harris continued to run the Sandy Creek Hotel, their first daughter Elizabeth dying there on 14 July 1869 of typhoid fever. The stables at the hotel burnt down on Sunday, 12 September 1869, thought to be due to a broken lantern and in 1870, Harris had a saddle and bridle, as well as a mare left in his charge stolen by a boy who worked for him. New Year's Day of 1878 saw sports being held in Job Harris's paddock at Sandy Creek.

Job Harris died on 12 January 1882 at Sandy Creek, of ulcers of the stomach. The Gawler newspaper of Friday, 13 January 1882 reported "Death of Mr. Job Harris. – Last night Mr. Job Harris, of the Sandy Creek Hotel somewhat unexpectedly passed away. Deceased had been about 14 years at the hotel, and formerly resided at Willaston. He was well known, and much respected." The funeral left the Sandy Creek Hotel on Saturday, 14 January 1882 for the Willaston General Cemetery.

== Siblings ==
Sadly, in 1868, Harris's younger surviving sister Hannah, died at Bertha, Willaston. She is buried in the Willaston Cemetery in the Davies/Harris family plot.

Harris's older sister, Ann Harris married William Lewis (1835–1903) in 1869 at Cambrian Cottage, Bertha, the residence of her mother, (Mary Davies). William Lewis was also a Welsh immigrant who had operated the lime kilns in partnership with Ann's stepfather, James Davies. William and Ann Lewis resided at Brighton where William established lime kilns in 1880 and began the Brighton Cement Works, which were officially opened on 12 December 1882. William Lewis produced the first Portland cement in Australia.

David Harris, younger brother of Harris, married Mary Rebecca Pankhurst at Buchsfeldt, South Australia in 1872. His occupation was listed as a lime burner. In 1875, David was listed as an employee of the Virginia Gold Mining Company, Northern Territory and was a passenger on the SS Gothenburg in February 1875. The steamship left Darwin en route to Adelaide when a cyclone-strength storm was encountered and the SS Gothenburg sank off the north Queensland coast on 24 February 1875. Only 22 men, including David, survived the wreck while 98-112 people died, many being high profile South Australian dignitaries and civil servants. Harris Street in Millner, Darwin is named after David Harris. In 1876, David and his wife Mary moved to Green's Plains (near Kadina, South Australia) as a pioneering farmer. They had 8 children. David died 23 May 1885 and is buried at Kadina.

Benjamin George Harris, Harris's only sibling born in South Australia, also moved to Green's Plains in 1876 to pioneer and adjoining 1,500 acre scrub block to David's land. Benjamin married Eliza Rosa Harvey in 1876 and they lived at first in a pine and daub home. Benjamin and Eliza had 10 children and Eliza died in 1900 at Kadina and Benjamin died in 1936 at Blackwood, South Australia. Both are buried at Kadina.

== Barossa Goldfields ==
South Australians, along with people from all over the world, had 'rushed' to the rich Victorian goldfields in 1851 and this prompted the South Australian government to offer a reward of £1,000 for major gold finds in this colony. Again in 1863, the South Australian government offered a fresh reward of £5,000 for a payable goldfield.

It was not until October 1868 that "The South Australian Register" of 6 October as well as "The South Australian Advertiser" reported that "On Thursday week last [24th September] a party, including Mr. Job Harris, of the Sandy Creek Hotel, Mr. Gower, and others, set out to explore in the unsold land beyond the Cockatoo Valley. Quietly they set to work in a spot where from previous knowledge of the ground they had reason to look for the colour of gold. They had not been at work many days before they had accumulated a nice little show of nuggets and dust. The first hole was sunk some thirteen feet before their operations attracted much notice." A claim was taken out on 25 September 1868 by Job Harris, one mile north of the South Para River, about five miles from Gawler by the course of the river, and about five miles south-west from Lyndoch. "Mr Job Harris's party made their first finding a few yards away from the water in one of the very few flats to be found along the Spike. After going a depth of 13 feet they have left it for the present and joined in the scramble for gold close alongside the waterline."

The South Australian Advertiser next reported "Mr. Job Harris, landlord of the Sandy Creek Hotel, and claimant of the Government reward for the discovery of a new goldfield, called upon us on Monday morning with 1.25 oz. of beautiful gold."

Job Harris was not immediately paid the reward for discovering the goldfield because as "The South Australian Advertiser" reported on 8 October 1868, "...he will have to wait till the conditions attached to the reward are fulfilled, those conditions being that 10,000 ozs. of gold shall be raised, and 500 licences taken out within six months." Eventually enough gold was found to make it possible for Job Harris to claim his reward but only "£750 was awarded for the discovery of the Barossa diggings [and] was given to Mr. Job Harris and party, six in all, each receiving £125."

The largest gold rush ever seen in South Australia began and by the end of the first week after the reports, about 1,500 men were estimated to be on the Barossa goldfields, and by the end of October 1868, it was estimated that 5,000 people were at the diggings. Most of the early diggers lived in basic tents and they had constructed much of their bedding from young wattle trees. Workshops, hotels, stores and booths were soon erected but water was always a problem.

On Friday, 9 October 1868, a new company known as the "Yatta Creek Gold Reefing Venture" with 25 shares was formed at the offices of Messrs. Cullen & Wigley, Solicitors, King William Street, Adelaide. Messrs. Job Harris and Mr. Win. McMinn held shares, "free of calls, as those gentlemen started the enterprise".

In 1873, Job Harris, I. H. Duxbury, John Jones and A. Edwards were the promoters of a new mining company, the "Gawler Gold Mining Company", Hissey's Gully, Barossa with a nominal capital of £12,000. Twelve thousand shares of (£1) one pound each were to be issued, whereof 6,000 shares were to be issued as fully paid-up, and subject to no pecuniary liability to the Promoters.

Two new towns, Yatta and Victoria Hill as well as the private township of Barossa which had been established in 1865, were soon booming and contained hotels, butchers and blacksmiths. Barossa had seven hotels, seven general stores and a dozen other establishments as well as an Institute, school and post office. It remained populated until the early 1900s.

By the end of January 1869, a number of crushing companies had been formed "The South Australia Advertiser" reported on 29 December 1869 that "On Monday, December 27, the English and Scottish Bank purchased for £500 a lump of gold in the form of a cup, weighing 130 ozs. 8 dwts., all of which came from the claim of Messrs. Job Harris and company, and was crushed out at the new machine of the Victoria Gold and Quartz Crushing Company." "During its first 16 months the Barossa goldfield had produced nearly 11,000 ounces of gold worth £42,000. Some other interesting figures were published on 24th September [1870] when it was revealed that the Barossa field employed a total of 465 diggers, eight carters, ten men at the crushers, one doctor, one policeman, five storekeepers, seven innkeepers, two bakers, two shoemakers and four butchers. There were also 150 women on the field as well as some 300 children. By the end of 1871, the estimated value of gold production from the Barossa goldfield was £180,000." By 1873, the Gawler Gold Mining Company was still operating on the goldfields where Job Harris was doing his utmost to make a success of it...

A further small discovery was made in 1880, new companies formed in 1881 and further interest shown in it in 1886 when new technology was available. No gold was officially produced from the Barossa Goldfield in 1887 and most of the diggers had moved away. By 1900, despite small discoveries, the gold rush was considered to have ended.
