= Pterostylis psammophila =

Two-bristle greenhood

Conservation status
- Critically endangered (EPBC Act)

Scientific classification
- Kingdom: Plantae
- Clade: Tracheophytes
- Clade: Angiosperms
- Clade: Monocots
- Order: Asparagales
- Family: Orchidaceae
- Subfamily: Orchidoideae
- Tribe: Cranichideae
- Genus: Pterostylis
- Species: P. psammophila

Binomial name
- Pterostylis psammophila D.L.Jones R.J.Bates

Synonyms
- Oligochaetochilus psammophilus D.L.Jones

Species of orchid

Pterostylis psammophila, commonly known as the two-bristle greenhood, is a plant in the orchid family Orchidaceae and is endemic to South Australia. Both flowering and non-flowering plants have a rosette of leaves and flowering plants have translucent green and white flowers with an insect-like labellum, but the flowers are only open for a few days.

== Description ==
Pterostylis psammophila is a terrestrial, perennial, deciduous, herb with an underground tuber and a rosette of between six and sixteen overlapping leaves. The leaves are up to leaves are up to 50 mm (2 in) long and have a serrated edge. Flowering plants have a rosette at the base of the flowering stem but the leaves are usually withered by flowering time. The flowers are green or translucent white but are short-lived and borne on a flowering stem usually about 150 mm (6 in) high. The dorsal sepal and petals form a hood or "galea" over the column, the lateral sepals turn downwards and the labellum is insect-like with two long bristles on the "head" end. Flowering occurs between late August and October.

== Taxonomy and naming ==
The two-bristle greenhood was first formally described in 2007 by D.L.Jones who gave it the name Oligochaeochilus psammophilus. The description was published in The Orchadian from a specimen collected near Cockatoo Valley. In 2008, Robert Bates changed the name to Pterostylis psammophila. The specific epithet (psammophila) is derived from the Ancient Greek ψάμμος (psámmos), meaning “sand” and φίλος (phílos), meaning “dear one" or "friend”.

== Distribution ==
Pterostylis psammophila is only known from two populations near Lyndoch.

== Conservation ==
Pterostylis psammophila is classified as "critically endangered" Environment Protection and Biodiversity Conservation Act 1999 (EPBC Act). The species is threatened by illegal collection, weed invasion and grazing by livestock and rabbits.
