= Gomersal, South Australia =

Gomersal New Mecklenburg (Barossa German)
- Town
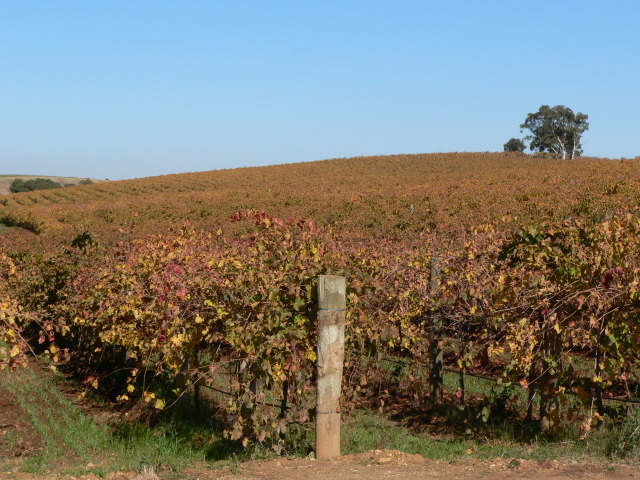
- Vineyards in Autumn 2006

- Coordinates: 34.54°S 138.90°E
- Country: Australia
- State: South Australia
- LGA: Light Regional Council
- Location: 6 km (3.7 mi) SW of Tanunda
- Established: 1864

Government
  - State electorate: Schubert
  - Federal division: Barker

Population
  - Total: 60 (SAL 2021)
- Gazetted: 1918
Localities around Gomersal
Shea-Oak Log	Seppeltsfield	Tanunda
	Gomersal
Rosedale	Lyndoch	Rowland Flat

Gomersal is a locality on the western side of the Barossa Valley in South Australia. It is between the Sturt Highway (which mostly bypasses the valley to the west and north) and the North Para River and town of Tanunda on the valley floor. Prior to 1918, it was known as New Mecklenburg, but like many others, the name was changed due to anti-German sentiment in World War I. The new name was derived from the town of Gomersal, West Yorkshire.

Gomersal Road was developed in the 1990s as a freight bypass route to assist trucks to avoid the major town centres. It connects Barossa Valley Way south of Tanunda near Bethany Road west over the hills to the Sturt Highway south of Shea-Oak Log.

Gomersal school (opened 1929) and post office are both closed, as improved road transport provides connections to the surrounding towns. The Bethlehem Lutheran Church of Schoenborn is still active on Gomersal Road. The Gomersal (formerly Neu-Mecklenburg) Good Shepherd Lutheran church was first built in 1864, the building replaced in 1925, and closed in 1970 when the congregation merged into Trinity Church, Rosedale.
