= Barossa Goldfields =

- Town
- Coordinates: 34.65°S 138.83°E
- Country: Australia
- State: South Australia
- LGA: Barossa Council
- Location: 8 km (5.0 mi) west of Williamstown

Government
  - State electorate: Schubert
  - Federal division: Barker

Population
  - Total: 63 (SAL 2021)
- Postcode: 5351
Localities around Barossa Goldfields
Kalbeeba	Cockatoo Valley
	Barossa Goldfields	Williamstown
Yattalunga

Barossa Goldfields is a locality in South Australia. It is on the southwestern side of the Barossa Council, bounded on the southwest by the South Para River. The locality is now essentially rural, but is named for the gold mining and prospecting in the second half of the nineteenth century in the area, on the creeks descending to the South Para River. Part of that area is now preserved as part of the Para Wirra Recreation Park. A total of 778 kg of gold was produced in the area.

Gold was discovered in October 1868 by Job Harris, a publican at Sandy Creek. Within the first week, 2000 people had rushed to the area and 4000 within a few weeks. The town of Barossa was established and survived until the 1950s. A second town of Victoria was established in 1869. By late 1870, the rush had subsided and only 100 miners remained with others having moved on to other fields. There were resurgences in 1887 and 1889 and companies formed to dig for deeper gold leads. None of the companies were successful, despite constructing a large gold battery and tramways to supply it. Alluvial deposits were reworked during the 1930s depression.
