= Rosedale, South Australia =

Rosedale Rosenthal
- Town
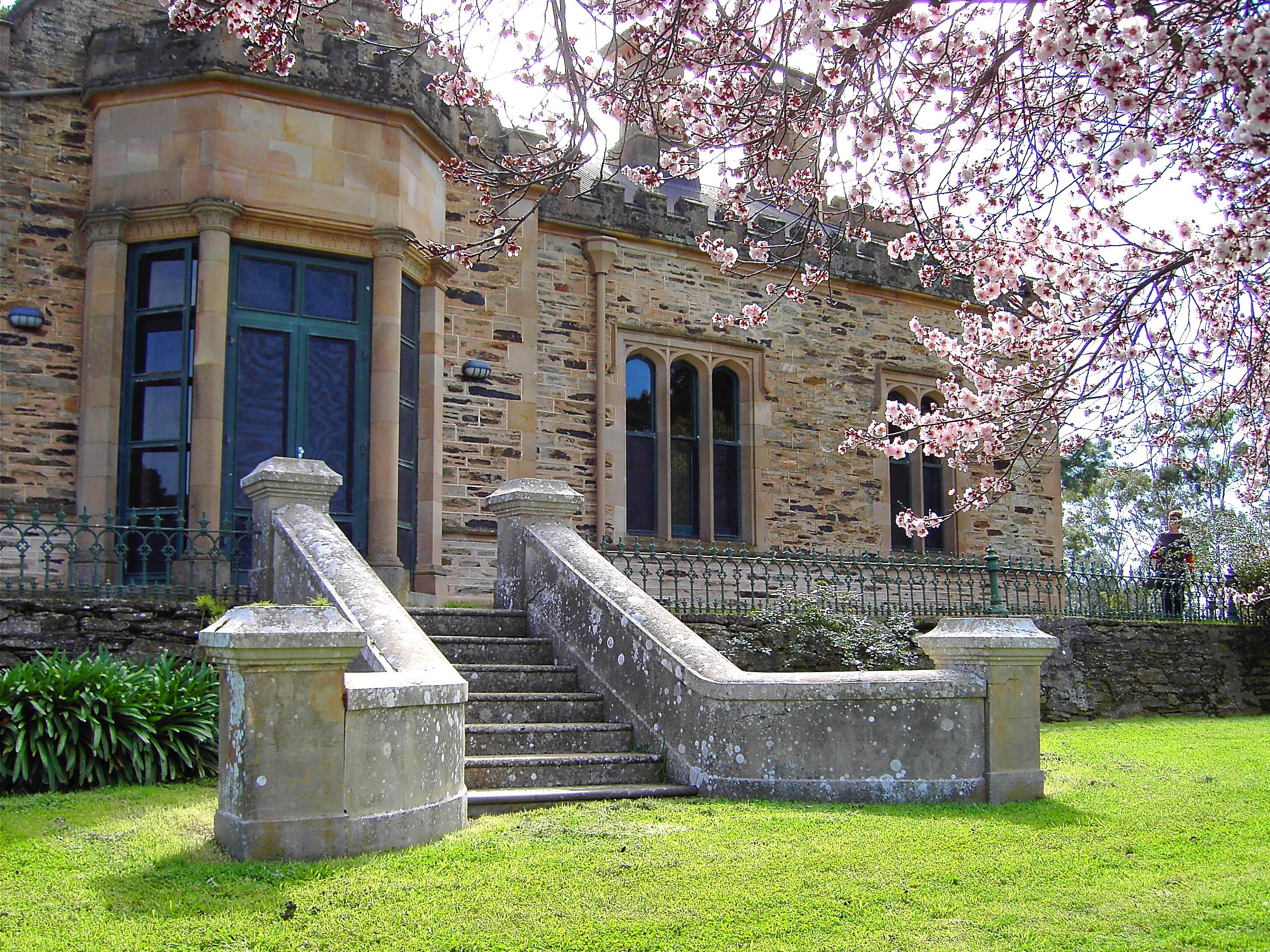
- Holland House

- Coordinates: 34.55°S 138.85°E
- Country: Australia
- State: South Australia
- LGAs: Light regional council; Barossa Council
- Location: 14 km (8.7 mi) NE of Gawler; 10 km (6.2 mi) NW of Lyndoch; 15 km (9.3 mi) SW of Tanunda; 56 km (35 mi) NNE of Adelaide
- Established: 1849

Government
  - State electorate: Schubert
  - Federal division: Barker

Population
  - Total: 190 (SAL 2021)
- Postcode: 5350
- Mean max temp: 22.6 °C (72.7 °F)
- Mean min temp: 10.0 °C (50.0 °F)
- Annual rainfall: 466.9 mm (18.38 in)
Localities around Rosedale
Kingsford	Shea-Oak Log	Gomersal
	Rosedale
Concordia	Sandy Creek	Lyndoch

Rosedale is a small town in the south western Barossa Valley in South Australia. Prior to renaming placenames of enemy origin in 1918, Rosedale was named Rosenthal (German: [ˈʁoːzn̩ˌtaːl]).

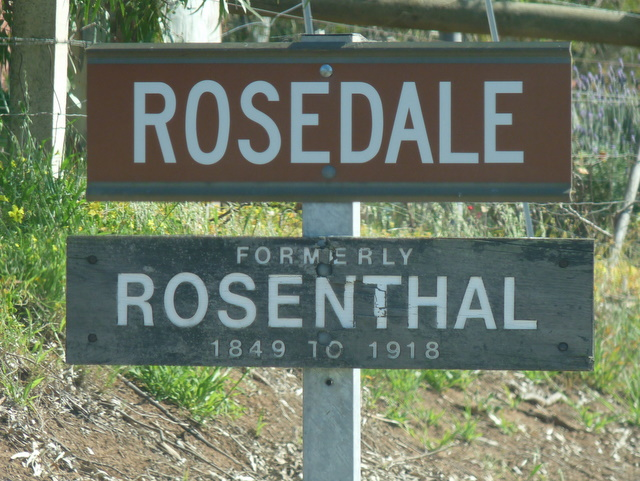
Rosedale sign showing former name of Rosenthal

The locality of Rosedale spans the North Para River which is the boundary between two local government areas. North of the river is in the Light Regional Council. South of it is in the Barossa Council. The Turretfield Research Centre is on the north bank of the river just outside the township.

== Climate ==
Climate data for Rosedale, elevation 116 m (381 ft), (1991–2020 normals, extremes 1962–2019)

Climate data for Rosedale
Month	Jan	Feb	Mar	Apr	May	Jun	Jul	Aug	Sep	Oct	Nov	Dec	Year
Record high °C (°F)	47.2 (117.0)	46.3 (115.3)	43.4 (110.1)	38.1 (100.6)	31.0 (87.8)	27.0 (80.6)	26.0 (78.8)	30.0 (86.0)	32.6 (90.7)	38.6 (101.5)	44.1 (111.4)	47.0 (116.6)	47.2 (117.0)
Mean daily maximum °C (°F)	31.2 (88.2)	30.9 (87.6)	27.6 (81.7)	23.5 (74.3)	19.1 (66.4)	15.8 (60.4)	15.1 (59.2)	16.2 (61.2)	18.9 (66.0)	22.8 (73.0)	26.3 (79.3)	28.9 (84.0)	23.0 (73.4)
Mean daily minimum °C (°F)	15.4 (59.7)	15.5 (59.9)	13.0 (55.4)	10.6 (51.1)	8.1 (46.6)	6.2 (43.2)	5.5 (41.9)	5.4 (41.7)	6.7 (44.1)	8.3 (46.9)	11.3 (52.3)	13.4 (56.1)	10.0 (50.0)
Record low °C (°F)	3.3 (37.9)	4.9 (40.8)	2.4 (36.3)	0.6 (33.1)	−1.4 (29.5)	−3.3 (26.1)	−2.5 (27.5)	−2.2 (28.0)	−2.3 (27.9)	−1.3 (29.7)	0.5 (32.9)	2.2 (36.0)	−3.3 (26.1)
Average precipitation mm (inches)	21.5 (0.85)	19.9 (0.78)	22.6 (0.89)	32.2 (1.27)	45.5 (1.79)	62.4 (2.46)	60.8 (2.39)	55.7 (2.19)	57.4 (2.26)	37.1 (1.46)	32.5 (1.28)	29.9 (1.18)	476.2 (18.75)
Average precipitation days (≥ 0.2 mm)	4.5	3.7	5.1	7.1	12.0	14.7	17.0	15.5	13.6	9.3	7.3	6.4	116.2
Average afternoon relative humidity (%)	36	36	39	47	60	71	70	65	64	54	42	40	52
Source: Australian Bureau of Meteorology (humidity 1991–2010)
