= Concordia, South Australia =

Concordia South Australia
- Coordinates: 34°35′S 138°48′E
- Population: 153 (SAL 2021)
- Postcode(s): 5118
- Location: 40 km (25 mi) N of Adelaide city centre
- LGA(s): Barossa Council
- Region: Barossa Valley
- State electorate(s): Light
- Federal division(s): Spence
Localities around Concordia:
Hewett	Kingsford	Rosedale
Willaston	Concordia
Gawler East	Kalbeeba	Sandy Creek

Concordia is a locality at the western end of the Barossa Valley, South Australia, situated 5 km ENE of Gawler.

== History ==
Concordia was a subdivision of section 465, Hundred of Barossa in 1877, and named after Concordia School, which had been opened by Frederick Sickovich in 1861 or earlier. It is situated north of the Barossa Valley Way, between Gawler and Sandy Creek and south of the North Para River. The current boundaries were set in 2003.

Manning asserts that it was named for Concordia, the Roman Goddess of Peace and Harmony, and is very commonly used in connection with Lutheran institutions.

The Concordia cemetery is located on the west side of Teusner Road.

A housing development is set to be unleashed in Concordia for residential purposes. Proposals are being mooted to extend the existing Gawler line via the disused line to cater as a quick and reliable public transport option.
