= Sandy Creek Conservation Park =

Protected area in South Australia

- IUCN category III (natural monument or feature)
- Location within South Australia
- Location: South Australia, Lyndoch & Sandy Creek
- Nearest city: Lyndoch
- Coordinates: 34°36′45″S 138°51′34″E
- Area: 1.58 km^{2} (0.61 sq mi)
- Established: 7 October 1965
- Governing body: Department for Environment and Water
- Website: Official website

Sandy Creek Conservation Park, formerly the Sandy Creek National Park, is a protected area located in the Australian state of South Australia in the localities of Lyndoch and Sandy Creek about 42 kilometres (26 mi) north-east of the state capital of Adelaide and about 3 kilometres (1.9 mi) west-south-west of the town centre in Sandy Creek.

The conservation park consists of land in sections 72, 317 and 319 and in allotments 10, 50 and 202 in the cadastral unit of the Hundred of Barossa.

The land first received protected area status in respect to section 72 as a wildlife reserve under the Crown Lands Act 1929 proclaimed on 7 October 1965. On 25 May 1967, sections 317 and 319 were declared as a national park under the National Parks Act 1966 and on 9 November 1967 along with section 72 were named as the Sandy Creek National Park. On 27 April 1972, the national park was reconstituted as the Sandy Creek Conservation Park under the National Parks and Wildlife Act 1972. Since 1972, the following land from the Hundred of Barossa has been added to the conservation park - allotment 10 on 11 April 1991, allotment 50 on 8 September 1994 and allotment 202 on 19 January 2006. As of 2019, it covered an area of 1.58 square kilometres (0.61 sq mi).

In 1980, the conservation park was described as follows:

The topography of this park is one of gently undulating sandy hills and plains dissected by creeks, elevation ranging from 185m to 235m above sea level. The major vegetation associations at Sandy Creek consist of various combinations of Eucalyptus fasciculosa and Callitris preissii. The structural formation ranges from low woodland to open forest while the understorey is variable. Abandoned vineyards and small discrete areas of Eucalyptus leucoxylon and E. odorata also occur in the park…

Lomandra multiflora which is an endangered plant in South Australia and three rare plant species… occur in the park. Macropus fuliginosus (western grey kangaroo) is present, while 120 species of birds, including five species of cuckoos have been recorded… The occurrence together of birds from both sclerophyll forests and from mallee areas is ecologically significant.

The conservation park is classified as an IUCN Category III protected area. In 1980, it was listed on the now-defunct Register of the National Estate.

== See also ==
- Protected areas of South Australia
