= Yattalunga, South Australia =

Yattalunga
- Suburb
- Coordinates: 34.680°S 138.807°E
- Country: Australia
- State: South Australia
- City: Adelaide
- LGA: City of Playford

Government
  - State electorate: Schubert
  - Federal division: Spence

Population
  - Total: 319 (SAL 2021)
- Postcode: 5114
Suburbs around Yattalunga
Bibaringa	Kalbeeba	Barossa Goldfields
Uleybury	Yattalunga	Williamstown
One Tree Hill	Sampson Flat	Humbug Scrub

Yattalunga is a northern suburb of Adelaide, South Australia. It is the eastern in the City of Playford. Yattalunga is east of One Tree Hill, between the Gawler–One Tree Hill Road and the South Para River. The road runs near the top of the ridge separating the South Para River gorge from the Adelaide Plains.

The eastern part of Yattalunga includes most of the Para Wirra Recreation Park.

The name of the suburb is drawn from the name of a historic homestead, which in turn was derived from Yertala or Yattala meaning cascade, waterfall of creek and unga or nga meaning place or locality in a local Australian Aboriginal language, according to state government records citing Norman Tindale in 1949.

== Demographics ==
The 2016 Census by the Australian Bureau of Statistics counted 313 persons in Yattalunga on census night. Of these, 166 (53.4%) were male and 145 (46.3%) were female. The majority of residents 226 (72.4%) was born in Australia. 40 (12.8%) were born in England.

The median age of Yattalunga residents is 46. Children aged 0–14 years made up 12.0% of the population and people aged 65 years and over made up 17.5% of the population.
