= Kalbeeba =

- Town
- Coordinates: 34°36′20″S 138°47′40″E
- Country: Australia
- State: South Australia
- LGA: Barossa Council
- Location: 4 km (2.5 mi) east of Gawler

Government
  - State electorate: Schubert
  - Federal division: Spence

Population
  - Total: 411 (SAL 2021)
- Postcode: 5118
Localities around Kalbeeba
Gawler East	Concordia	Sandy Creek
Gawler South	Kalbeeba	Cockatoo Valley
Bibaringa	Yattalunga	Barossa Goldfields

Kalbeeba is a locality east of Gawler in South Australia. It is named for a former railway station on the Barossa Valley railway line. The northern boundary of Kalbeeba is now the Barossa Valley Way, and its southwestern boundary is the South Para River.

The Concordia brigade of the Country Fire Service is based in the northeastern corner of Kalbeeba. The western end of the Barossa Trail, a shared walking and cycling track, is adjacent to the railway line in Kalbeeba.
