= Sandy Creek, South Australia =

Sandy Creek South Australia
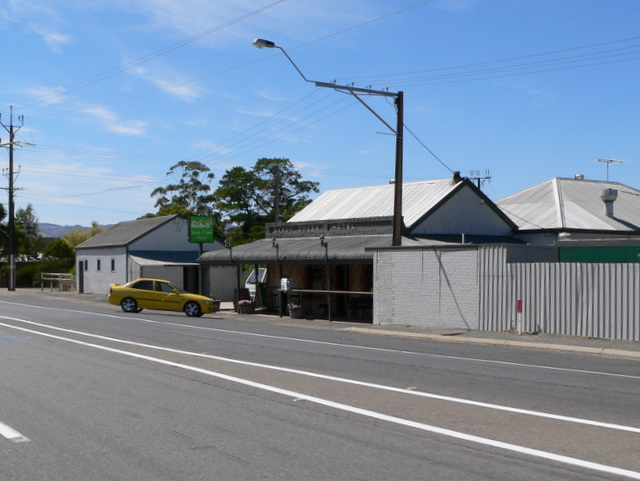
- Sandy Creek Hotel

- Coordinates: 34°36′19″S 138°49′39″E
- Population: 360 (SAL 2021)
- Postcode(s): 5350
- Location: 49 km (30 mi) NE of Adelaide; 6 km (4 mi) E of Gawler
- LGA(s): Barossa Council
- Region: Barossa Light and Lower North
- County: Adelaide
- State electorate(s): Schubert
- Federal division(s): Barker
Localities around Sandy Creek:
Concordia	Concordia; Rosedale	Lyndoch
Kalbeeba	Sandy Creek	Lyndoch
Kalbeeba	Cockatoo Valley	Lyndoch
- Footnotes: Adjoining localities

Sandy Creek is a town in South Australia. The town is situated approximately 6 kilometres east of Gawler and is the last town passed through before reaching Barossa Valley at Lyndoch.

The Sandy Creek Conservation Park is nearby as is Tindo, a members only gated nudist enclave with several permanent residents and a fully functioning caravan park.

== Geography ==
The surrounding fields are often populated by wild kangaroos and a significant brown snake population. Nearby Cockatoo Valley is named for the flocks of corellas, a native parrot, which denude the pine trees and feed on the grain crops. Daytime temperatures can reach as high as 47 degrees Celsius (117 degrees f) and often exceed 40 degrees. A Green belt between Sandy Creek and Gawler has been maintained and is policy, however this is being steadily nibbled away as sub-divisions are approved in order to meet the increasing housing stock demands required to service Defence Force, vineyard and mining labour needs.

== History ==
The Sandy Creek Hotel, which has been open over 120 years, is a famous watering hole. The hotel is best known for the prodigious amounts of alcohol served to the US soldiers during World War II, who had a camp in close proximity. Several of these soldiers have returned in later years and have placed a plaque within the hotel in memory of the good times they experienced there and of fallen comrades. It is believed this pub still holds the South Australian record for the greatest amount of beer served in a single week. This was set, unsurprisingly, after the announcement of the ceasefire at the end of World War II.

Sandy Creek was served by a station on the Barossa Valley railway line, built in 1911, however the station was closed in 1927.

The Sandy Creek Cricket Club recorded its first ever Para Districts Cricket Club Grade 1 premiership in the 2006/2007 season and boasts that former Australian cricketer Darren Lehmann had been a junior player. Ryan Harris (opening bowler for Australia) is also an ex player. This team now plays in a turf competition in the Barossa and surrounds, and has an upgraded oval. It has several senior and junior teams and has more members than the actual population of the town, drawing its players mainly from Williamstown and Gawler. The Sandy Creek Golf Club is a well regarded and challenging course. The club has a deep fresh water dam opposite Curdnatta Oval which for many years was the unofficial local swimming hole after a hot day of cricket.

Sandy Creek is also the nearest town to Rosedale and the Turretfield Research Centre – the home of Matilda, Australia's first cloned sheep. Sandy Creek is also the name of the small local spring which flows into the North Para River. Sandy Creek originates on "The Glen", a historical property on MacCullum Rd, which is still owned by the family of former Federal Senator and Australian Democrat, the late David Vigor. McLeod's Daughters, an Australian soap opera, was filmed locally and much of the filming was done on location using the local farms and dirt roads as background. The locals were often recruited as extras or to supply livestock or for riding lessons.

Wine is increasingly cultivated locally and many hundreds of acres have been planted in the last ten years so that the traditional mixed and share farming has been replaced on many properties. The Concordia Volunteer Fire Brigade services the area as do the Lyndoch and Williamstown brigades.

The Sandy Creek Store, now closed, was the scene of a notorious murder in 1982. Much of the building was destroyed by fire not long after and only the Post Office boxes remain.

== Education ==
Sandy Creek Primary School has for several years maintained a cultural exchange with the Japanese community of Minami Aiki. There are bi-annual visits for the Sandy Creek students. Sandy Creek Primary and nearby Rosedale Primary sent students to Japan every even year for about 10 days. This Cultural Exchange Programme has seen a Japanese class visit the community every year since 1998 where they have been billeted with local families. In 2008 Sandy Creek sent its largest contingent of 21 students to Japan in its sixth visit to Japan and they were also billeted with local Minami Aiki families. Rosedale Primary School was closed by a policy to amalgamate schools into "Super Schools" by the Labor Government, after 156 years, in 2007.

== Notable people ==
Notable people from or who have lived in Sandy Creek include:

- Job Harris, publican and gold prospector
