= Rowland Flat, South Australia =

Rowland Flat
- Town
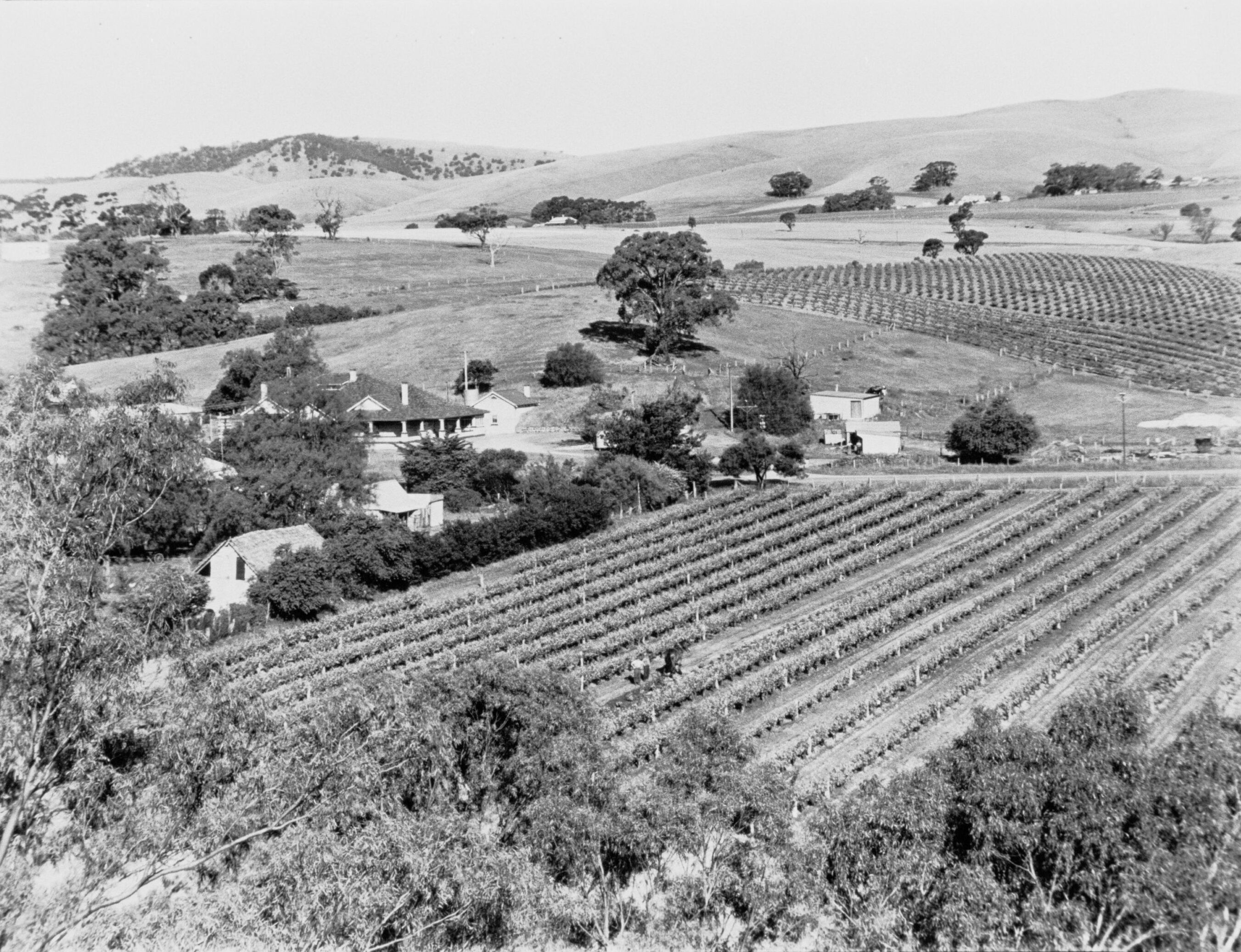
- Historic view of vineyards

- Coordinates: 34°35′0″S 138°56′0″E
- Country: Australia
- State: South Australia
- LGA: Barossa Council and Light Regional Council
- Location: 63 km (39 mi) North East of Adelaide via

Government
  - State electorate: Schubert
  - Federal division: Barker

Population
  - Total: 361 (2006 census)
- Postcode: 5352
Localities around Rowland Flat
Gomersal	Tanunda	Bethany
Lyndoch	Rowland Flat	Krondorf
Altona		Pewsey Vale

Rowland Flat, formerly Rowland's Flat and Rowlands Flat, is a small South Australian town in the Barossa Valley, located on the Barossa Valley Highway between Lyndoch and Tanunda.

== See also ==
- Barossa Valley (wine)
