= Para Wirra Conservation Park =

Protected area in South Australia

- IUCN category III (natural monument or feature)
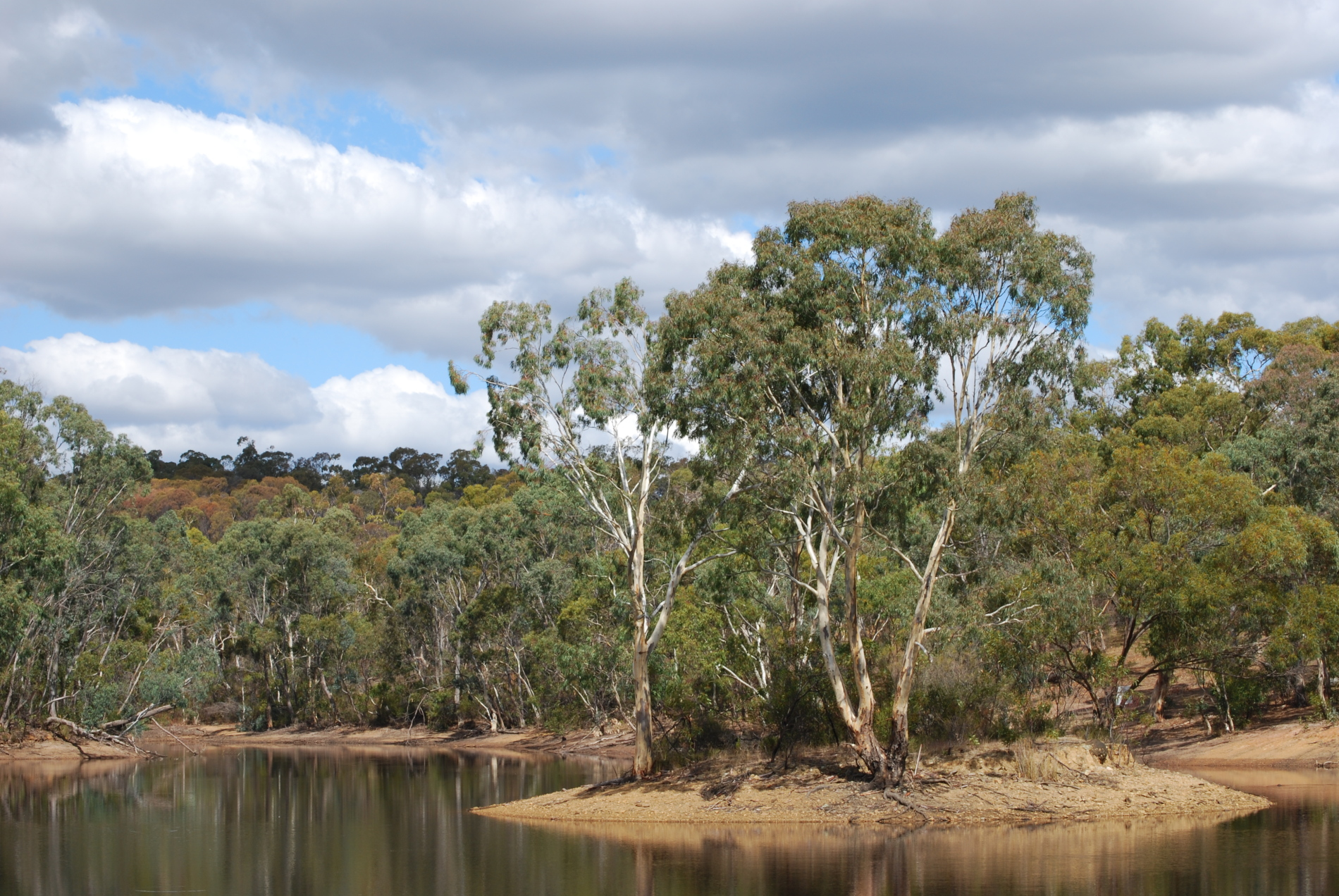
- Recreation park's lake and island

- Location within South Australia
- Location: South Australia
- Nearest city: Williamstown
- Coordinates: 34°40′50″S 138°49′48″E
- Area: 15.12 km^{2} (5.84 sq mi)
- Established: 21 June 1962
- Visitors: 60,000 (in 1993)
- Governing body: Department for Environment and Water
- Website: Official website

Para Wirra Conservation Park (formerly Para Wirra Recreation Park and Para Wirra National Park) is a 1,417-hectare (3,500-acre) protected area located in the foothills of the Mount Lofty Ranges in the northern end of the Adelaide metropolitan area in South Australia. The conservation park is part of a larger, 2,573-hectare (6,360-acre) block of contiguous native vegetation, the remainder of which is owned by PIRSA Forestry, SA Water and private landholders.

== Description ==
Para Wirra Conservation Park is located within the localities of Barossa Goldfields, Humbug Scrub, Williamstown and Yattalunga about 40 kilometres (25 miles) northeast of Adelaide CBD and 19 kilometres (12 miles) southeast of Gawler. The other close townships to the park are One Tree Hill to the south and Williamstown to the east.

=== Climate ===
The climate is Mediterranean maritime, influenced by south westerly winds with approximately 79% of the total rainfall occurring in the months from April to October, inclusive.

=== Topography ===
The park ranges in altitude from 137 metres (449 feet) above sea level immediately below Devil's Nose to just over 328 metres (1,076 feet) asl in the south eastern corner of the park. 76% of the park lies above the 24 metres (79 feet) contour. The landform of the park has been described as "a hilly upland with broad crests and dissected slopes" (Lauet et al, 1977). The northern section is a dissected plateau due to the South Para River, which has formed steep sloped valleys and narrow ridge tops; the central reserve area is an undissected plateau; and the southern area is dominated by Mack Creek.

=== Geology ===
Para Wirra Conservation Park lies entirely within an inlier of crystalline basement rock which extends southwards to Torrens Gorge. It is part of a more extensively exposed Precambrian rock mass, the oldest in the Mount Lofty Ranges. In the extreme west of the park there are undifferentiated metamorphic, mostly very micaceous rocks (schists), and gneisses. A zone of distinctive layered or banded quartz-feldspar rich rocks (gneisses) extends though the central portion of the park. In the extreme east there is another conspicuous rock type (augen gneiss) which is distinguished by the presence of "eye" structures (usually of feldspar) up to 2.5 cm in length, indicative of greater shearing.

=== Soils ===
There appear to be 3 principal soil types in the park: duplex soils with yellow-grey clay horizons in the southern section of the park, duplex soils with red clay horizions in the north and coarse textured uniform soils on the steep slopes and rockly ridges. The South Para River has limited soil developments and consists of alluvial sands and gravels. All soils are acidic.

=== Purpose ===
1. The preservation and management of wildlife
2. The preservation of historic sites, objects and structures of historic or scientific interest within the reserves
3. The preservation of features of geographical, natural and scientific interest
4. The destruction of dangerous weeds and the eradication or control of noxious weeds and exotic plants.
5. The control of vermin and exotic animals
6. The control and eradication of disease of animals and vegetation
7. The prevention and suppression of bushfires and other hazards
8. The encouragement of public use and enjoyment of reserves and education in, and a proper understanding and recognition of their purpose and significance

=== Importance ===
Para Wirra Conservation Park is not only important as an educational resource, but also for its conservation and recreation value. The boundary of the conservation park is contiguous with, and forms part of a 2,573 hectares (6,360 acres) block of native vegetation. As only twenty six percent (26%) of the Mount Lofty Ranges remains uncleared, a block of native vegetation of this size is important in terms of its representativeness of vegetation types, for the maintenance of diversity of animal and plant species, maintenance of water quality, and as a valuable recreational resource for the community. Para Wirra Conservation Park also provides a range of recreation opportunities consistent with its conservation significance and its importance and proximity to the expanding population of the northern metropolitan area.

== History ==
Land within the conservation park was first given protected area status on 21 June 1962 when it was proclaimed under the Crown Lands Act 1929 as the Para Wirra National Park, taking its name from the historic cadastral division which in lay, the Hundred of Para Wirra. The national park was officially opened on 24 September 1963 by the then Premier of South Australia, Sir Thomas Playford and was the second reserve in the state to be proclaimed as a national park. On 27 April 1972, the national park was reconstituted as a recreation park. This reconstitution reflected the park's role as a natural area catering for a wide range of recreational activities. On 2 November 2015, Environment Minister Ian Hunter announced that to better recognise and protect the recreation park's natural and heritage values, it would be upgraded to Conservation Park status. The recreation park was abolished on 19 May 2016 and on the same day, its land holding was constituted as the Para Wirra Conservation Park.

=== Prior Indigenous occupation ===
There are several sites of Aboriginal significance within the conservation park, which takes its name from the Kaurna words para meaning "river" and wirra meaning "forest", although the area is thought to have been occupied by the Peramangk tribe prior to European settlement. Recent findings are currently under investigation.

== Flora and fauna ==
=== Flora ===
Para Wirra Conservation Park is predominately covered in eucalyptus; however there is a wide variety of vegetation types. Some of these include: - Woodland - Open Woodland (low open woodland) - Low open forest - Closed scrub - Eucalyptus open scrub - Melaleuca uncinata open scrub - Melaleuca uncinata closed heath

=== Fauna ===
Para Wirra Conservation Park is crucial in conserving the native wildlife as much of it has been adversely affected by past agricultural and mining practices.

==== Mammals ====
Para Wirra Conservation Park supports a large population of western grey kangaroos and sometimes euros can be seen. Other native animals present but not frequently observed in the park include the small nocturnal yellow-footed antechinus, the ant and termite eating short-beaked echidna, the common ringtail possum and the brushtail possum.

==== Birds ====
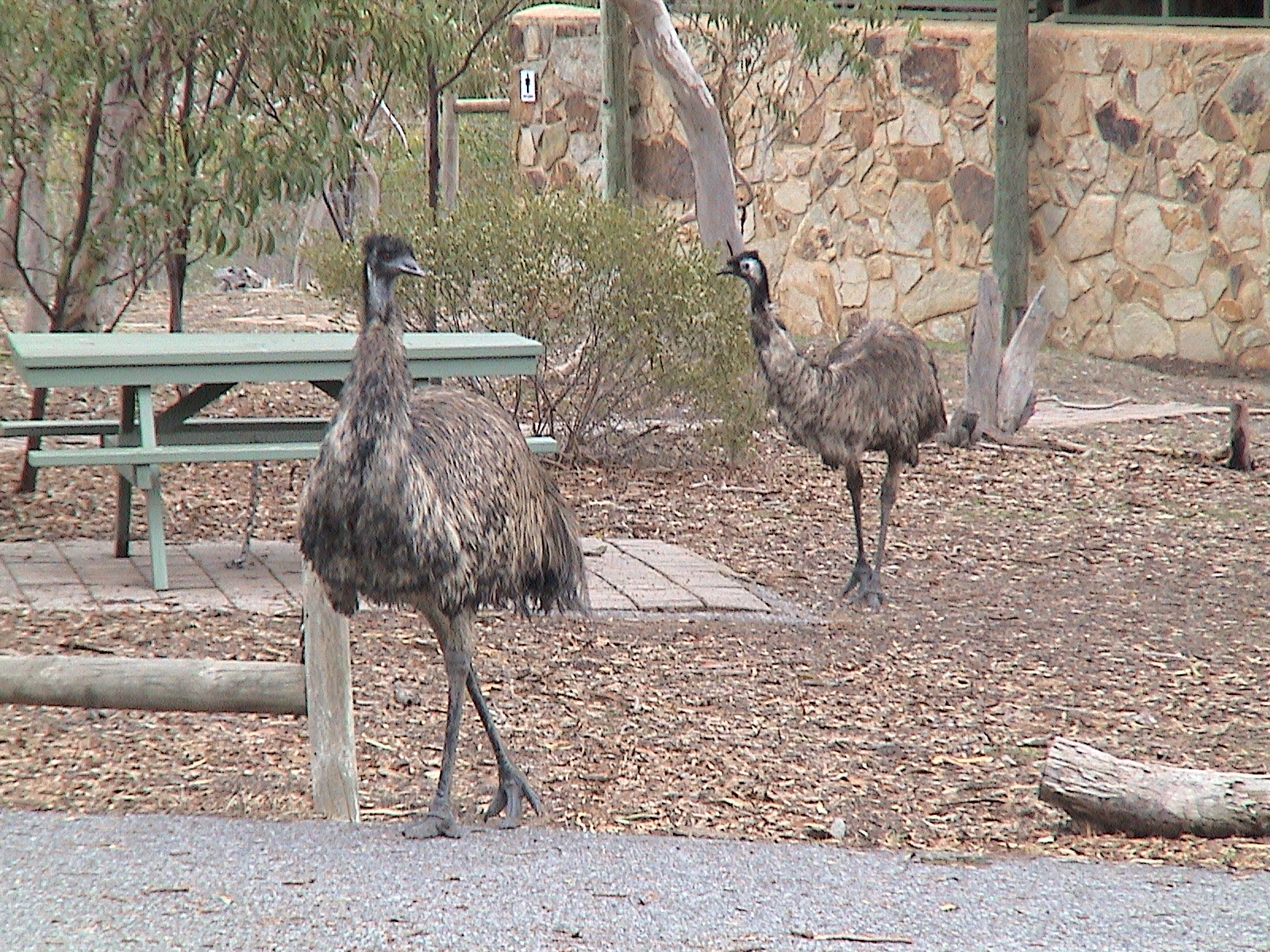
Emus at Parra Wirra, near the Park Office

There are over 120 species of birds recorded in the conservation park. These include the emu which was introduced into the park in 1967. In the aquatic areas of the park birdlife includes the grey teal, Australasian grebe and cormorants. The South Para river and nearby woodland areas support birds such as white-faced herons, black ducks, white-browed babblers, black-chinned honeyeaters and eastern spinebills. A range of birds occur throughout the park including such species as the common bronze wing, scarlet robin, black-faced cuckooshrike, restless flycatcher, grey currawong, little raven and the New Holland honeyeater. white-throated treecreepers, brown treecreepers and white-winged choughs are observed in the woodland areas while laughing kookaburras, red-rumped parrots and peaceful doves prefer the grass and woodland areas. In areas of dense groundcover family groups of superb fairywrens search for food. Flitting in the open areas are jacky winters and yellow-rumped thornbills.

==== Reptiles and Amphibians ====
There are 38 recorded reptiles and amphibians within Para Wirra Conservation Park. These include the long-necked tortoise, marbled gecko, tree dtella, bearded dragon, the shingle back, common grass skink and eastern blue tongue lizard. Only 5 species are amphibians: the brown tree frog, bull frog, spotted grass frog, Bibron's toadlet and brown froglet. The yellow faced whip snake, brown snake and the red-bellied black snake have also been sighted in the park.

== Recreational uses ==
=== Trails ===
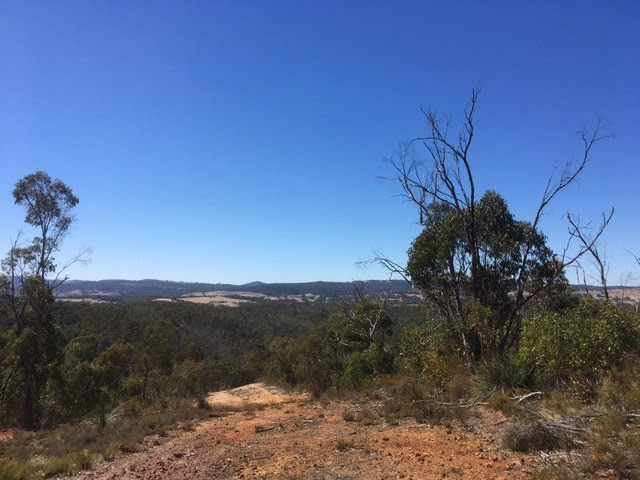
A track that is part of the Barossa Goldfields in the Parra Wirra Conservation Park.

Walking is one of the main ways to discover of Para Wirra Conservation Park. All trails are graded and timed. Trails include walks around the lakes, the goldfields, valleys, open woodland and rivers. More information can be obtained from pamphlets on Para Wirra Conservation Park from DEWNR. The contact details are listed below under the last heading in this article.

=== Programs in place ===
Programs in place at Para Wirra Conservation Park include: weed control (namely African bridal creeper and boneseed), vermin control (preventing over-grazing by feral goats and kangaroos), and revegetation programs aimed at re-establishing indigenous plant species.

=== Affiliated groups ===
Within the Para Wirra Conservation Park, affiliated groups working with Department for Environment and Water (DEW) park rangers include The Friends of Para Wirra (the major group), and the Barossa Goldfields Historical Society. Other groups which occasionally use the park for recreational purposes include Heart Foundation Walking, the Tintookies Orienteering Club, and the Astronomical Society of Australia.

=== Guided walks and school visits ===
School visits, guided walks and other functions such as celebrations, meetings and volunteer activities within the park can be arranged.

=== Conference Centre ===
The Friends of Para Wirra also have a small Conference Centre for hire, named the Ted and Molly Hughes Conference Centre after a husband and wife who are valuable life members of the Friends, having provided over 20 years’ service.

=== Educational value ===
Para Wirra Conservation Park's educational value is regarded as "invaluable", because of:

- The unobstructed astronomy/star gazing (park closes at sunset)
- Weed control with volunteer opportunities
- Preservation of native flora and fauna
- Natural bush setting
- Public education of bushfire management strategies
- Raising public awareness of having a sustainable balance between native areas and urban areas
- Adjoining Education Centre

=== Facilities ===
- Information Centre/ Ranger's Office
- Ted and Molly Hughes Conference Centre
- Barbecue sites
- Picnic areas e.g. lake area
- North Oval including a cricket pitch
- Walking trails
- Playground
- Toilets

=== Major attractions and activities ===
- Native wildlife
- Bush walking
- Sight seeing
- Goldfields heritage
- Bird watching
- Voluntary weed control (contact the Para Wirra Conservation Park Office and/or Friends group)
- Dusk walks
- Abundant flora, including some rare species such as orchids
- Motor bike riding and cycling on public roads only
- Walking pets on leash.
- Horse riding in a limited area

== Gallery ==
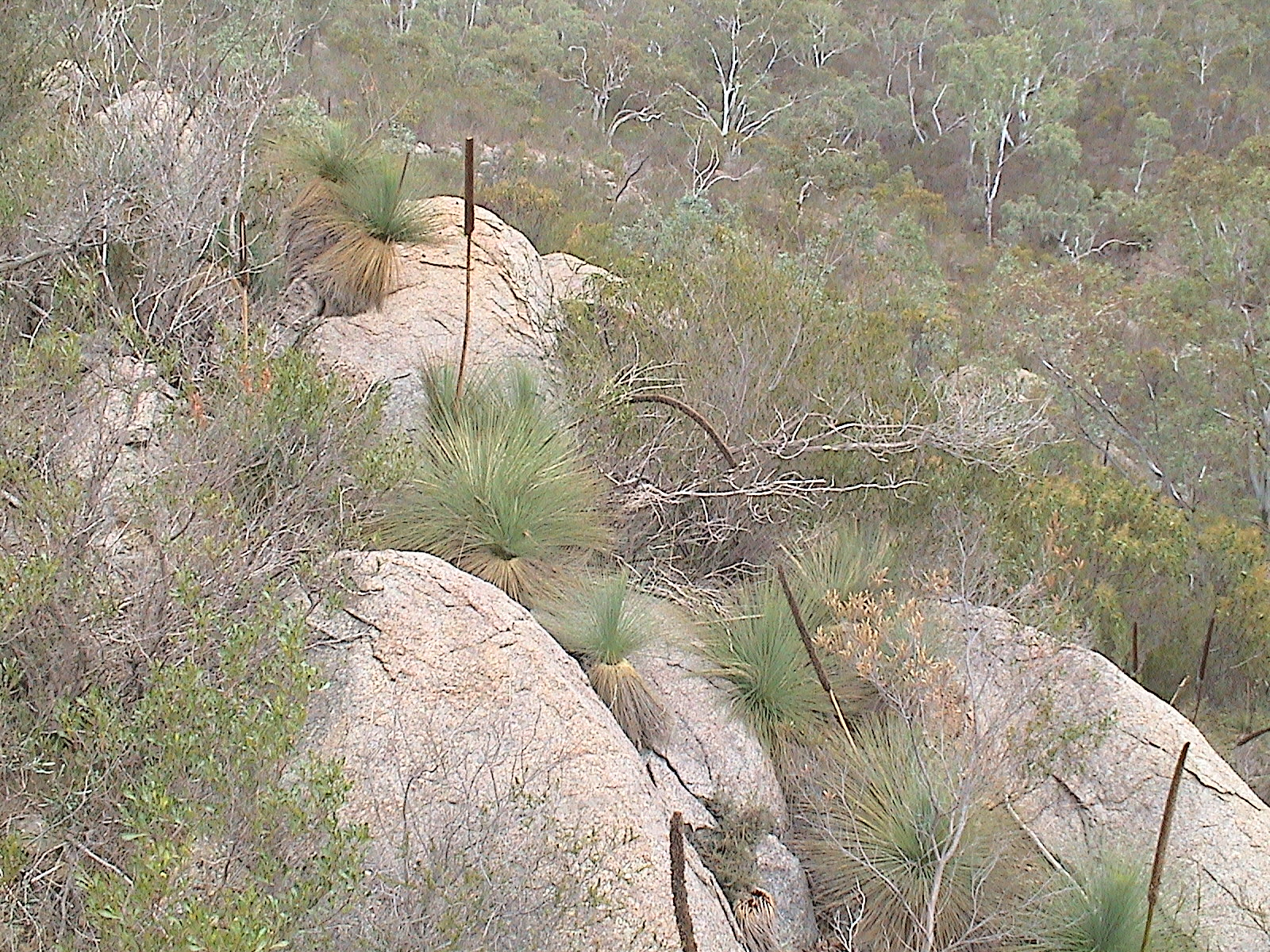
Yaccas growing in crevices in granite gneiss outcrop near Lizard Rock

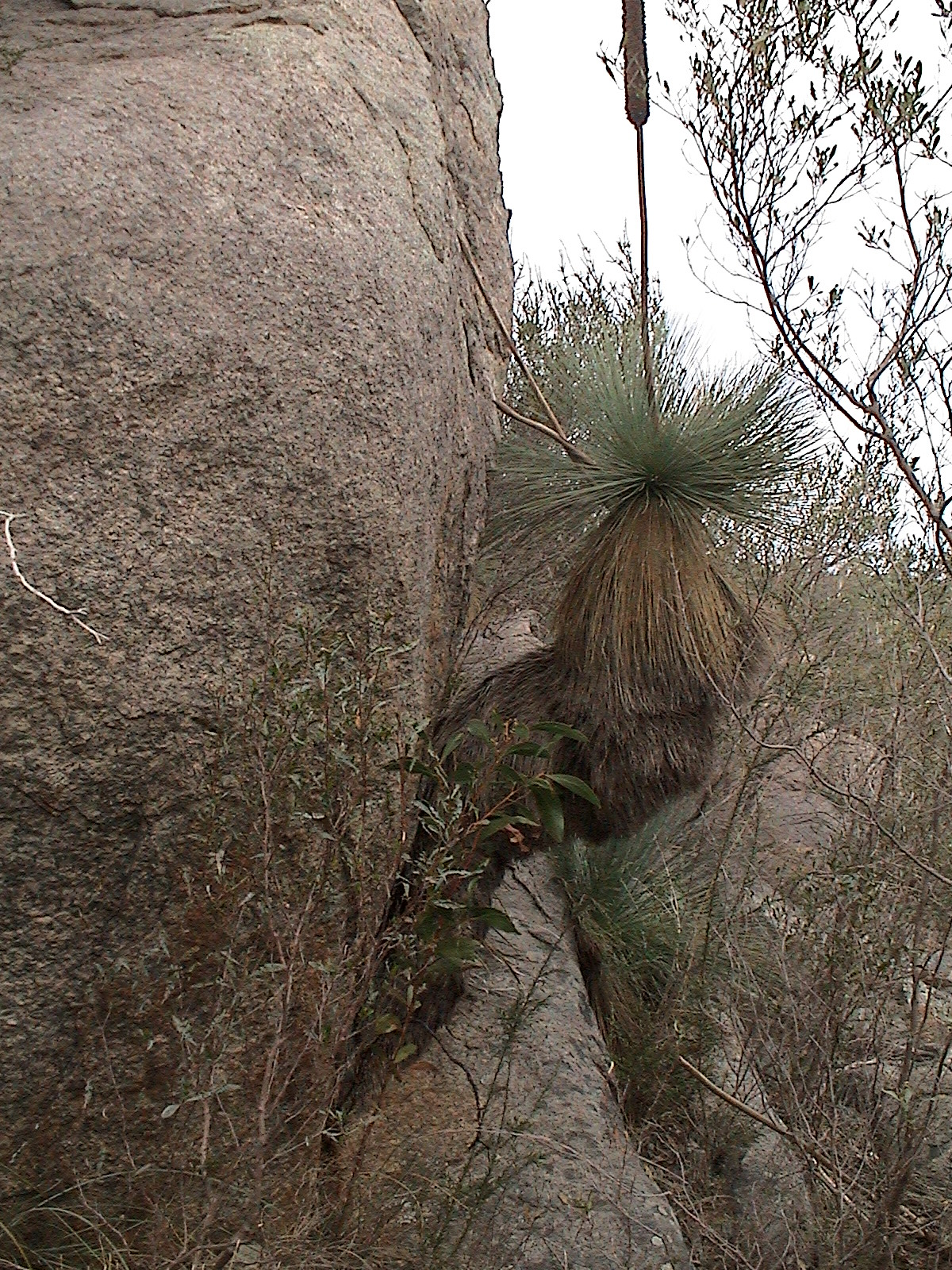
Yacca growing in crevice in granite gneiss outcrop near Lizard Rock

== See also ==
- List of protected areas in Adelaide
