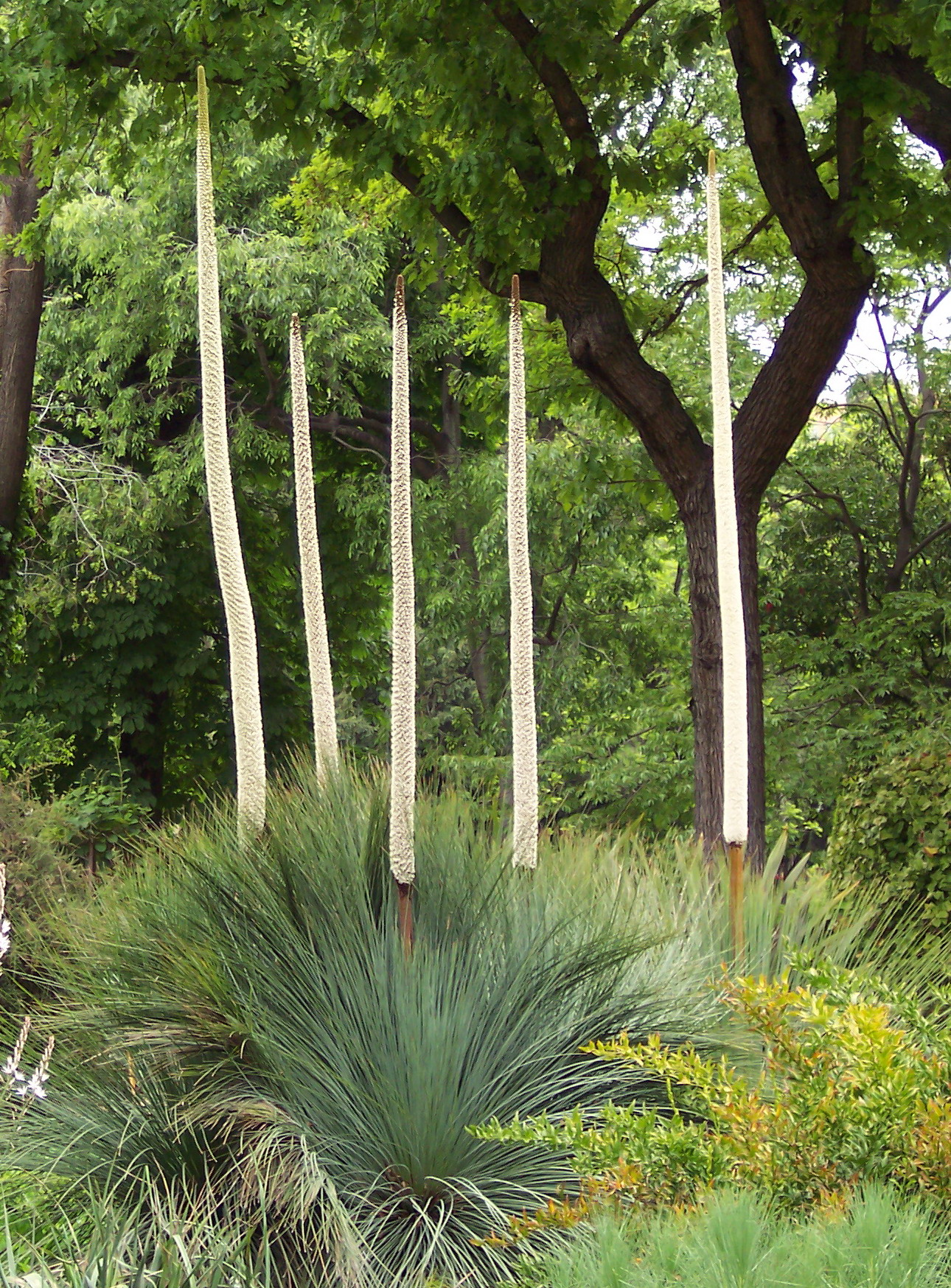

Scientific classification
- Kingdom: Plantae
- Clade: Embryophytes
- Clade: Tracheophytes
- Clade: Spermatophytes
- Clade: Angiosperms
- Clade: Monocots
- Order: Asparagales
- Family: Asphodelaceae
- Subfamily: Xanthorrhoeoideae
- Genus: Xanthorrhoea
- Species: X. quadrangulata

Binomial name
- Xanthorrhoea quadrangulata F.Muell.

= Xanthorrhoea quadrangulata =

Species of plant

Xanthorrhoea quadrangulata or the Mount Lofty grass tree is a plant in the genus Xanthorrhoea. It is the only species of Xanthorrhoea solely endemic to the state of South Australia.

== Description ==
A very slow growing plant with a thick rough trunk and blue-green foliage. In the wild, this trunk is often burnt black as a result of fire. The trunks are capable of reaching 2 m length or greater, and are frequently branched. Typical of the trunked species of Xanthorrhoea, this species is extremely slow growing, increasing in height by only 2–3 cm per year on average.

Blooms occur irregularly from winter to spring, producing flower spikes between 1 and 3 m in height. These spikes bear small, nectar rich flowers, and are a source of food for nectar eating birds and butterflies.

== Distribution ==
This plant occurs broadly occurs throughout the Mount Lofty Ranges, with its range extending into the Flinders Ranges. It frequently inhabits rocky sites and ridges, and is particularly tolerant of clay soil.

== Gallery ==
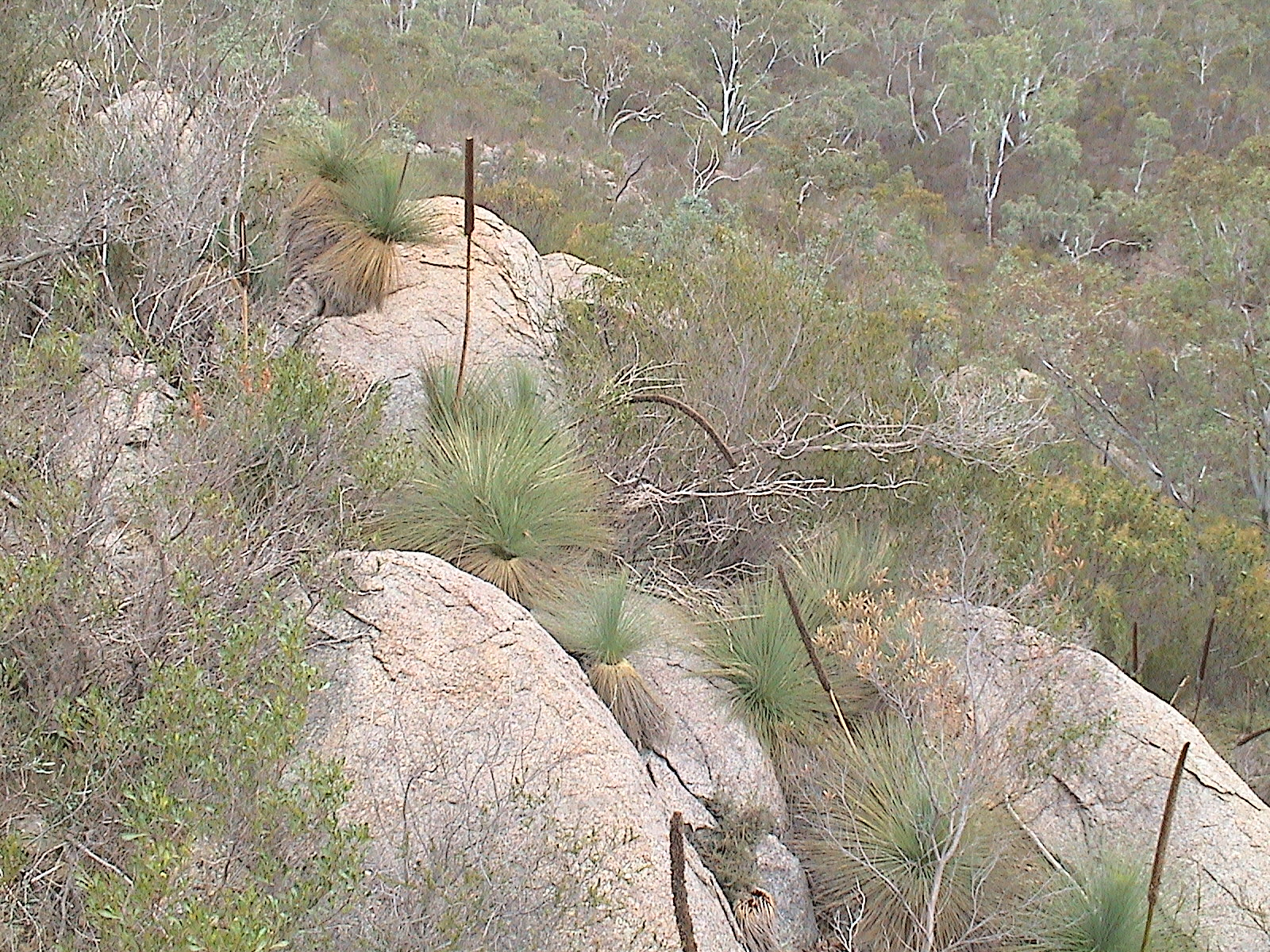
X. quadrangulata growing in crevices in granite gneiss outcrop at Parra Wirra, South Australia

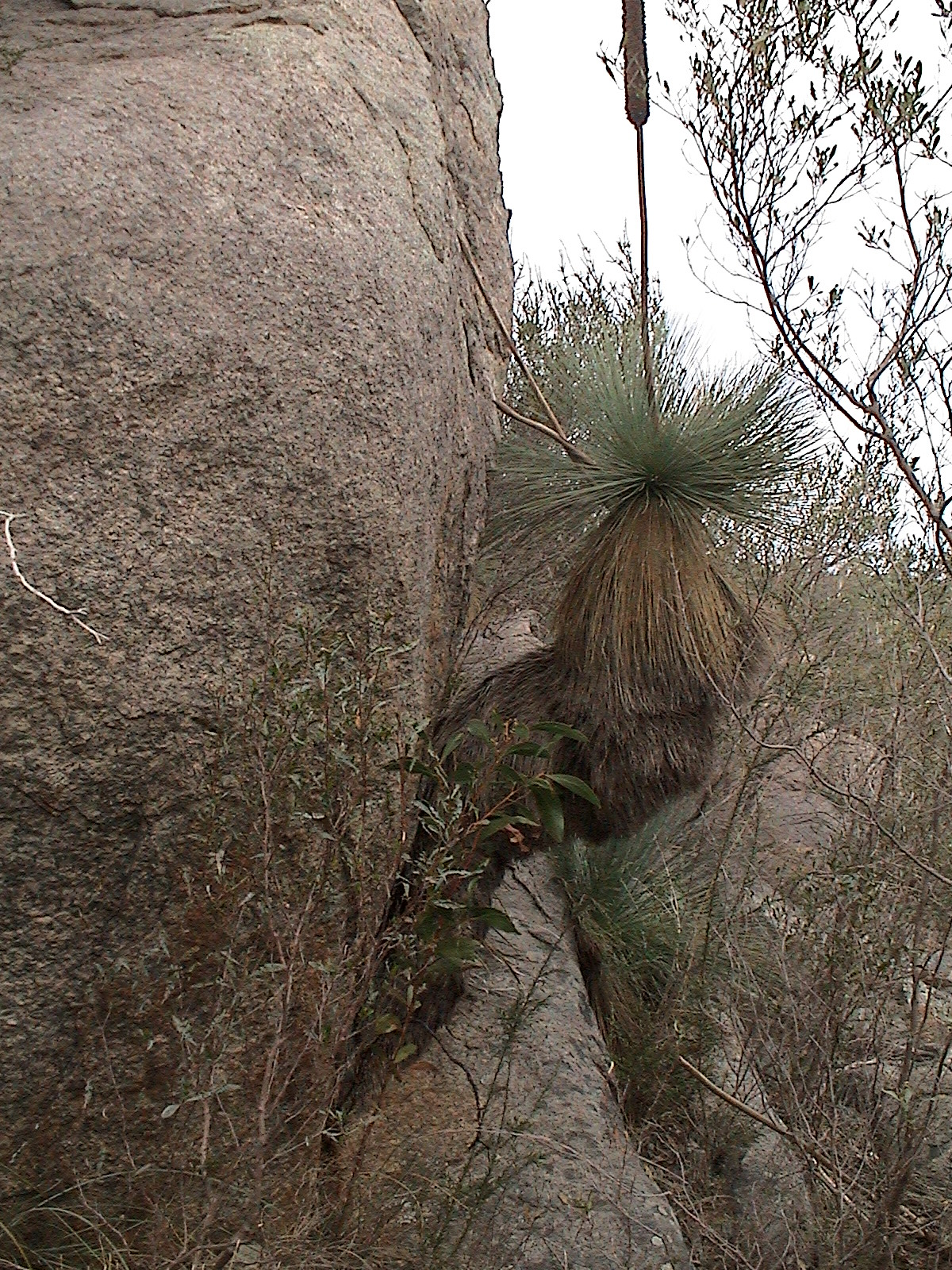
X. quadrangulata growing in crevice in granite gneiss outcrop at Parra Wirra, South Australia

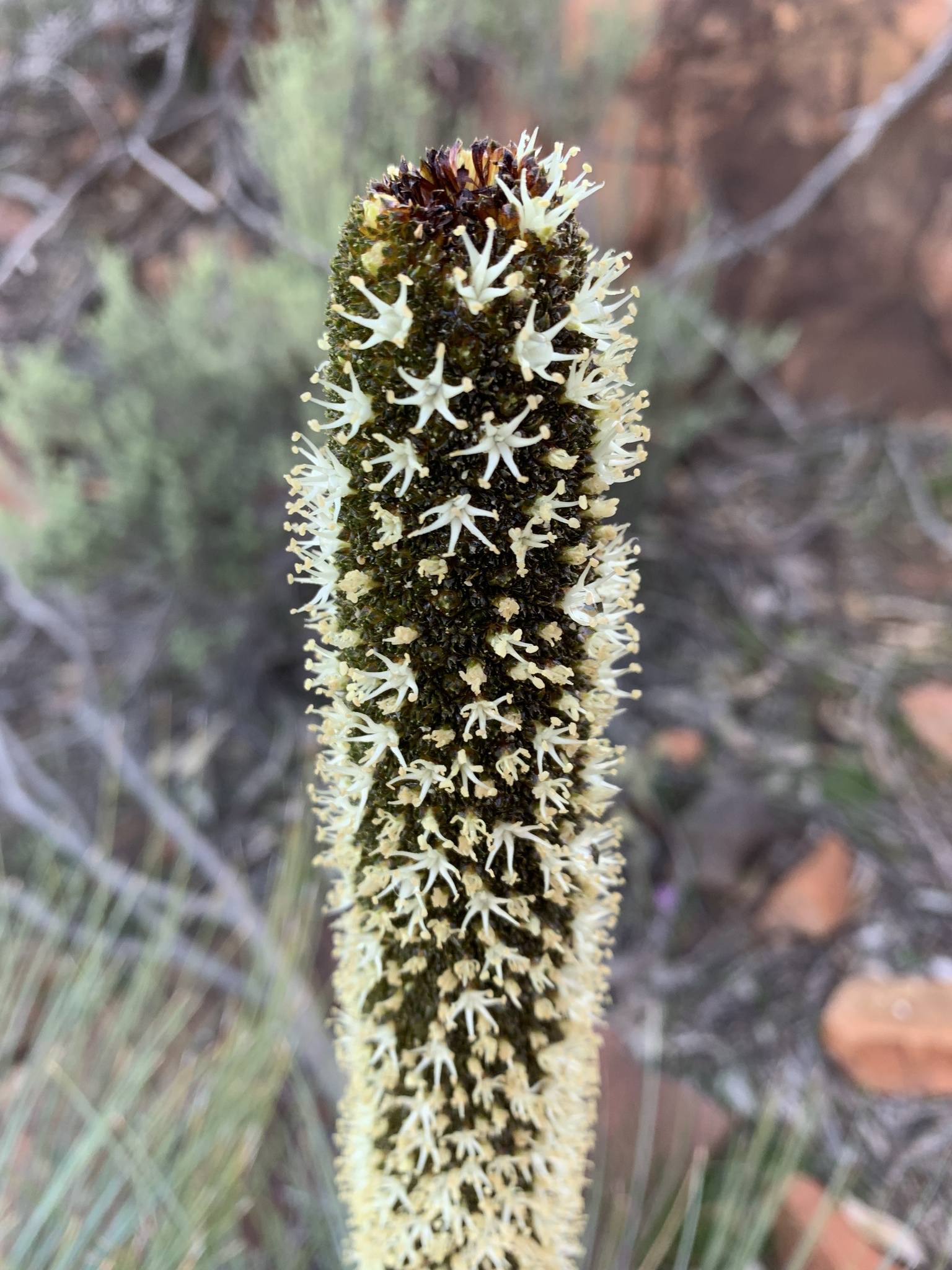
Macro photograph of flower spike

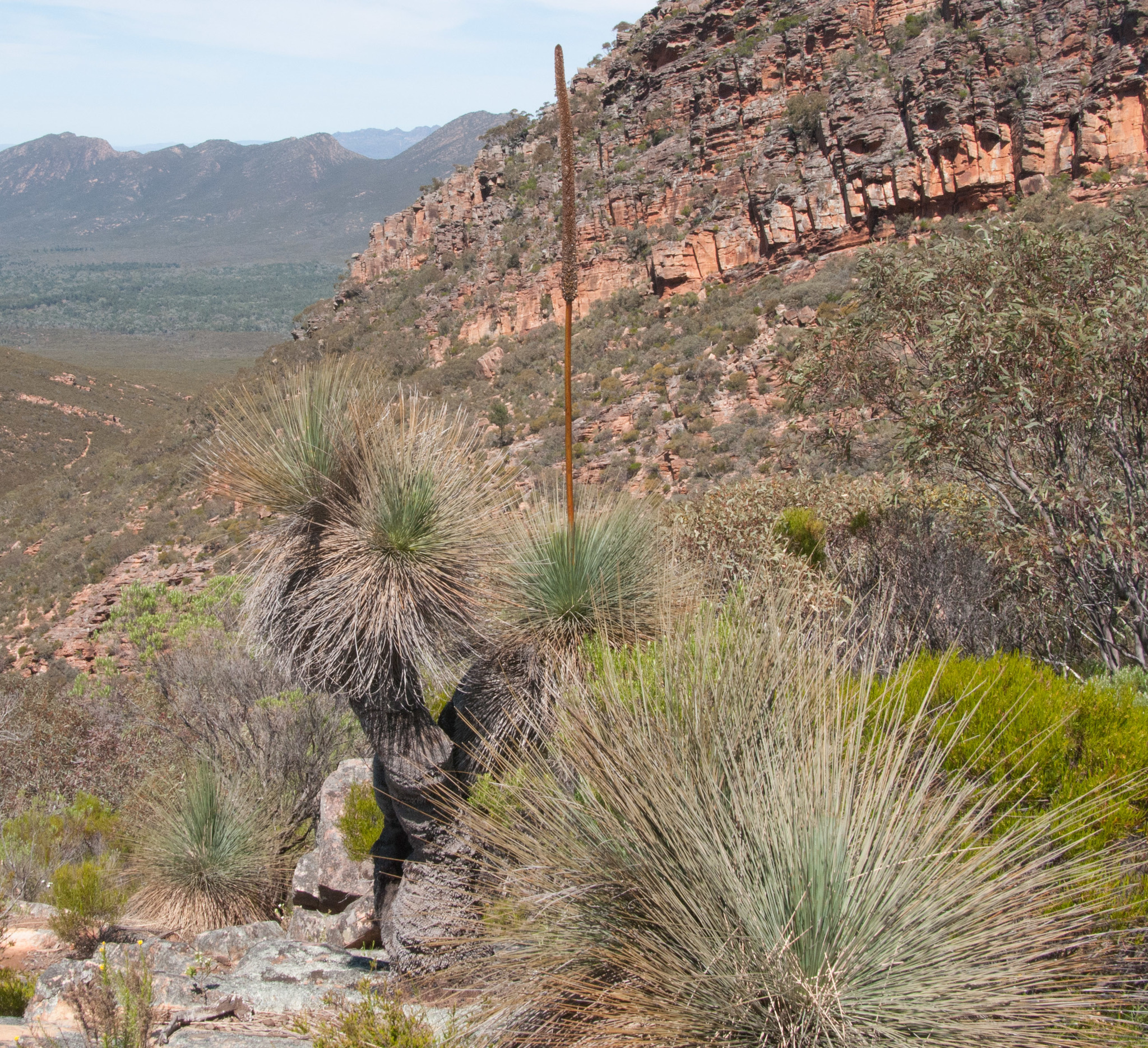
X. quadrangulata observed in the Flinders Ranges
