= Cockatoo Valley =

- Town
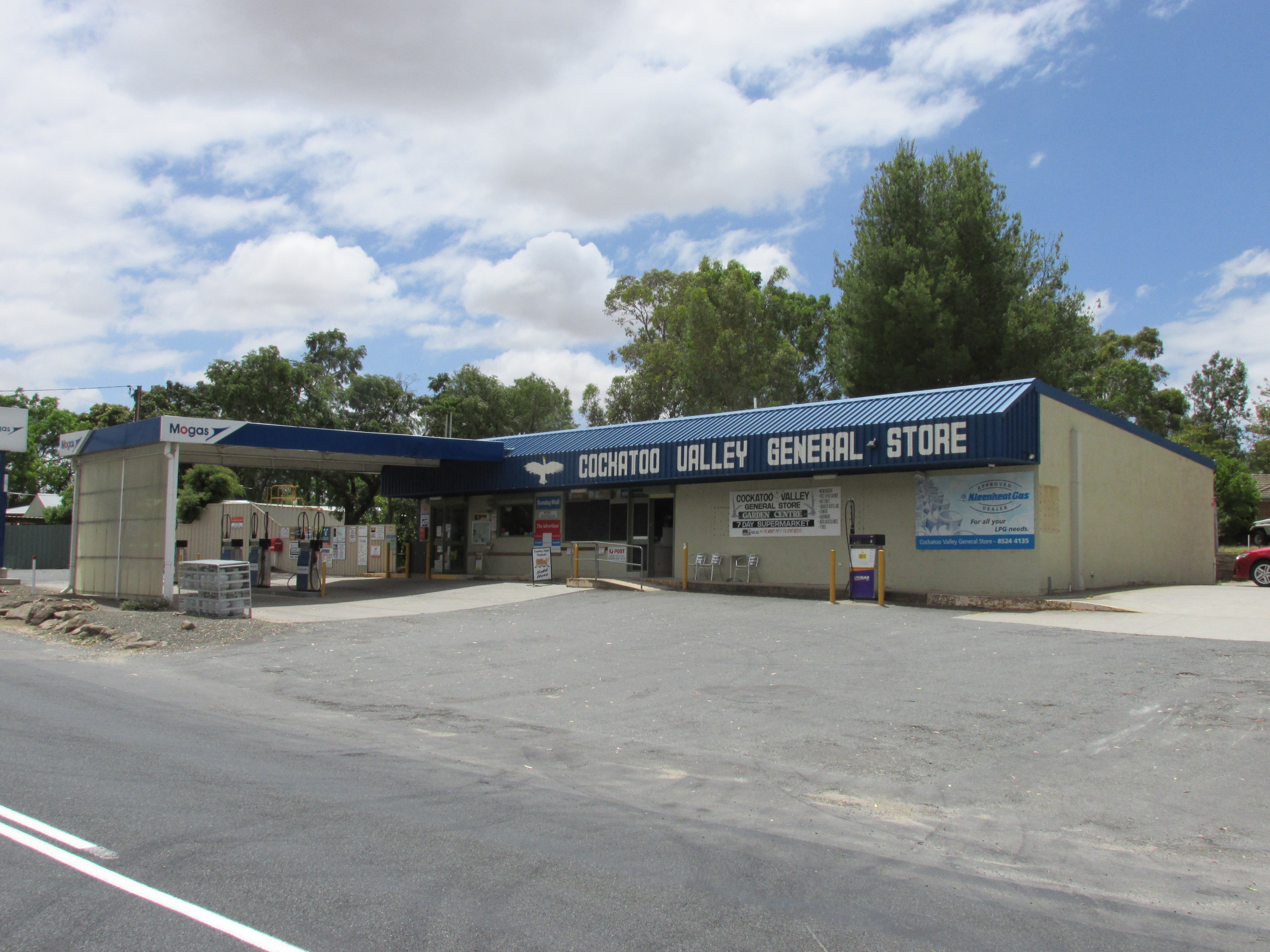
- Cockatoo Valley General Store

- Coordinates: 34°37′34″S 138°50′07″E
- Country: Australia
- State: South Australia
- Region: Barossa Light and Lower North
- LGA: Barossa Council
- Location: 41 km (25 mi) NE of Adelaide; 22 km (14 mi) SE of Nuriootpa; 10 km (6.2 mi) east of Gawler
- Established: 15 May 2003 (locality)

Government
  - State electorate: Schubert
  - Federal division: Barker

Population
  - Total: 688 (UCL 2021)
- Time zone: UTC+9:30 (ACST)
  - Summer (DST): UTC+10:30 (ACST)
- Postcode: 5351
- County: Adelaide
- Mean max temp: 22.6 °C (72.7 °F)
- Mean min temp: 10.0 °C (50.0 °F)
- Annual rainfall: 467.5 mm (18.41 in)
Localities around Cockatoo Valley
Kalbeeba	Sandy Creek	Sandy Creek
Kalbeeba; Barossa Goldfields	Cockatoo Valley	Sandy Creek; Lyndoch
Barossa Goldfields	Barossa Goldfields; Williamstown	Williamstown
- Locations; Adjoining localities

Cockatoo Valley is a locality in the Australian state of South Australia located about 41 kilometres (25 mi) north-east of the state capital of Adelaide and about 22 kilometres (14 mi) south-west of the municipal seat of Nuriootpa.

It was first seen and named by Europeans on 3 March 1838 when an exploration party of four young horsemen comprising John Hill, William Wood, Charles Willis, and John Oakden camped there on the first overland expedition from Adelaide to reach the River Murray at present Morgan. Oakden reported that the valley was 'swarming with cockatoos, seven of which were shot' to roast for supper. They encamped there at 'a rivulet' they had discovered, later named Yettie Creek.

Cockatoo Valley is located within the federal division of Barker, the state electoral district of Schubert and the local government area of the Barossa Council.
