= Lyndoch, South Australia =

Lyndoch
- Town
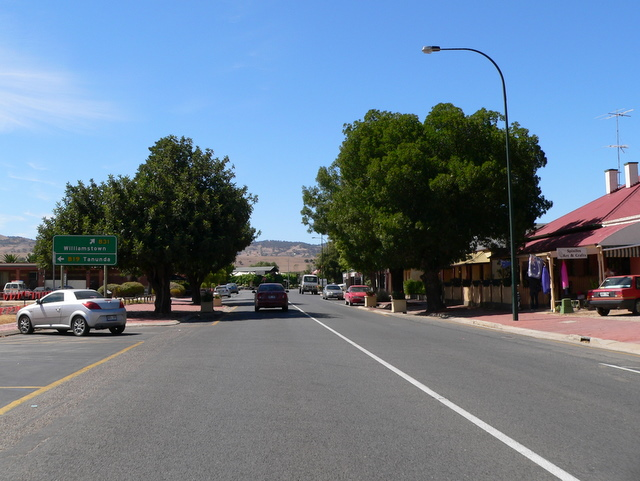
- Main street of Lyndoch

- Coordinates: 34°36′14″S 138°53′12″E
- Country: Australia
- State: South Australia
- Region: Barossa Light and Lower North
- LGA: Barossa Council
- Location: 58 km (36 mi) North East of Adelaide via
- Established: 1837

Government
  - State electorate: Schubert
  - Federal division: Barker
- Elevation: 175 m (574 ft)

Population
  - Total: 2,000 (2016 census)
- Postcode: 5351
- County: Adelaide
Localities around Lyndoch
Rosedale	Gomersal	Rowland Flat
Sandy Creek	Lyndoch	Altona
Cockatoo Valley	Williamstown	Williamstown

Lyndoch is a town in Barossa Valley, located on the Barossa Valley Highway between Gawler and Tanunda, 58 km northeast of Adelaide. The town has an elevation of 175m and an average rainfall of 560.5mm. It is one of the oldest towns in South Australia.

The town is now primarily a service centre for the surrounding grape and wine industry and a dormitory town with a significant number of local residents commuting to the city of Adelaide each day for employment.

Lyndoch is in the Barossa Council. It is in the state electoral district of Schubert and the federal Division of Barker.

== History ==
Lyndoch was named by Colonel William Light in December 1837 after his esteemed friend Thomas Graham, Lord Lynedoch under whom he served at the Battle of Barrosa outside Cádiz during the Peninsula War, in 1811. As in the naming of the Barossa Valley itself, it may have been an unfortunate misspelling that gave the town its name, but reflects the proper pronunciation of "Lynedoch". The town was settled in 1839 and the village laid out later.

Lyndoch was declared a sister town to Georgetown, Texas as both Texas and South Australia celebrated their sesqui-centenaries in 1986.

== Railway ==
Lyndoch was served by a station on the Barossa Valley railway line from its opening in 1911 to the cessation of passenger services in 1968 and the full closure of the line in 2014. The station was also used for transport of good and timber. Before the railway was built, there was considerable discussion about the route of the line near Lyndoch, and the location of the Lyndoch railway station.

== Cycling ==
Lyndoch is a stop on the Barossa Trail, a shared cycling and walking path that goes from the outskirts of Gawler through Lyndoch, Rowland Flat, Tanunda, Nuriootpa to Angaston). The Tour Down Under frequently finishes here.

== See also ==
- Sandy Creek Conservation Park
- Chateau Yaldara
