= Williamstown, South Australia =

Village in South Australia

Williamstown
- Town
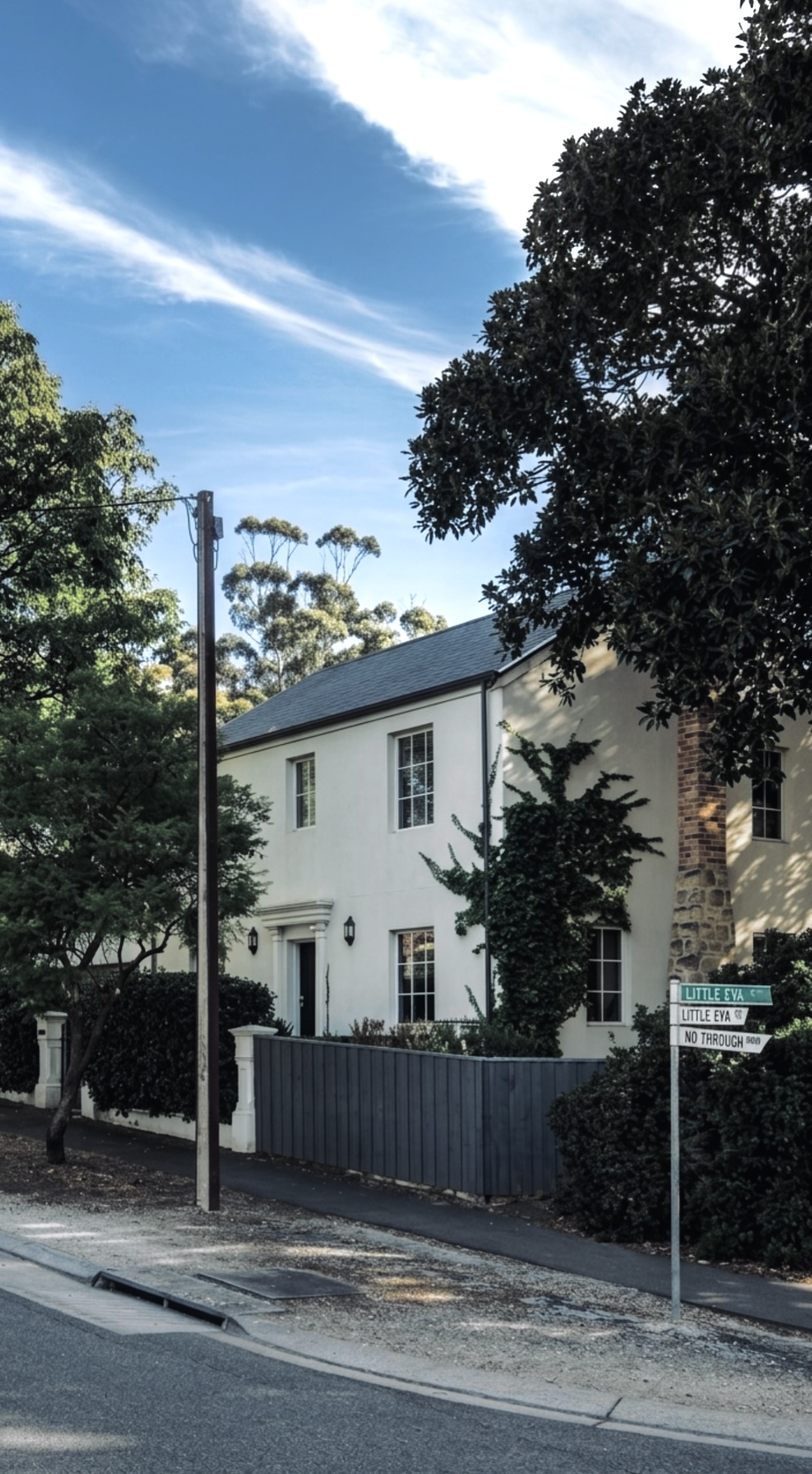
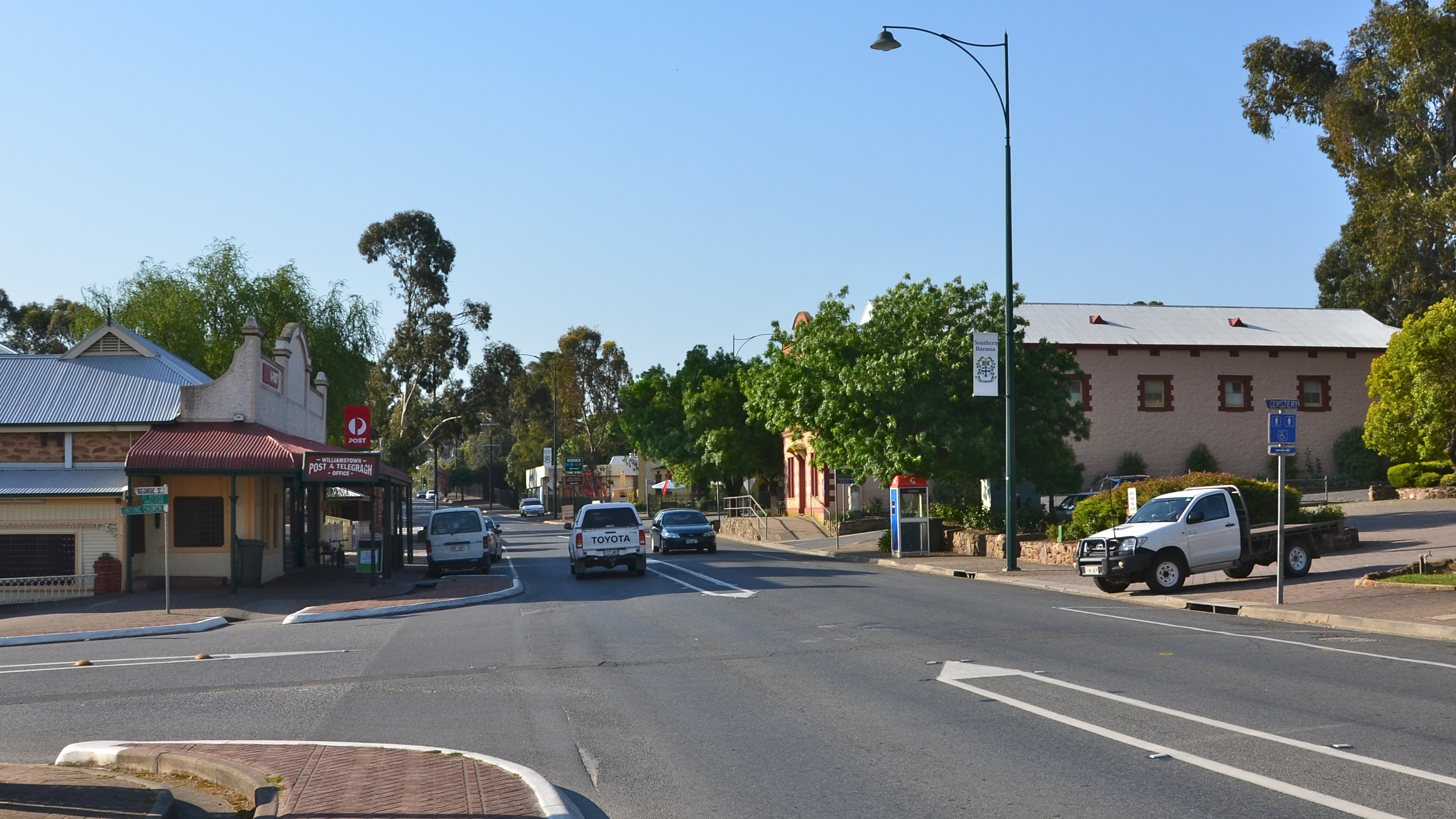
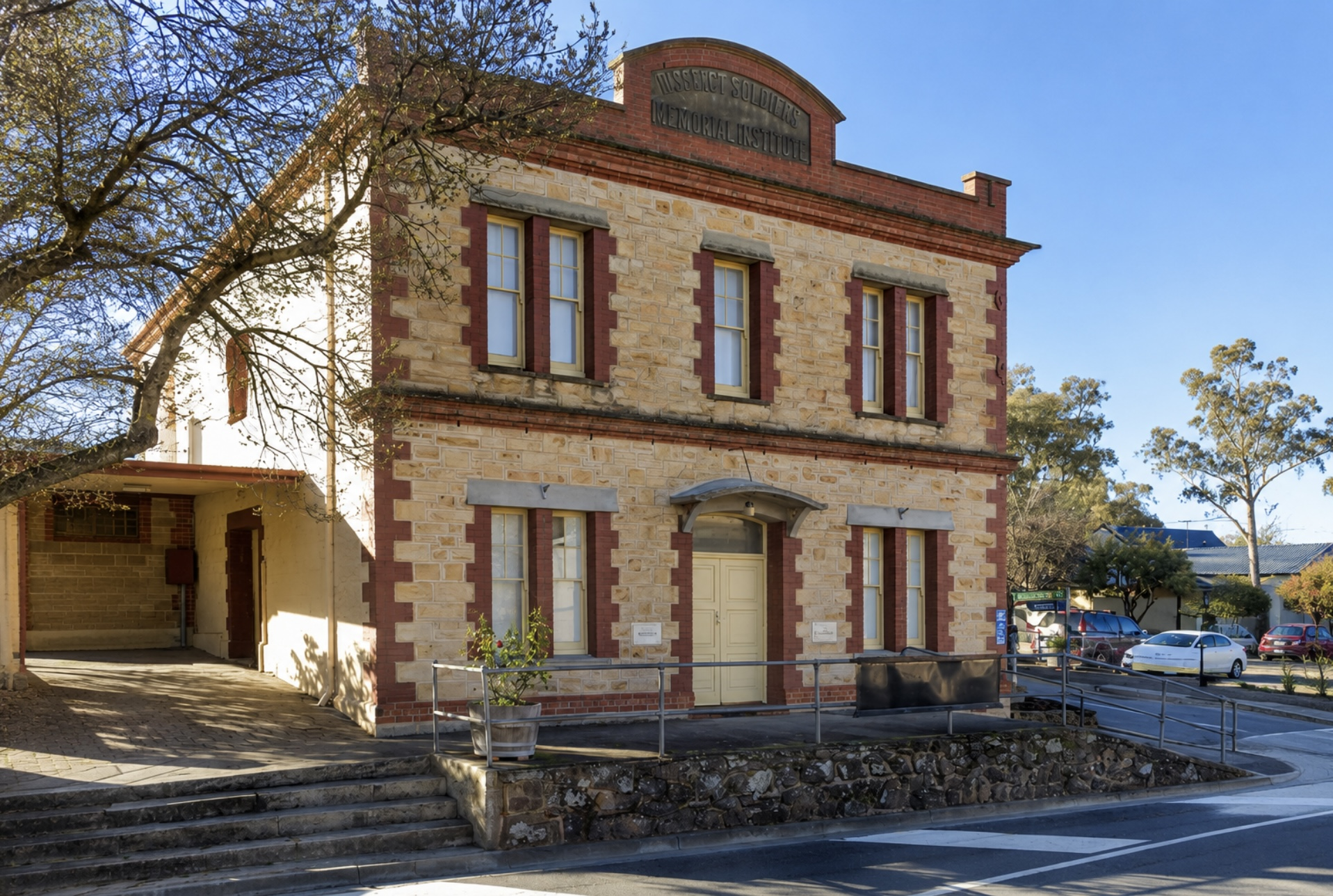
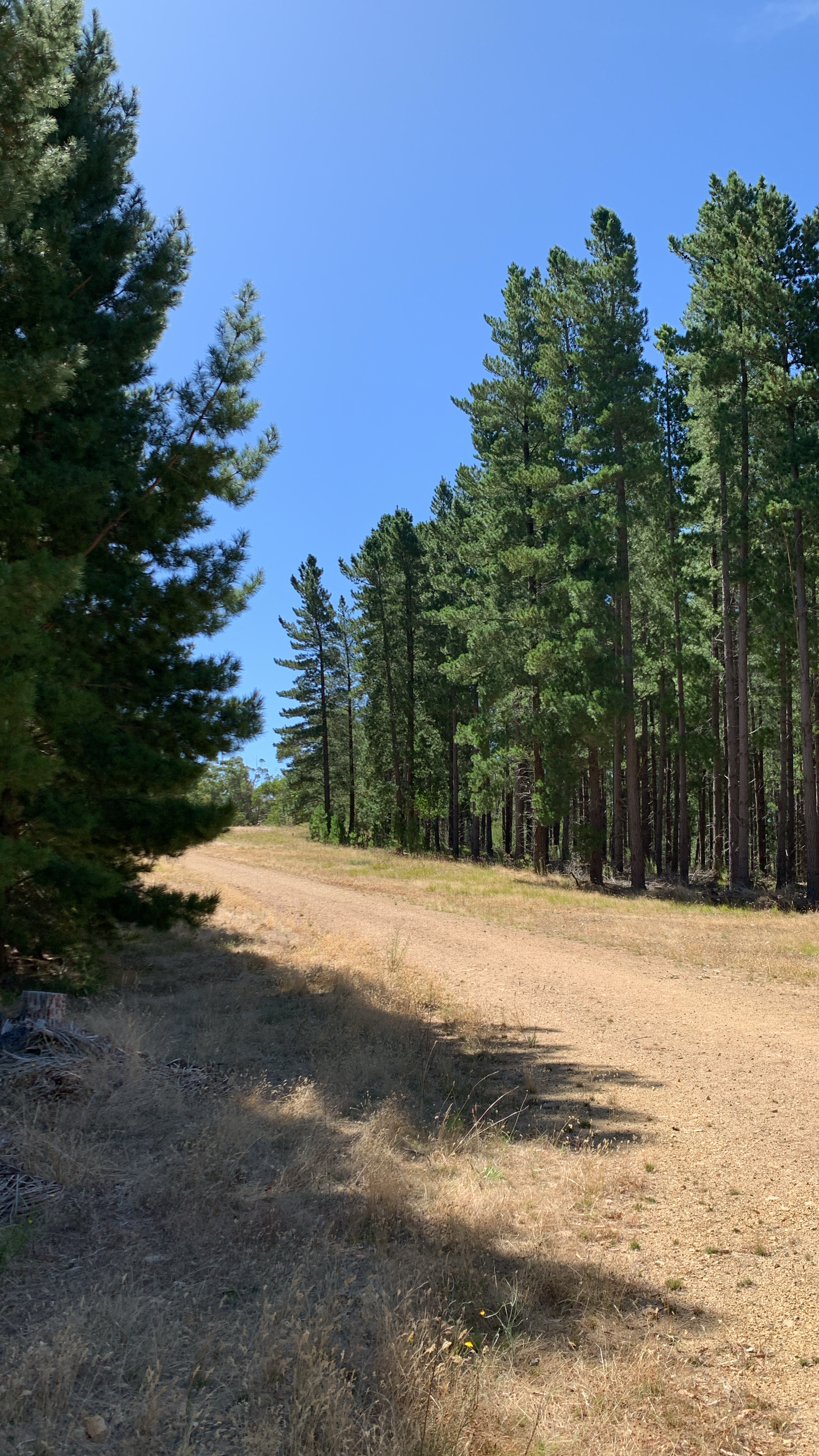
- Clockwise from top left: Town centre, pine forest, and town hall.

- Coordinates: 34°40′20″S 138°53′18″E
- Country: Australia
- State: South Australia
- Region: Adelaide Hills
- LGA: Barossa Council
- Location: 39 km (24 mi) NE of Adelaide; 15 km (9.3 mi) SE of Gawler; 25 km (16 mi) SW of Nuriootpa
- Established: 1857 (private sub-division); 15 March 2003 (locality)

Government
  - State electorate: Schubert
  - Federal division: Barker
- Elevation: 310 m (1,020 ft)

Population
  - Total: 2,755 (2016 census)
- Postcode: 5351
- Mean max temp: 20.1 °C (68.2 °F)
- Mean min temp: 9.7 °C (49.5 °F)
- Annual rainfall: 682.7 mm (26.88 in)
Localities around Williamstown
Cockatoo Valley	Cockatoo Valley; Lyndoch; Altona	Altona; Pewsey Vale
Cockatoo Valley; Barossa Goldfields; Yattalunga	Williamstown	Pewsey Vale; Mount Crawford
Yattalunga	Yattalunga; Kersbrook; Mount Crawford	Mount Crawford; Forreston; Gumeracha
- Locations; Adjoining localities

Williamstown is a small South Australian village in the Adelaide Hills. It is 51 km north east of Adelaide and 16 km south-east of Gawler. Williamstown was originally known as Victoria Creek. The township was laid out in 1858 by Lewis Johnston, or Johnstone, on land he purchased in 1857, and named for his son.

Williamstown has an elevation of 310 m and an average rainfall of 680 mm. It has a summer average temperature of 31 °C with temperatures often reaching the mid 40s, and a winter average temperature of 15 °C, with nights dropping below freezing, which makes the region excellent for the cultivation of fruits, especially grapes in the lower riverine alluvial deposits.

== History ==
Williamstown was essentially a farming area with sheep and cattle in the early days with fruit orchards, mixed farms and vines. Williamstown also sustained a forestry and lumber industry from the earliest days with three sawmills. Today only a small family-owned timber sawmill and Cooperage remains with the closure of the two larger mills by 1990. Many local residents work in the wine / viticulture industry throughout the Barossa Valley.

In the Australian Federation Year (1901) a local hay barn found along Yettie Road (formerly Yatta Creek Road) inhabited only by ducks and pigeons was discovered to be the remains of the alleged oldest slab and stone homestead in South Australia (circa 1841) which has been carefully restored to its former glory.

Springfield Homestead, along Springton Road, was originally built by John Warren, who emigrated from Scotland in 1838, established Adelaide's first brewery, and then sold that to finance his share of the Special Survey for pastoral development in the Mount Crawford area (of which Springfield was part). The property was later taken over by youngest son, John Warren (politician), and then by that John Warren's son George. After George Warren died unmarried in 1957, the property was sold to local land baron pastoralist, BJ MacLachlan. MacLachlan was a contemporary of the more famous Australian pastoral entrepreneurs and cattle barons such as Kidman. His great-great-grandchildren still live at the historic Homestead. They operate one of the largest stations in Australia at Commonwealth Hill.

The nearby South Para Reservoir was built in the early 1950s to help supply Adelaide with its demanding domestic water supplies, supplementing the earlier Warren Reservoir and Barossa Reservoir. The curved dam retaining wall at the Barossa Reservoir, known as the Whispering Wall because of its acoustic properties, is a tourist attraction. The Barossa Goldfields, scene of a gold rush in 1868 (as well as some smaller rushes later), lie to the west of the Barossa Reservoir. A handful of 'boutique' tourist gold mining operation were started around 1985 near Sandy Creek and the Barossa Goldfields.

Williamstown is considered to be a 'Southern gateway' town into the Barossa Valley. It has one of the oldest public house hotels in South Australia dating from 1841 and several original farm homesteads built by the first homesteaders from rough-cut slab timber. One excellent example of this can be found along Warren Road towards Kersbrook.

In the late summer of 1956 Williamstown was struck by a 3.6 magnitude earthquake that lasted for almost eight minutes and caused structural damaged to many of the stone structures and brick buildings in the area. Domestic wells and sweetwater springs in the area dried up for several weeks thereafter due to the many landslips and seismic movements below the surrounding Gawler Ranges.

In 1970 Williamstown hosted one of the last performances of the Barnum & Baily, Ringling Brothers Circus in the original Big Top at the Oval where their performing elephants were enjoyed along with 'the world's smallest horse' at just over five hands high.

== Description ==
In the springtime, Williamstown is seen at its best, with a carpet of green grass and wildflowers along the many creeks and thick woodlands covering the low-rolling hills around the town, dotted with large dairy pastures and vineyards. To the East and South, Williamstown is skirted with Forestry Commission plantations open for public access, in certain areas, large swathes of National Park and the Hale Conservation Park for walkers and hikers.

The Williamstown Oval is set in the welcome summer-shade of a large wooded hill in a small valley fed by crystal clear cold-water springs that feed the Victoria Creek stream that passes through the town centre. At the Oval there is a picnic area and small caravan park, serving visitors and transient workers, overlooking the local Football Clubhouse and 1950s-era public swimming pool.

Williamstown is in the Barossa Council local government area, the state electoral district of Schubert and the federal Division of Barker.

== See also ==
- Para Wirra Conservation Park
