= Barossa Valley =

Barossa Valley Barossa Tal (Barossa German)
- Region
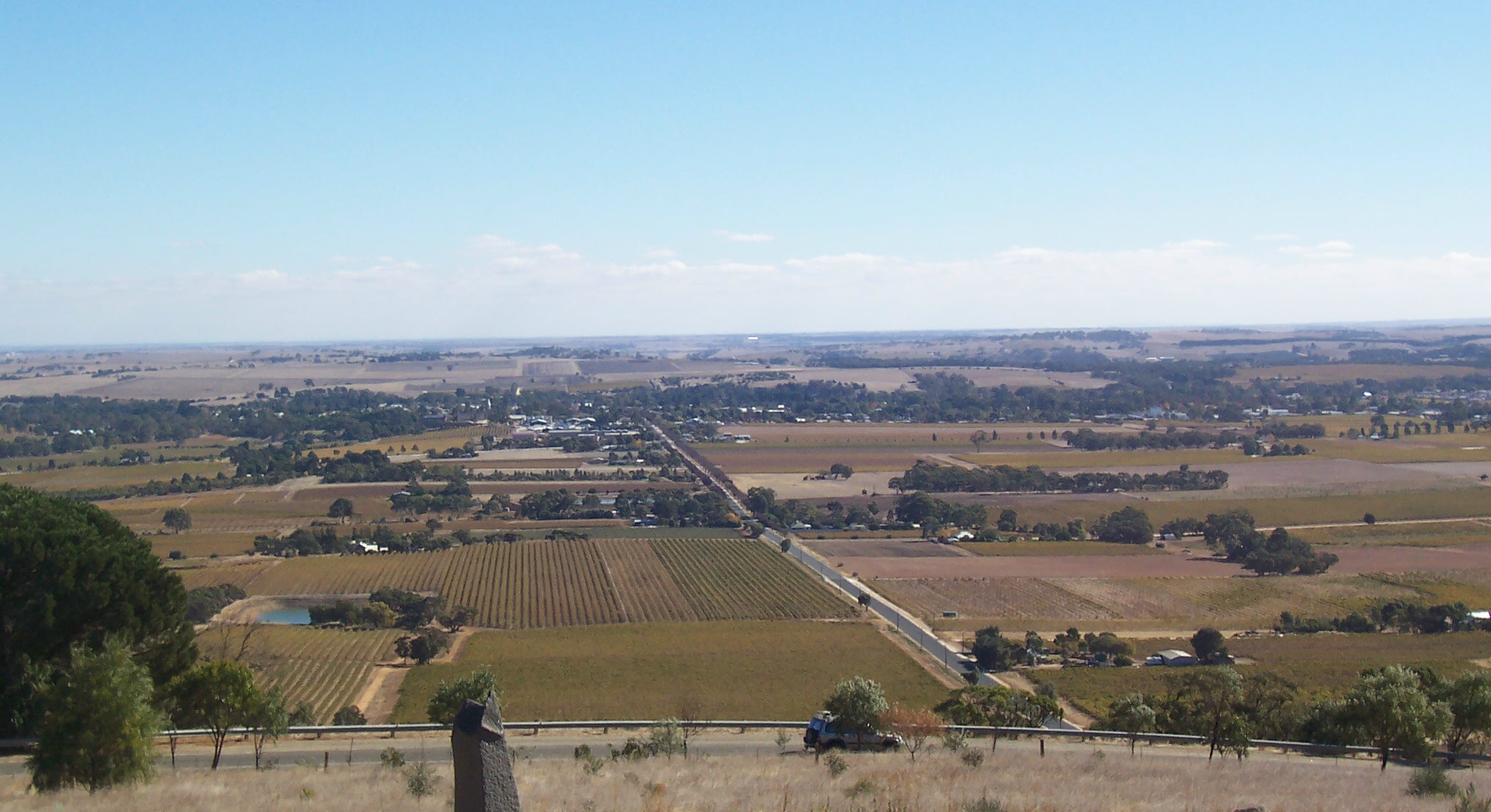
- Autumn colour surrounding Tanunda

- Coordinates: 34°32′S 138°57′E
- Country: Australia
- State: South Australia
- LGAs: Barossa Council; Light Regional Council
- Location: 60 km (37 mi) NE of Adelaide city centre

Area
  - Total: 912 km^{2} (352 sq mi)

Population
  - Total: 25,066 (2021)
  - Density: 20/km^{2} (52/sq mi) (approx.)
- Time zone: UTC+9.5 (ACST)
  - Summer (DST): UTC+10.5 (ACDT)

The Barossa Valley (Barossa German: Barossa Tal) is a valley in South Australia located 60 kilometres (37 mi) northeast of Adelaide city centre. The valley is formed by the North Para River. It is notable as a major wine-producing region and tourist destination.

The Barossa Valley Way is the main road through the valley, connecting the main towns on the valley floor of Nuriootpa, Tanunda, Rowland Flat and Lyndoch. The Barossa Trail walking and cycling path is 40 kilometres (25 mi) long, and passes the main towns, starting from near Gawler on the Adelaide Plains, to Angaston to the east of the valley.

== History ==
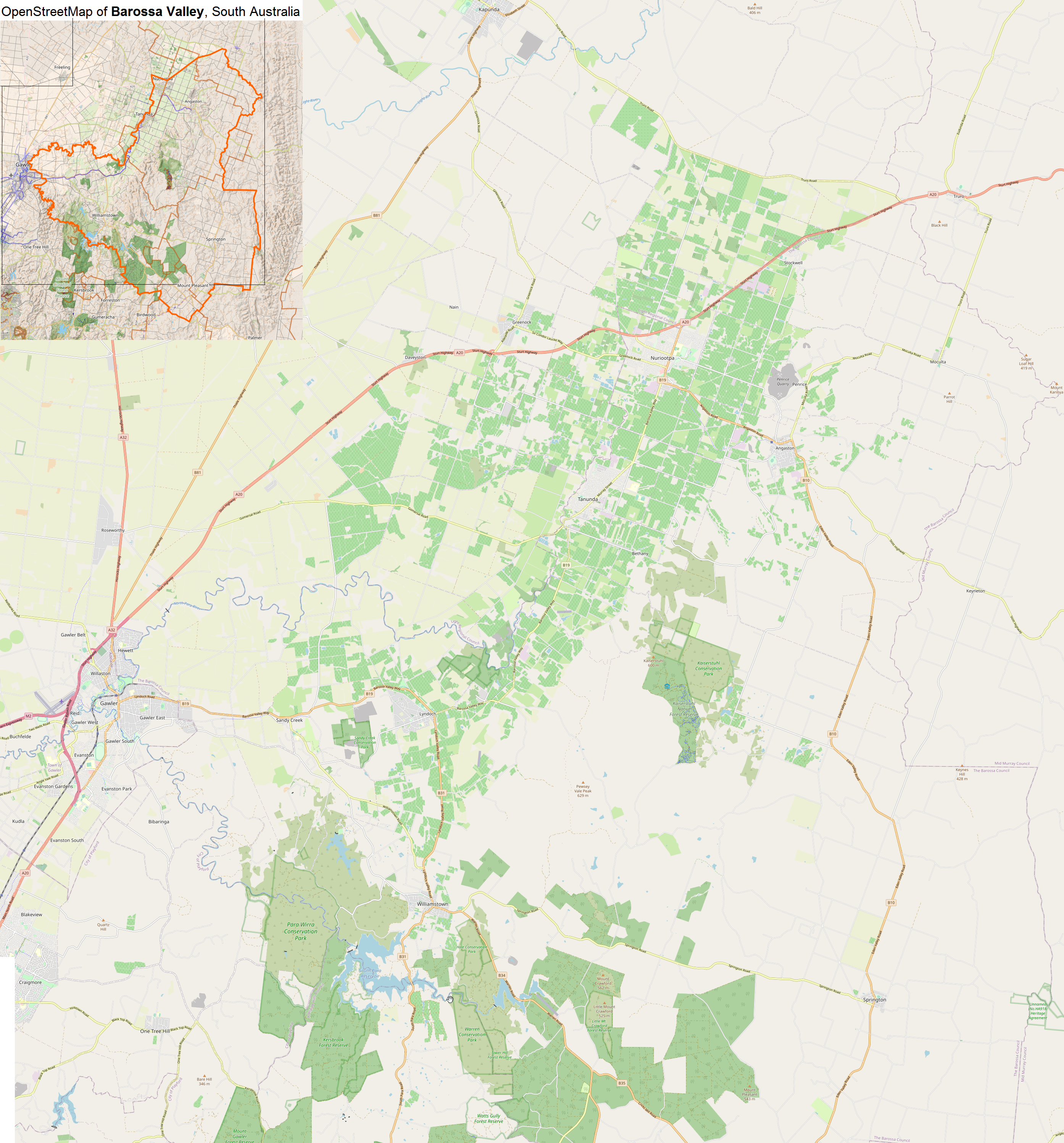
A detailed map of the Barossa Valley

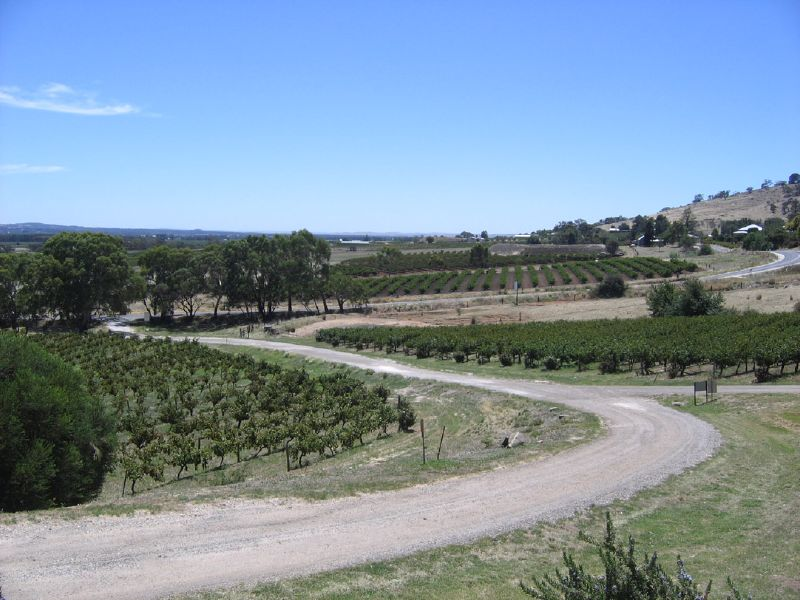
The Bethany vineyard, first planted in 1852. Bethany was the first settlement in the Barossa region.

The traditional owners of the land including the Barossa Valley are the Peramangk people, who comprise a number of family groups. Evidence of their thousands of years of occupation can be seen all around the area, in the form of artefacts, scar trees and shelter paintings.

The Barossa Valley derives its name from the Barossa Range, which was named by Colonel William Light in 1837. Light chose the name in memory of the British victory over the French in the Battle of Barrosa, in which he fought in 1811. The name "Barossa" was registered in error, due to a clerical error in transcribing the name "Barrosa". The area is approximately 13 by 14 kilometres (8.1 by 8.7 mi).

The three major towns of the Barossa have distinctive characteristics. Tanunda is generally recognised as the most German of the three, with traditions dating back to the 1840s when the first German settlers arrived in the area. Since many of the German settlers came from Prussian Silesia, they called the Barossa Neu-Schlesien, or "New Silesia".

The German influence survives to this day (see Barossa German). Angaston, in contrast, is considered the English town as it was settled predominantly by Cornish miners and others from Britain. The third, and largest town, Nuriootpa, was influenced by both German and British settlers, and today is the commercial hub of the Barossa and it is where most of the larger stores are located.

In February 2011, South Australian Premier, Mike Rann, announced that special legislation would be introduced to protect the unique heritage of the Barossa Valley and of McLaren Vale. He said: "Barossa and McLaren Vale food and wine are key icons of South Australia. We must never allow the Barossa or McLaren Vale to become suburbs of Adelaide." The Character Preservation (Barossa Valley) Act 2012 was subsequently passed by the South Australian Parliament.

== People ==
In 2021, 25,066 people lived in the Barossa Valley. Most inhabitants live in Tanunda, Nuriootpa, Angaston, Williamstown and Lyndoch, each having over 1,000 people. The remaining population lives in the countryside, or a few smaller towns such as Moculta and Springton. All of these towns are part of the Barossa local government. The townships of Greenock, population 1087, Seppeltsfield, population 138, and Marananga, population 104, are located on the western ridge of the valley in Light Regional Council. Many facilities not available in these towns are usually supplemented in nearby Gawler. In recent years, increased development in the area has seen opposition from the local communities.

=== Religion ===
The region has a strong German Lutheran history, and many residents identify themselves as Lutherans. Some towns have more than one Lutheran church. Tanunda, for example, has Langmeil, St. Paul's, Tabor and St. Johns. Nuriootpa has St. Petri and Holy Trinity. Angaston has Zion and Salem (Penrice).

Each major town has a Lutheran primary school. Tanunda has Tanunda Lutheran School, Nuriootpa has Redeemer, and Angaston has Good Shepherd. St. Jakobi, the Lutheran primary school at Lyndoch, hosts the Barossa Airshow annually as its fundraiser.

=== Population ===
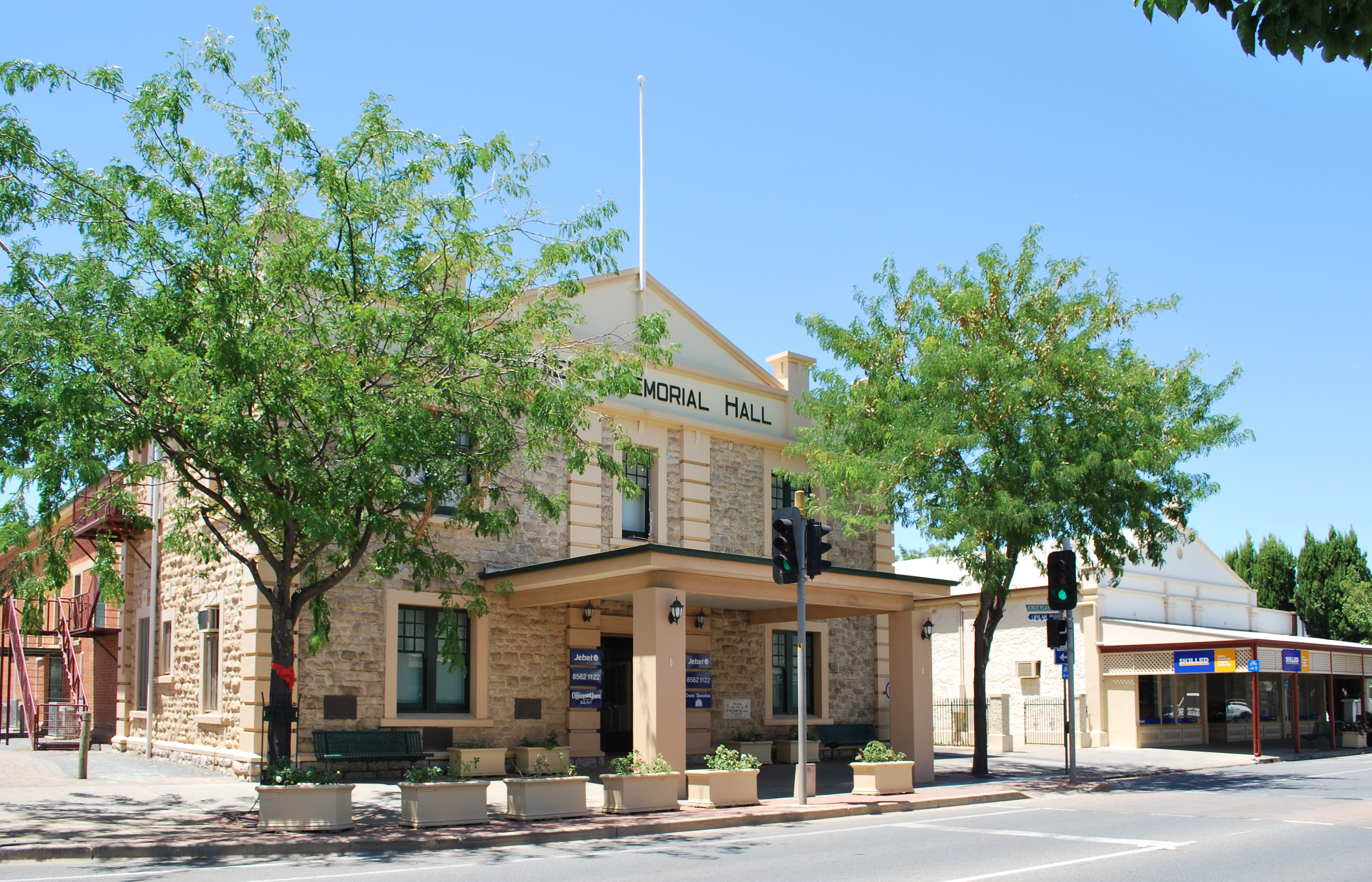
Nuriootpa Memorial Hall

Major Town Populations:

Rank	Urban Centre	2016 Census Population
1	Nuriootpa	5,691
2	Tanunda	4,324
3	Angaston	2,044
4	Williamstown	2,163
5	Lyndoch	1,799
6	Greenock	1,087
7	Mount Pleasant	586
8	Springton	378

As a rural region, there is also significant population outside of the town centres (not shown here).

== Wine industry ==
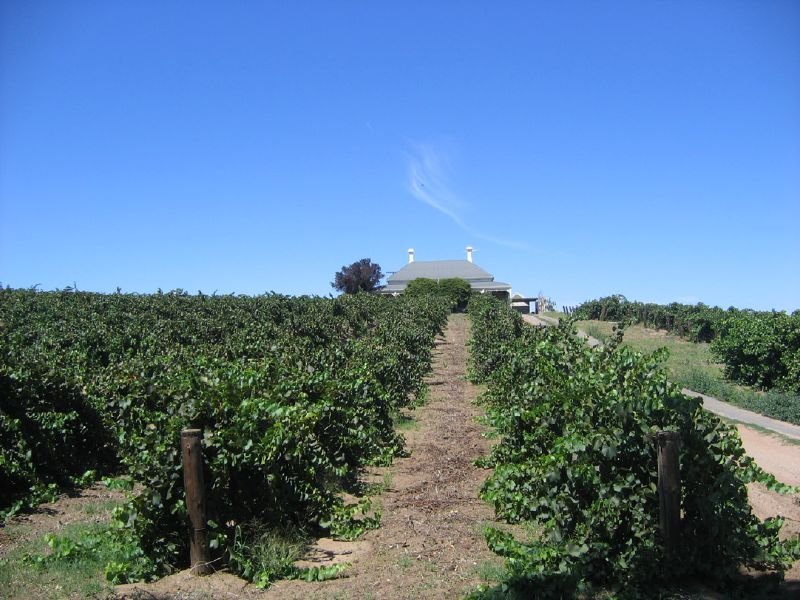
Wine grape vines in the Barossa Valley

The wine industry plays a major role in the Barossa, being the main source of employment for many residents. The many hectares of vineyards are the most distinctive feature of the area, especially when viewed from the Mengler Hill lookout, positioned on the Barossa Range which forms much of the eastern side of the valley. The success of the wine industry has historically been celebrated every two years with a week-long Barossa Valley Vintage Festival. The festival draws visitors from all over the world, and has entertainment for all tastes including a huge street parade, concerts and gourmet dining.

The Barossa Valley is primarily known for its red wine, in particular Shiraz. Normally, large proportions of Barossa Shiraz are used in Penfolds Grange, Australia's most famous wine. Other main grape varieties grown in the region include: Riesling; Semillon; Grenache and Cabernet Sauvignon. Fortified wines have been traditionally produced in the region as well.

Marananga is home to the only sub-regional wine competition in Australia, hosted by the Gnadenfrei Lutheran church community since 2004 and focussed solely on benchmarking wines produced on the Western Ridge of the valley.

The Barossa Valley is a rich source of some of the oldest Shiraz vines in the world. Shiraz vines planted as early as 1847 by Johann Frederick August Fiedler on Lot 1, Hundred of Moorooroo (the township of Tanunda) are still in commercial production today by Turkey Flat Vineyards.

== Food production ==
Although it is overshadowed by the wine industry, significant food production occurs in the Barossa Valley, including:

- Bakeries that produce traditional German breads and pastries
- Butchers who produce meat and smallgoods in the German style
- Artisan cheesemakers
- Maggie Beer is a renowned cook, food author, restaurateur and food manufacturer. Her Farm Shop sells a range of condiments under her name. She is co-presenter of ABC Television's programme The Cook and the Chef.

The Barossa Valley holds a weekly Farmers' Market, supplying local produce which is sold directly by the producer.

== Festivals ==
=== Barossa Vintage Festival ===
The week-long Barossa Vintage Festival is held biennially, in odd-numbered years. The festival runs for around a week in autumn, and traditionally marks and celebrates the completion of the year's vintage season, at the end of March and beginning of April. A variety of wine-themed events are held during the festival, including wine tastings and competitions, musical events, food events with local produce, balls and parades.

The Barossa Vintage Festival was first held in 1947, to celebrate the end of the grape harvest, and the end of hostilities in World War II, and has run continually since. It is Australia's oldest and longest-running wine festival.

=== Barossa Gourmet Weekend ===
The Barossa Gourmet Weekend is a three-day food, wine, and art celebration held in the third weekend of August every year. Local wineries and venues host individual events throughout the Barossa, offering food, wine, music, arts and hospitality.

== In the arts ==
- Orr, Stephen (2004). Hill of Grace. Wakefield Press. ISBN 1-86254-648-7. Novel set among the German settlers in the Barossa during World War II.

== See also ==
- German Australians
- Australian wine
- South Australian food and drink
- South Australian wine
