= Electoral district of Schubert =

South Australian state electoral district

Schubert South Australia—House of Assembly
- Interactive map of electoral district boundaries from the 2022 state election (Note: The electorate will have no change in boundaries at the 2026 state election.)
- State: South Australia
- Created: 1997
- MP: Ashton Hurn
- Party: Liberal
- Namesake: Max Schubert
- Electors: 29,369 (2026)
- Area: 2,181.3 km^{2} (842.2 sq mi)
- Demographic: Rural
- Coordinates: 34°40′48″S 139°11′32″E
Electorates around Schubert:
	Ngadjuri
Light; Elizabeth	Schubert	Chaffey
King; Newland; Morialta	Heysen; Kavel	Hammond

Schubert is a single-member electoral district for the South Australian House of Assembly covering the Barossa Valley and northern part of the Adelaide Hills. It is named after Max Schubert, the winemaker of Penfolds Grange Hermitage.

== History ==
The Barossa Valley area was first represented by the seat of Barossa. The seat of Custance was abolished and recreated as Schubert in the 1994 redistribution and first contested at the 1997 election.

== Extent and description ==
Schubert incorporates all of the Barossa Council, and is made up of portions of the Adelaide Hills Council, City of Playford, City of Tea Tree Gully, Light Regional Council, and Mid Murray Council. Areas covered include Eden Valley, Kersbrook, Nuriootpa, Lyndoch, Springton, Tanunda, and Williamstown.

== 2020 Boundary redistribution ==
Following the 2020 redistribution Schubert underwent major boundary changes. The western end of the electorate including Freeling, Roseworthy and Wasleys were transferred to Frome. But the major changes were south where Schubert gained parts of the Adelaide Hills that were previously in Newland and Morialta. Schubert now stretches as far south as Paracombe, Cudlee Creek and Mount Torrens.

The key changes were the following:

Schubert gained the localities of Bibaringa, Birdwood, Chain of Ponds, Cromer, Cudlee Creek, Ebenezer, Forreston, Gumeracha, Houghton, Humbug Scrub, Inglewood, Kenton Valley, Kersbrook, Koonunga, Lower Hermitage, Kenton Valley, Millbrook, Moppa, Mount Torrens, Paracombe, Sampson Flat, St Johns, St Kitts, Truro, Uleybury, Upper Hermitage, and Yattalunga.

It lost a portion of Adelaide Plains Council (which includes the localities of Fischer and Lewiston and a portion of the locality of Reeves Plains) and a portion of Light Regional Council (which includes the localities of Freeling, Kangaroo Flat and Roseworthy). It also lost the localities of Gawler Belt, Gawler River and Ward Belt, and the remainder of the localities of Hamley Bridge and Reeves Plains.

== Members for Schubert ==
Member	Party	Term
Ivan Venning	Liberal	1997–2014
Stephan Knoll	Liberal	2014–2022
Ashton Hurn	Liberal	2022–present

== Election results ==
2026 South Australian state election: Schubert
Party	Candidate	Votes	%	±%
Liberal	Ashton Hurn	12,515	47.0	−4.4
One Nation	Bruce Preece	6,079	22.8	+16.0
Labor	James Rothe	5,352	20.1	−2.6
Greens	Beverley Morris	1,855	7.0	−3.2
Animal Justice	Alice Shore	420	1.6	+1.6
Australian Family	Matt Williams	297	1.1	+1.1
Fair Go	David Duncan	108	0.4	+0.4
Total formal votes		26,626	97.1	+0.9
Informal votes		790	2.9	−0.9
Turnout		27,416	93.4	+0.7
Two-candidate-preferred result
Liberal	Ashton Hurn	17,946	67.4	+5.5
Labor	James Rothe	8,681	32.6	−5.5
Liberal hold		Swing	+5.5	
