= Barossa Council =

Coordinates: 34°30′S 139°03′E

Barossa District Council
- Local government area
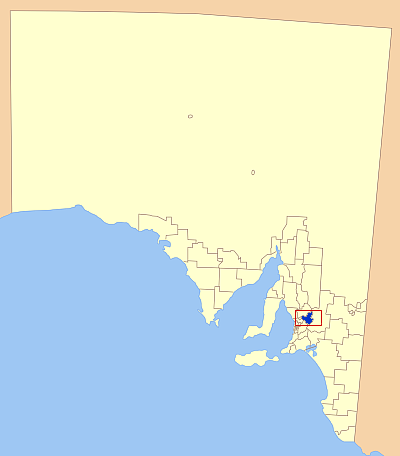
- The location of the Barossa Council in blue

- Interactive map of Barossa District Council
- Country: Australia
- State: South Australia
- Region: Barossa Light and Lower North
- Established: 1996
- Council seat: Nuriootpa

Government
  - Mayor: Michael "Bim" Lange
  - State electorate: Schubert
  - Federal divisions: Barker; Spence

Area
  - Total: 912 km^{2} (352 sq mi)

Population
  - Total: 25,066 (LGA 2021)
  - Density: 27.48/km^{2} (71.2/sq mi)
- Website: Barossa District Council
LGAs around Barossa District Council
Town of Gawler	Light Regional Council	Mid Murray Council
City of Playford	Barossa District Council	Mid Murray Council
Adelaide Hills Council	Adelaide Hills Council	Mid Murray Council

Barossa Council is a local government area in the Barossa Valley in South Australia. The council area covers 912 square kilometres, and had a population of over 23,000 in the 2016 Census and 25,066 in the 2021 census.

== History ==
Barossa Council was created in July 1996, following the amalgamation of the District Council of Angaston, the District Council of Barossa and the District Council of Tanunda. The council gained a portion of the former District Council of Mount Pleasant in July 1997.

== Description ==
Townships in the council area include

- Angaston
- Eden Valley
- Lyndoch
- Moculta
- Mount Pleasant
- Nuriootpa
- Penrice
- Springton
- Stockwell
- Tanunda
- Williamstown

== Mayors ==
- Brian Hurn - 1996-2014
- Bob Sloane - 2014-2018
- Michael "Bim" Lange - 2018 - present

== See also ==
- List of parks and gardens in rural South Australia
- Hoffnungsthal, South Australia
