= Schoenthal, South Australia =

Schoenthal
- Town
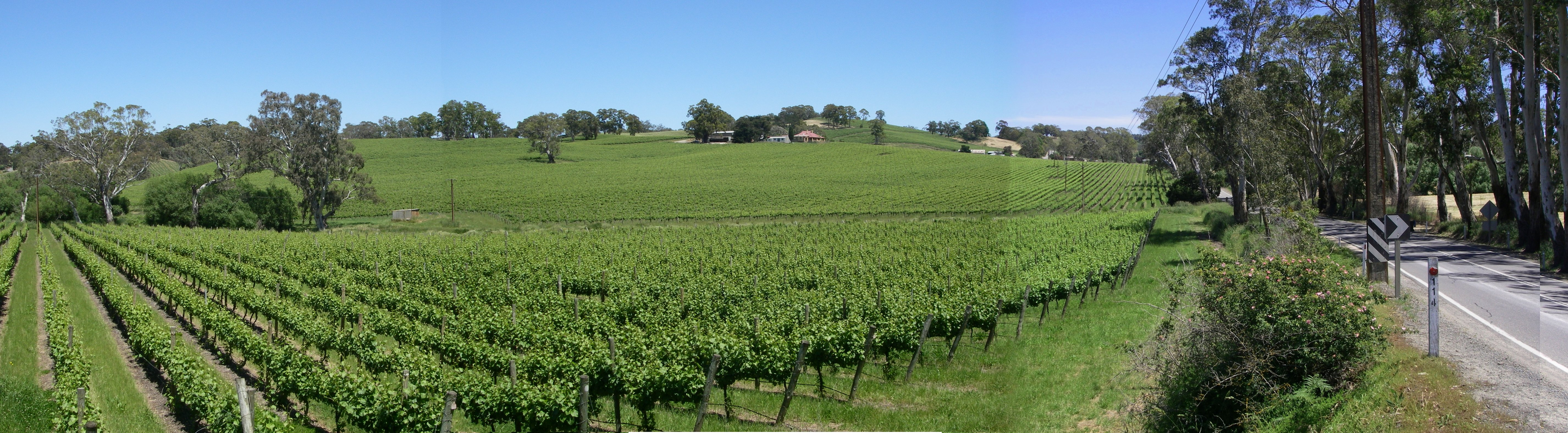

- Interactive map of Schoenthal
- Coordinates: 34°54′20.2″S 138°53′58.1″E
- Country: Australia
- State: South Australia
- LGA: Adelaide Hills Council
- Location: 43 km (27 mi) East of Adelaide via
- Established: 1850s

Government
  - State electorate: Morialta
  - Federal division: Mayo
- Postcode: 5241
Localities around Schoenthal
Lobethal	Kenton Valley; Gumeracha	Mount Torrens
Lobethal	Schoenthal	Springhead
North Woodside	Charleston	Charleston; Harrogate

Schoenthal (German: [ˈʃøːnˌtaːl]) is a locality/suburb of Lobethal situated in the Adelaide Hills Council and Adelaide Hills region of South Australia, 43 kilometres east-north-east of the state capital, Adelaide (34°46′S 139°3′E).

== History ==
Schoenthal was founded around the 1850s, by mostly German settlers from the Prussian provinces of Brandenburg, Poznań, and Silesia. Foundation initially consisted of large stone barns built by the Pfeiffer family, these barns were used for both storage of and threshing of grain. Further buildings such as a two storey house along with stables were constructed, also by the Pfeiffer family, specifically Mr. Johann Freidrich Pfeiffer, according to his great, great, grandson, Mr. C.A. Pfeiffer.

== Etymology ==
Schoenthal, in German (Schönthal) meaning 'beautiful valley' was named for its characteristics that include fertile soil, green carpeted landscape, and cool, moderate climate.

During World War One, Schoenthal, like many German-origin place names within South Australia was renamed to 'Boongala' due to anti-German sentiment within government. In 1986 it was reverted to the original name.

== Facilities ==
Today, Schoenthal is mainly made up of farming, vinyards, and large residential allotments, with a very low population, services are located in nearby larger towns, such as Lobethal, Charleston, and Woodside. Two primary schools, country fire, and a supermarket are located very close by in Lobethal.

== Transport ==
The locality is serviced by Adelaide Metro buses that run from the Adelaide CBD to Lobethal and along Onkaparinga Valley Road, a main road nearby.

== See also ==
- Lobethal
- Charleston
