= Hoffnungstal =

Hoffnungstal or Hoffnungsthal may refer to:

- Hoffnungsthal, South Australia, an abandoned German pioneer settlement
- Hoffnungstal, a former name of Tsebrykove, Ukraine
- Hoffnungstal, a district of Much, North Rhine-Westphalia, Germany
- Hoffnungstal, a village in the Omsk Oblast, in southwestern Siberia, Russia
- Hoffnungstal, an abandoned village near Mykolaivka, Bolhrad Raion, Odesa Oblast, Ukraine
- Hoffnungsthal, a suburb of Rösrath, North Rhine-Westphalia, Germany
- Hoffnungsthal, part of the municipality Goosefeld in Schleswig-Holstein
