= Nomenclature Act 1935 =

The Nomenclature Act 1935 (SA) restored the former German names of the towns of Hahndorf and Lobethal as well as the Adelaide suburb of Klemzig, the names of which had been changed in 1918.

Hahndorf had been known as Ambleside, Lobethal had been known as Tweedvale, and Klemzig had been known as Gaza. In 1935, Heinrich Krawinkel (died 1962), chairman of the German-Australian Centenary Committee and previously consul for Germany, wrote to the Premier of South Australia proposing that the original German names be restored. Initially Krawinkel's request was denied but after receiving support from the South Australian branch of the Royal Geographical Society of Australasia, legislation was drafted to effect the changes. The Nomenclature Act 1935 was assented to on 12 December 1935.

Prior to World War I, there were many Australian place names with German names throughout Australia, but because of the ongoing war against Germany and subsequent anti-German sentiment, many place names of German origin were changed. This was done through either petition or acts of Parliament. The South Australian Nomenclature Act 1935 attempted to reverse and revert the name changes that had occurred during WWI and post war years.

During World War II the residents of Klemzig petitioned the Government of South Australia on a number of occasions to have the name Gaza re-instated but these requests were denied.
