= Lobethal =

- Town
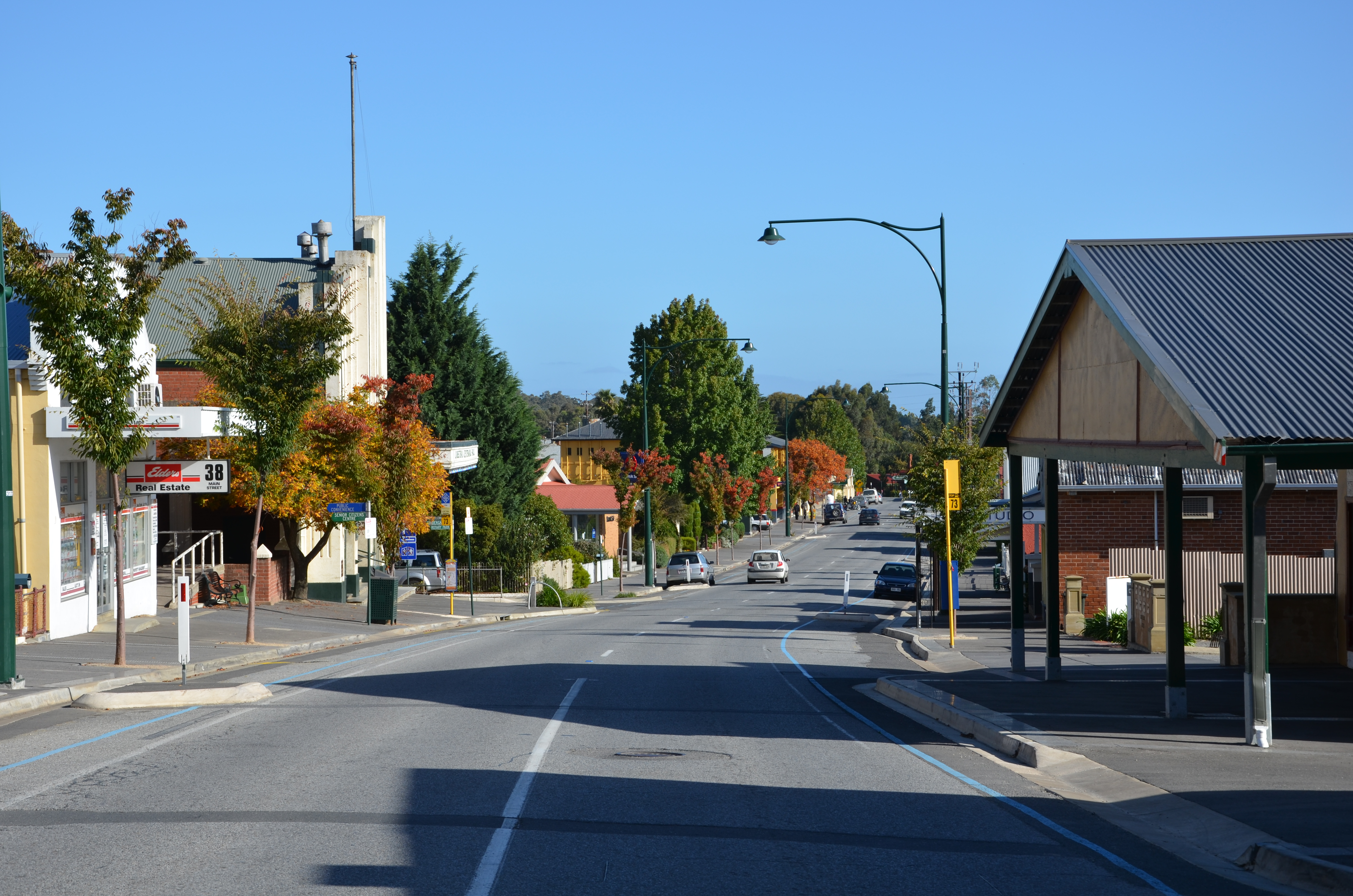
- Main Street, Lobethal

- Coordinates: 34°54′0″S 138°52′0″E
- Country: Australia
- State: South Australia
- LGA: Adelaide Hills Council
- Location: 42 km (26 mi) from Adelaide
- Established: 1842

Government
  - State electorate: Morialta
  - Federal division: Mayo

Population
  - Total: 2,174 (UCL 2021)
- Postcode: 5241
Localities around Lobethal
| Cudlee Creek | Kenton Valley | Mount Torrens |
| Lenswood | Lobethal | Schoenthal Charleston |
| Lenswood | Woodside | Woodside |

Lobethal (/ˈloʊbəθəl/ LOH-bə-thəl; German: [ˈloːbətaːl]) is a town in the Adelaide Hills area of South Australia. It is located in the Adelaide Hills Council local government area, and is nestled on the banks of a creek between the hills and up the sides of the valley. It was once the centre of the Adelaide Hills wool processing industry, which continued until around 1950. The mill buildings are now used by a number of cottage industry and handcraft businesses. At the 2016 census, Lobethal had a population of 2,135.

The town is famed during the Christmas season for its display of Christmas lights and decorations, which have attracted visitors from around the state since the 1950s.

== History ==
Lobethal was settled in 1842 by Prussian immigrants, who migrated to South Australia with Pastor Gotthard Fritzsche aboard the sailing vessel Skjold, who initially went to Hahndorf but were alerted to good land in the upper Onkaparinga. German Lutheran settlers provided compatriot, Johann Friedrich Krummnow, who had arrived in South Australia three years earlier and was a naturalised English citizen, with funds for land purchases to establish the community. Krummnow wanted it based on his own principles of shared property and fervent prayer. The Lobethal settlers rejected Krummnow's vision and legally disputed his right to the land titles.

"Lobethal" is German for "valley of praise". On the day of the division of the land, according to Reverend I. Ey's account, 'it received the name Lobethal, taken from the II Book of Chronicles, chapter 20, verse 26 (EN) (DE), which, according to Luther's translation, means Lobethal or 'Valley of praise'.

The town, as with many German towns in South Australia, was built in typical Silesian Hufendorf style, with the cottages arranged in a line along the main street, and each family having a long, narrow strip of land (used for growing crops) stretching from the main street back to the village common, where all families could allow their animals to graze. The advantages of this layout were that everyone had access to both fresh water and the main road, and a relatively even distribution of fertile and infertile land. While the town has developed out of recognition (the main street was Mill Road, now the western boundary of the town), elements of the Hufendorf layout remain.

Lutheranism in Lobethal has a checkered history, with two rival church buildings and at least one more church assembly:

=== St John's Lutheran Church ===
In 1842 zum Weinberge Christi ("Christ's Vineyard") was founded by Fritzsche, and St John's Lutheran Church, Lobethal, was built in 1845. Fritzsche lived in Lobethal from 1843 till his death; in later years he was assisted by Carl Heinrich Loessel (Lössel). After Fritzsche's death his congregation demanded the sacking of Loessel, and from 1871 were led by Rev. Lebrecht Friedrich Ehregott Krause, but he was expelled from the church and the Evangelical synod in May 1876.

In the late 20th-century St John's was recognised as the oldest Lutheran church building in Australia. A new church was built alongside.

=== St Paul's Lutheran Church ===
St Paul's church was founded by Adelbert Fiedler in 1853, some say in reaction to Fritzsche's prohibition of dancing. The church was built in 1858. Rev. Georg Ludwig Adelbert Fiedler (born 9 December 1820), commonly known as Adelbert (or Adalbert) Fiedler, was a German minister of religion, pastor of St Paul's Lutheran Church, Lobethal. He was associated with the Evangelical Lutheran synod.

It is likely he arrived in 1858 with his wife and two children aboard Ohio from Bremen. A genealogy site has him married to Marie Antoinette Therese Fiedler (née Büttger), and father of Theodor Wilhelm Renatus Fiedler and Emilie Georgine Dominika Fiedler. He was registered by the South Australian Government as an officiating minister in May 1858, and further empowered to grant marriage licences in June 1858. Functions at which he officiated include:

- Sermon at St Paul's Lutheran Church, Lobethal, stone laying ceremony.
- In 1871 he led an open-air assembly at Tanunda in a hymn of thanks that he composed for the occasion, and a prayer for peace, following the German victory over France.
- He conducted a confirmation ceremony at the Dreifaltigkeit's Kirche on Angas St. on 4 June 1871.
- He was reported as "Albert Fiedler" when he married Adolph H. F. Bartels to Anna Weidenbach. This error (if that's what it was) was promulgated through other newspapers but not seen elsewhere.

He purchased a property under the Real Property Act in 1874. "Georg Ludwig Adelbert Fiedler, Hahndörf—Lottheil 112 von Section 6004, Ortschaft Hahndorf, Hundert Onkaparinga, 14 März." He returned to Germany by the Orient in 1874, his last act being to call for his followers to rejoin Loessel.

=== A third church ===
Around 1871 Loessel created a third church; he died in 1879, and Krause took over his flock at St Paul's, causing dissension among his followers. Krause and St Paul's congregation joined the Immanuel Synod in 1884. Krause died in 1885, and was succeeded at St Paul's by Carl Friedrich Braun.

After amalgamation in 1921 this "Church of Christ's Manger" (zum Kripplein Christi) congregation united with St Paul's and sold its property to the Church of England. Pastor Braun officiated over the combined congregations at St Paul's till 1937, when he was succeeded by Pastor Petering.

Many of the settlers' traditions remain to this day, although the town is not as overtly Germanic as Hahndorf or Tanunda.

=== Other industries ===
In 1850, F. W. Kleinschmidt set up a brewery. It closed after about two decades when Kleinschmidt turned his attention to hop-growing – which subsequently became a focus for Lobethal's agriculture. The brewery itself was turned into the Lobethal Tweed Factory, which became the Onkaparinga Woollen Company and operated until 1992.

A cricket bat factory utilising locally grown willow operated from 1894 to 1950.

Due to the Great War in Europe, in 1917 the South Australian state government changed many German place names. The name Lobethal was changed to Tweedvale (honouring the town's major industry). Lobethal was re-instated as the town's name with the enactment of the South Australia Nomenclature Act of 1935 on 12 December 1935.

== Geography ==
Lobethal is located between Gumeracha and Woodside along the north–south road, and east of Adelaide via Magill and Norton Summit.

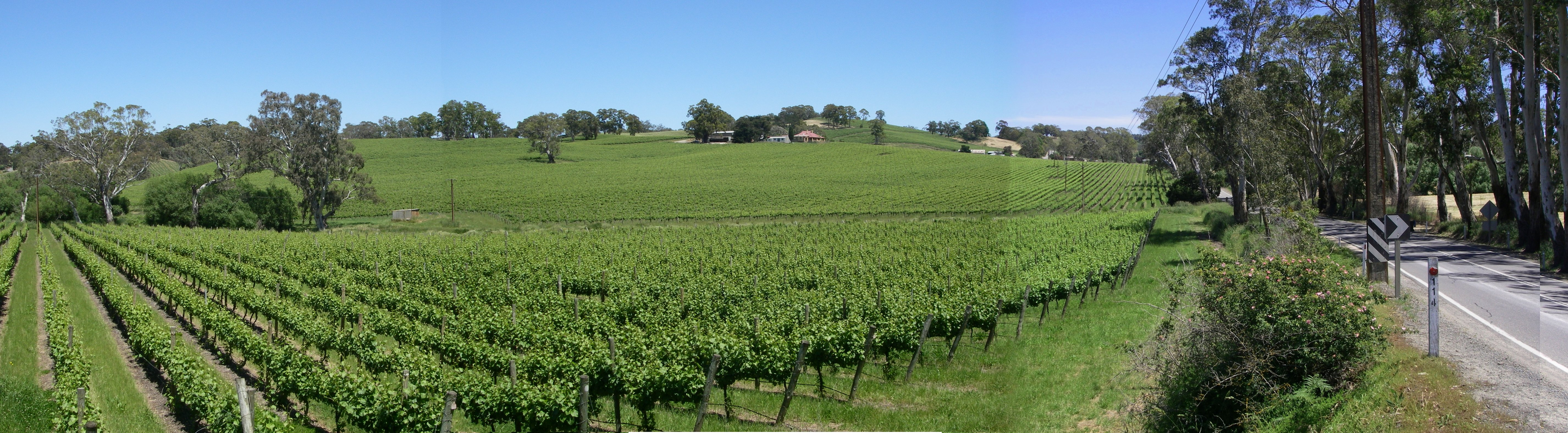
Vineyard on the Adelaide-Lobethal Road, just outside the township of Lobethal

=== Suburbs ===
- Schoenthal
- Neudorf
- Tabor Valley
- South Lobethal
- East Lobethal

=== Climate ===
After a snowstorm at Lobethal, 28 July 1901.

Lobethal has a Warm-Summer Mediterranean climate abbreviated Csb on the Köppen-Scale.

Climate data for Lobethal
| Month | Jan | Feb | Mar | Apr | May | Jun | Jul | Aug | Sep | Oct | Nov | Dec | Year |
|---|---|---|---|---|---|---|---|---|---|---|---|---|---|
| Mean daily maximum °C (°F) | 25.0 (77.0) | 26.0 (78.8) | 23.0 (73.4) | 19.0 (66.2) | 15.0 (59.0) | 12.0 (53.6) | 11.0 (51.8) | 13.0 (55.4) | 15.0 (59.0) | 18.0 (64.4) | 21.0 (69.8) | 23.0 (73.4) | 18.4 (65.1) |
| Daily mean °C (°F) | 19.0 (66.2) | 20.0 (68.0) | 17.5 (63.5) | 14.5 (58.1) | 12.0 (53.6) | 9.5 (49.1) | 8.5 (47.3) | 9.5 (49.1) | 11.0 (51.8) | 13.0 (55.4) | 15.5 (59.9) | 17.5 (63.5) | 14.0 (57.1) |
| Mean daily minimum °C (°F) | 13.0 (55.4) | 14.0 (57.2) | 12.0 (53.6) | 10.0 (50.0) | 9.0 (48.2) | 7.0 (44.6) | 6.0 (42.8) | 6.0 (42.8) | 7.0 (44.6) | 8.0 (46.4) | 10.0 (50.0) | 12.0 (53.6) | 9.5 (49.1) |
| Average rainfall mm (inches) | 25.3 (1.00) | 19.2 (0.76) | 33.9 (1.33) | 56.8 (2.24) | 90.5 (3.56) | 117.3 (4.62) | 138.4 (5.45) | 120.5 (4.74) | 100.4 (3.95) | 63.4 (2.50) | 37.8 (1.49) | 36.5 (1.44) | 840 (33.08) |
| Average rainy days | 3 | 2 | 3 | 6 | 9 | 12 | 13 | 13 | 10 | 7 | 4 | 4 | 86 |
Source: NOAA.

== Facilities ==
Lobethal contains two hotels, two primary schools and a Country Fire Service station.

The Lutheran Church complex, and the Archives and Historical Museum, contain information about the lives of the towns German settlers, and are open to the public year-round.

Lobethal Bierhaus is a brewery located on the Main Street of the town. It makes both English and German style beers.

The Lobethal Bakery provides a selection of German style breads and cakes.

There are many artisan producers based in the old woollen mill facility.

Lobethal, and the surrounding area, contains many Wineries and a growing number of cellar doors.

== Culture ==
The town is famous around Adelaide for its display of Christmas lights along its main streets in December each year; many residents also adorn their front gardens and verandahs with elaborate displays. The tradition began in the 1950s and is the largest Christmas display in South Australia. In 2019, however, the events were cancelled after big bush fires caused widespread damage.

The area is fast becoming known for its many producers of food and beverages.

== Transport ==
The area is serviced by Adelaide Metro. Buses run from Lobethal to the Adelaide CBD via the South Eastern Freeway and Onkaparinga Valley Road. There are also buses from Lobethal to Verdun Junction and Mount Barker.

== Motorsport ==
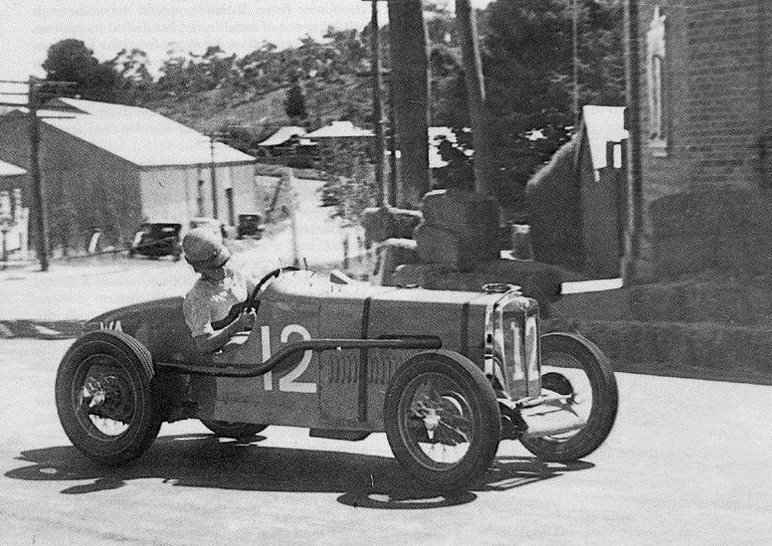
Race winner Allan Tomlinson (MG TA) contesting the 1939 Australian Grand Prix on the Lobethal Circuit

Lobethal was the host town for the 1939 Australian Grand Prix, Australia's premier motor race of that year. The race, which was won by Alan Tomlinson driving an MG TA, was staged on the Lobethal Circuit which comprised public roads in and around the town. The circuit was used for four race meetings from 1937 through to 1948.
