= Mount Torrens, South Australia =

Mount Torrens South Australia
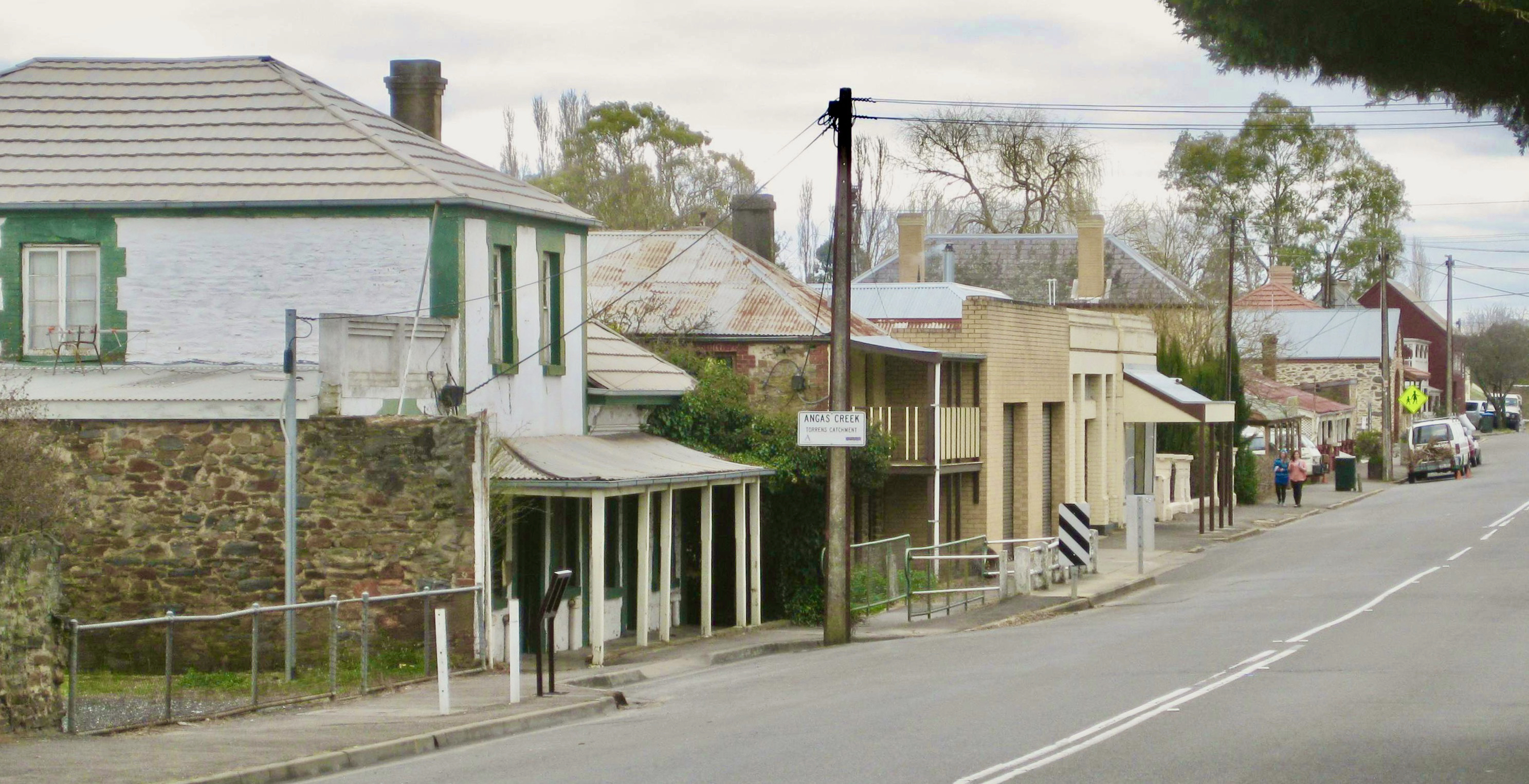
- Main street of Mount Torrens

- Coordinates: 34°52′30″S 138°57′26″E
- Population: 324 (UCL 2021)
- Established: 1840s
- Postcode(s): 5244
- Location: 46 km (29 mi) from Adelaide
- LGA(s): Adelaide Hills Council; Mid Murray Council
- State electorate(s): Morialta
- Federal division(s): Mayo
Localities around Mount Torrens:
Gumeracha	Birdwood	Tungkillo
Kenton Valley	Mount Torrens	Tungkillo
Lobethal	Charleston	Harrogate

Mount Torrens is a small town in the eastern Adelaide Hills region of South Australia, 46 kilometres (29 miles) east-north-east of the state capital, Adelaide and 8 kilometres (5 miles) east of Lobethal. It is on Onkaparinga Valley Road (B34) between the towns of Charleston and Birdwood. It is the eastern end of the Amy Gillett Bikeway, which follows the former railway alignment from Oakbank. Mount Torrens is within the jurisdiction of the Adelaide Hills Council and the Mid Murray Council.

== Etymology ==
The Indigenous name for the mount is unknown. The first Europeans to ascend it, on 25 January 1838, were the exploration party of Dr George Imlay and John Hill, but they did not name it. The mount and nearby town were named later after Robert Torrens, one of South Australia's founding fathers as chairman of the South Australian Colonisation Commission.

== History ==
The town was developed by the Dunn family in the early 1840s. Then known as Barton Springs, it incorporated a farmhouse, smithy, stables and the Cornish Arms inn. The town proper was laid out in 1853 to serve the River Murray trade at Mannum and a nearby copper mine. A small gold deposit was discovered in 1870, but by World War I the town's importance had diminished, and the town that stands today is virtually unchanged since that time.

== Facilities ==
Mount Torrens has a sporting ground, hotel, farm supply store and general store. There are two schools – the state government Mount Torrens Primary School (Now Closed Down) and the co-educational, interdenominational Mount Torrens Christian school – and Anglican, Lutheran and Uniting churches. In 2019, Mount Torrens became part of the Adelaide Hills Sculpture Trail. The former site of the fire station was made into a small park which houses the sculpture. Several historic buildings are in the town.

Mount Torrens and the surrounding areas were damaged during the 2019 Cudlee Creek bushfire.

== Transport ==
Mount Torrens is on the LinkSA coach route that runs from Mount Pleasant to Tea Tree Plaza. Between 1918 and 1963 the town had a station on the Mount Pleasant railway line; subsequently the line was dismantled.
