= Springhead =

Springhead may refer to:

- Springhead, Kent, a village in Kent, England
- Springhead Motorshark, the fourth studio album by American glam metal band Britny Fox
- Springhead, Greater Manchester, suburban area in the civil parish of Saddleworth
- Springhead, Barbados in the parishes of Saint Andrew and Saint James, Barbados
- Springhead Pumping Station, former pumping station in Hull, England
- Springhead engine shed (1885-1961, demolished), Hull, England
- Springhead Halt railway station, a former railway station on the Hull and Barnsley Railway

== See also ==
- Springhead Park (disambiguation)
