= Carl Loessel =

German-born Lutheran pastor and teacher

Carl Heinrich Conrad Loessel [Lössel] (30 October 1812 – 24 December 1879), was a founder of the Lutheran Church in Flinders Street, Adelaide, and pastor of the church at Lobethal.

== Early life and education ==
Carl Heinrich Conrad Loessel was born on 30 October 1812 in Cassel, Germany.

He earned a PhD in Jena or Halle.

== Career ==
Loessel was ordained minister of the Evangelical Lutheran Church in Germany and held appointments in Berlin and other places in Germany. He was the author of a number of books, mostly religious, through which he became acquainted with the King of Prussia. A widower, he emigrated to the colony of South Australia, arriving in October 1863 aboard Coorong from Victoria accompanied by a daughter and two sons.

In 1864 he served at J. L. Young's Adelaide Educational Institution as German and French master. One G. Loessel was a student at the school in that same year. In March that year he was registered as a person authorised to grant marriage licences. He had a residence in Carrington Street at the time.

He was associated with the Lutheran community in Woodside, some 8 km (5.0 mi) south of Lobethal, in the laying of the foundation stone of their building on 31 October 1864, the anniversary of the Reformation. Loessel officiated at the opening ceremony and service on 23 April 1865.

He was appointed pastor of the Evangelical Lutheran Bethlehem congregations to serve as pastor in their Adelaide church, near Light Square, and at Windsor from 15 November 1866. After a poorly attended general meeting of the congregation, to which he was not invited, on 17 June 1866 he found that he was locked out of the city church and was advised that his services were no longer required. He sued Carl Otto, C. Lührs, A. H. W. Meyer, J. Weil, J. W. A. Sudholz, and Johann Peter Remmey, the instigators, for wrongful dismissal, as he had fulfilled all the requirements of his appointment and had not behaved in an improper manner. After a considerable legal tussle between Loessel's lawyers Way and Bundey, and Stow, Q.C. for the defendants, the verdict came for the defendants, awarding nominal damages of £70 to Loessel.

In July 1867, having lost the pastorate of the Light Square Church, Loessel took a lease on the old Ebenezer Place Baptist chapel, with the intention of attracting his own congregation. Later that year he was a teacher at Georg Heinrich (or George Henry) Reinhard's German school at Lobethal. He still owned the property at Woodside.

He was the first pastor of the Lutheran congregation at Reedy Creek (now Palmer), serving from 22 May 1869 until he was succeeded by Pastor Kuss, who served both Palmer and Mannum. The church honored Loessel at its 60th anniversary on 22 September 1929, two years after the replacement of the old building with the present beautifully maintained structure.

In 1871 he was in Mount Gambier, where he held German-language classes at the Institute, but failed do attract enough students to make it a paying proposition. In 1872 he was German master at Mr. Denovan's school at Mount Gambier, leaving in October for Adelaide thence to Germany.

== Later life and death ==
By November 1873 he was back in South Australia, teaching at W. Nadebaum's school in Lobethal.

He was appointed to the pastorate of Lobethal, where he died on 24 December 1879.

== Family ==
- Johannes "John" Loessel (c. 1847 – c. 15 November 1876) married Johanna Eggers (c. 1852 – 31 March 1902) on 8 February 1868. He was a bank officer; she taught pianoforte and singing at Angas Street east, off Hutt Street. He became a merchant, and made news when he imported of meerschaum pipes which incorporated miniature photographs accused of being pornographic. He was found insolvent and left Australia for New Zealand, where he travelled under the name of "Thomas", and was drowned in the Kawarau River.

- Rhea Maria Loessel ( – 19 September 1946) was also a fine musician

- Maria Helene Loessel ( – 1 July 1941) married composer and musician Carl Püttmann on 28 December 1866. Her father was the celebrant.
- Friedrich Wilhelm Albert Loessel (c. 1849 – 6 March 1867)

Loessel married Sophia Charlotte Kermine Piper ( – 1897) in 1864. Their family included:

- Hermine Alma Helene Loessel (1866 – 26 September 1952) was a teacher and craft worker, living at 208 Beulah Road
- Johanna Ida Louise Loessel (22 September 1868 – ) married Francis Charles Kelly in 1889
- (Carl Henrich) Hermann Loessel (1871 – 28 April 1951) died in California
- Lucia Marie Louise Loessel (1873 – 30 August 1951) married Charles Alfred Richard Hill ( – 19 November 1917) in 1907, lived in South Perth, Western Australia.
