= List of Australian place names changed from German names =

During World War I, many German or German-sounding place names in Australia were changed due to anti-German sentiment. This occurred to a lesser extent also during World War II. The presence of German-derived place names was seen as an affront to the war effort at the time.

The names were often changed by being anglicised (such as Peterborough), or by being given new names of Aboriginal origin (Kobandilla, Karawirra) or in commemoration of notable soldiers (Kitchener and Holbrook) or World War I battlefields (Verdun, The Somme).

== New South Wales ==
| Old name | New name | Date of name change | Notes |
|---|---|---|---|
| Bismarck Street (Canterbury) | Cressy Street | December 1914 | |
| Bismarck Street (Kogarah) | Kitchener Street | 10 November 1914 | |
| Deutschland Street (Canterbury) | Onslow Street | December 1914 | |
| Germanton | Holbrook | 20 September 1915 | |
| German's Hill | Lidster | 1 February 1916 | |
| German Creek | Empire Vale | 1 May 1915 | |
| Hamburger Street (Punchbowl) | Victoria Road | December 1914 | |
| Kaiser Street (Canterbury) | Mons Street | December 1914 | |
| Reuss Street (Merewether) | Kilgour Avenue | 14 January 1918 | Newcastle section renamed 1918. Merewether Municipality section Reuss Street until 1938. |
| Schlinkers Lane (Ultimo, Sydney) | Bullecourt Lane | 1917 | No longer exists. Development on 428–466 Harris Street, Ultimo is named "Bullecourt Place". |
| Webber's Road (Kogarah) | English Street | 7 September 1915 | |

== Queensland ==
| Old name | New name | Date of name change | Coordinates | Notes |
|---|---|---|---|---|
| Bergen | Murra Murra | October 1916 | 27.24°S 151.9208°E | Bergen is a locality in the Toowoomba Region, Queensland. Murra Murra is a property within the locality (not to be confused with another property of the same name in the locality of Nebine) |
| Bergenside | Neuve | August 1916 | 27.2603°S 151.8906°E | Neuve is a village within the locality of Bergen. It surrounds the former railway station. |
| Bismarck | Maclagan | March 1916 | 27.0838°S 151.635°E | |
| Engelsburg | Kalbar | July 1916 | 27.9419°S 152.6233°E | |
| Fahley | Kilbirnie | | 27.2322°S 151.8238°E | |
| Friezland | Kuridala | | 21.1027°S 140.3825°E | |
| Gehrkevale | Mount Mort | | 27.7855°S 152.4377°E | The Post Office was renamed Mount Grace in about September 1916, then Mount Mort in about November 1916 |
| German Gardens | Belgian Gardens | January 1915 | 19.2491°S 146.7919°E | |
| Gramzow | Carbrook | | 27.6599°S 153.2138°E | |
| Hapsburg | Kowbi | October 1916 | 25.1786°S 152.2297°E | See Isis railway line |
| Hessenburg | Ingoldsby | September 1916 | 27.7366°S 152.2663°E | |
| Kirchheim | Haigslea | October 1916 | 27.5667°S 152.6333°E | |
| Marburg | Townshend | June 1917 | 27.5672°S 152.5947°E | reverted to Marburg in 1920 |
| Minden | Frenchton | October 1916 | 27.5570°S 152.5455°E | reverted to Minden in 1930 |
| Roessler | Applethorpe | | 28.6175°S 151.9552°E | |
| Teutoburg | Witta | 1916 | 26.6975°S 152.8119°E | |

== South Australia ==
The South Australian Nomenclature Act 1917 authorised the compilation and gazetting of a list of place-names contained in a report of the previous October prepared by a parliamentary "nomenclature committee", and authorised the Governor of South Australia, by proclamation, to "alter any place-name which he deems to be of enemy origin to some other name specified in the proclamation". The table below includes the 69 changes gazetted on 10 January 1918.

The Nomenclature Act 1935 restored the former names of the towns of Hahndorf and Lobethal, and the Adelaide suburb of Klemzig. About 20 other names were reverted in the 1970s and 1980s; some of them were assigned to larger localities rather than reverting to the original place name, as also shown in the table.

| Old name | New name | Date of name change | Notes |
|---|---|---|---|
| Bartsch's Creek | Yedlakoo Creek | 10 January 1918 | Reverted to Bartsch Creek 1986 |
| Berlin Rock | Panpandie Rock | 10 January 1918 | |
| Bethanien | Bethany | 10 January 1918 | |
| Bismarck | Weeroopa | 10 January 1918 | |
| Blumberg | Birdwood | 10 January 1918 | |
| Blumenthal | Lakkari | 10 January 1918 | |
| Buchfelde | Loos | 10 January 1918 | Reverted to Buchfelde |
| Cape Bauer | Cape Wondoma | 10 January 1918 | Reverted to Cape Bauer in 1948 |
| Carlsruhe | Kunden | 10 January 1918 | |
| Ehrenbreistein | Mount Yerila | 10 January 1918 | |
| Ferdinand Creek | Ernabella Creek | 10 January 1918 | |
| Mount Ferdinand | Mount Warrabillinna | 10 January 1918 | |
| Friedrichstadt | Tangari | 10 January 1918 | |
| Friedrichswalde | Tarnma | 10 January 1918 | |
| Gebhardt's Hills | Polygon Ridge | 10 January 1918 | Reverted to Gebhardt Hills in 1986 |
| German Creek | Benara Creek | 10 January 1918 | Reverted in 1986 |
| German Pass | Tappa Pass | 10 January 1918 | |
| Germantown Hill | Vimy Ridge | 10 January 1918 | Became part of Bridgewater; road name (only) reverted to Germantown Hill Road |
| Gottlieb's Well | Parnggi Well | 10 January 1918 | |
| Grunberg | Karalta | 10 January 1918 | Reverted to Gruenberg in 1975 |
| Grunthal | Verdun | 10 January 1918 | |
| Hahndorf | Ambleside | 10 January 1918 | Reverted to Hahndorf in 1935 |
| Hasse's Mound | Larelar Mound | 10 January 1918 | |
| Heidelberg | Kobandilla | 10 January 1918 | |
| Hergott Springs | Marree | 10 January 1918 | |
| Hildesheim | Punthari | 10 January 1918 | |
| Hoffnungsthal | Karawirra | 10 January 1918 | Reverted to Hoffnungsthal in 1975 |
| Hundred of Basedow | Hundred of French | 10 January 1918 | |
| Hundred of Homburg | Hundred of Haig | 10 January 1918 | |
| Hundred of Krichauff | Hundred of Beatty | 10 January 1918 | |
| Hundred of Paech | Hundred of Cannawigara | 10 January 1918 | |
| Hundred of Pflaum | Hundred of Geegeela | 10 January 1918 | |
| Hundred of Rhine (North) | Hundred of Jellicoe | 10 January 1918 | |
| Hundred of Rhine (South) | Hundred of Jutland | 10 January 1918 | |
| Hundred of Scherk | Hundred of Sturdee | 10 January 1918 | |
| Hundred of Schomburgk | Hundred of Maude | 10 January 1918 | |
| Hundred of Von Doussa | Hundred of Allenby | 10 January 1918 | |
| Jaenschtown | Kerkanya | 10 January 1918 | |
| Kaiserstuhl | Mount Kitchener | 10 January 1918 | Renamed Kaiser's Seat in 1975; subsequently changed to Kaiserstuhl |
| Klaebes | Kilto | 10 January 1918 | |
| Klemzig | Gaza | 10 January 1918 | Reverted to Klemzig in 1935; football club retained the name Gaza |
| Krause Rock | Marti Rock | 10 January 1918 | |
| Krichauff | Beatty | 10 January 1918 | Changed to Mount Mary 1940 |
| Kronsdorf | Kabminye | 10 January 1918 | Changed to Krondorf in 1975 |
| Langdorf | Kaldukee | 10 January 1918 | Incorporated in the bounded locality of Tanunda |
| Langmeil | Bilyara (near Tanunda) | 10 January 1918 | Reverted to Langmeil in 1975 |
| Lobethal | Tweedvale | 10 January 1918 | Reverted to Lobethal in 1935 |
| Mount Meyer | Mount Kauto | 10 January 1918 | |
| Muller's Hill | Yandina Hill | 10 January 1918 | |
| Neudorf | Mamburdi | 10 January 1918 | Reverted 1986, became part of Lobethal |
| Neukirch | Dimchurch | 10 January 1918 | Reverted to Neukirch in 1975 |
| New Hamburg | Willyaroo | 10 January 1918 | |
| New Mecklenburg | Gomersal | 10 January 1918 | |
| Oliventhal | Olivedale | 10 January 1918 | Became part of Birdwood |
| Petersburg | Peterborough | 10 January 1918 | The Petersburg Times protested against the change until 1919. |
| Rhine Park | Kongolia | 10 January 1918 | |
| Rhine Hill | Mons Hill | 10 January 1918 | |
| Rhine River North | The Somme | 10 January 1918 | Changed to Somme Creek 1971 |
| Rhine River South | The Marne | 10 January 1918 | Changed to Marne River 1971 |
| Rhine Villa | Cambrai | 10 January 1918 | |
| Rosenthal | Rosedale | 10 January 1918 | |
| Schoenthal | Boongala | 10 January 1918 | Reverted 1986; incorporated in the bounded locality of Charleston |
| Seppelts | Dorrien | 10 January 1918 | Incorporated into the bounded locality of Nuriootpa |
| Schreiberhau | Warre | 10 January 1918 | Reverted 1975 |
| Siegersdorf | Bultawilta | 10 January 1918 | Reverted in 1975; incorporated into the bounded locality of Tanunda |
| Steinfeld | Stonefield | 10 January 1918 | Reverted 1986 |
| Summerfeldt | Summerfield | 10 January 1918 | Incorporated into the bounded locality of Palmer |
| Vogelsang's Corner | Teerkoore | 10 January 1918 | Reverted to Vogelsang Corner 1986; incorporated into the bounded locality of Geranium Plains |
| Wusser's Nob | Karun Nob | 10 January 1918 | Changed to Wusser Nob in 1983 |

== Tasmania ==
| Old name | New name | Date of name change | Notes |
|---|---|---|---|
| Bismarck | Collinsvale | 1 July 1915 | |
| Germantown | Lilydale | | |

== Victoria ==
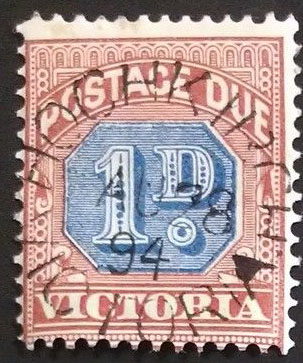
Victorian stamp with Hochkirch postmark

| Old name | New name | Date of name change | Notes |
|---|---|---|---|
| Berlin Street, Richmond | Barkly Avenue | March 1916 | |
| Bismarck Avenue, Surrey Hills | Warwick Avenue | December 1918 | |
| Bismarck Street, Doncaster | Victoria Street | February 1916 | |
| Bismark Street, Malvern East | Hughes Street | February 1916 | |
| Fischer Street, Malvern East | Fisher Street | February 1916 | |
| Frankfort Street, Richmond | Burgess Street | March 1916 | |
| Germantown | Grovedale | 1 March 1916 | Originally authorised to be renamed to 'Cornwall'. |
| Grünwald | Arkona | | |
| Hamburg Street, Richmond | Cotter Street | October 1940 | Originally proposed to be renamed to 'Anzac Street' in 1916 but did not proceed. |
| Hanover Street, Prahran | McIlwrick Street | March 1917 | |
| Hochkirch | Tarrington | 1 March 1918 | |
| Mount Bismarck | Mount Kitchener | | |
| Reinholtz's PO | Reynold's PO | 5 November 1920 | |
| Waldau Road, Doncaster | George Street | February 1916 | |
| Waldkirch | Freshwater Creek (Anglesea Road, south-west of Grovedale) | | |
| Weinberg Road, Hawthorn | Wattle Road | | |
| West Prussia Road, Wantirna | Wantirna Road | | |
| Wilhelm Street, Doncaster | King Street | February 1916 | |

== Western Australia ==
| Old name | New name | Date of name change | Notes |
|---|---|---|---|
| Heidelberg | Bickley | | |
| Mueller Park | Kitchener Park | | reverted to Mueller Park 1981 |

== See also ==
- German Australian
- German settlement in Australia
- Berlin to Kitchener name change, parallel phenomenon in Canada
- Kitchener bun
