= Hoffnungsthal, South Australia =

Former settlement in South Australia

Hoffnungsthal
- Coordinates: 34°36′S 138°54′E
- Country: Australia
- State: South Australia
- Region: Barossa Valley
- Established: 1847
- Abolished: 1853

Hoffnungsthal (lit. 'Valley of Hope' in German; German: [ˈhɔfnʊŋsˌtaːl]) is the location of a former German pioneer settlement, located in South Australia's Barossa Valley. Founded in 1847, it was located in an ephemeral lagoon which was dry for the first years of settlement. Local Peramangk people warned the settlers that the area was prone to flooding, but this advice was ignored. In October 1853, after a week of heavy spring rains, the village was flooded and many of the houses were evacuated. After the cost of a proposed drain was seen as prohibitive, the village was eventually left deserted. Most of the settlers moved to the Barossa village of Bethanien as well as further afield.

Built on higher ground, the Lutheran church was still used until 1867, when the building was also abandoned.

In the local Peramangk language, Hoffnungsthal was named Yertalla-ngga (lit. 'flooding land') and between the years 1917 to 1975, it was called Karawirra as part of the changes to German sounding place names during World War I.

All that remains of the village today are the foundations of the church with a commemorative plaque honouring those buried in the now unmarked cemetery.

== Taken from the Beinke Family History Book ==
Today, Hoffnungsthal, or what remains of it, is quiet, peaceful, soothing, a place where one can meditate, a place which seems eternal. It is hard to imagine that it once hummed with activity, and supported a thriving community for six years. Nor does it seem the place which was a broiling maelstrom, a nightmare of wind and rain and surging drama and neither does it seem a place of lost and destroyed dreams, a place of grief and tears. But it has been all of these.

On a summer's day, very late in December 1847, a small group of immigrants, most of whom came from the Gellert, gathered in the little town of Lyndoch. They were there to receive the grants of land which they had agreed to lease from the South Australian Company for twenty one years. The land was situated at the base of the Barossa Range, about 1.5 kilometres [0.93 mi] east of Lyndoch. The grants ranged from 8.1 to 3.2 hectares [20 to 8 acres]. In the centre was a vale, which seemed an ideal place to situate their village. They called it Hoffnungsthal, or Valley of Hope.

== See also ==
- German settlement in Australia
- Barossa German
- European settlement of South Australia
