= Gumeracha, South Australia =

Gumeracha
- Town
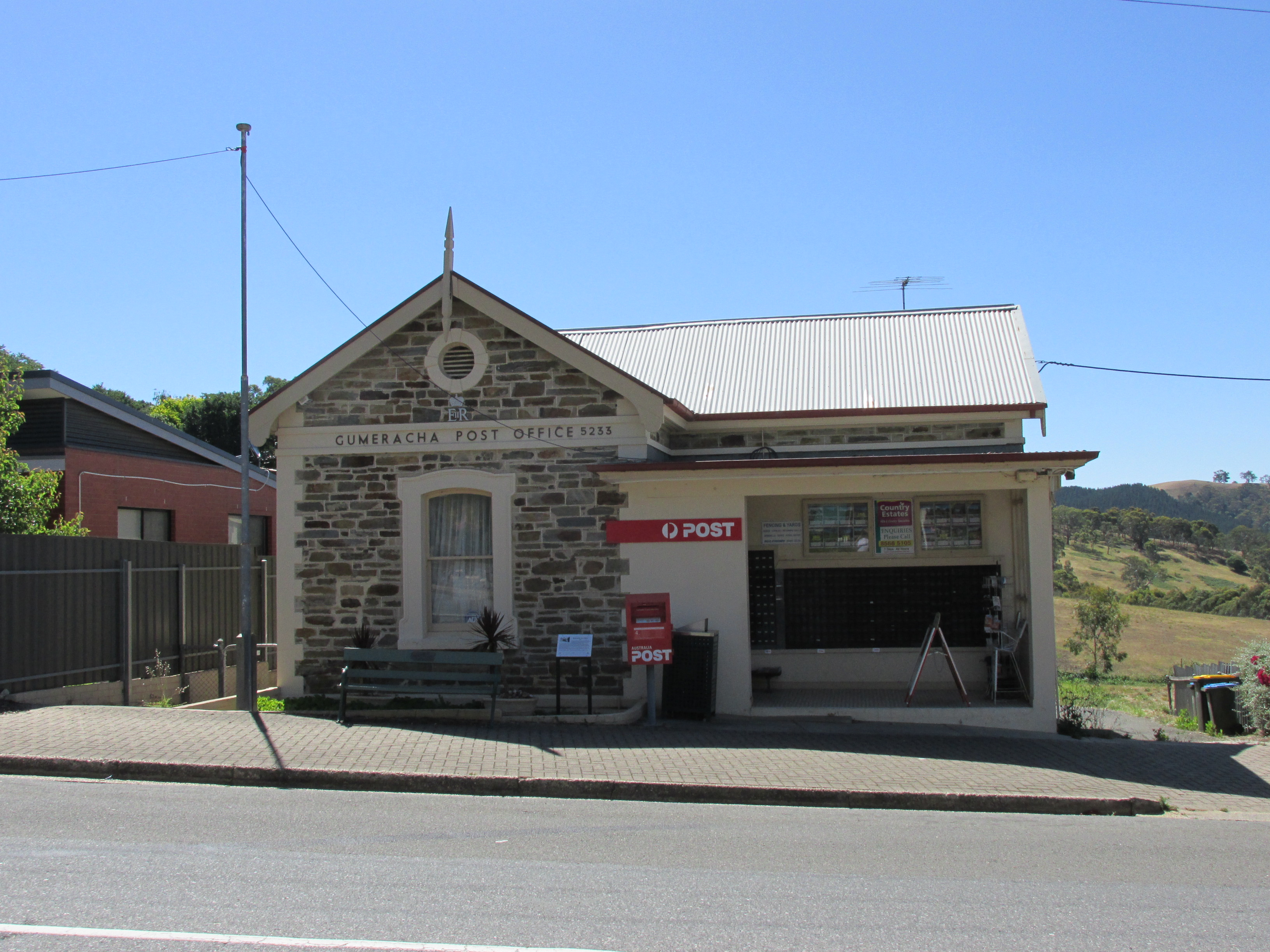
- Gumeracha Post Office.

- Coordinates: 34°49′37″S 138°53′00″E
- Country: Australia
- State: South Australia
- LGA: Adelaide Hills Council
- Location: 37 km (23 mi) from Adelaide
- Established: 1839

Government
  - State electorate: Schubert
  - Federal division: Mayo
- Elevation: 322 m (1,056 ft)

Population
  - Total: 721 (UCL 2021)
- Postcode: 5233
- Mean max temp: 19.0 °C (66.2 °F)
- Mean min temp: 9.7 °C (49.5 °F)
- Annual rainfall: 662.7 mm (26.09 in)
Localities around Gumeracha
Kersbrook	Kersbrook; Forreston	Forreston
Chain of Ponds; Cudlee Creek	Gumeracha	Birdwood; Mount Torrens
Cudlee Creek	Cudlee Creek; Kenton Valley; Mount Torrens	Mount Torrens

Gumeracha (/ˌɡʌməˈrækə/ GUM-ə-RAK-ə) is a town in the Adelaide Hills, South Australia, located on the Adelaide-Mannum Road. It is located in the Adelaide Hills Council local government area on the south bank of the upper River Torrens. The region relies heavily on grazing, dairying, grape growing, orchards, and market gardening. Its most prominent attraction is the Big Rocking Horse.

== History ==
The original inhabitants of the area were the Peramangk people, and the name "Gumeracha" derives from an Aboriginal word meaning "fine waterhole".

The area was one of the earliest settled by Europeans in South Australia. First to explore the district were Dr George Imlay and John Hill, on 24 January 1838. In 1839, the South Australia Company took up a parcel of land, on which the settlements of Gumeracha, Kenton Valley and Forreston developed. The company established a district headquarters and opened it up for sheep grazing.

In 1841, The South Australian Company built a home, known as "Ludlow House", for the first manager of the station known as "Timnath", William Beavis Randell. The company also built a flour mill in the 1840s. The estate housed his large family, his workforce and their families. In 1846, Randell donated land and funds for a church, and the Salem Baptist Church was built – the oldest Baptist church still in use in South Australia. The surrounding area, meanwhile, had become an agricultural centre, and the Gumeracha Farmers' Society held annual shows.

In 1853, the District Council of Talunga was established to administer the Hundred of Talunga, including in large part the early Adelaide Hills pioneering community that would become Gumeracha. In 1855, Randell allocated land for a township and by 1860 the town was laid out. Commercial businesses sprang up on the main street (Albert Street), and many fine buildings were erected, including the post office, police station and courthouse (1864), Gumeracha Institute, library and town hall (1909), a butter factory (1889), a school, a hospital, a coach-house, hotels, churches and business houses. Most of the buildings in use at that time still stand. William Beavis Randell's son, William Richard Randell, built the first Murray River paddlesteamer in Gumeracha in 1852.

In 1935, the District Council of Gumeracha replaced Talunga Council to administer a broader area around the town, centred at Gumeracha, the main point of population in that part of the Adelaide Hills.

== Geography ==
Gumeracha is located between Inglewood and Birdwood along the Adelaide-Mannum Road, and north of Lobethal along the Gumeracha-Lobethal Road.

At the 2021 Australian census, Gumeracha had a population of 721 people.

== Facilities ==
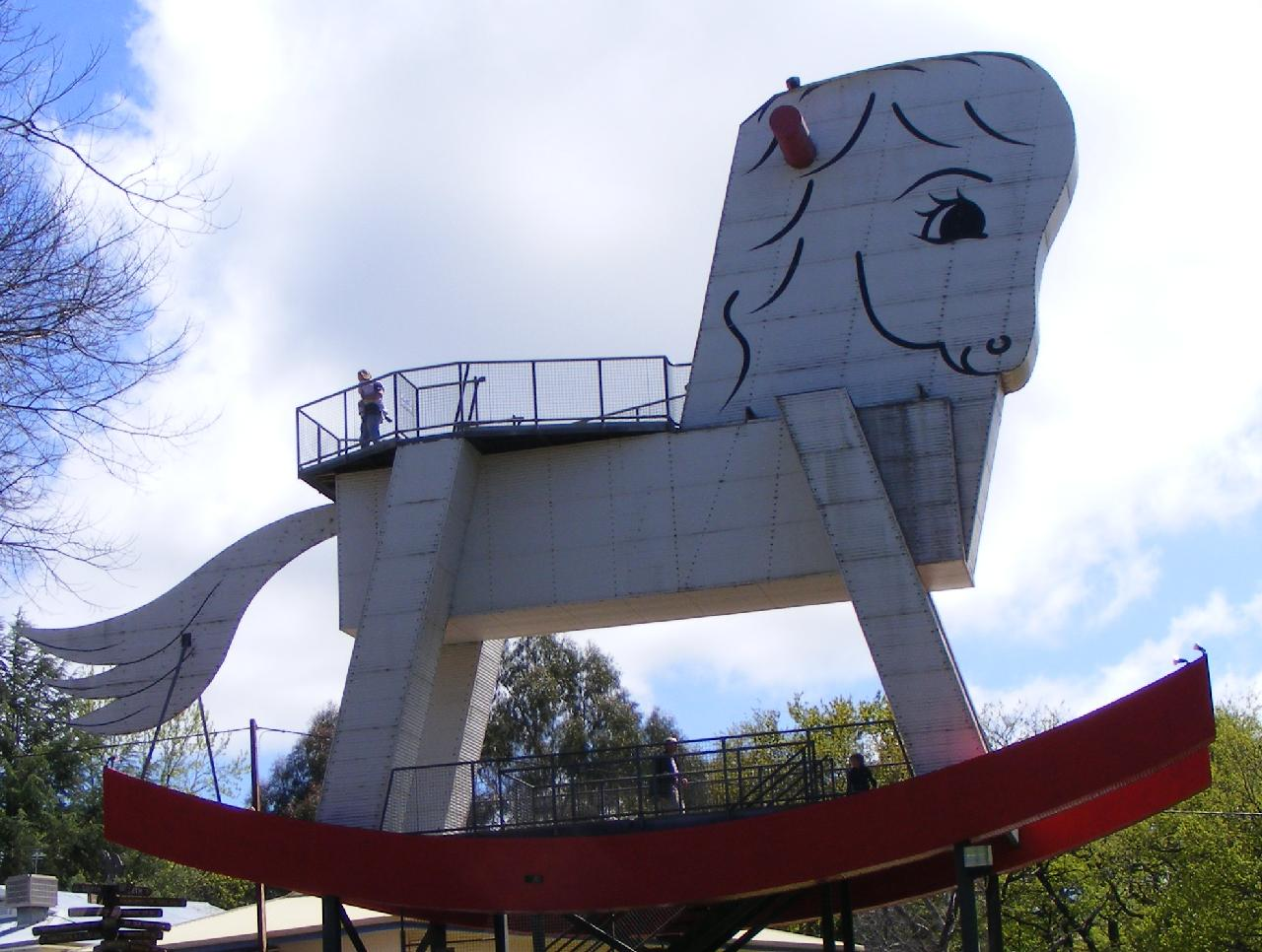
Giant rocking horse outside the toy factory

Gumeracha is the regional centre for the area. It contains a primary school, hospital, community centre, sports Adelaide Hills Council (the main office is at Woodside). There is also a golf course in Kenton Valley south of the town.

Several wineries operate in Gumeracha and in nearby areas.

The most notable attraction of Gumeracha is the "biggest rocking horse in the world" – standing at 18.3 metres (60.0 ft) (approximately the height of a six-storey building), it is just east of the town on Main Road and serves to advertise the toy factory and wildlife park.

Gumeracha is also home to Applewood Distillery, Australia's highest altitude distillery, specialising in gin and Amaro showcasing native Australian botanicals like finger limes and strawberry gum.

== Transport ==
The area is not served by Adelaide's public transport system. As of 2010 LinkSA operates a coach service from Tea Tree Plaza Interchange at Modbury to Gumeracha and Mount Pleasant.
