= Charleston, South Australia =

Charleston South Australia
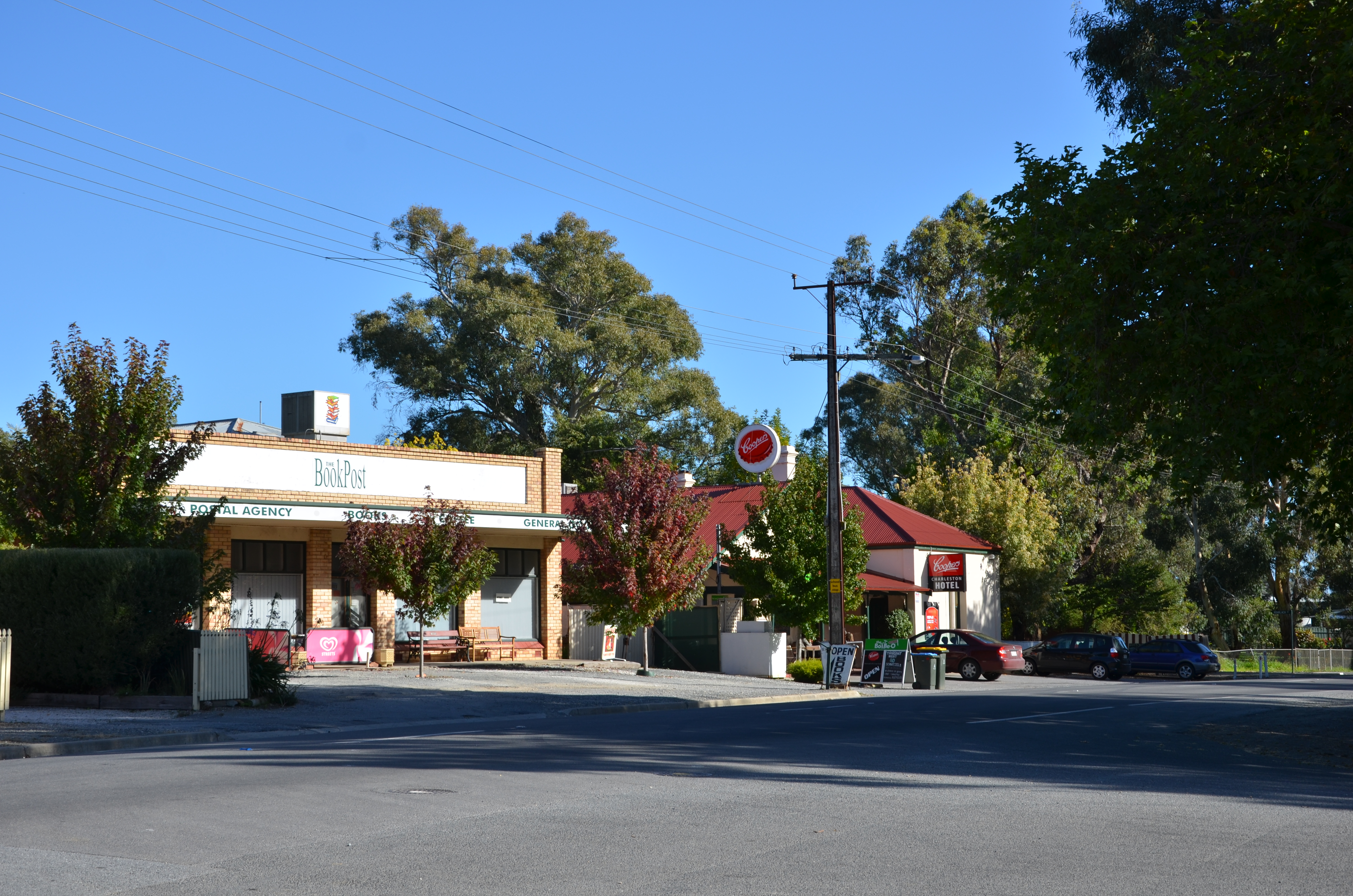
- Charleston Hotel and general store

- Coordinates: 34°55′0″S 138°54′0″E
- Population: 317 (UCL 2021)
- Postcode(s): 5244
- LGA(s): Adelaide Hills Council
- State electorate(s): Kavel
- Federal division(s): Mayo
Localities around Charleston:
Lobethal	Mount Torrens	Mount Torrens
Lobethal	Charleston	Harrogate
Woodside	Woodside	Woodside

Charleston is a small town in the Adelaide Hills of South Australia. It is situated on the Onkaparinga Valley Road between Woodside and Mount Torrens, on the main route from the Adelaide Hills to the Barossa Valley, and 3 km south-east of Lobethal. Charleston is very close to the source of the River Onkaparinga.

The town was laid out in 1857 by Charles Dunn (1796–1881), a brother of the prominent miller John Dunn, in a subdivision of section 5197, Hundred of Onkaparinga, and may have been originally named "Charlestown", but the current spelling has always been more common in newspaper reports

Most of the local businesses are on the Onkaparinga Valley Road, while the largest number of houses are on Newman Road. Charleston is served by a community postal agency called the Bookpost which is also a bookshop, internet cafe and General Store. Next to The Bookpost is the Charleston Hotel which received national attention as one of the main props in a car advertisement, based on Slim Dusty's famous song "Answer to a Pub With No Beer".

Charleston is within the limits of the Adelaide Metro bus network, and is serviced by the 835 route during school terms.

Charleston was once served by a railway line which ran from Balhannah towards Mount Pleasant. The line was closed in 1963 and removed shortly after. The former rail corridor is now the Amy Gillett Bikeway.
