= Springhead Park =

Springhead Park may refer to:

== Places ==
=== United Kingdom ===
- Springhead Park, Ebbsfleet, a development in Gravesham, England
- Springhead Park, Rothwell, a park in Yorkshire, England
