= Kenton Valley, South Australia =

Kenton Valley South Australia
- Coordinates: 34.85°S 138.89°E
- Population: 262 (SAL 2021)
- Established: 2013 (boundaries); 1839 (settlement)
- Postcode(s): 5233
- Location: 4.5 km (3 mi) south of Gumeracha; 5.5 km (3 mi) north of Lobethal
- LGA(s): Adelaide Hills Council
- State electorate(s): Morialta
- Federal division(s): Mayo
Localities around Kenton Valley:
	Gumeracha	Birdwood
Cudlee Creek	Kenton Valley
	Lobethal	Mount Torrens

Kenton Valley is a locality named for a valley located between Gumeracha and Lobethal, about 40 km (25 mi) east of Adelaide, South Australia. It is located in the Adelaide Hills Council local government area.

The area contains cherry and strawberry farms and a golf course. It is sparsely populated, and residents rely on nearby Gumeracha for educational and commercial services.

The town developed on a parcel of land taken up by the South Australian Company. The first manager of the station was William Beavis Randell who named a home he built, Kenton Park, after his home town in Devon.

The Kenton Valley Post Office operated from 1873 to 1973. The school operated from 1904 to 1943.

== See also ==
- List of valleys of Australia
