= Big Rocking Horse =

World's largest rocking horse

Coordinates: 34.820991°S 138.891842°E

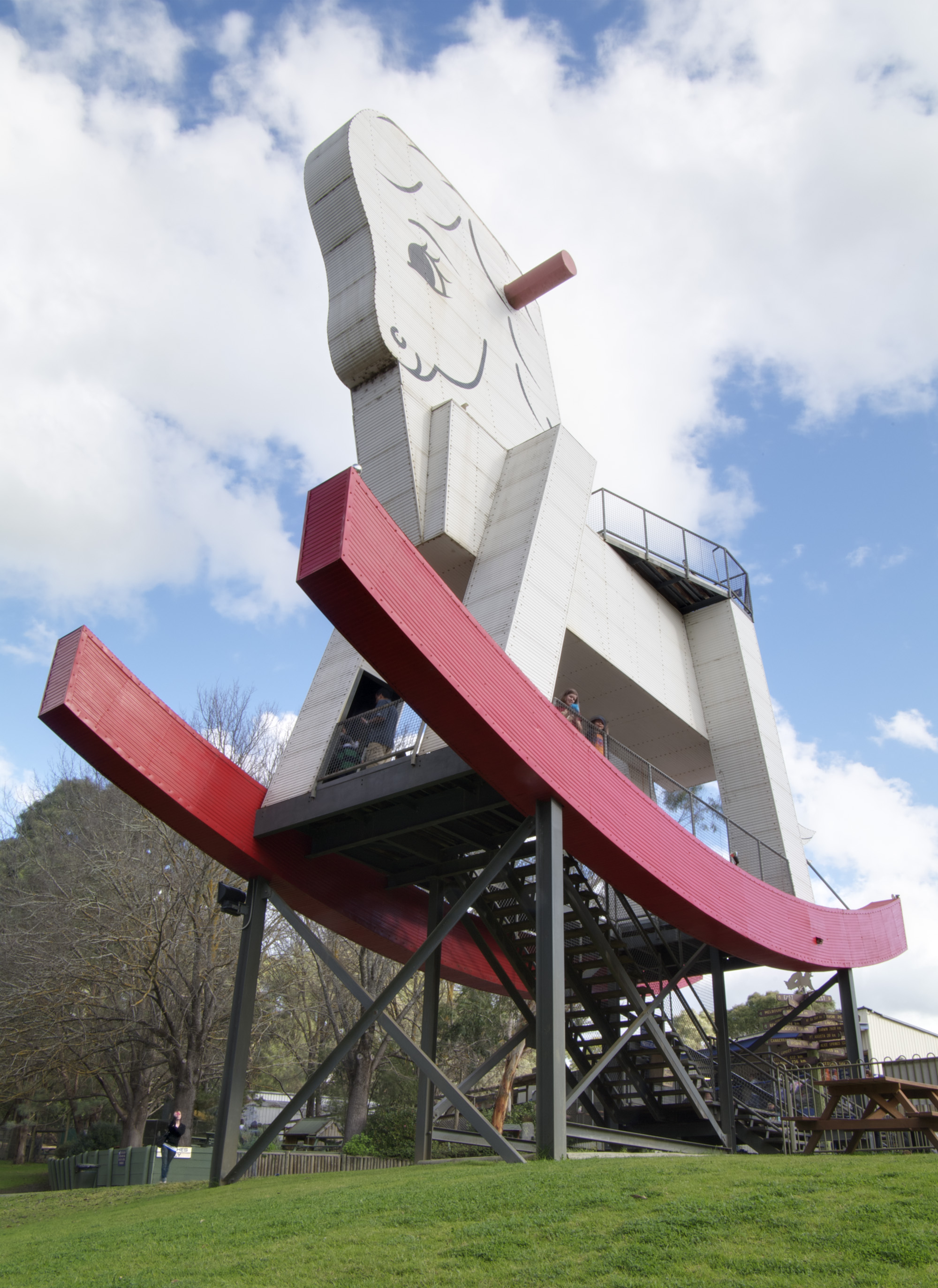
- Interactive map of the Big Rocking Horse area

General information
- Location: Gumeracha, South Australia
- Construction started: 1980
- Completed: 1981
- Opening: 1981
- Cost: A$$100,000
- Client: Wal Wilkinson
- Owner: Mell Penno

Height
- Height: 18.3 m (60 ft)

Dimensions
- Weight: 25 tonnes (25 long tons; 28 short tons)

Technical details
- Structural system: Steel
- Floor count: 3

Design and construction
- Architect: John Twopenny
- Civil engineer: Halwell Engineering

The Big Rocking Horse is a tourist attraction located in the town of Gumeracha, South Australia. Designed by David McIntosh, the structure weighs 25 tonnes, stands at over 18 metres (59 ft) tall, and is one of a number of Big Things in Australia designed to attract the attention of passing motorists. It is part of a larger complex that includes a wooden toy factory, wildlife park, and café. Owned by the Wilkinson family since the early 1970s, the complex was sold in 2023 and continues to operate today with new additions such as miniature golf.

== History ==
In 1973, after opening a wooden toy factory in Gumeracha, owner Wal Wilkinson chose to add a large roadside attraction to the site in order to attract passing traffic. The first of these was a large wooden giraffe which stood at approximately 5 m (16 ft) in height. This was subsequently replaced by a series of rocking horses: a 3 m (9.8 ft) tall horse giving way to a 5–metre model, before the process culminated in the decision to build the Big Rocking Horse. The resulting 18.3 m (60 ft) tall structure was designed by David McIntosh and John Twopenny, and it was opened in 1981 after eight months of construction and an investment of $100,000.

The Big Rocking Horse remained under Wilkinson family's ownership for just over 20 years, although problems arose late in this period with an increase in insurance premiums. Although it remained structurally sound, a fall in 1999 and the change in liability insurance premiums resulted in the closure of the site to the public in 2001. Prior to this date, visitors had been able to ascend to a lookout tower on the head of the structure.

In September 2003, Graeme Wilkinson placed the Toy Factory—including the Big Rocking Horse—on the market, at an asking price of approximately $900,000. It was sold in 2004 to Anthony Miller, who had emigrated from South Africa in 1999. Under Miller, the structure was restored and reopened to the public, with visitor access to the viewing platforms available from April 2004. Changes made by Miller, including the reopening of the Big Rocking Horse and the removal of entrance fees to the associated wildlife park, saw an overall increase in visitor numbers to the complex from 65,000 in 2003 to 200,000 in 2006.

In June 2009, the Big Rocking Horse was purchased by Frans and Lyn Gous, another family of business migrants from South Africa. They sold it in 2023 to Mell Penno, a local with a passion for the park.

== Design and construction ==
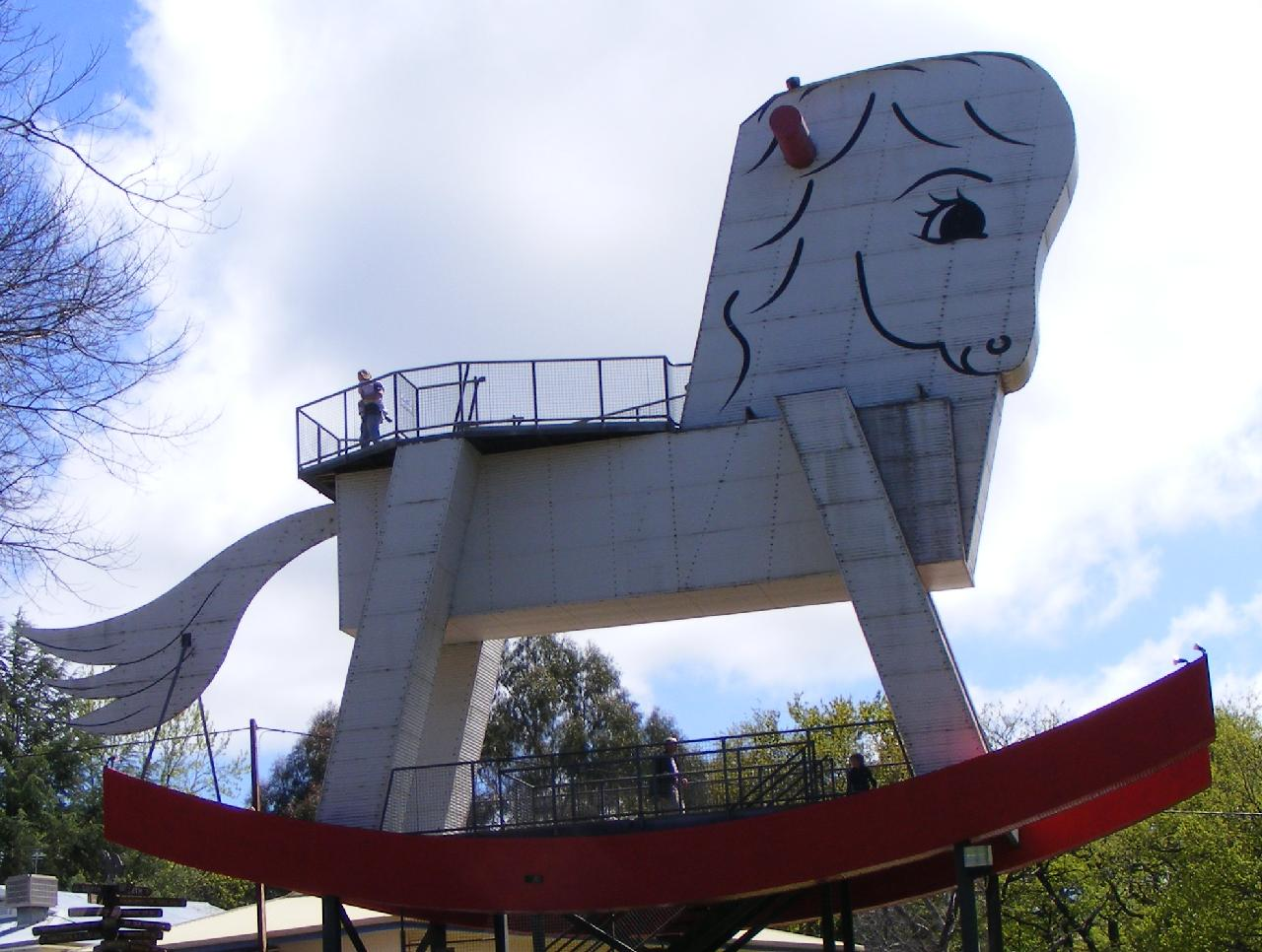
Another view of the giant rocking horse outside the toy factory

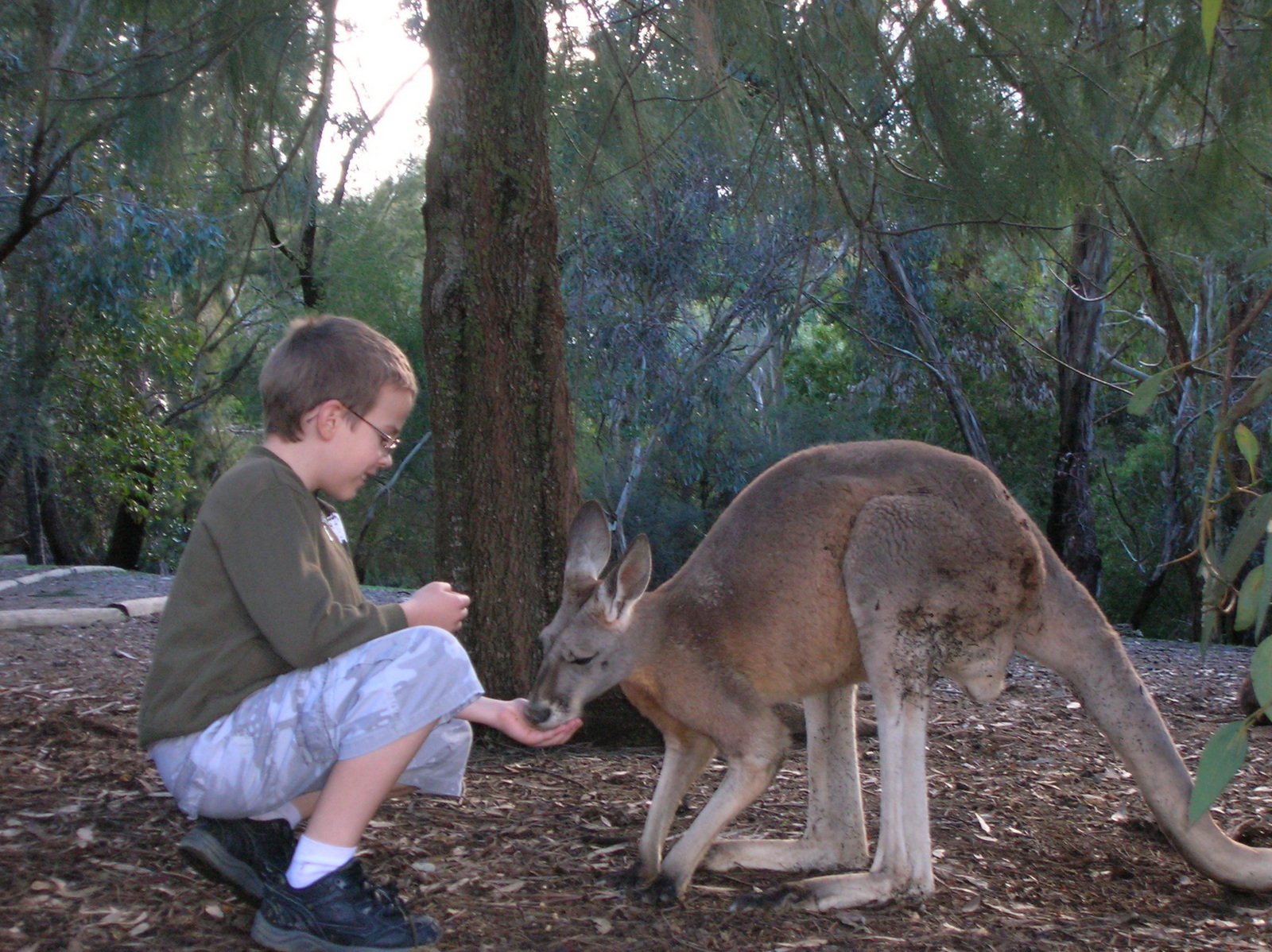
Feeding kangaroo at Gumeracha

The Big Rocking Horse 18.3 m (60 ft) in height and 17 m (56 ft) in length. The structure weighs 25 tonnes, and it is set in 80 tonnes of concrete to prevent rocking. The steel frame was fabricated by Halwell Engineering in Adelaide and transported by road to the site, after which the steel cladding was attached. Stairs inside the rocking horse lead to three viewing platforms: one at the head, one on the saddle, and a third on the "rocker bows" near the base of the structure.

The Big Rocking Horse is part of a larger complex incorporating the toy factory, a café and a wildlife park and now also miniature golf. The factory sells a large range of wooden toys and souvenirs, while the wildlife park (which covers approximately 7 acres (2.8 ha)), features a number of native and introduced species, including emus and kangaroos.

== In popular culture ==
The Big Rocking Horse features in the 2023 film Emotion Is Dead, written and directed by Pete Williams.
