= Adelaide Hills =

Coordinates: 34.911185°S 138.70735°E

- Region
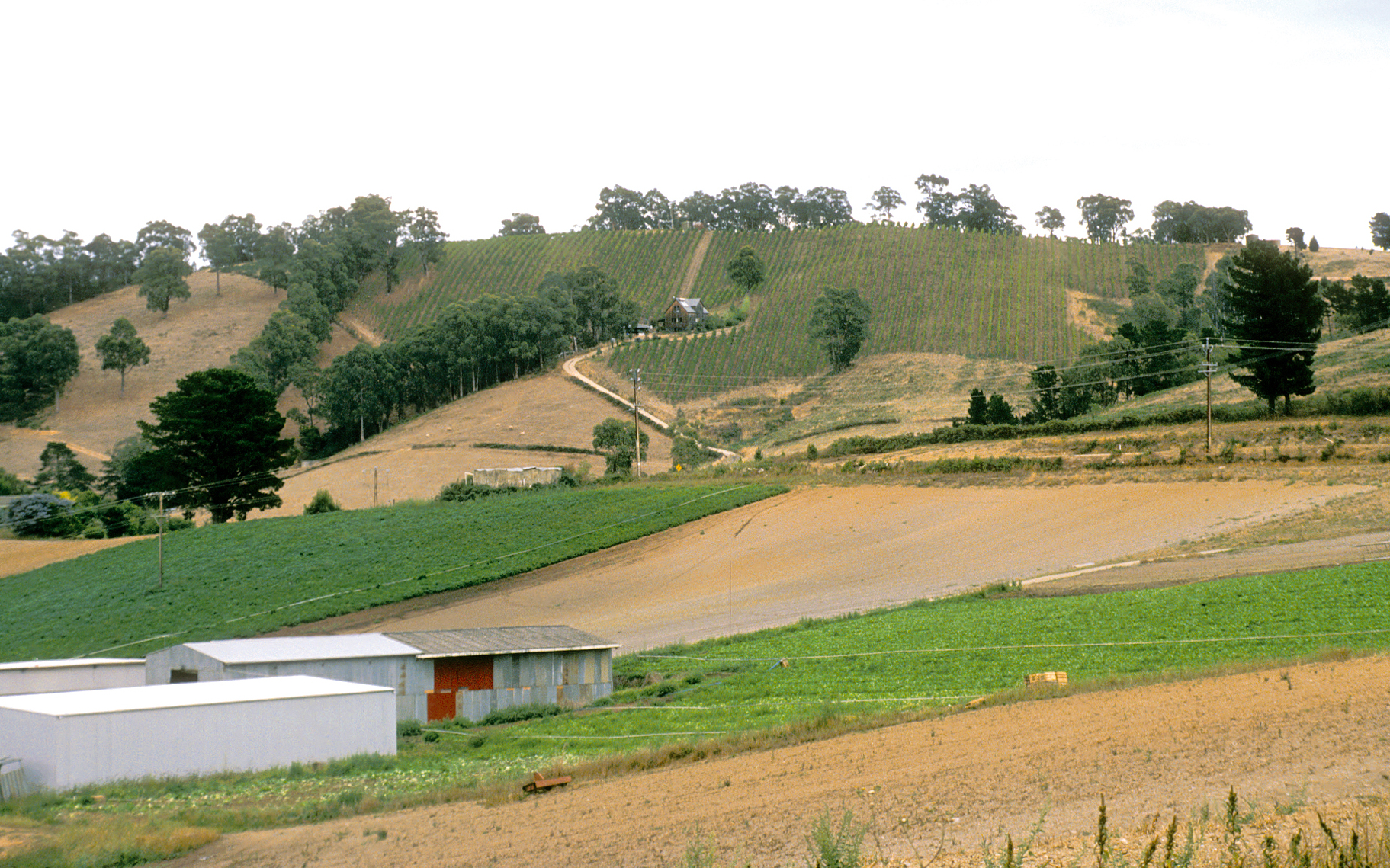
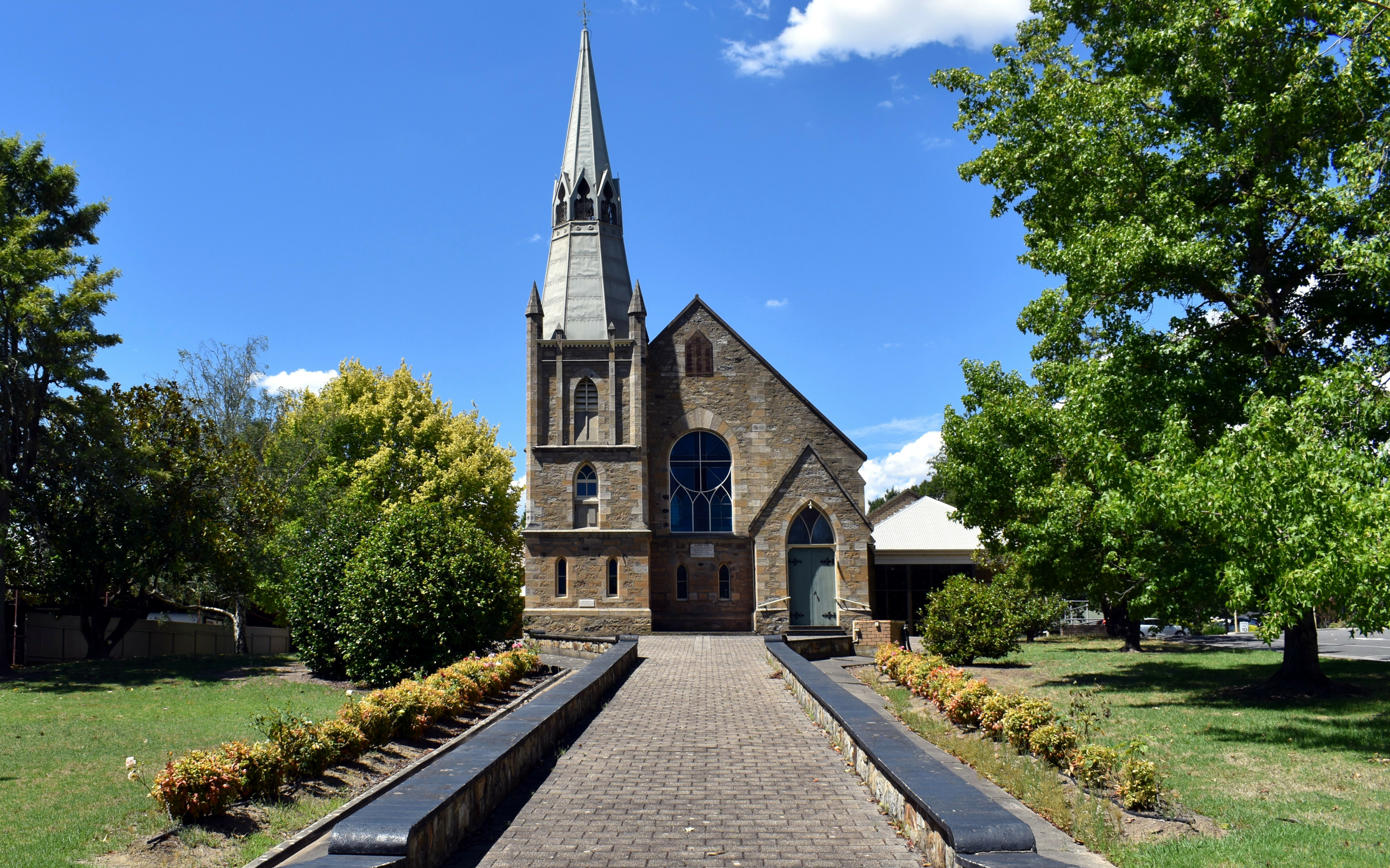
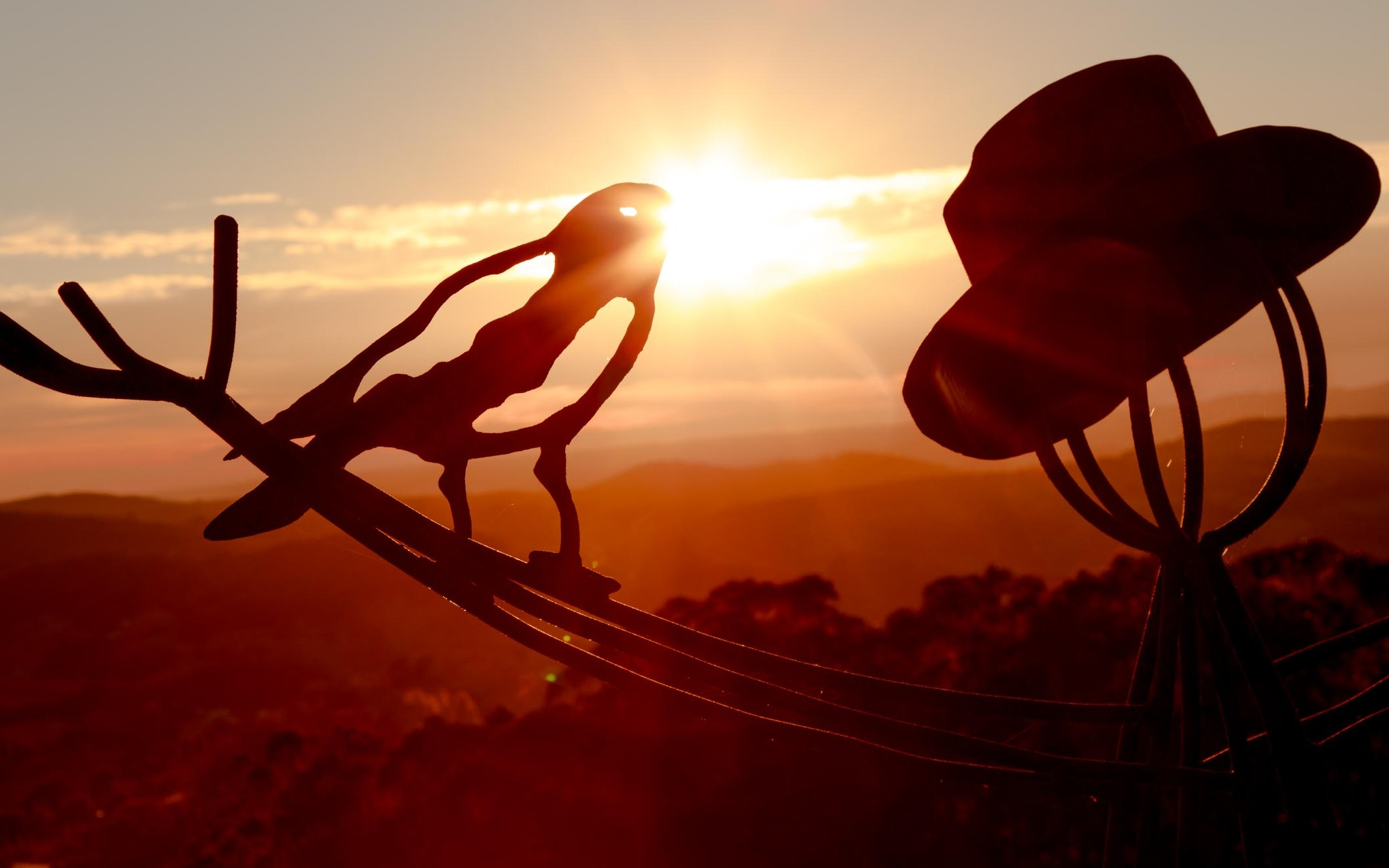
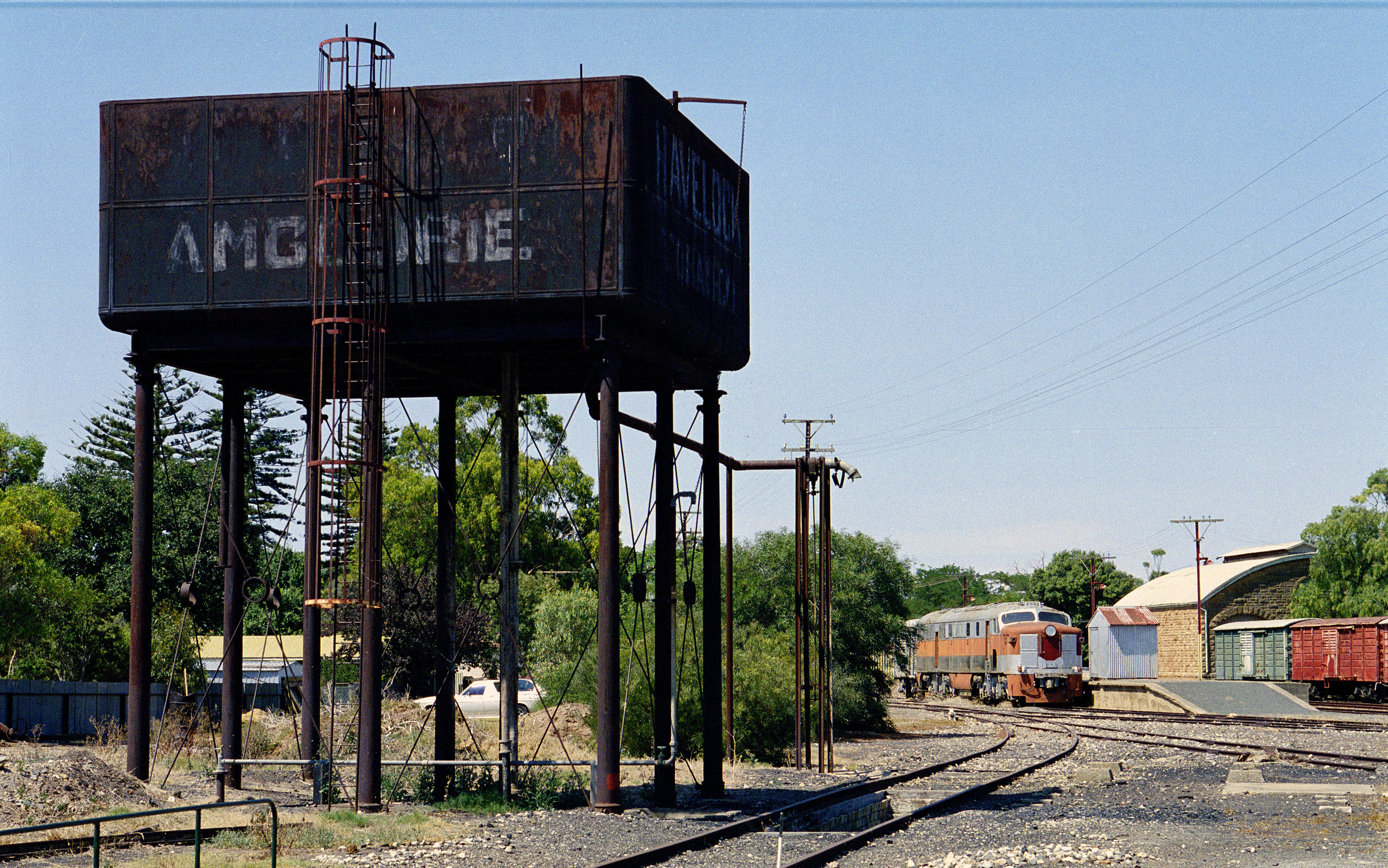
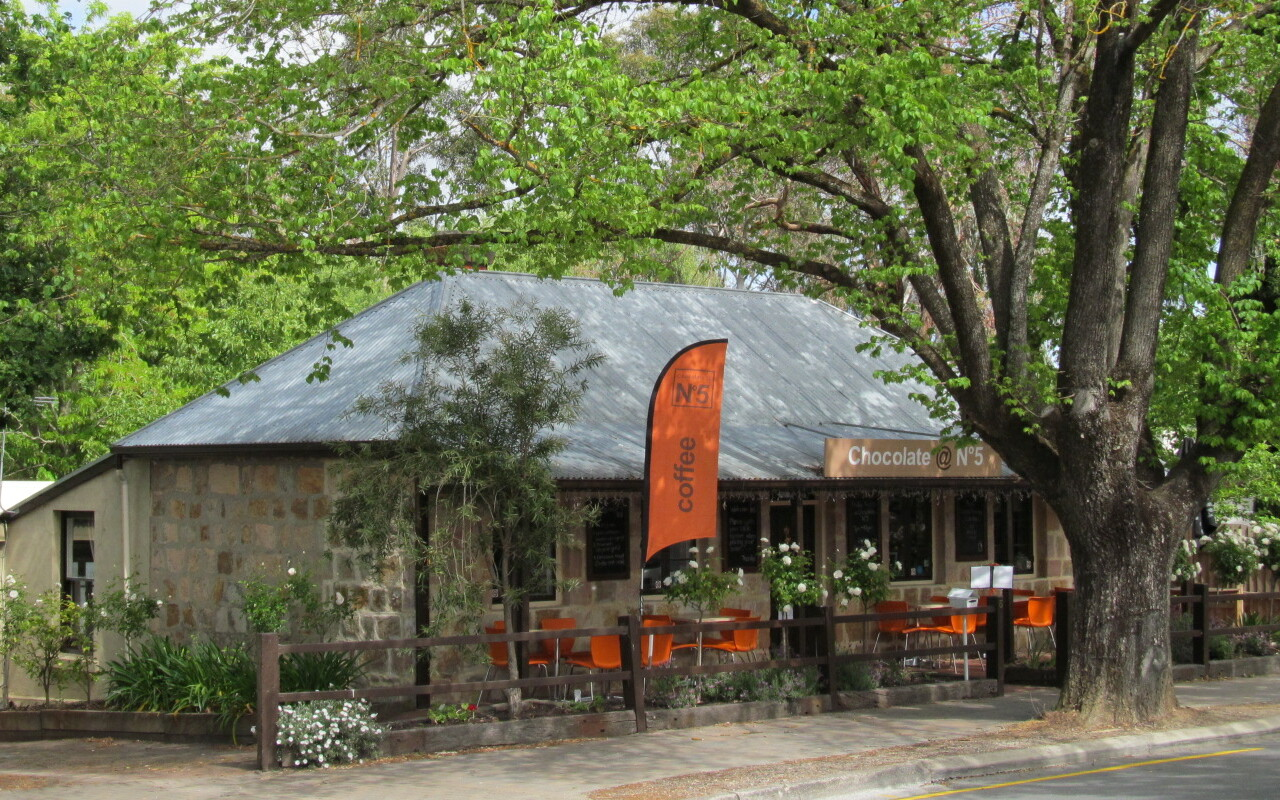
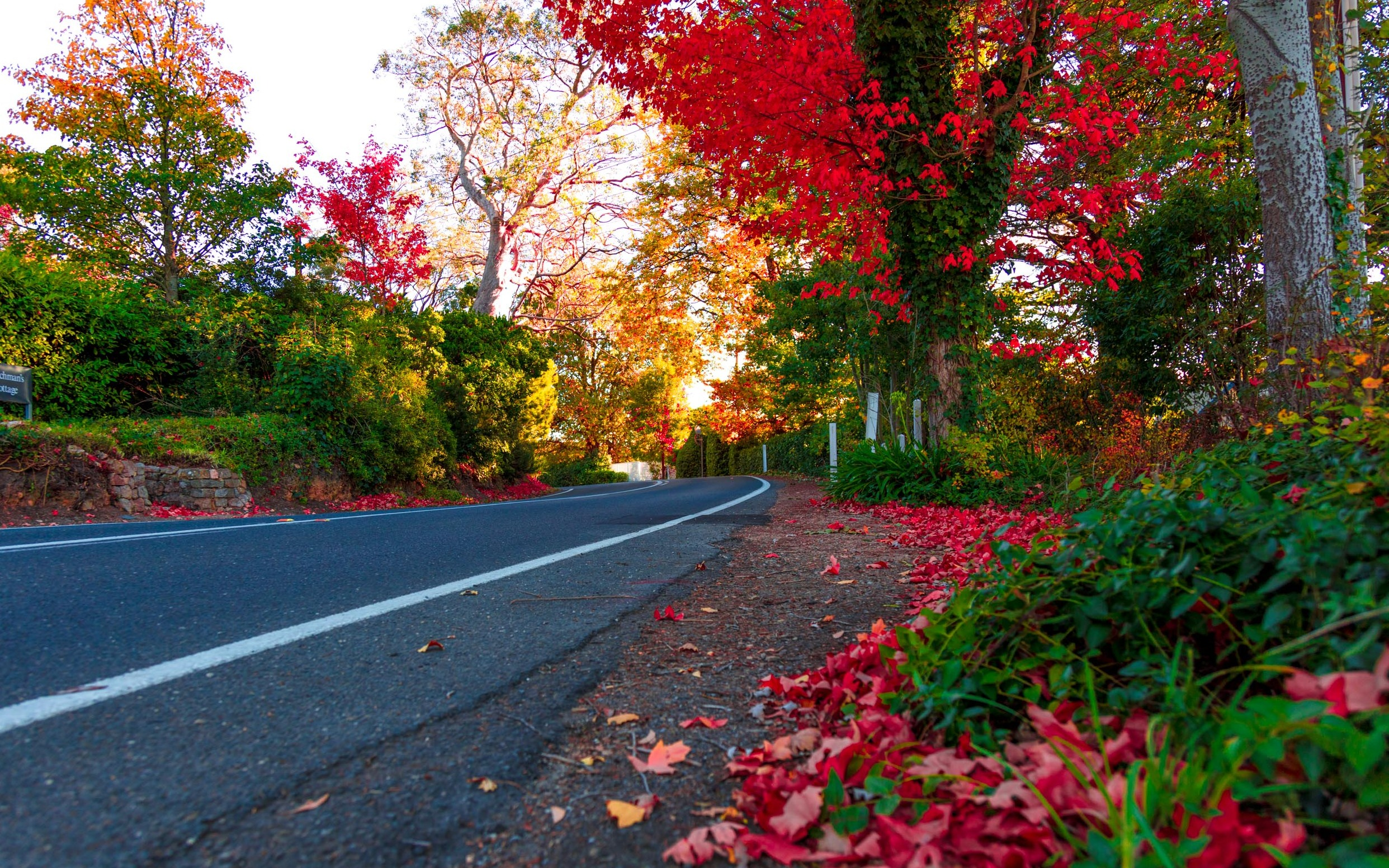
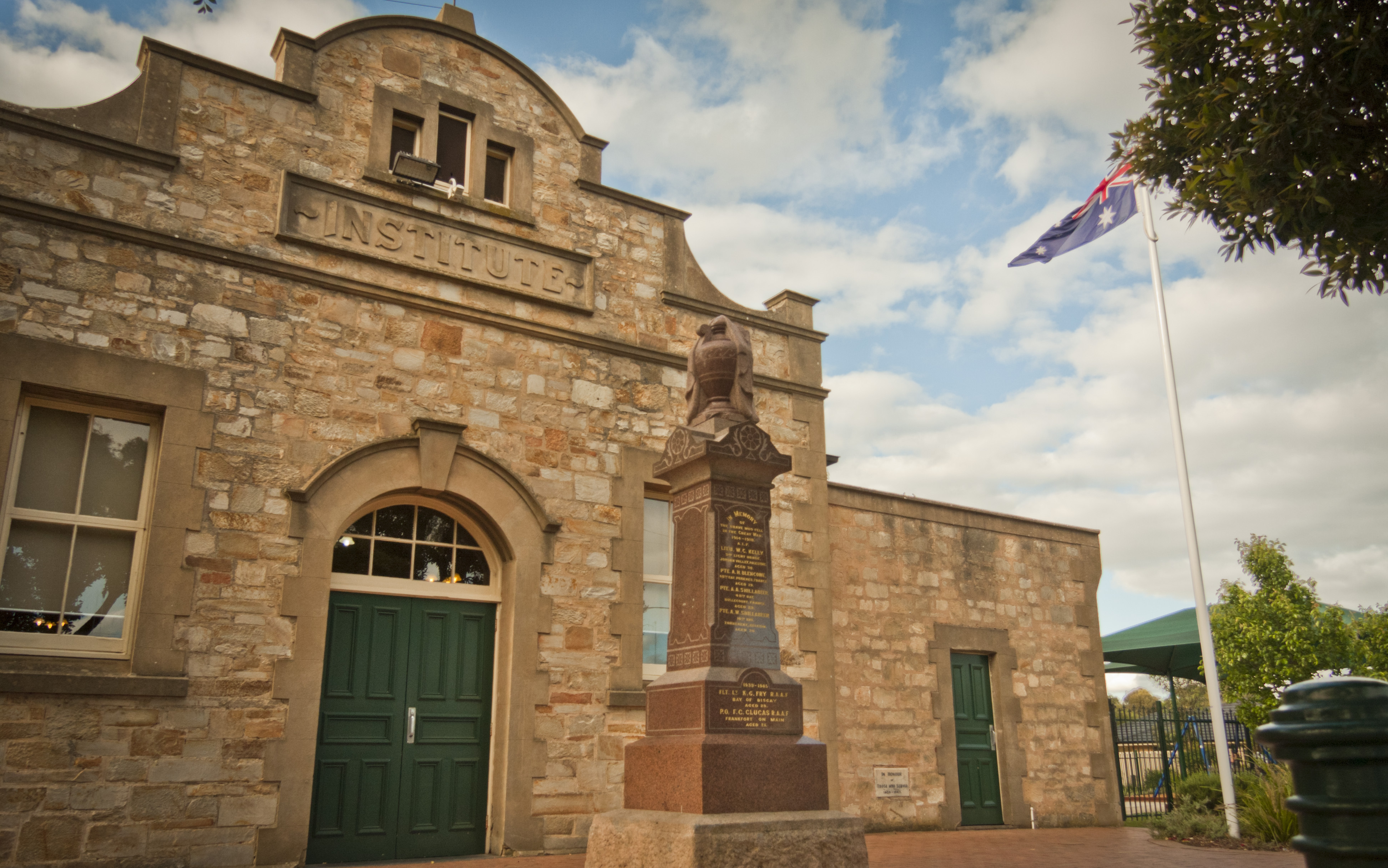
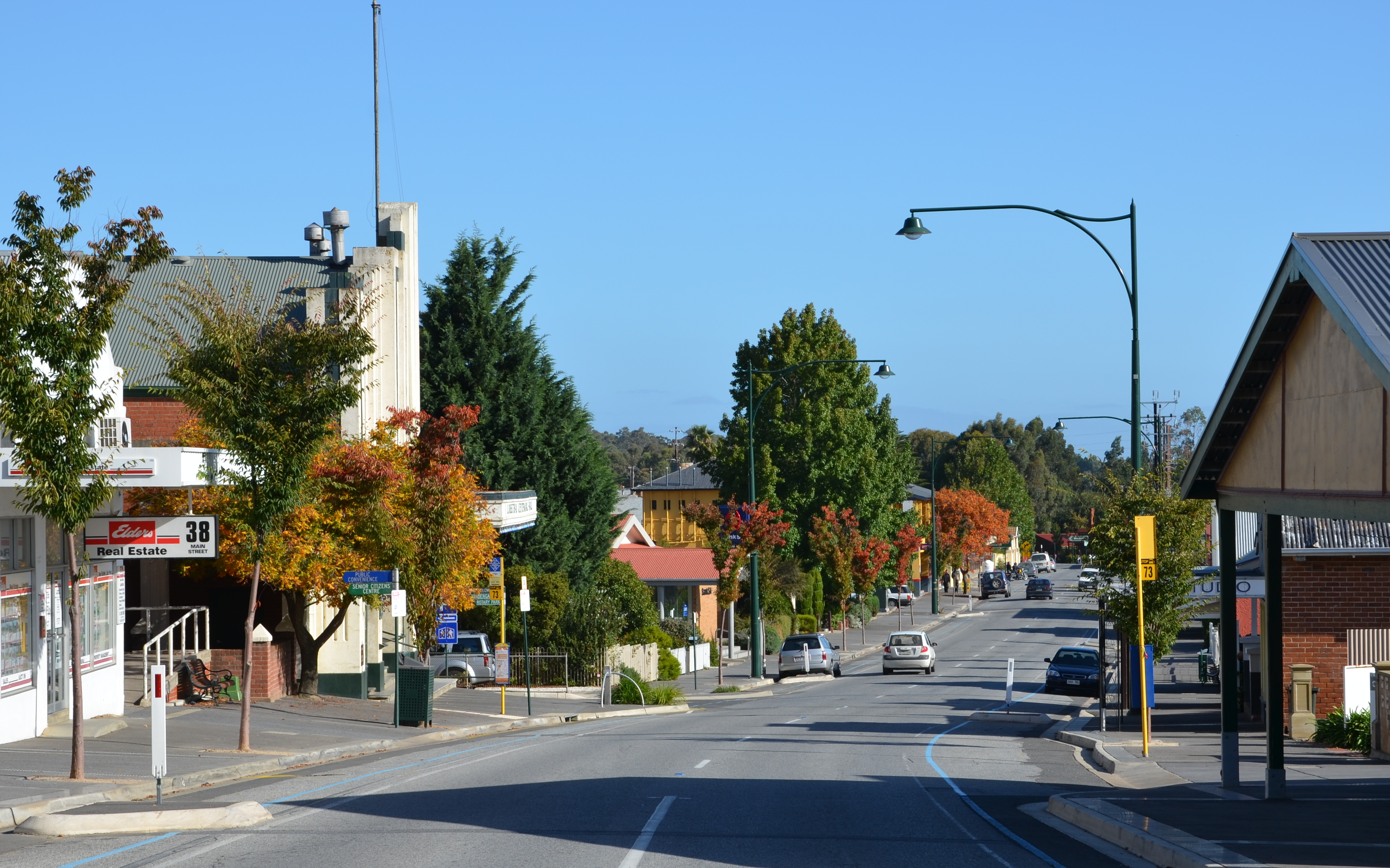
- From top to bottom, left to right: Vineyards in the Adelaide Hills wine region, St Paul's Lutheran Church, Hahndorf, scarecrow sculpture at Mount Lofty House, Strathalbyn railway station yard, German architecture at Hahndorf, autumn foliage at Mount Lofty, hall at One Tree Hill and the Main Street of Lobethal
- Country: Australia
- State: South Australia
- LGA: Adelaide Hills Council District Council of Mount Barker
- Established: Early 1800s

Government
  - State electorate: Kavel, Heysen, Morialta, Schubert
  - Federal divisions: Mayo; Barker; Sturt; Boothby, Kingston

Population
  - Total: 72,260 (2016 census)

The Adelaide Hills region is located in the southern Mount Lofty Ranges east of the city of Adelaide in the state of South Australia. The largest town in the area, Mount Barker, is one of Australia's fastest-growing towns. Before British colonisation of South Australia, the area was inhabited by the Peramangk people.

The Adelaide Hills wine region comprises areas of the Adelaide Hills above 300 m (980 ft).

== History ==
The 1921 painting Droving into the light by Hans Heysen, inspired by the Adelaide Hills landscape

Before European settlement, the Peramangk people occupied the Adelaide Hills region, including the land from the foothills, north from Mount Barker through Harrogate, Gumeracha, Mount Pleasant and Springton to the Angaston and Gawler districts in the Barossa Valley, and also southwards to Strathalbyn and Myponga on the Fleurieu Peninsula, as well as some sites on the River Murray to the east of the hills.

The Adelaide Hills were among the first areas of South Australia to be settled by European settlers. A number of towns in the Hills were started as German settlements; Hahndorf and Lobethal are two examples. The original town names and architecture still reflect this. Descendants of these first settlers and others of German origin still reside in the area.

Wood was harvested by woodsmen in the hills and carted to the city for building new buildings from the earliest days of the colony of South Australia. The hills were then named "the Tiers", and the timber merchants "tiersmen". The first pub in the East End of Adelaide, built at 233–237 Grenfell Street, was known as the Woodman (later being rebuilt as The Producers Hotel).

This explains the strong German cultural connection seen in the number of Lutheran churches, Lutheran schools which often have German on the curriculum, and the number of older residents who still speak German. Some customs have grown, such as the Lobethal Christmas lights which began in the 1950s.

Today, only one railway goes through the Adelaide Hills: the Adelaide to Melbourne railway line, which was first built in the 1870s and has had only some major realignments since (the most significant of which was the boring of a new tunnel at Sleeps Hill). Commuter passenger train services used to run from the city to the town of Bridgewater in the heart of the hills but were cut back to terminate at Belair in 1987.

== Culture and attractions ==
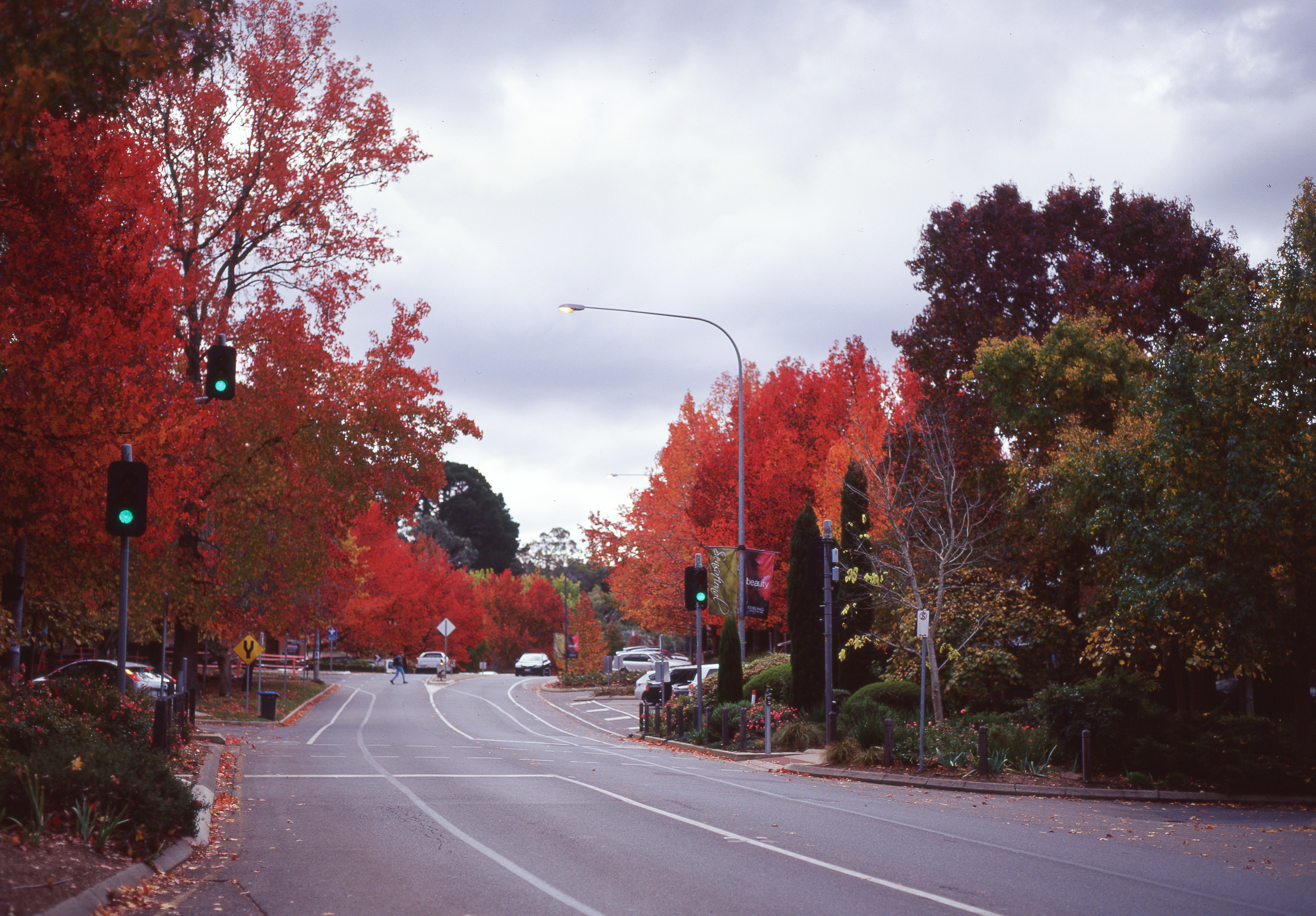
Autumn in Stirling

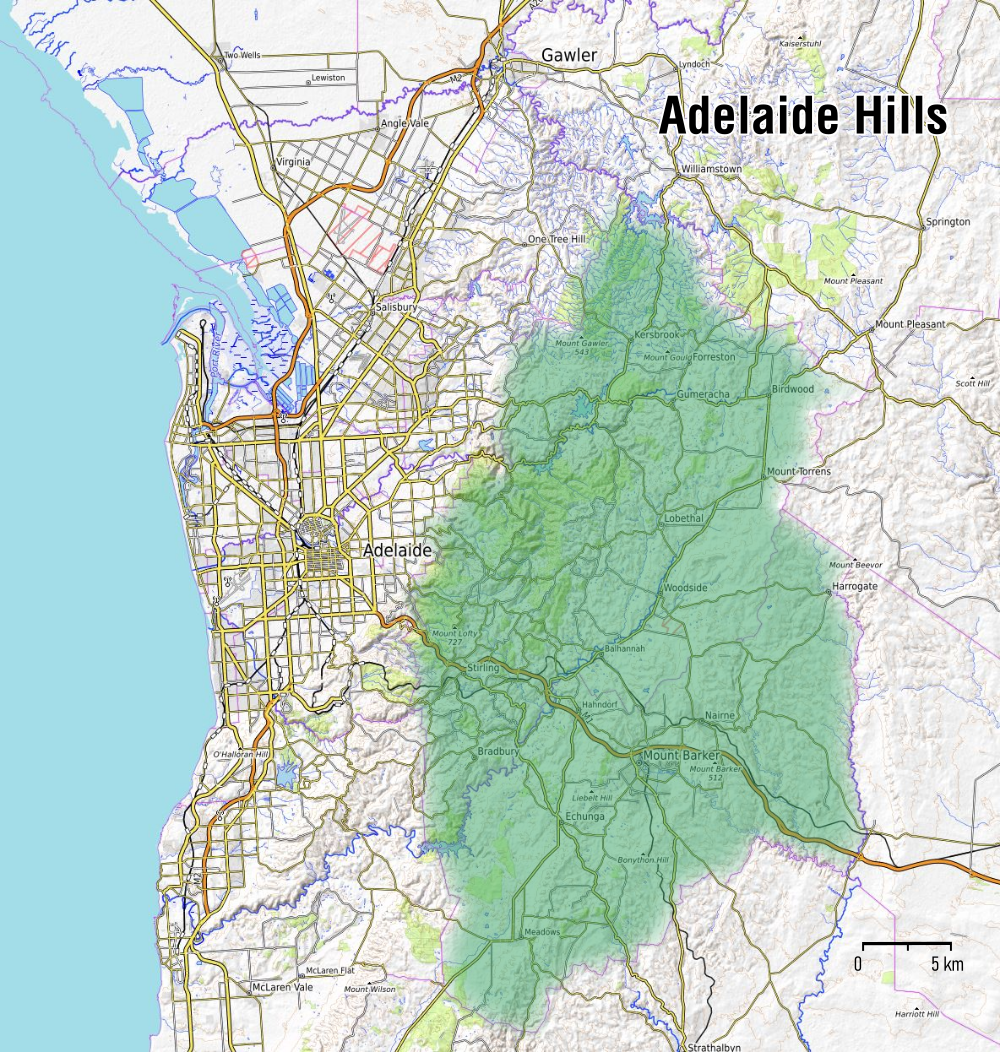
Map of Adelaide Hills

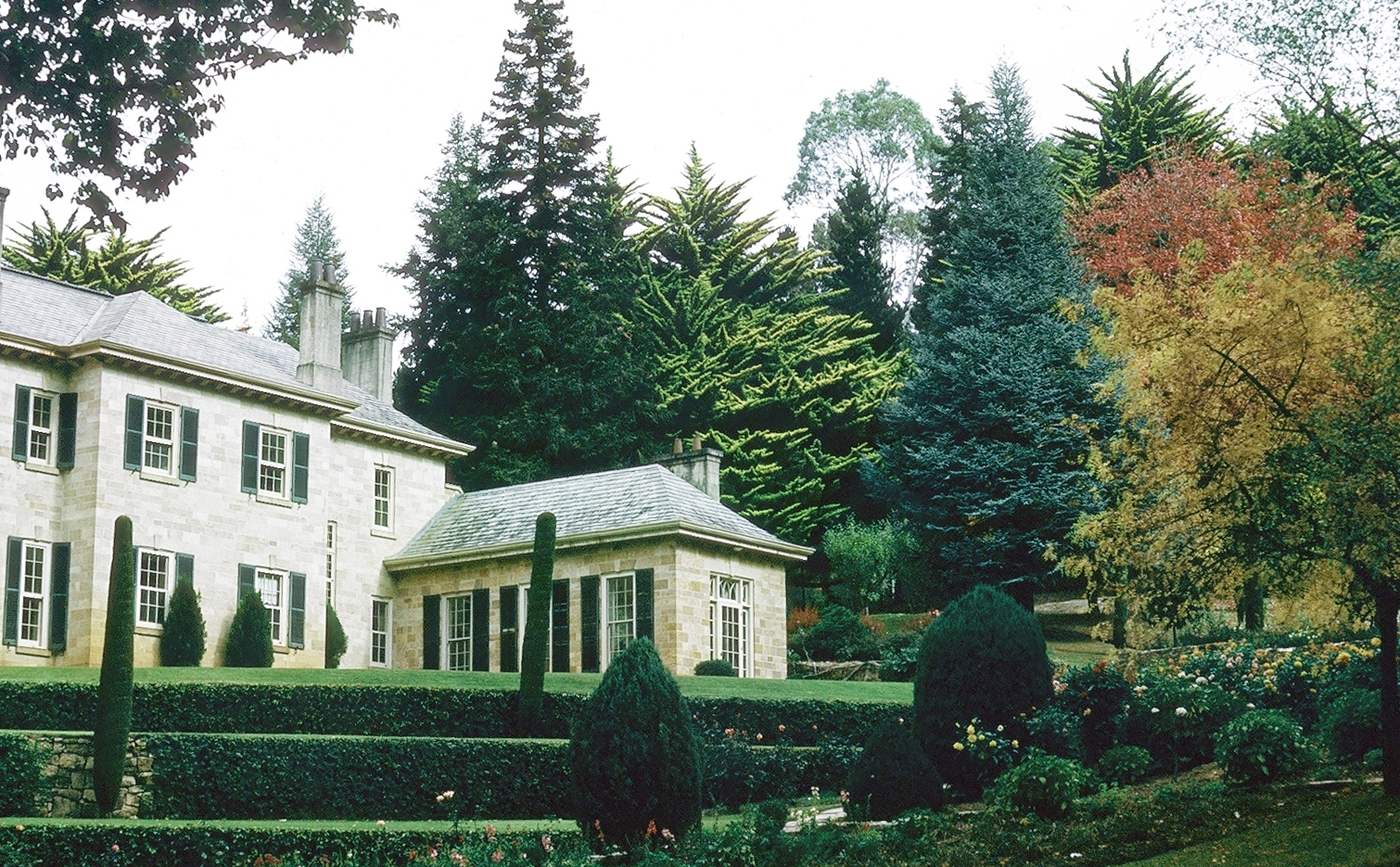
Raywood, Aldgate, formerly Arbury Park

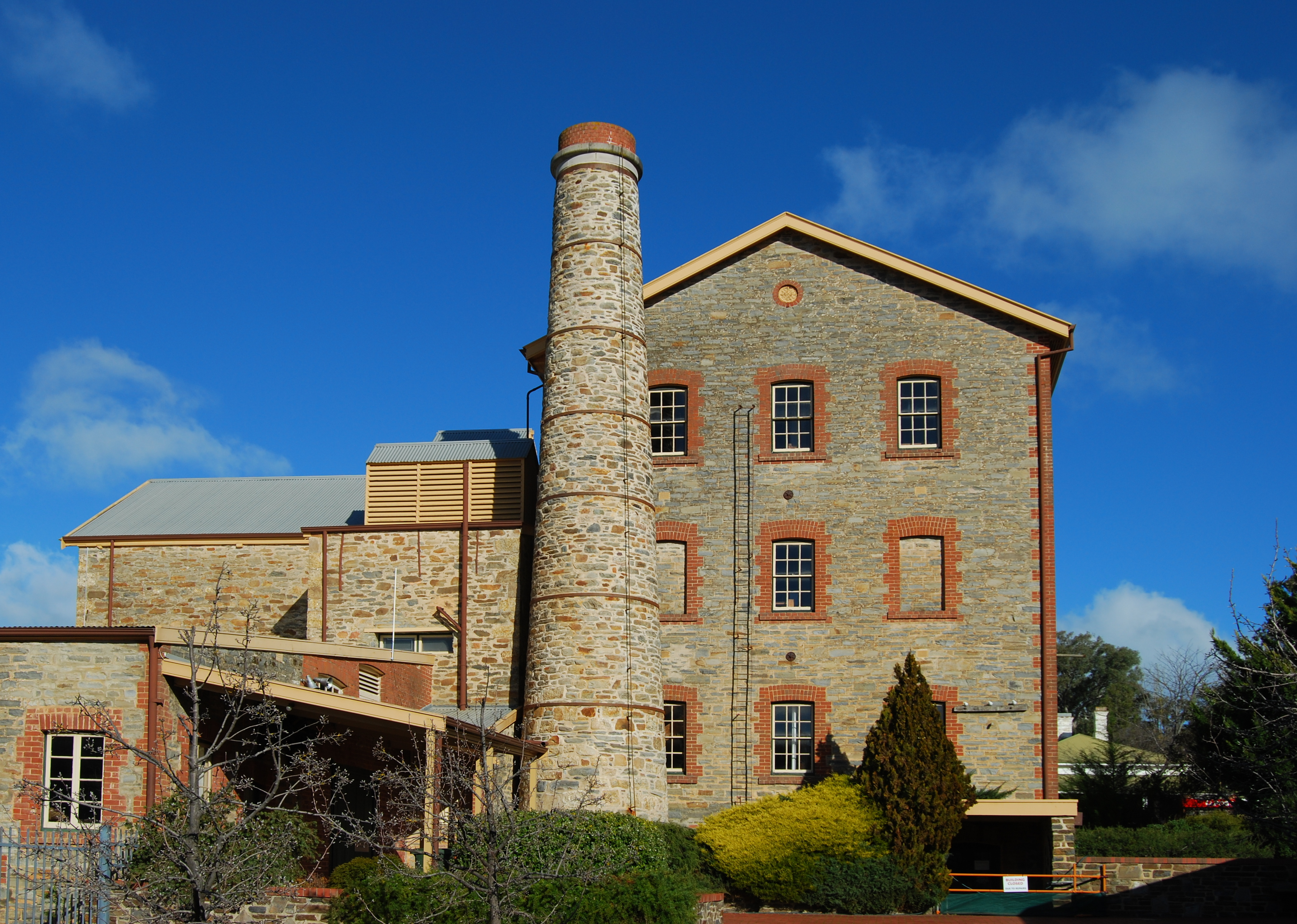
The old mill building at the National Motor Museum, Birdwood

For many Adelaide residents, a drive through the hills is a popular pastime, particularly due to proximity to the city and other suburbs. With Adelaide being a linear city extending 90 kilometres (56 mi) north to south, the hills are within 20 kilometres (12 mi) of the majority of residents.

The Adelaide Hills region is close enough to commute to the city, yet is the gateway to the country, so residents enjoy the best of both worlds – the country community life and the convenience of the city. Desirability of the area has increased, particularly since realignment of the road and construction of the Heysen Tunnels on the South Eastern Freeway improved road access. Rising real estate prices reflect this. The tunnels, completed in 1999, are named after Sir Hans Heysen, an eminent local landscape painter whose home and studio, "The Cedars", has been maintained as a cultural site located near Hahndorf. To this day, Hahndorf itself supports a thriving community of artists and craftspeople, either in the town or nearby countryside.

=== Wine region ===
The Adelaide Hills wine region includes all areas of the Hills above 300 m (980 ft). The elevation leads to cooler nights during the warm summer months, important for increasing the flavour of wines during the ripening season, and higher rainfall.

The Adelaide Hills region is one of the oldest wine region within Australia. The first vines were planted in the Hills at Echunga by John Barton Hack in 1839, three years after South Australia was declared a province, with the first wines produced in 1843.

=== Attractions ===
The Mount Lofty area, home to Adelaide's television transmission towers, has a lookout area, restaurant and the fire-spotting tower that used to be run by the Country Fire Service. It is also home to Mount Lofty Botanic Gardens.

Gumeracha is home to the largest rocking horse in the world, standing at 18.3 metres (60.0 ft) (approximately the height of a six-storey building) and open to the public, it serves to advertise an adjacent wooden toy factory and wildlife park.

The National Motor Museum is at Birdwood.

=== Events ===
The National Motor Museum is the endpoint of the "Bay to Birdwood" event, in which up to 5,000 motor vehicles are driven by their owners from Glenelg past the city and through the hills to finish at the museum, a distance of 70 km (43 mi), where a festival is held. There are two Bay to Birdwood events held on alternate years: the Run, held on even-numbered years, for vehicles manufactured up to 31 December 1959, while the Classic, held on odd-numbered years, is for vehicles manufactured between 1 January 1956 and 31 December 1986.

The Tour Down Under is a major annual sporting event, which makes use of some of South Australia's most popular cycling locations, including the Hills.

The area is home to the annual Medieval Fair held at Gumeracha across one weekend every April, and the English Ale Festival, also annually held each May. Highlights of the Medieval Fair include live jousting tournaments held on horseback, blacksmithing and dance demonstrations, needlework and costume creation, and authentic music provided by wandering troubadours. The genesis and popularity of these two colourful festivals, where patrons are encouraged to come in costume, springs from the relatively large numbers of British expatriates who reside in the Hills.

Throughout the year there are folk music sessions and concerts held in various small towns like Mt Pleasant, Mylor and Balhannah – connected with this same cultural community.

== Protected areas ==
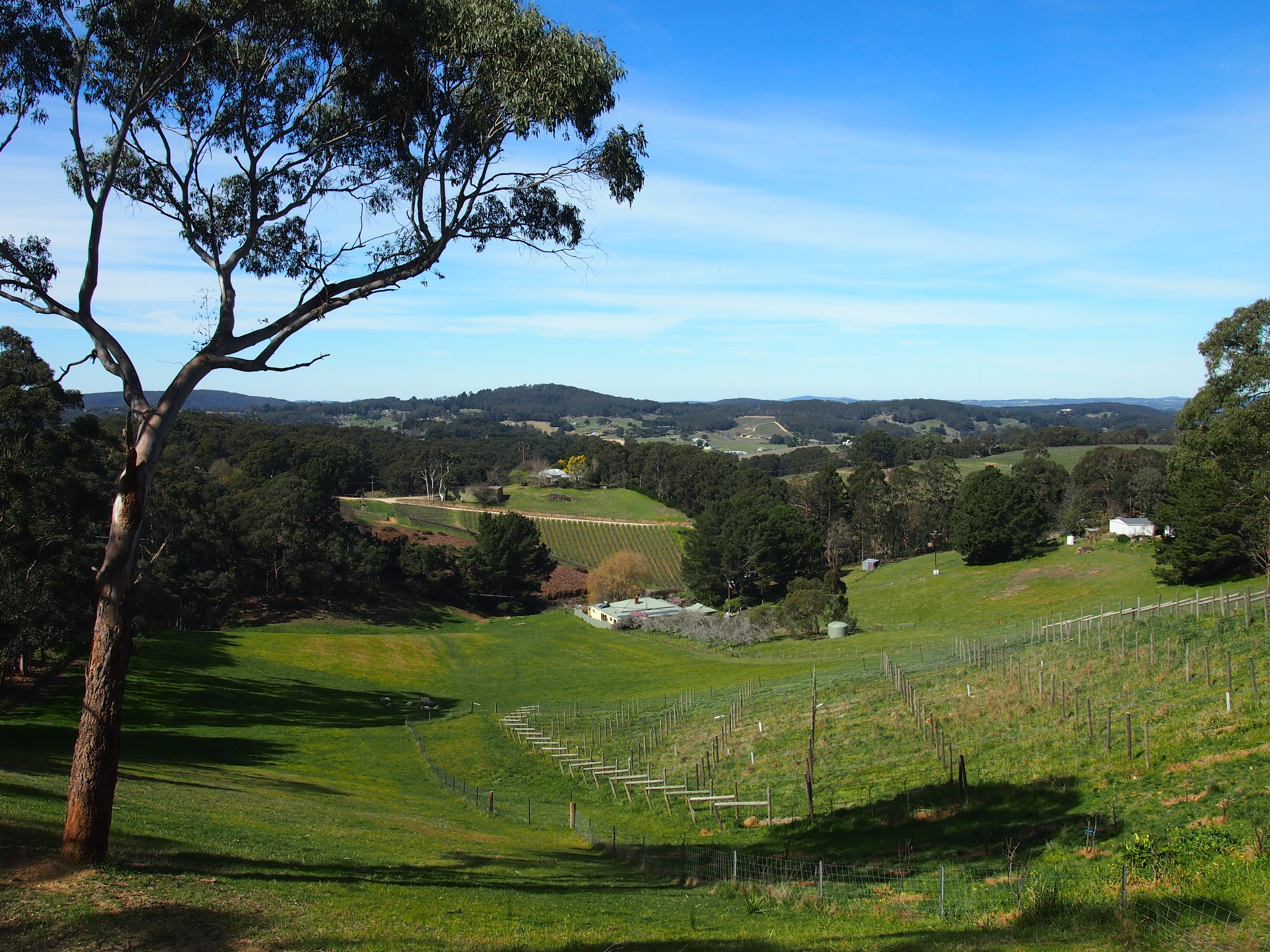
View SE across the Piccadilly Valley from the Mount Lofty Scenic Route; summit of Mount Barker, 22 kilometres (14 mi) away, on the horizon

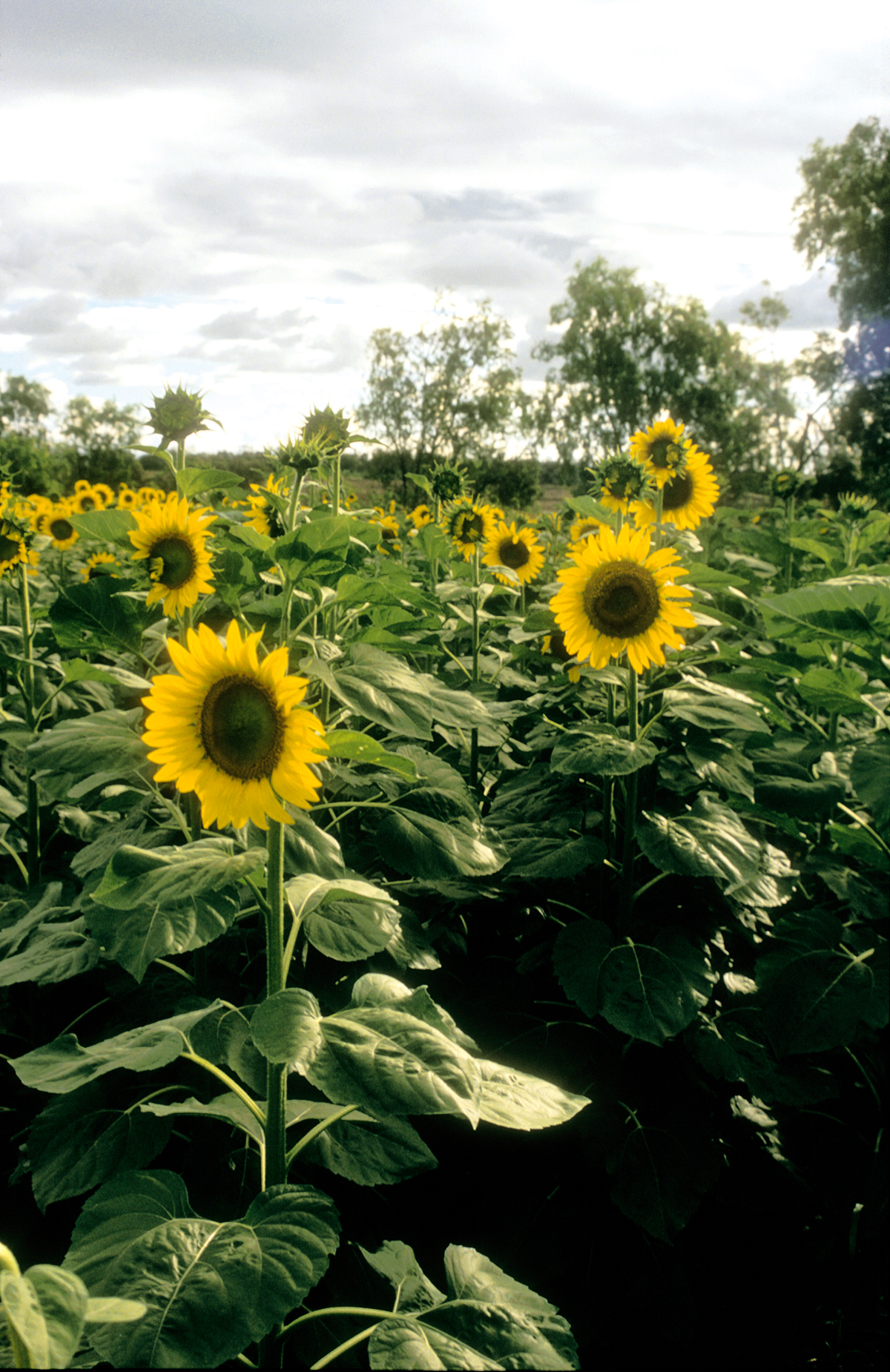
Sunflower crop in the Adelaide Hills

The Hills region includes the Cleland National Park, and within it the Cleland Wildlife Park with its free-roaming kangaroos, wallabies and emus. The park also has enclosed areas for dingos, koalas, native birds and snakes, and is a popular destination for school groups as well as interstate and international visitors.

Many native species of fauna can be encountered within the hills region. Among the more common species include the kookaburra, tawny frogmouth, southern brown bandicoot, kangaroo, brown tree frog, and bearded dragon. Several of the less common species include the antechinus (Morialta Conservation Park), heath monitor (Scott Creek Conservation Park) and the very rare inland carpet python (greater Mount Barker region).

Many walking trails, including a portion of the Heysen Trail and bike trails, including the start of the Mawson Trail abound within the Hills. The Heysen Trail itself extends from the tip of the Fleurieu Peninsula, through the Adelaide Hills and on up to the Flinders Ranges, three hours drive north of Adelaide. Birds found in the Hills include parrots such as the Adelaide rosella, rainbow and musk lorikeets as well as large cockatoos like the Major Mitchell, and the yellow-tailed black cockatoo. Smaller resident species include the superb blue wren and eastern spinebill.

== Facilities ==
=== Sport and recreation ===
Sporting and recreational activities are also popular in the hills region, with sports such as Australian rules football, cricket and soccer having very strong participation rates. The Basket Range Oval is home to the Basket Range Cricket Club.

=== Media ===
A small independent weekly newspaper, The Courier, is published in Mount Barker and serves many Hills towns. Founded in 1880, the paper has never missed a print run. It has been in the hands of the same family, the Marstons, since 1954, with a circulation of 7,500 as of May 2020, down from 15,000 in its heyday in the 1970s and 1980s.

== Climate ==
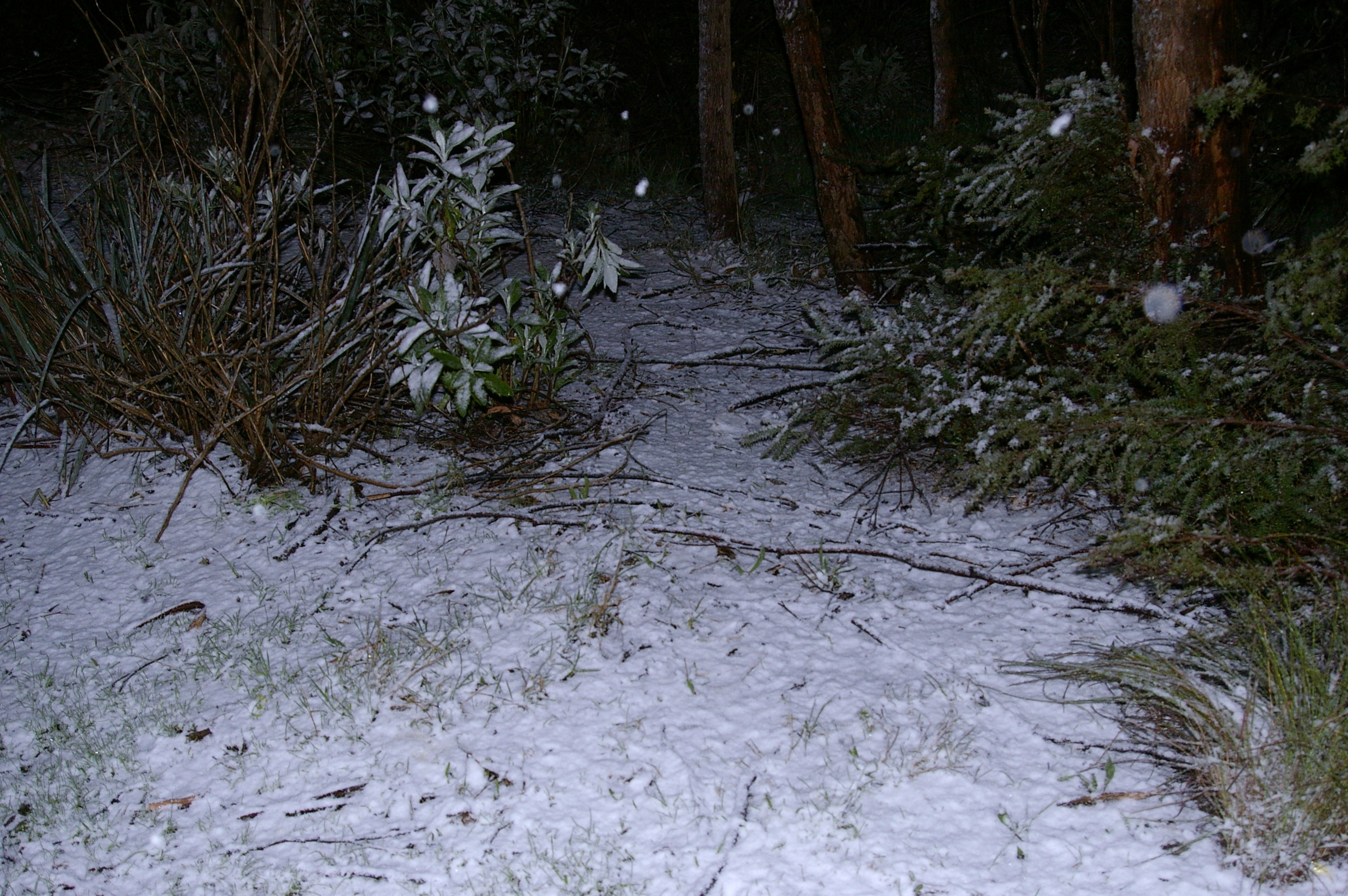
Snow on Mount Lofty

It is generally a few degrees cooler in the Hills than in Adelaide city centre and Plains. The days are warm in January and February, but the region generally experiences cool nights. This significant diurnal variation results in cool mean daily temperatures even in summer.

The area receives a light snowfall approximately once every three to four years, occasionally enough to stay on the ground for half a day, and large amounts of hail are more likely to fall here than on the Plains.

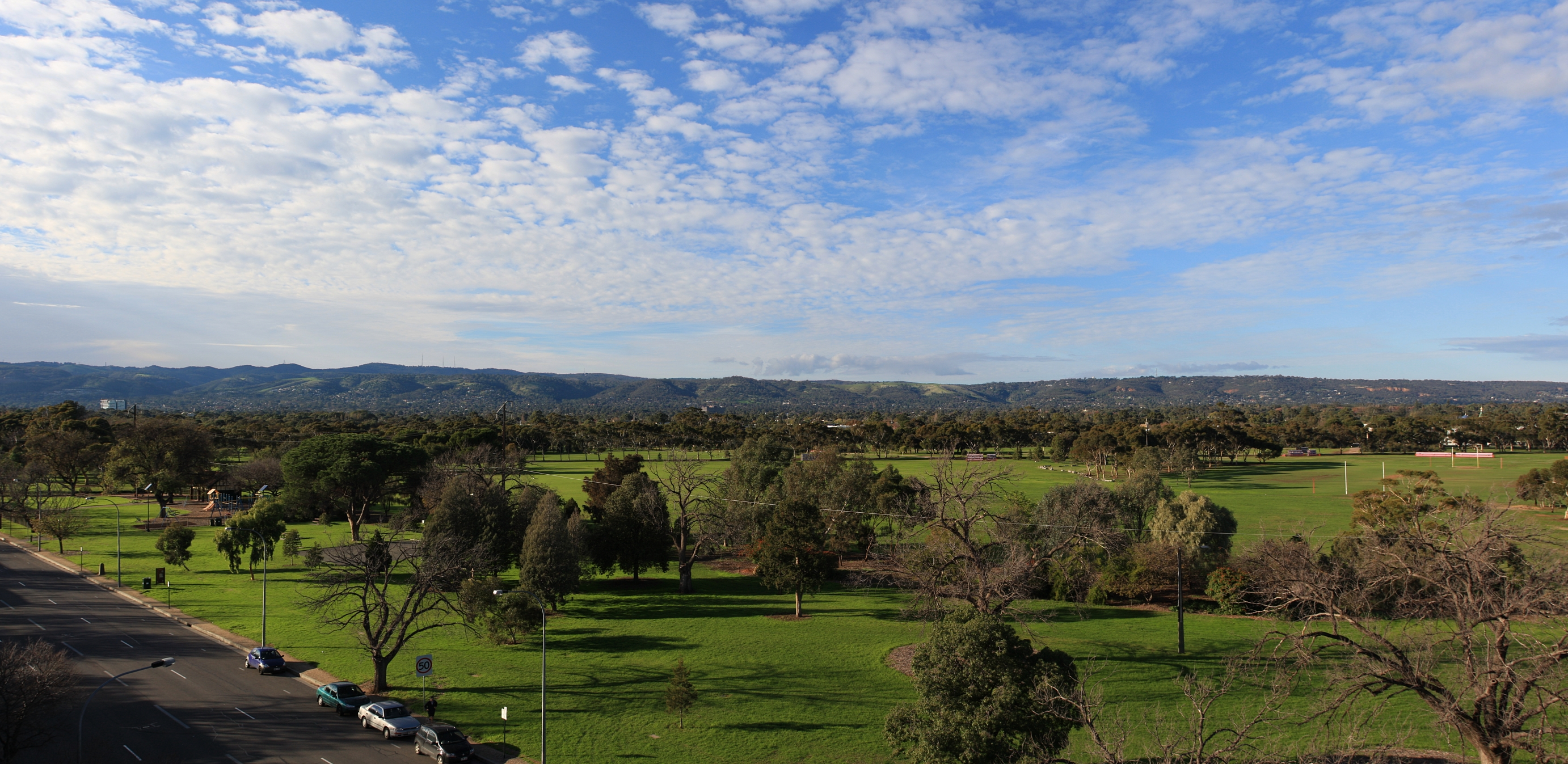
A view across the southern parklands to the Adelaide Hills from South Terrace, Adelaide

== See also ==
- List of towns in the Adelaide Hills
- South Australian food and drink
- South Australian wine
- Ecotourism
