= Mountadam Vineyards =

Coordinates: 34°40′02″S 139°01′17″E

- Location: Eden Valley, South Australia, Australia
- Wine region: Eden Valley wine region
- Founded: 1972
- Key people: David Wynn, Adam Wynn, David Brown
- Known for: Chardonnay
- Varietals: Chardonnay, Pinot noir, Merlot, Cabernet Sauvignon, Riesling
- Website: https://www.mountadam.com.au

Mountadam Vineyards is a winery established in 1972 and is located in Eden Valley, South Australia within the Barossa wine zone. The winery is particularly known for its Chardonnay wines.

== History ==
Mountadam was founded by David Wynn, who named the vineyard after his son, Adam. Wynn is credited with several milestones in winemaking, such as creating the wine cask, planting the first contour vineyard in Australia (Modbury) and being the first person to plant Riesling in Coonawarra. In 1993, Wynn received the Maurice O'Shea Award – one of the highest honors an Australian winemaker can be awarded.

Wynn chose to plant his vineyard at the highest point in the Eden Valley, thus naming the region High Eden. The cool climate and windy conditions, to go with later harvesting times, made for challenging winemaking in the region. At 550 metres above sea level, Mountadam is among the highest elevated vineyards in South Australia. In 1984, Wynn's son, Adam, took over winemaking at the vineyard. In 2000, Adam sold the winery to Louis Vuitton Moet Hennessy (LVMH). In 2006, ownership of the winery was, once again, privatized when it was purchased by David Brown, an accountant and farmer from South Australia. During the period in which LVMH owned the winery, the brand fell out of favor with consumers. Brown, along with winemaker Con Moshos, have worked to restore the reputation the Mountadam brand once had.

== Label design ==
When David Wynn bought Mountadam he took his artist friend Tate Adams to look over the property and come up with a design for the wine label. While walking on the property, two eagles were circling and Wynn told Adams that they were nesting on a tree on the property. Adams designed and made two wood engravings incorporating the eagle, one design for the bottles and one for the boxes, the designs still in use today.

== See also ==
- South Australian food and drink
- List of wineries in the Eden Valley
- Tate Adams
