= Pewsey Vale =

Winery in South Australia

Coordinates: 34°34′20″S 139°05′10″E

- Location: Eden Valley, South Australia, Australia
- Wine region: Eden Valley wine region
- Founded: 1961
- Key people: Joseph Gilbert, Geoffrey Angas Parsons, Wyndham Hill-Smith
- Cases/yr: 25,000 cases
- Known for: Contours Riesling
- Varietal: Riesling
- Website: www.pewseyvale.com

Pewsey Vale vineyard was founded in Eden Valley, South Australia during 1847 by Englishman, Joseph Gilbert. It is currently part of S.Smith and son. It was the first vineyard established in what is now the Eden Valley wine region and the first to plant Riesling vines in Australia. Pewsey Vale has become one of Australia’s leading producers of commercial riesling, with its signature wine being the Contours Riesling.

== History ==
In 1839, Joseph Gilbert arrived in Australia after he had decided to leave his home in the Vale of Pewsey in Wiltshire. Prior to his arrival, Gilbert had read in The Times that the ship, The Buckinghamshire, would be leaving for Australia. He had made the decision to leave his home after this news and wasted no time purchasing land after he arrived in Australia, buying 15,000 acres in the Barossa Valley.

In 1841, two years after his purchase of the land in Barossa Valley, he bought more land in the Eden Valley. This particular area was at an altitude of approximately 500 meters above sea level. At this altitude, the cooler temperatures were crucial to the eventual success of the winery, as cold would allow for the grapes to undergo longer periods of ripening.

At the age of 38, Gilbert had built a home on the Eden Valley property and began to plant his first grapevines, but they were of the table grape variety. It was not until 1847 when Gilbert started to plant grapes for the purpose of winemaking, hence establishing Eden Valley’s first winery. During the initial stages of his efforts, Gilbert was known to tinker with his approach to winemaking. His findings during this time were crucial to the wine industry in the Eden Valley. Gilbert was also known to take some of his cuttings and distribute them to others in the region who were interested in starting their own vineyard.

Despite the fact that the vineyard was established over 160 years ago, it has not been in operation for that entire duration. Economic issues during the Great Depression in the 1920s caused the Pewsey Vale winery to go downhill, which eventually led to a long period of abandonment. It was not until 1961, when Geoffrey Angas Parsons, the owner of Pewsey Vale at the time, found out that his property was home to the region's first vineyard. Parsons and his friend, Wyndham Hill-Smith, discussed the idea of restoring the property. At the time, several wineries were looking at potential sites with cooler ripening conditions than those found in the Barossa Valley. Intrigued, Parsons and Hill Smith began to restore the vineyard and planted 56 hectares of riesling and cabernet sauvignon. It was at this time that the modern Pewsey Vale winery was founded.

== Riesling and the Stelvin Cap ==
The Pewsey Vale Riesling became recognized in 1969 after winning a number of awards, and to this day, the Contour Riesling is thought to be the signature wine produced by the winery.

Starting in 1977, Pewsey Vale became the first winery to use the Stelvin screw cap to seal their bottles of wine. The Stelvin proved to be a much better method of sealing the wine than the previously used Stelcap The new closure eliminated the possibility of wine taint from cork. In addition, the seal would not allow any air into the bottle, thus ensuring the wine would undergo a slower aging process.

Despite the fact that the Australian wine industry was interested in the idea of sealing wines with the Stelvin screw-cap, consumers did not agree. Because consumers saw the use of a metallic cap as an indication of an inferior product, the winery stopped using the Stelvin screw-cap in 1984. Pewsey Vale never fully gave up on the idea, and reintroduced the Stelvin in 1995 for their riesling wines intended for museum use. In 2000, current winemaker Louisa Rosa was quoted as saying: Pewsey Vale Rieslings are renowned for their exceptional aging ability. While Australian wine consumers may not be quite ready to go back to Pewsey Vale in Stelvin, at least we can rest assured that the aging potential of these (museum) wines will be maximised.

From 2003, it was decided that all Pewsey Vale Rieslings would be released with the Stelvin screw-cap.

== See also ==
- South Australian food and drink
- List of wineries in the Eden Valley
