= Barossa Valley Way =

Highway in South Australia

Barossa Valley Way South Australia
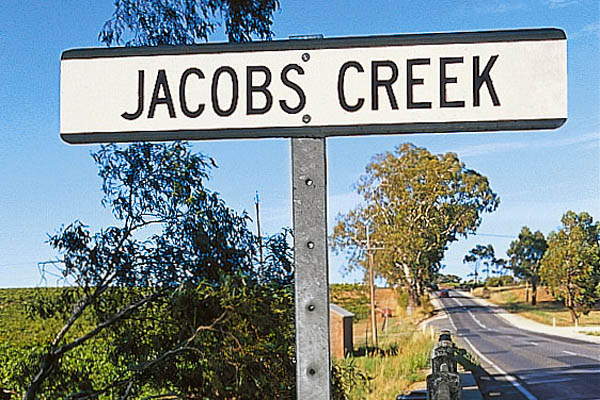
- Famous sign at Jacobs Creek crossing near Rowland Flat on the Barossa Valley Way
- Coordinates: 34.597200°S 138.749103°E (West end); 34.456454°S 139.002619°E (East end)

General information
- Type: Road
- Length: 34 km (21 mi)
- Route number(s): B19 (1998–present)

Major junctions
- West end: Main North Road; Gawler, South Australia
- Angaston Road
- East end: Sturt Highway; Nuriootpa, South Australia

Location(s)
- Region: Barossa Light and Lower North
- Major suburbs: Lyndoch, Rowland Flat, Tanunda

Barossa Valley Way is the main road linking most of the major towns of the Barossa Valley in South Australia, designated as route B19 for its entire length. It is 35 km long, roughly following the North Para River.

== Route ==
Barossa Valley Way starts in the centre of Gawler and heads east, passing through Sandy Creek, Lyndoch, Rowland Flat, Tanunda and Nuriootpa, where it crosses the North Para River and meets Sturt Highway. The route is predominantly on the valley floor, with wineries and vineyards on both sides of the road, with views of the rising ground including the Barossa Ranges.

== History ==
Barossa Valley Way follows a previous alignment of the Sturt Highway, which used to pass through the towns of Gawler, Lyndoch, Tanunda and Nuriootpa instead of where it now passes around the west and north of Gawler and the Barossa Valley.

== Major intersections ==
LGA	Location	km	mi	Destinations	Notes
Gawler	Gawler	0.0	0.0	Murray Street (B19 south, unallocated north) – Giles Corner, Gawler Belt, Elizabeth, Gepps Cross	Western terminus of road; route B19 continues south on Murray Street
Barossa	Sandy Creek	7.3	4.5	Williamstown Road – Williamstown	
Barossa	Lyndoch	14.1	8.8	Lyndoch Valley Road (B31) – Williamstown	
Barossa	Tanunda	25.1	15.6	Gomersal Road – Shea-Oak Log, Roseworthy	
Barossa	Nuriootpa	32.6	20.3	Railway Terrace (B10) – Angaston, Mount Pleasant	
Light	Nuriootpa	35.2	21.9	Sturt Highway (A20) – Gawler, Truro, Blanchetown	Eastern terminus of road and route B19
1.000 mi = 1.609 km; 1.000 km = 0.621 mi: Route transition

== See also ==
- Highways in Australia
- List of highways in South Australia
- Barossa Valley (wine)
