= Black Hill, South Australia =

Black Hill
- Town
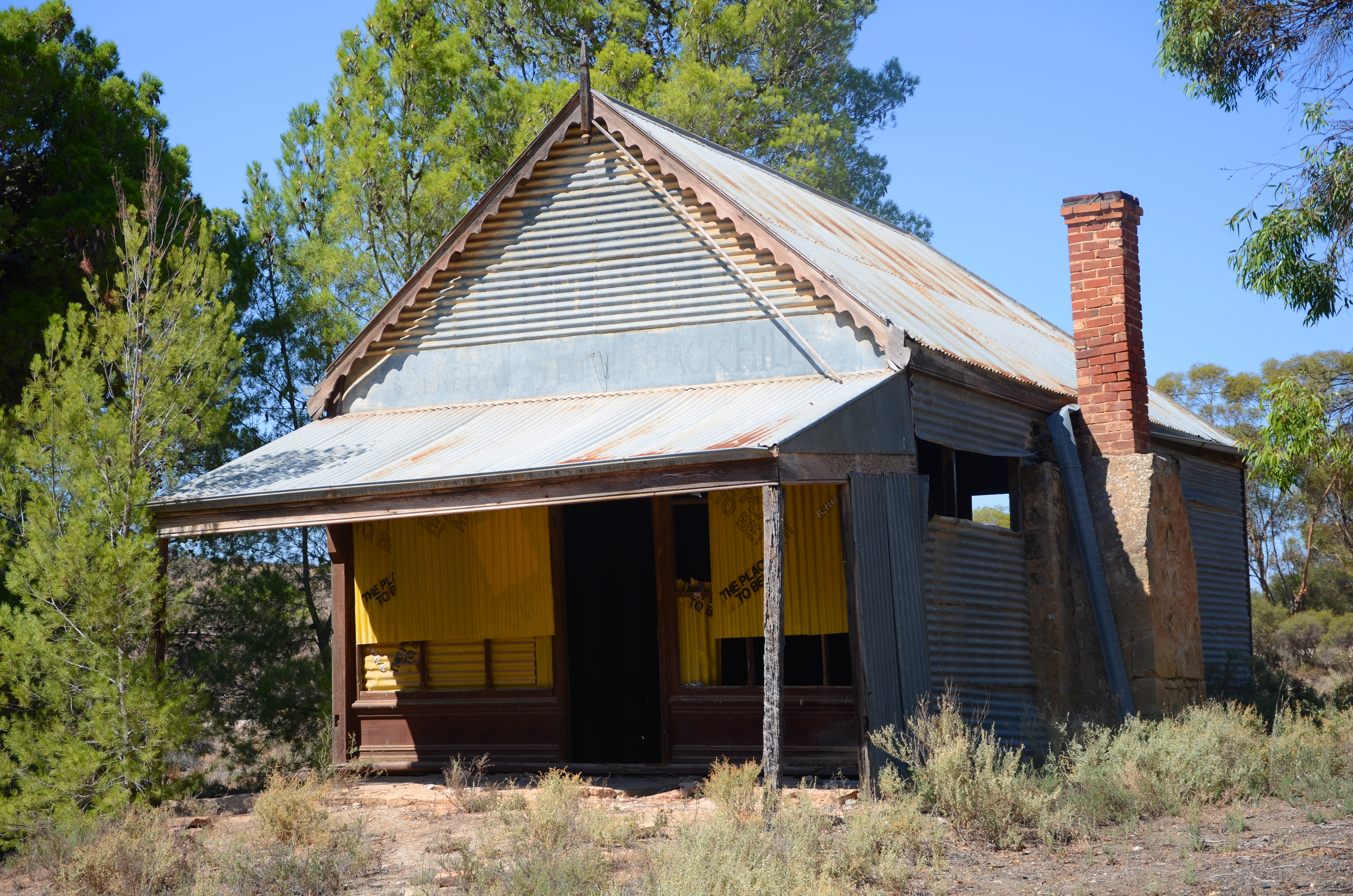
- Abandoned store, Black Hill

- Coordinates: 34.703°S 139.457°E
- Country: Australia
- State: South Australia
- LGA: Mid Murray Council
- Location: 19 km (12 mi) SE of Cambrai

Government
  - State electorate: Schubert
  - Federal division: Barker

Population
  - Total: 45 (SAL 2021)
- Postcode: 5353
Localities around Black Hill
Sedan	Swan Reach	Sunnydale
Cambrai	Black Hill	Wongulla
	Mannum	Walker Flat

Black Hill is a settlement in South Australia. Black Hill is between the Mount Lofty Ranges and the Murray River on the banks of the Marne River. Until 1918, when many place names were changed if they sounded German, Black Hill was known as Friedensthal.

Prior to white settlement, the area was owned by the Ngaiawang people.

The Black Hill post office and shop have long since closed. The school operated from 1894 to 1945. The post office opened in 1891. The township was first settled in 1890 as Friedensthal (Valley of Peace). Prior to that, it had been part of a station owned by Thomas R Reynolds. Black Hill Rocks provide the source for two commercial granite quarries that have been used in significant buildings in Australia.
