= TDN =

TDN may refer to:

- ISO 639-3 code for Tondano language
- Naval Aircraft Factory TDN, a target drone produced by the U.S. Naval Aircraft Factory during the Second World War
- Televisa Deportes Network, a Mexican television sports channel
- Three Dog Night, American rock group
- 1,1,6-Trimethyl-1,2-dihydronaphthalene, an aroma compound in wine
- Turkish Daily News, an English language newspaper in Turkey
