= Marne River (South Australia) =

Marne Rhine River South
- Location of the river mouth in South Australia
- Etymology: Marne River (France)
- Native name: Taingappa (Ngarrindjeri)

Location
- Country: Australia
- State: South Australia
- Region: Barossa Ranges
- Towns: Cambrai

Physical characteristics
- Source: Mount Lofty Range
  - location: south of Eden Valley
  - coordinates: 34°40′00″S 139°06′34″E
  - elevation: 366 m (1,201 ft)
- Mouth: Murray River
  - location: Wongulla
  - coordinates: 34°41′58″S 139°34′37″E
  - elevation: 5 m (16 ft)
- Length: 70 km (43 mi)

Basin features
- River system: River Murray catchment
- Tributaries
  - right: Rhine North
- Protected area: Marne Valley Conservation Park

The Marne River, formerly known as the Rhine River South (/raɪn/ RYNE), is a river in the Barossa Ranges region in the Australian state of South Australia. It is part of the River Murray catchment.

== Course and features ==
The Marne River rises below Eden Valley on the eastern slopes of the Mount Lofty Ranges and flows generally east before reaching its confluence with the River Murray at Wongulla. The Marne flows through Cambrai. The Marne descends 361 metres (1,184 ft) over its 70-kilometre (43 mi) course.

== Etymology ==
In pre-European times, the Ngarrindjeri people used the Marne Valley as a route up into the hills to trade with the Peramangk people in the Barossa Valley and to cut bark canoes from the river red gums in the hills which had thicker bark than those near the Murray. The original name of the Marne River was Taingappa, meaning footrack-trading road.

Before 1917, it was called the Rhine River South. Due to anti-German sentiment during World War I, it was renamed after the Marne River of France, where the German advance was stopped in 1914.

== See also ==
- Rivers of South Australia
