= Flaxman Valley, South Australia =

Flaxman Valley South Australia
- Coordinates: 34.615°S 139.042°E
- Population: 285 (SAL 2021)
- Postcode(s): 5235
- LGA(s): Barossa Council
- State electorate(s): Schubert
- Federal division(s): Barker
Localities around Flaxman Valley:
Bethany	Angaston	Keyneton
Krondorf	Flaxman Valley	Eden Valley
Pewsey Vale	Mount Crawford	Springton

Flaxman Valley is a locality on the eastern slopes of the Barossa Ranges in South Australia. The unbounded locality of Craneford was originally a private subdivision and is now also located in the Bounded Locality of Flaxman Valley.

Flaxman Valley is in the Eden Valley wine region, partly in the High Eden subregion. It was named after Charles Flaxman, the chief clerk of George Fife Angas.

The Kaiserstuhl Conservation Park is in Flaxman Valley.
