= List of wineries in the Eden Valley =

This is a list of wineries in the Eden Valley, a wine-producing region in South Australia which is located within the Barossa wine zone adjacent to the Barossa Valley wine region.

== List ==
Winery	Production	Established
Berton Vineyard		
Eden Hall Winery		
Eden Springs	2,000	1972
Eden Valley Wines		
Fernfield Wines		2002
Flaxman Wines	1500	2005
Heggies Vineyard Estate	13,000	1971
Hartz Barn Wines	2,600	1997
Henschke	40,000	1868
Hill Smith Estate	5,000	1979
Irvine Wines	10,000	1980
Mountadam	35,000	1972
Karra Yerta	300	2006
Peter Seppelt Wines		
Pewsey Vale	20,000	1847
Poonawatta Estate	800	1880
Poverty Hill Wines	6,000	2002
Radford Wines	900	2003
Torzi Matthews Vintners	2,500	1996
Yalumba		

== See also ==
- South Australian wine
- Eden Valley wine region
- High Eden
- List of wineries in the Barossa Valley
- List of wineries in South Australia
