= William Gilbert (pastoralist) =

South Australian pastoralist and vigneron

- Born: 12 October 1850
- Died: 29 March 1923 (aged 72); Pewsey Vale
- Occupation(s): pastoralist and vigneron

William Gilbert (12 October 1850 – 29 March 1923) was a South Australian pastoralist and vigneron.

He was born the only son of Joseph Gilbert (1800–1881) of Pewsey Vale near Lyndoch and his wife Anna née Browne (1812–1873). He was educated at St Peter's College, and in 1864 enrolled with Cambridge University.

In 1872 he helped Ted Bagot (1848–1881) and his foster-brother James Churchill-Smith (1851–1922) drove 1,000 head of cattle from Adelaide to the MacDonnell Ranges where he had acquired three leases centred on Owen Springs Station and Edward Meade Bagot another two, on Emily Gap and Undoolya Stations; this was recognised as one of the great droving feats of Australian pastoral history. He took up management of Owen Springs station in 1873 and in 1875 was managing of all his father's properties.

When his father died he disposed of Owen Springs, the freehold of 32,000 acres at Mount Bryan, and the Oriecowe run on Yorke Peninsula in order to concentrate on stock improvement at Pewsey Vale. It was not long before his wool was fetching record prices. He had considerable success with wines also, though according to one source, he treated winemaking more as a hobby than a business. Having increased output in one year to 17,000 imperial gallons (77,000 L) this would rank as a very serious hobby.

Shortly before his death in North Adelaide, he transferred the Wongalere property near Williamstown to his son William, who had been developing its vineyard. William junior sold Pewsey Vale shortly after inheriting it to pay probate duties.

== Other interests ==
He was appointed to the board of governors of St Peter's College in 1894.

He was appointed a founding director of Bagot Shakes & Lewis formed by amalgamation of E. M. Bagot & Co and Shakes & Lewis in 1888.

== Family ==
He married Mary Young Clindening (26 January 1854 – 7 May 1939), daughter of Dr. William Talbot Clindening MRCS (6 January 1825 – 7 June 1899), on 22 July 1879. Their 11 children included:

- Henry Gilbert (8 June 1880 – 25 October 1947) was a noted medical practitioner of North Adelaide, closely associated with the Adelaide Children's Hospital and St Mark's College
- Mary (8 September 1881 – 28 December 1881)
- Anna Gertrude (ca.23 March 1883 – 23 July 1883)
- Joseph (2 August 1884 – 26 May 1915) was employed as an engineer by Westinghouse in Manchester, joined the Territorial Army in August 1914 and was killed at Gallipoli.
- William (16 February 1887 – ) married Catherine Pauline Browne on 14 December 1917.
- Thomas (12 September 1889 – 1 May 1938)
- John Driffield Gilbert (31 August 1893 – 18 Oct 1917) was a pilot with the Royal Flying Corps 56th Squadron in France. He was lost, presumed killed, while on patrol over Bas Warneton near Ypres.
