= Mount McKenzie, South Australia =

Mount McKenzie South Australia
- Coordinates: 34.56°S 139.08°E
- Population: 58 (SAL 2021)
- Postcode(s): 5353
- Location: 9 km (6 mi) south of Angaston; 11 km (7 mi) north of Eden Valley; 80 km (50 mi) northeast of Adelaide
- LGA(s): Barossa Council
- State electorate(s): Schubert
- Federal division(s): Barker
Localities around Mount McKenzie:
Angaston
	Mount McKenzie	Keyneton
Flaxman Valley

Mount McKenzie is a locality on the eastern side of the Barossa Council area in South Australia. It is traversed by Eden Valley Road, between Angaston and Eden Valley. The current boundaries of the locality were set in May 2003 for the long-established name for the area. The school opened in 1882, but has long since closed. The community hall founded in 1926 is still active. Mount McKenzie Post Office opened as a postal receiving office on 2 January 1914, became a regular post office in June 1915, and closed in 1965.

The Collingrove Hillclimb course is on the eastern side of Mount McKenzie.
