= Cambrai, South Australia =

Cambrai Rhine Villa
- Town
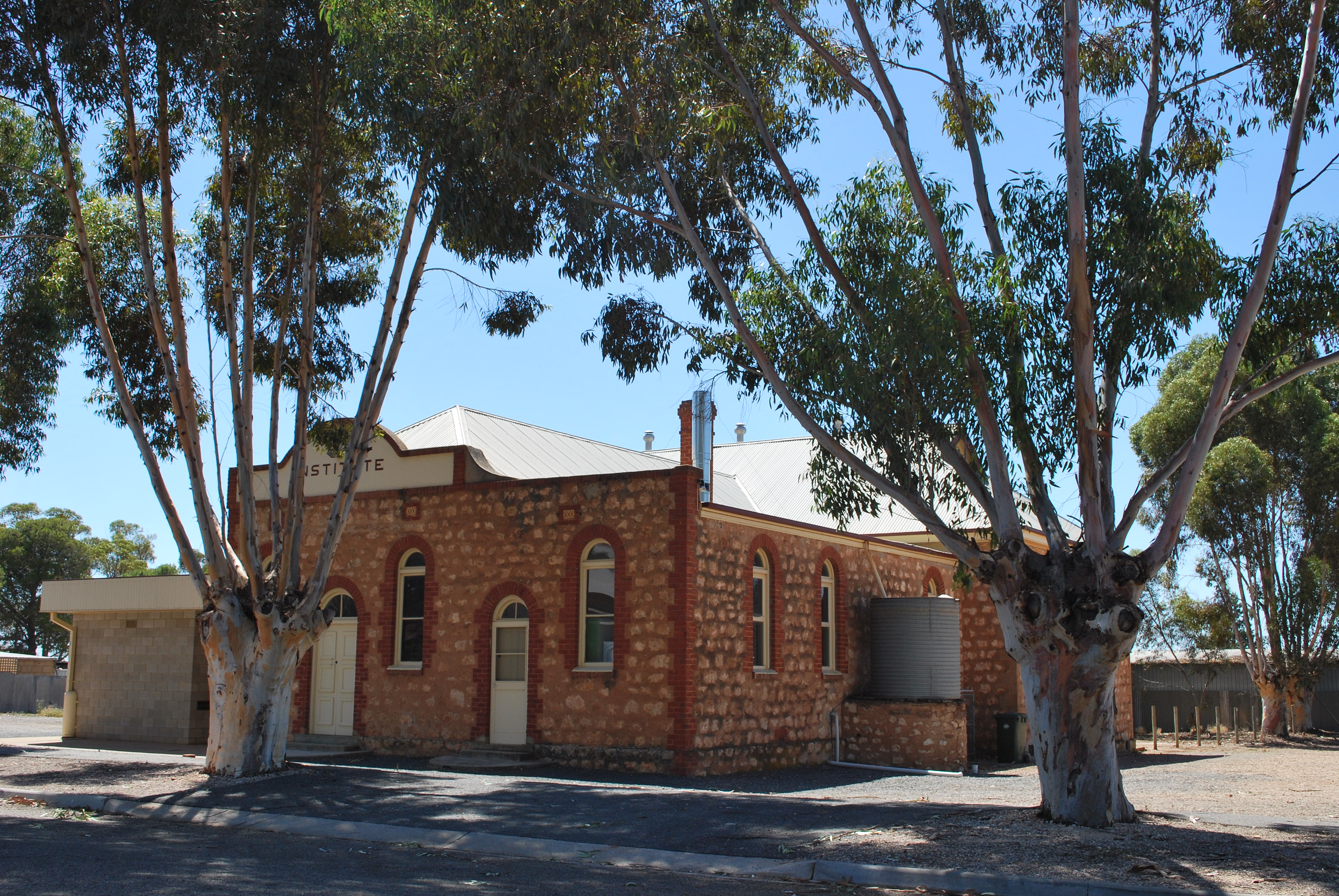
- Institute

- Coordinates: 34°39′20″S 139°16′49″E
- Country: Australia
- State: South Australia
- Region: Murray and Mallee
- LGA: Mid Murray Council
- Location: 70 km (43 mi) from Adelaide

Government
  - State electorate: Chaffey
  - Federal division: Barker

Population
  - Total: 266 (2021 census)
- Time zone: UTC+9:30 (ACST)
  - Summer (DST): UTC+10:30 (ACST)
- Postcode: 5353
- County: Sturt
- Mean max temp: 19.8 °C (67.6 °F)
- Mean min temp: 6.8 °C (44.2 °F)
- Annual rainfall: 758.0 mm (29.84 in)
Localities around Cambrai
Keyneton	Keyneton; Sedan	Sedan
Keyneton; Eden Valley	Cambrai	Black Hill
Eden Valley	Sanderston; Angas Valley; Mannum	Mannum

Cambrai is a small town located on the eastern side of the Mount Lofty Ranges, along the River Marne. Originally named Rhine Villa (/raɪn/ RYNE), it was one of many Australian towns renamed during World War I to remove any connection with German place names and named after the Battle of Cambrai.

It was located on the Sedan railway line. It served as the terminus of the line from 1964 until the 1980s.

The bounded locality of Cambrai includes the former unbounded locality of Rheinthal (German: [ˈʁaɪ̯nˌtaːl]), which was approximately 3 km north of the town of Cambrai. It had a Lutheran church and school. The school was closed from 1916 (when all German schools were closed) until 1935, and closed permanently from 1955. It also includes the Marne Valley Conservation Park and the locality of Kongolia (previously Rhine Park) to the east of the town.
