= North Para River =

River in South Australia

North Para
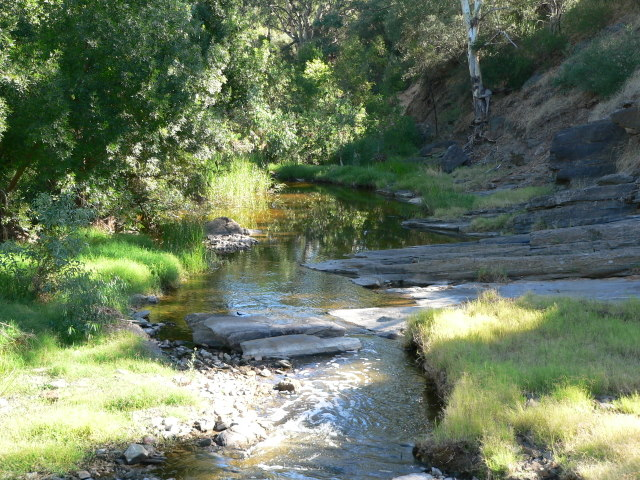
- North Para River near Rowland Flat

- Location of the river mouth in South Australia

Location
- Country: Australia
- State: South Australia
- Region: Barossa Valley
- Towns: Gawler

Physical characteristics
- Source: Barossa Ranges
  - location: Flaxman Valley 34°36'49.35"S 139° 3'30.97"E
  - elevation: 399 m (1,309 ft)
- Mouth: confluence with the South Para River to form the Gawler River
  - location: at Gawler
  - coordinates: 34°36′S 138°45′E
  - elevation: 48 m (157 ft)
- Length: 79 km (49 mi)

Basin features
- River system: Gawler River
- Tributaries
  - left: Angaston Creek, Jacobs Creek, Lyndoch Creek
  - right: Greenock Creek, Walkers Creek

The North Para River is a river in the Barossa Valley of the Australian state of South Australia.

The river's name is based directly on the Kaurna word pari which means river. The "north" descriptor distinguishes it from the South Para River with which it merges.

== Course and features ==
The North Para River rises in the Barossa Ranges near Eden Valley and follows a meandering path through the Barossa Valley, firstly north to the east of Angaston, then arcs around to the southwest to pass through the towns of Nuriootpa and Tanunda, before merging with the South Para River in Gawler forming the Gawler River. The river descends 351 metres (1,152 ft) over its 79-kilometre (49 mi) course.

The North Para River catchment is one of the key watersheds in the northern Mount Lofty Ranges. It plays a very important role in the economy of South Australia, providing much of the water used by viticulture in the Barossa Valley. Its waters are also used for livestock production, cereal cropping and recreation.

== See also ==
- Hundred of Nuriootpa
- Hundred of Barossa
- List of rivers of Australia § South Australia
