= Jacobs Creek (Australia) =

Stream in South Australia

Jacobs Jacob's
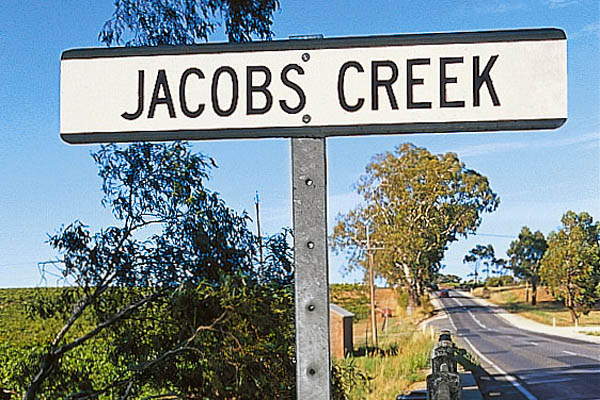
- Sign at Jacob's Creek along the Barossa Valley Highway

- Location of the river mouth in South Australia

Location
- Country: Australia
- State: South Australia
- Region: Mid North

Physical characteristics
- Source: Barossa Ranges
- Mouth: confluence with the North Para River
  - location: Rowland Flat
  - coordinates: 34°33′47″S 138°55′48″E

Basin features
- River system: Gawler River

Jacob's Creek is a small creek in the Mid North region of the Australian state of South Australia.

== Course and features ==
Jacob's Creek rises in the Barossa Ranges and flows westward through the wine-producing region of the Barossa Valley, approximately 80 kilometres (50 mi) north of Adelaide. The creek is several kilometres long and eventually meets the North Para River at Rowland Flat. The watercourse is studded with ancient and picturesque river red gums.

It was first discovered (but not named) by Europeans in December 1837 by an expedition led Colonel William Light and was surveyed in 1839 by his assistant surveyor, William Jacob (1814–1902), as part of a wider survey of the Barossa region. Jacob settled here in the early 1840s, hence the origin of the name. In the local Aboriginal dialect it is called "Cowieaurita", meaning "yellow-brown water", in an area known to them as Moorooroo, which became the name of the hundred.

In the early 1840s Jacob's Creek was briefly home to Johann Menge, South Australia's first geologist, who lived for some time on an island and in a nearby cave on the creek. Here he grew vegetables, and was particularly struck with the possibilities for viticulture. Menge was influential in facilitating the settlement from the Barossa Valley by German Lutheran immigrants.

The creek lent its name to the wine brand Jacob's Creek, which is produced by Orlando Wines, located 2 kilometres (1.2 mi) southwest along the Barossa Valley Highway in the small town of Rowland Flat. Johann Gramp, the founder of Orlando Wines, first planted grape vines on the banks of Jacob's Creek in 1847.

In 1997 Orlando Wines, in conjunction with the Northern Adelaide and Barossa Catchment Water Management Board, commenced a rejuvenation project for Jacob's Creek. All non-native plants and trees, such as bamboo, ash and olives were removed, and replanted with blue gums, red gums and other Australian native trees and shrubs. As a result of the project, many native species of frogs, native fish, and waterbirds have returned, with the creek gradually returning to its former natural state.

== See also ==
- List of rivers of Australia § South Australia
