= Marne Valley Conservation Park =

Park in South Australia

- IUCN category III (natural monument or feature)
- Location within South Australia
- Location: South Australia, Cambrai
- Nearest city: Cambrai
- Coordinates: 34°38′41″S 139°22′15″E
- Area: 94 ha (230 acres)
- Established: 11 March 1976
- Visitors: "few visitors" (in 1994)
- Governing body: Department for Environment and Water
- Website: Official website

Marne Valley Conservation Park is a protected area in the Australian state of South Australia located in the locality of Cambrai about 77 kilometres (48 mi) north-west of the state capital of Adelaide and about 30 kilometres (19 mi) west of the municipal seat of Mannum.

The conservation park consists of land in section 4 of the cadastral unit of the Hundred of Angas. It is bounded by Laucke Road in the north and in part by Black Hill Road in the south. The Marne River passes through the conservation park. It was proclaimed under the National Parks and Wildlife Act 1972 on 11 March 1976. As of 2019, it covered an area of 94 hectares (230 acres).

In 1980, the conservation park was described as follows:

This park preserves a fine stand of Eucalyptus camaldulensis open forest in seasonal swamps of the Marne River Valley .

Marne Valley Conservation Park preserves a section of the Marne River bed containing two seasonal swamps and adjoining areas of higher ground. The river bed and swamp areas contain a fine example of an E. camaldulensis open forest over a closed grassland understorey. Areas of dense young E. camaldulensis growth are occurring along the edges of one swamp. Higher ground has a low woodland of E. largiflorens regrowth with Myoporum platycarpum over an understorey of grasses and low shrubs.

The E. largiflorens low woodland shows evidence of having been felled in the past. The understorey throughout the park has been much modified and is dominated by introduced weeds.

The conservation park is classified as an IUCN Category III protected area. In 1980, it was listed on the now-defunct Register of the National Estate.

== See also ==
- Protected areas of South Australia
