= Eden Valley, South Australia =

Eden Valley South Australia
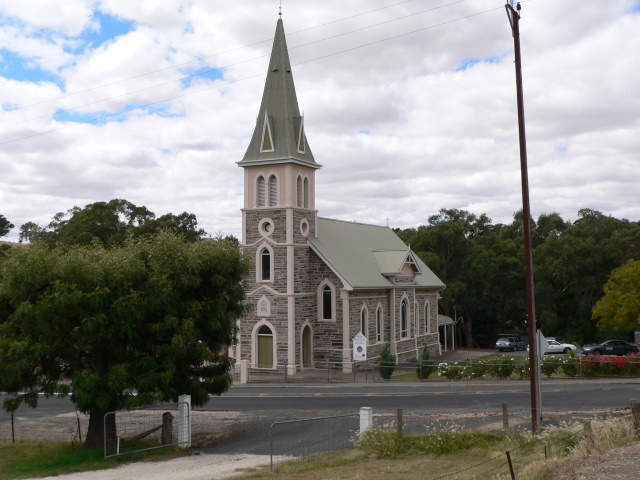
- The St Petri Lutheran Church at Eden Valley, 2006

- Coordinates: 34.641°S 139.098°E
- Population: 390 (SAL 2021)
- Established: 1864
- Postcode(s): 5235
- Elevation: 305 m (1,001 ft)
- Location: 55 km (34 mi) NE of Adelaide
- LGA(s): Barossa Council
- State electorate(s): Schubert
- Federal division(s): Barker
Localities around Eden Valley:
| Mount McKenzie | Keyneton | Sedan |
| Flaxman Valley | Eden Valley | Cambrai |
| Mount Crawford | Taunton, Springton | Sanderston |
- Footnotes: Elevation, coordinates

Eden Valley is a small South Australian town in the Barossa Ranges. It was named by the surveyors of the area after they found the word "Eden" carved into a tree. Eden Valley has an elevation of 460 metres and an average annual rainfall of 716.2mm. Eden Valley is in the Barossa Council local government area, the state electoral district of Schubert and the federal divisions of Barker and Mayo.

== Wine industry ==
Eden Valley gives its name to a wine growing region that shares its western boundary with the Barossa Valley wine region. The region is of similar size to the Barossa Valley wine region, and is well known for producing high quality riesling and shiraz wines. Englishman Joseph Gilbert planted the first Eden Valley vineyard, Pewsey Vale, in 1847. Within the Eden Valley region there is a sub-region called High Eden which is located higher in the Barossa Ranges, giving lower temperatures.

== See also ==
- List of wineries in the Eden Valley
