= High Eden =

Coordinates: 34°40′02″S 139°01′17″E

- Wine region
- Type: GI
- Year established: 2001
- Country: Australia
- Part of: Eden Valley wine region
- Location: Barossa Ranges
- Growing season: April
- Total area: 40 square kilometres (15 sq mi)
- Varietals produced: Shiraz, Riesling

High Eden is the Australian geographical indication of a subregion of the Eden Valley wine region within the Barossa zone in Australia. The High Eden wine region was entered in the Register of Protected Names on 28 August 2001. It is a somewhat oval shaped area in the western part of Eden Valley of slightly less than 40 square kilometres with an elevation of about 500 metres above sea level, the highest point in Eden Valley. It contains parts of the localities of Flaxman Valley and Pewsey Vale. The region is sparsely populated and the hilly terrain is generally unspoilt with native vegetation such as giant red gum trees intact. Minute blue wrens and wedge-tailed eagles inhabit the area.

The main grape varieties grown are Riesling, Cabernet Sauvignon, Shiraz and Chardonnay. Harvest time is usually early to late April. Due to the climate (cool, high winds, low growing season rainfall) and relatively poor soils, High Eden vineyards are usually low yield yielding.
