= Kaiserstuhl Conservation Park =

Protected area in South Australia

- IUCN category III (natural monument or feature)
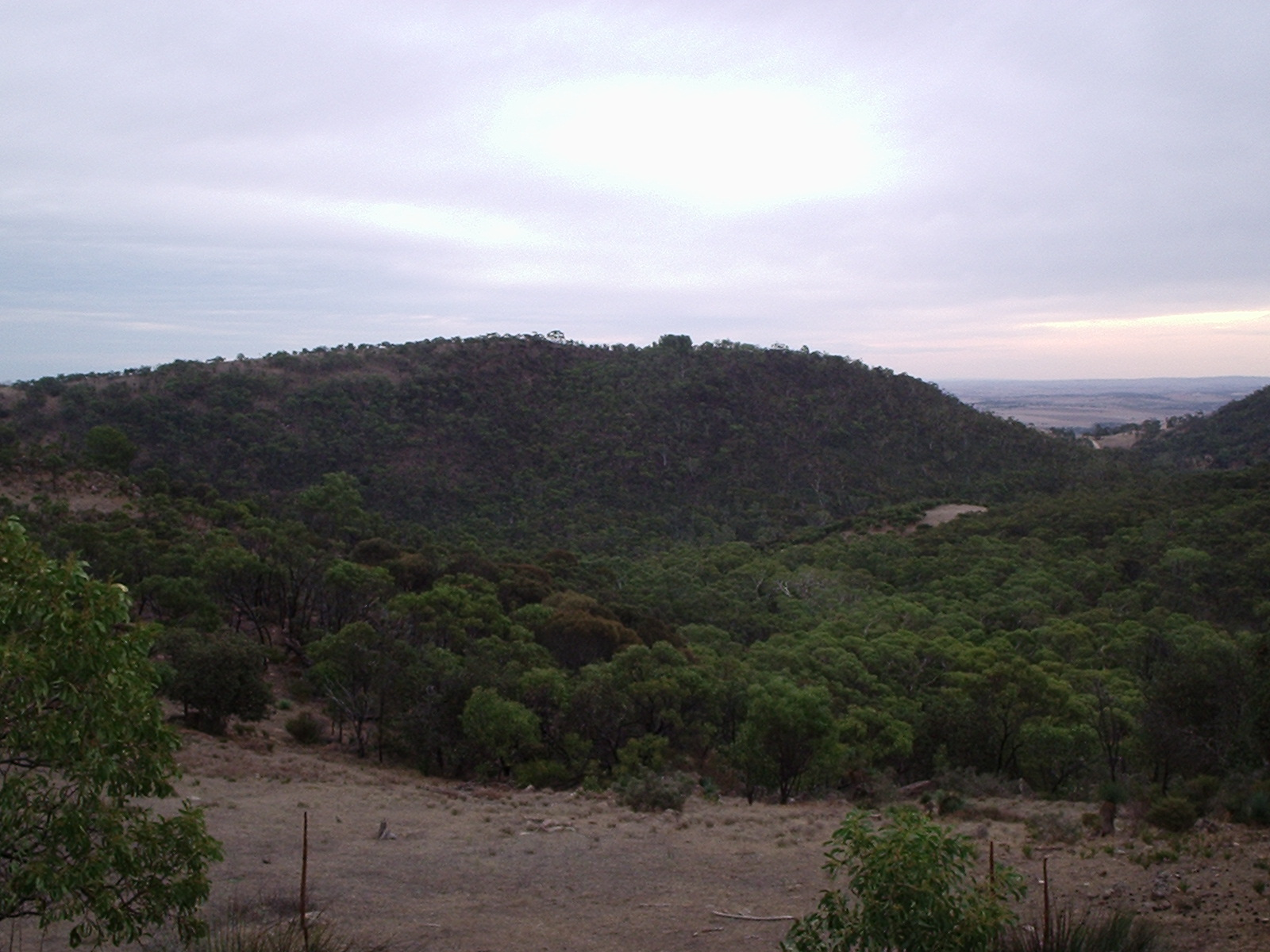
- The Kaiserstuhl

- Location within South Australia
- Location: South Australia
- Nearest city: Tanunda
- Coordinates: 34°35′04″S 139°00′48″E
- Area: 4.35 km^{2} (1.68 sq mi)
- Established: 3 May 1979
- Visitors: 5,000 to 10,000. (in 2006)
- Governing body: Department for Environment and Water
- Website: Official website

The Kaiserstuhl Conservation Park (German: [ˈkaɪ̯zɐˌʃtuːl]) is a protected area located in the Australian state of South Australia in the suburb of Flaxman Valley about 80 kilometres (50 mi) north-east of the state capital of Adelaide and about 12 kilometres (7.5 mi) south-east of the town of Tanunda.

The conservation park consists of land in sections 531, 623, 730, 732, 733, 736, 737, 844, 859, 860, 861 and 862 in the cadastral unit of the Hundred of Moorooroo and which is an area bounded in the east by a sealed road, Tanunda Creek Road. The Heysen Trail, the long distance walking trail, passes along the west side of the conservation park.

It was proclaimed under the National Parks and Wildlife Act 1972 on 3 May 1979 for the above-mentioned parcels of land with exception to sections 859, 860, 861 and 862 which were added by proclamation on 3 December 1987. It is named after a hill called Kaiserstuhl which is located to its immediate west in the suburb of Pewsey Vale. As of 2016, it covered an area of 4.35 square kilometres (1.68 sq mi).

The conservation park is classified as an IUCN Category III protected area. In 1980, it was listed on the now-defunct Register of the National Estate.

== Kaiserstuhl/Patpoori ==
Kaiserstuhl (literally "emperor's chair") is a mountain of about 600 metres (2,000 ft) height located in a northern part of the Mount Crawford Forest (Kaiserstuhl Native Forest Reserve) in the locality of Pewsey Vale. It was named by geologist Joseph Menge after the Kaiserstuhl mountain range near Freiburg in southwestern Germany, a famous winegrowing region. It is dual-named with the Aboriginal name Patpoori. The German name was changed to Mount Kitchener in 1918, but has since been changed back.
