= Krondorf, South Australia =

Krondorf
- Town
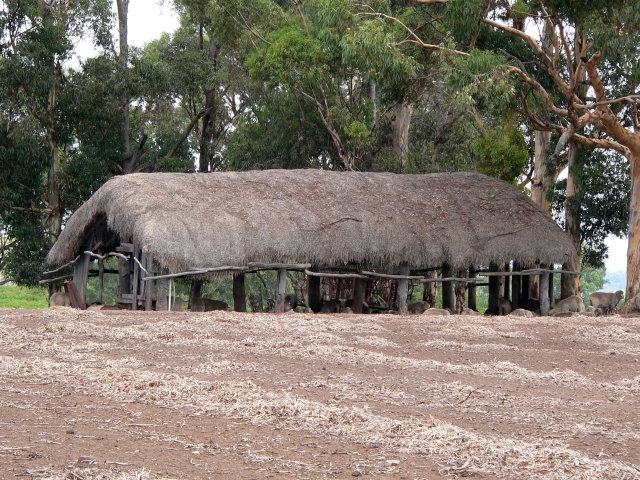
- A thatched roof barn in 2006 at Krondorf, South Australia

- Coordinates: 34.560770°S 138.971480°E
- Country: Australia
- State: South Australia
- LGA: Barossa Council

Government
  - State electorate: Schubert
  - Federal division: Barker

Population
  - Total: 63 (SAL 2021)
- Postcode: 5352
Localities around Krondorf
Tanunda	Bethany	Angaston
	Krondorf	Flaxman Valley
Rowland Flat	Pewsey Vale	Flaxman Valley

Krondorf (lit. 'Crown's Village' in German; pronounced [ˈkʁoːnˌdɔʁf]) is a locality in the Barossa Valley in South Australia.

Prior to 1918, the name of the locality may have been Kronsdorf ([ˈkʁoːnsˌdɔʁf]). In 1918, it was changed to Kabminye (an Australian Aboriginal word for stars) when many Australian placenames were changed to sound less German. An alternate name that was proposed instead of Kabminye was Blennerhassett, in honour of Lady Galway, wife of the Governor of South Australia and daughter of Sir Roland Blennerhassett. It was changed back to Krondorf in 1975.

Krondorf (or Kronsdorf) was first settled in 1847 by Germans from nearby Bethany. The Zum Kripplein Christi Lutheran church was built in 1864 and closed in 1955. The church has been renovated by the owners of Charles Melton Wines, a local winery, to provide bed-and-breakfast accommodation.
