= Joseph Gilbert (winemaker) =

Pastoralist and winemaker in South Australia

- Born: 1800; Vale of Pewsey, Wiltshire, England
- Died: 23 December 1881 (aged 80–81); Pewsey Vale, South Australia
- Occupation: pastoralist

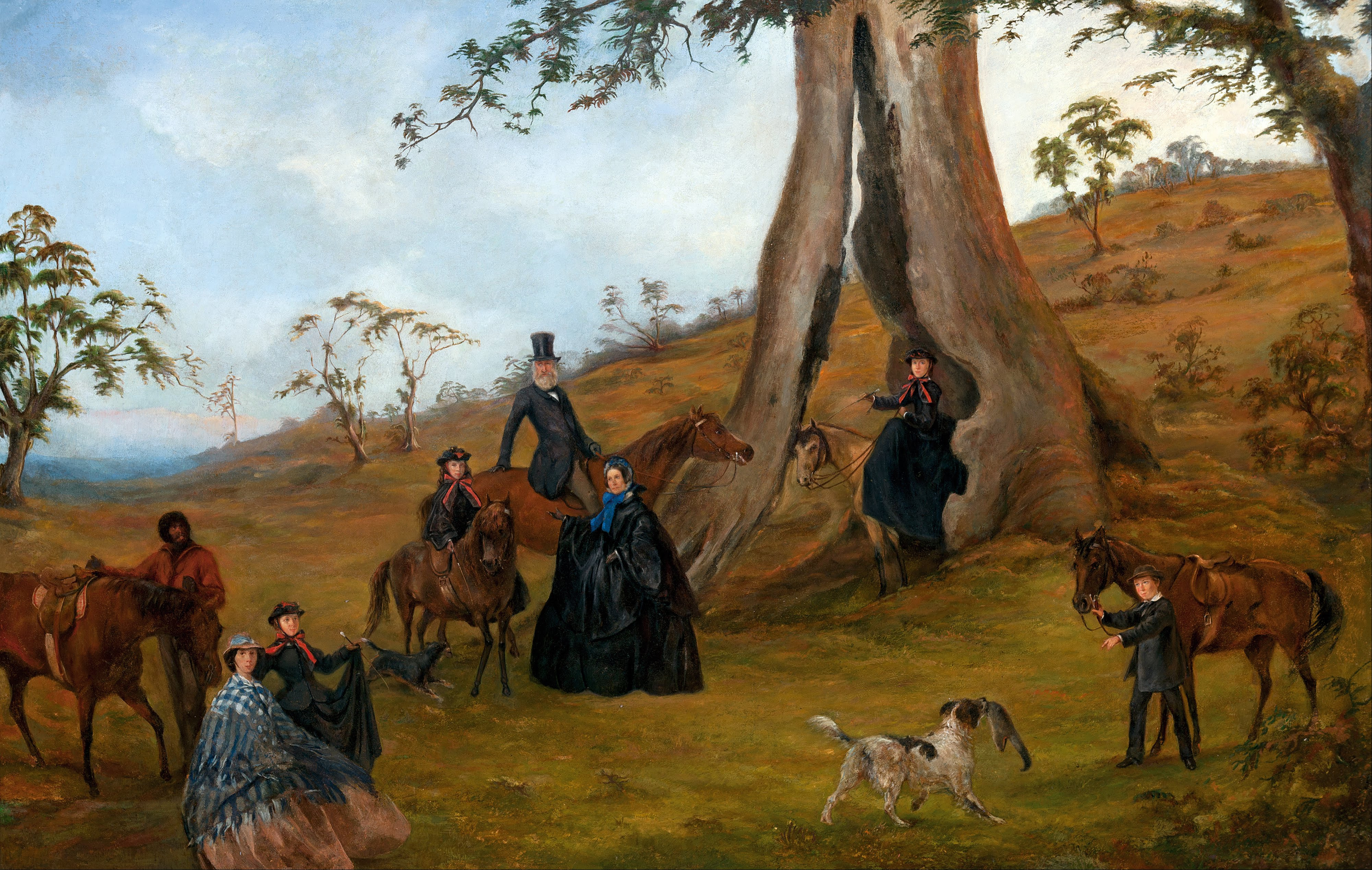
The Gilbert family (1864)

Joseph Gilbert (1800 – 23 December 1881) was a pastoralist and winemaker in South Australia from 1839 until his death.

Gilbert was born in Puckshipton, Wiltshire, England, in the Vale of Pewsey. The second of four sons, his father was Joseph Gilbert and his mother, Jane (née Pike). He studied at Marlborough College in Wiltshire and learnt about vine-growing and winemaking on the European mainland.

He migrated to South Australia in 1839 on the Buckinghamshire and immediately erected his prefabricated two-roomed Manning cottage on an Adelaide allotment. He acquired a property on the South Para River and stocked it with sheep purchased from Van Diemen's Land. He later moved his flock to a selection near Lyndoch, which he named "Pewsey Vale" and developed into an ideal country home.

In 1847 he established Pewsey Vale winery in Eden Valley, the same year Jacob's Creek winery was established in the neighbouring Barossa Valley, with substantial cellars, and Pewsey Vale clarets, burgundies and hocks achieved considerable success.

He married Anna Browne (1812–1873) in 1848. Her brothers Dr. William James Browne (1815 – 4 December 1894) and Dr. John Harris Browne (1817–1904) made a wedding present of the property "Wongalere" near Williamstown. Joseph's brother William emigrated to South Australia and leased Wongalere for ten years, after which it was managed by Joseph's son, also called William.

In 1872 he acquired leases 3-5 in the Northern Territory, just north of Oodnadatta. His son William, in company with James Churchill-Smith and E. M. "Ted" Bagot (whose father E. M. "Ned" Bagot had acquired leases 1&2) drove 1,000 head of cattle from Adelaide to the MacDonnell Ranges.

Gilbert was a member of the South Australian Jockey Club and raced several good horses, notably Ace, Ace of Trumps (1874 Adelaide Cup winner), Skylark, Lapdog and Poodle.

Joseph and Anna Gilbert and several of their descendants were buried at the Pewsey Vale Anglican Cemetery built on land excised from their property in 1861; around half the graves or memorials are for members of the Gilbert family.

== Family ==
Joseph Gilbert married Anna Browne (26 April 1812 – 28 September 1873), sister of Dr. W. J. Browne, at "Wongalere" on 21 January 1848. They had three children:

- William Gilbert (12 October 1850 – 29 March 1923) born at "Pewsey Vale", married Mary Young Clindening (26 January 1854 – 7 May 1939) on 22 July 1879; further developed the Pewsey Vale Estate. For details of their large family, see his article.
- Jane Gilbert (14 August 1852 – 21 January 1936) married Edward Charles Stirling MB FRCS (8 September 1848 – 20 March 1919) on 27 June 1877.
- Sarah Gilbert (24 June 1856 – 25 May 1936) married Colonel John Adam Dalrymple-Fergusson (7 May 1845 – 5 December 1920) on 31 July 1871 and retired to England. (Fergusson became Professor of Tactics, Military Law and Administration at Royal Military College, Sandhurst, Berkshire).

== Recognition ==
His name was given to the Adelaide suburb of Gilberton, South Australia.
