= Pewsey Vale, South Australia =

Pewsey Vale South Australia
- Coordinates: 34.6205°S 138.9676°E
- Population: 79 (2016 census)
- Postcode(s): 5351
- LGA(s): Barossa Council
- State electorate(s): Schubert
- Federal division(s): Barker
Localities around Pewsey Vale:
Rowland Flat	Krondorf
Altona, Lyndoch	Pewsey Vale	Flaxman Valley
Williamstown	Mount Crawford

Pewsey Vale is a locality east of the southern Barossa Valley in the western part of the Eden Valley of South Australia. It was first established as a sheep station pastoral run in the early years of the colony by Joseph Gilbert. Gilbert named his run Pewsey Vale in 1839 after the Vale of Pewsey in Wiltshire, England, where he was born. It was originally to be called Karrawatta, however this name was easily confused with the neighboring Tarrawatta.

Over the years, Gilbert planted grapevines and made wine, as well as running sheep at Pewsey Vale and other pastoral leases in the colony. The school and chapel were built by Gilbert in 1861, and the cemetery contains predominantly only Gilbert and his relatives.

The vineyards planted by William Gilbert were removed shortly after World War I. New vineyards were planted in the 1960s in conjunction with the Yalumba wine company.

== See also ==
- Pewsey Vale, a vineyard
