= 1,1,6-Trimethyl-1,2-dihydronaphthalene =

Names
- Preferred IUPAC name 1,1,6-Trimethyl-1,2-dihydronaphthalene
- Other names 1,2-Dihydro-1,1,6-trimethylnaphthalene

Identifiers
CAS Number	30364-38-6
3D model (JSmol)	Interactive image
Abbreviations	TDN
ChEBI	CHEBI:89773
ChemSpider	108567
ECHA InfoCard	100.045.577
EC Number	250-150-8
PubChem CID	121677
UNII	01HD1KNX99
CompTox Dashboard (EPA)	DTXSID30184443
- InChI: InChI=1S/C13H16/c1-10-6-7-12-11(9-10)5-4-8-13(12,2)3/h4-7,9H,8H2,1-3H3 Key: RTUMCNDCAVLXEP-UHFFFAOYSA-N
- SMILES: CC1=CC2=C(C=C1)C(CC=C2)(C)C

Properties
Chemical formula	C_{13}H_{16}
Molar mass	172.271 g·mol^{−1}
Boiling point	115 °C (239 °F; 388 K) at 18 Torr
- Except where otherwise noted, data are given for materials in their standard state (at 25 °C [77 °F], 100 kPa). Infobox references

1,1,6-Trimethyl-1,2-dihydronaphthalene (TDN) is an aroma compound present in wine, particularly aged Rieslings. Chemically, it is classified as a 13C-norisoprenoid, as it has thirteen carbon atoms, and is derived from an isoprenoid by the loss of methylene groups.

In wines, TDN is generally considered to contribute to a desirable aroma in low concentrations, but an undesirable aroma in higher concentrations. The aroma is commonly described as a petrol note or by the French term goût de pétrole.

TDN is believed to be a degradation product of β-carotene and lutein. TDN can also by synthesized in the laboratory from either of the ionones, α-ionone or β-ionone.
