= Barossa zone (wine) =

Wine zone in South Australia

- Wine region
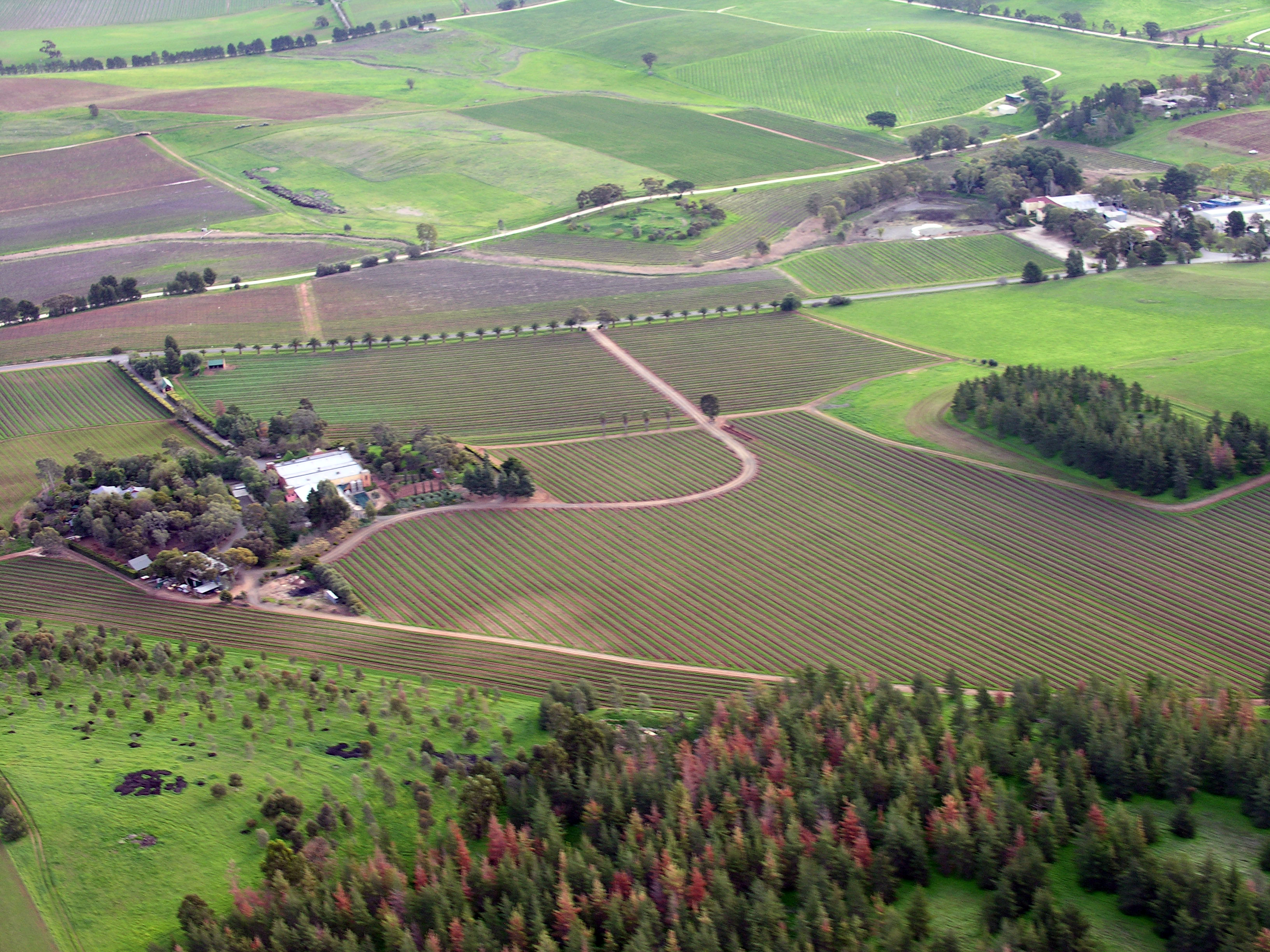
- Type: Australian Geographical Indication
- Year established: 1996.
- Country: Australia
- Part of: South Australia
- Sub-regions: Barossa Valley, Eden Valley

Barossa zone is a wine zone located in central South Australia west of the Murray River and which occupies the Barossa Valley, the Eden Valley and some adjoining land. The zone which is enclosed by the Mount Lofty Ranges zone on three sides and by the Lower Murray zone to its east, contains two wine regions which have received appellation as Australian Geographical Indications (AGI). These are the Barossa Valley and Eden Valley regions. The Barossa zone also includes a broader area around these two defined regions. The zone received AGI in 1996.

== Extent and appellation ==
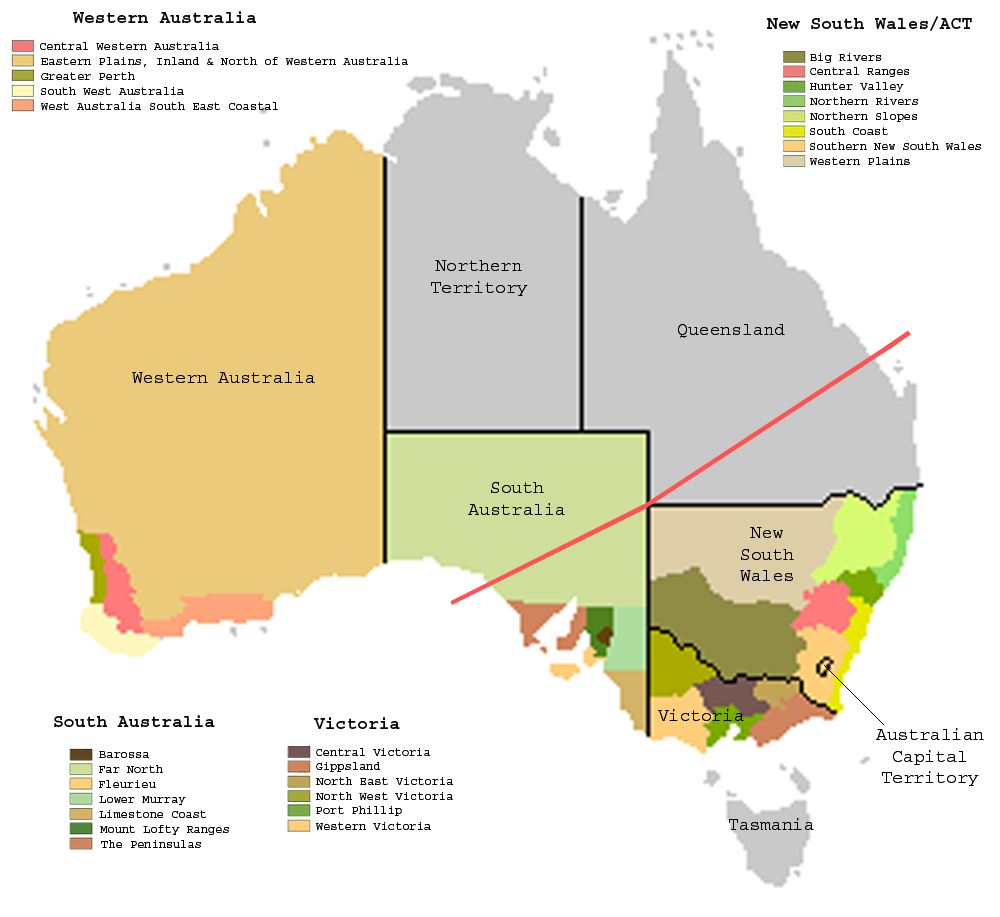
Australian wine zones & regions

The Barossa zone covers an area of central South Australia including the Barossa Valley and the area to its immediate east on the Mount Lofty Ranges (known as Eden Valley). The zone is bounded at the west by the Horrocks Highway from near Templers to Gawler in the south while its southern boundary includes the South Para River and runs in an easterly direction including Williamstown but excluding Mount Pleasant then turning north just west of Sanderston. The east boundary runs due north with one turn to the east including the eastern slopes of the ranges to north of the Sturt Highway. The northern boundary includes Truro and turns north to follow the Light River excluding Kapunda and then through Freeling, South Australia. The zone is enclosed by the Mount Lofty Ranges zone on all but its east side which borders the Lower Murray zone. The term ‘Barossa’ was registered as an AGI under the Wine Australia Corporation Act 1980 on 27 December 1996. The zone boundary is based on the lands administrative divisions of South Australia, and consists of the whole of the hundreds of Belvidere, Nuriootpa, Moorooroo, Jellicoe, Barossa, Jutland, plus a small part of the hundred of Para Wirra where it extends between Williamstown and Springton.

== Constituent regions ==
The wine zone consists of the following wine regions - Barossa Valley and Eden Valley.

=== Barossa Valley wine region ===
The Barossa Valley wine region covers an area extending from Freeling in the west to just south of Kapunda in the northwest, Truro in the northeast, Angaston in the east and south of Williamstown in the south. The region is bordered by the Eden Valley wine region to the east and by the Adelaide Hills wine region to the south. The term ‘Barossa Valley’ was registered as an AGI on 15 August 1997 and as of 2012, it is represented by 37 wineries.

=== Eden Valley wine region ===
Eden Valley wine region covers an area in the Mount Lofty Ranges extending from Truro in the north to just south of Springton in the south. The region is bordered by the Barossa Valley wine region to the west and by the Adelaide Hills wine region to the south. The region was registered as an AGI on 15 August 1997 and as of 2014, it is represented by 37 wineries.

== See also ==
- South Australian wine
