= Barossa Range =

Mountain range in South Australia

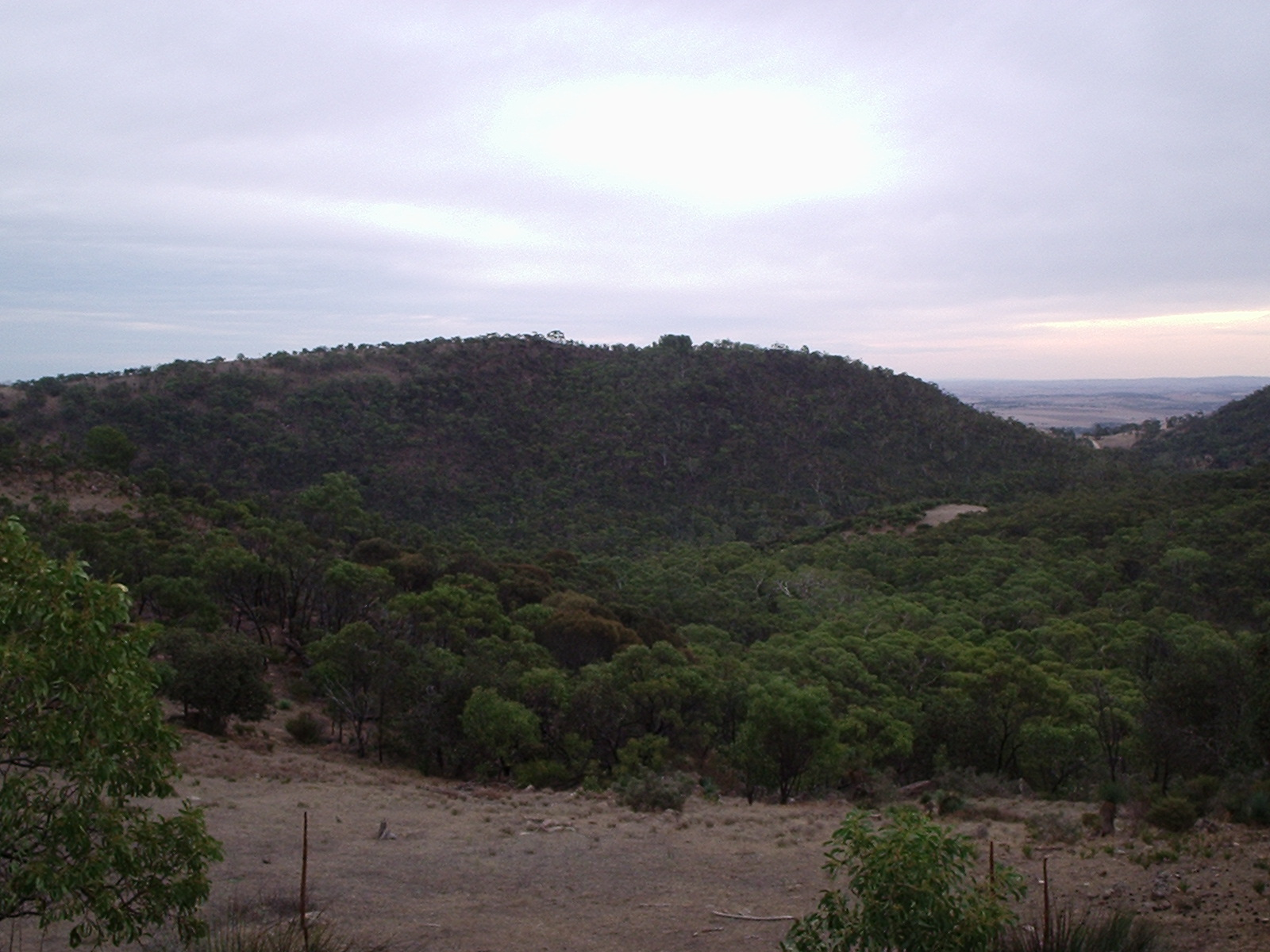
- Mount Kaiser Stuhl, pictured in 2005

Highest point
- Elevation: 588 m (1,929 ft)
- Parent peak: Mount Kaiser Stuhl
- Coordinates: 34°34′48″S 138°59′23″E

Naming
- Native name: Yampoori (Kaurna)

Geography
- Location within South Australia
- Location: Adelaide Hills, South Australia, Australia
- Parent range: Mount Lofty Range

Geology
- Mountain type: Mountain range

The Barossa Range (Kaurna: Yampoori) is a mountain range in the Australian state of South Australia.

== Location ==
The range is a part of the southern Mount Lofty Ranges and the western slopes primarily fall into the Barossa Valley. As such, the range is the main source for the North Para River and its tributary Jacob's Creek. The highest point of the range is Mount Kaiser Stuhl with an elevation of 588 metres (1,929 ft) AHD and forms part of the Kaiserstuhl Conservation Park. Mengler Hill, another notable peak within the range, lies on the road route from Tanunda to Angaston.

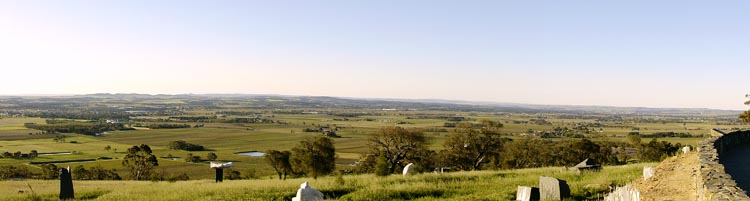
View of the Barossa Valley facing northwest from Mengler Hill

== Naming ==
The range was named by Colonel William Light in 1837 after Barrosa Hill (Cerro de Puerco) in the modern municipality of Chiclana de la Frontera, Spain, to which it he thought it similar. The Spanish location was the site of the Battle of Barrosa and was won by Light's friend Lord Lynedoch (Lt. Gen. Sir Thomas Graham) in 1811. The word barrosa (mis-spelt in the naming of the valley, two 'r' and one 's' becoming one 'r' and two 's'; similarly the nearby town of 'Lyndoch' rather than 'Lynedoch'), in Spanish and Portuguese languages simply means "muddy". Confusion regarding the spelling and origin of the range also resulted in mistaken moves to change it as part of 'de-Germaning' during the First World War ('Kaiser Stuhl', for example, temporarily being renamed 'Mount Kitchener').

Thus named, the Barossa Range was the source of many other local place names, such as the Hundred of Barossa and better-known Barossa Valley.

== Settled features ==
The Heysen Walking Trail and the Mawson Cycling Trail both traverse the range.

It is also home to some of the many wineries in the region, including those in Eden Valley.

== See also ==
- Barossa Valley (wine)
