= Riesling =

White grape variety

- Grape (Vitis)
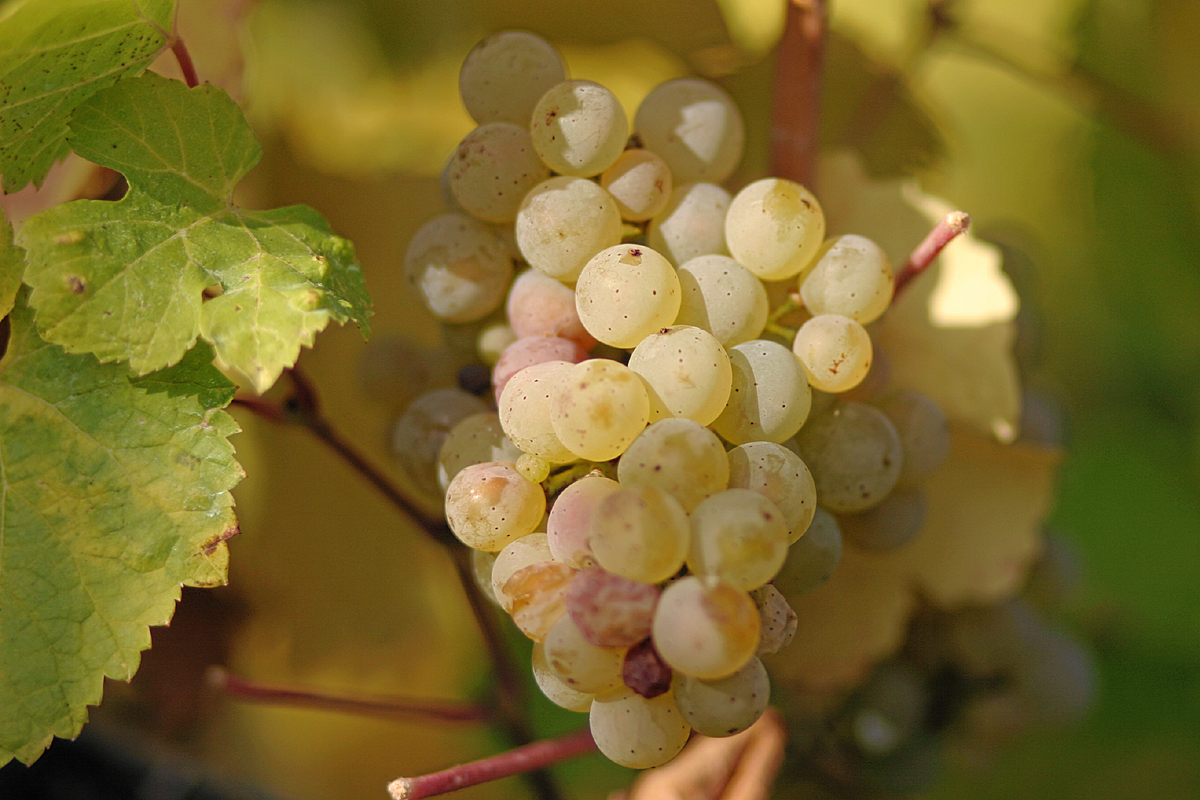
- Ripe Riesling grapes in Rheingau, Germany
- Color of berry skin: Blanc
- Species: Vitis vinifera
- Also called: Rhein Riesling, Johannisberger
- Origin: Rhine, Germany
- Notable regions: Germany, Hungary, Luxembourg, France, Austria, Slovakia, Croatia, Italy, Australia, New Zealand, South Africa, United States, Canada
- Notable wines: Eiswein, Trockenbeerenauslese, Beerenauslese, Grosses Gewächs, Alsace Grand Cru, Wachau Smaragd
- Hazards: Underripeness in colder regions
- VIVC number: 10077

Riesling (/ˈriːslɪŋ, ˈriːzlɪŋ/ REE-sling, REEZ-ling, German: [ˈʁiːslɪŋ]) is a white grape variety that is believed to have originated from the Rhine Valley region of western Germany, before later being traced to the Alsace region by 1470 and Austria by 1700. Riesling is an aromatic grape variety displaying flowery, almost perfumed aromas as well as high acidity. It is used to make dry, semi-sweet, sweet, and sparkling white wines. Riesling wines are usually varietally pure and are seldom oaked. As of 2004, Riesling was estimated to be the world's 20th most grown variety at 48,700 hectares (120,000 acres) (with an increasing trend), but in terms of importance for quality wines, it is usually included in the "top three" white wine varieties together with Chardonnay and Sauvignon blanc. Riesling is a variety that is highly "terroir-expressive", meaning that the character of Riesling wines is greatly influenced by the wine's place of origin.

In cooler regions, such as the Mosel in Germany, Riesling wines often display apple and tree fruit notes with pronounced acidity that is sometimes balanced by residual sugar. As a late-ripening variety, Riesling can develop citrus and peach notes in warmer areas such as the Palatinate, Alsace, and parts of Austria. In Australia, Riesling is often noted for a characteristic lime note that tends to emerge in examples from the Clare Valley and Eden Valley in South Australia.

Riesling's naturally high acidity and pronounced fruit flavors give wines made from the grape good aging potential, with well-made vintages often developing smokey, honey notes, and aged German Rieslings, in particular, taking on a "petrol" character, as a result of the development of the compound TDN.

In 2015, Riesling was the most grown variety in Germany with 23.0% and 23,596 hectares (58,310 acres), and in the French region of Alsace with 21.9% and 3,350 hectares (8,300 acres). In Germany, the variety is particularly widely planted in the Palatinate, Rheinhessen, Mosel, Rheingau, Nahe, and Baden.

There are also significant plantings of Riesling in Austria, Slovenia, Serbia, Czech Republic, Slovakia, Luxembourg, northern Italy, Australia, New Zealand, Canada, South Africa, China, Crimea, and the United States (Washington, California, Michigan, and New York). Welschriesling, common in Central and Southeastern Europe, ist not related to Riesling.

== History ==
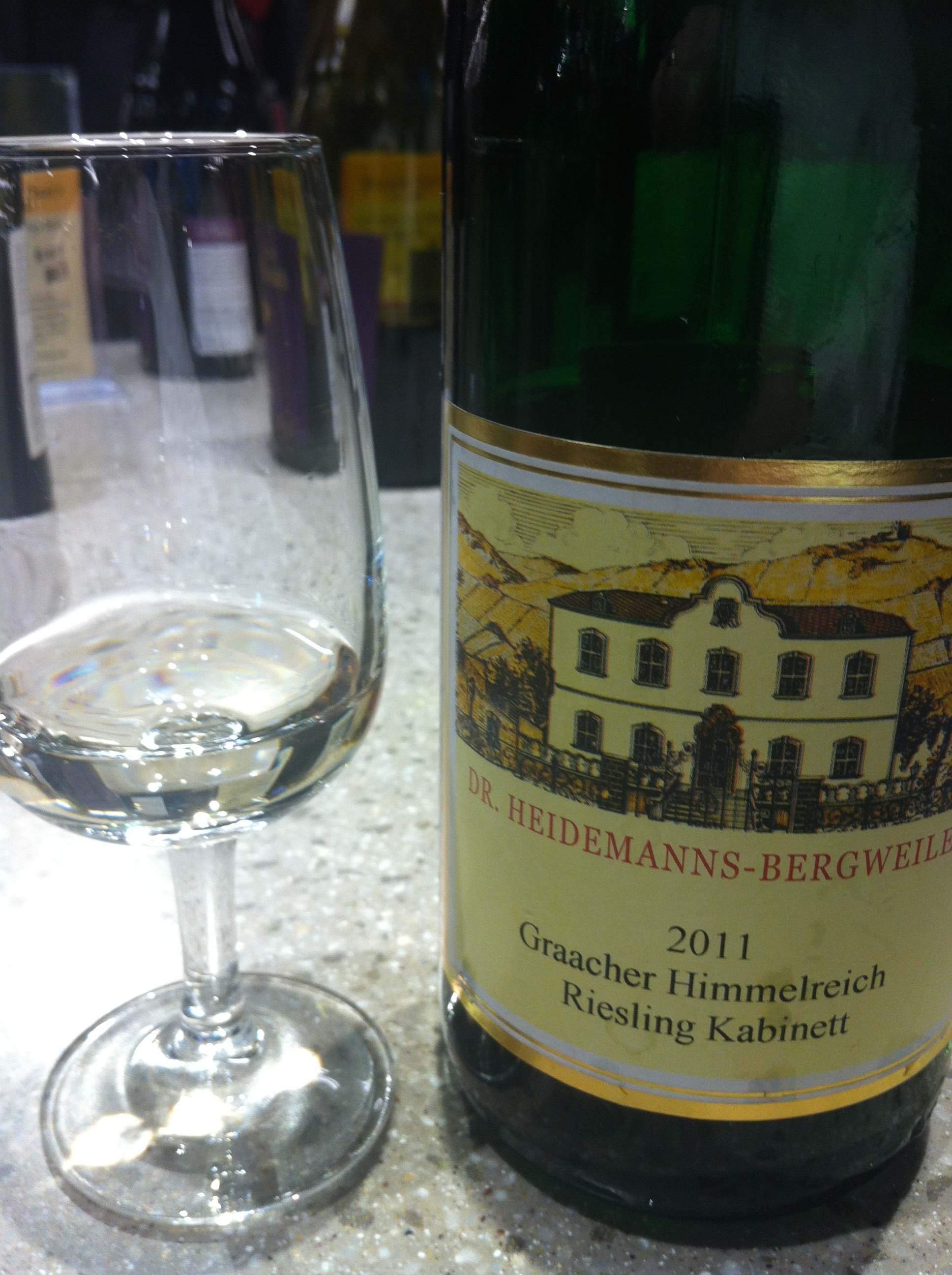
A Kabinett-level German Riesling from the Mosel

Riesling has a long history, and there are several written references to the variety dating from the 15th century, although with varying orthography. The earliest of these references dates from March 13, 1435, when the storage inventory of Count John IV of Katzenelnbogen in Rüsselsheim (close to the Rheingau) lists "22 ß umb seczreben Rießlingen in die wingarten" ("22 shillings for Riesling vine cuttings for the vineyard"). The spelling Rießlingen is repeated in many other documents of the time. The modern spelling Riesling was first documented in 1552 when it was mentioned in Hieronymus Bock's Latin herbal.

A map of Kintzheim in Alsace from 1348 contains the text zu dem Russelinge, but it is not certain that this reference is to the grape variety. However, in 1477, Riesling was documented in Alsace under the spelling Rissling. In Wachau in Austria, there is a small stream and a small vineyard both called Ritzling, which are claimed locally to have given Riesling its name. However, there seems to be no documentary evidence to back this up, so this claim is not widely believed to be correct.

=== Parentage ===
Earlier, Riesling was sometimes claimed to have originated from wild vines of the Rhine region, without much support to back up that claim. More recently, DNA fingerprinting by Ferdinand Regner indicated that one parent of Riesling is Gouais blanc, known to the Germans as Weißer Heunisch, a variety that, while rare today, was widely grown by the French and German peasantry of the Middle Ages. The other parent is a cross between a wild vine and Traminer. It is presumed that the Riesling was born somewhere in the valley of the Rhine, since both Heunisch and Traminer have a long documented history in Germany, but with parents from either side of the Adriatic the cross could have happened anywhere on the way.

It has also been suggested, but not proved, that the red-skinned version of Riesling is the forerunner of the common, "white" Riesling. The genetic differences between white and red Riesling are minuscule, as is also the case between Pinot noir and Pinot gris.

== Longevity ==
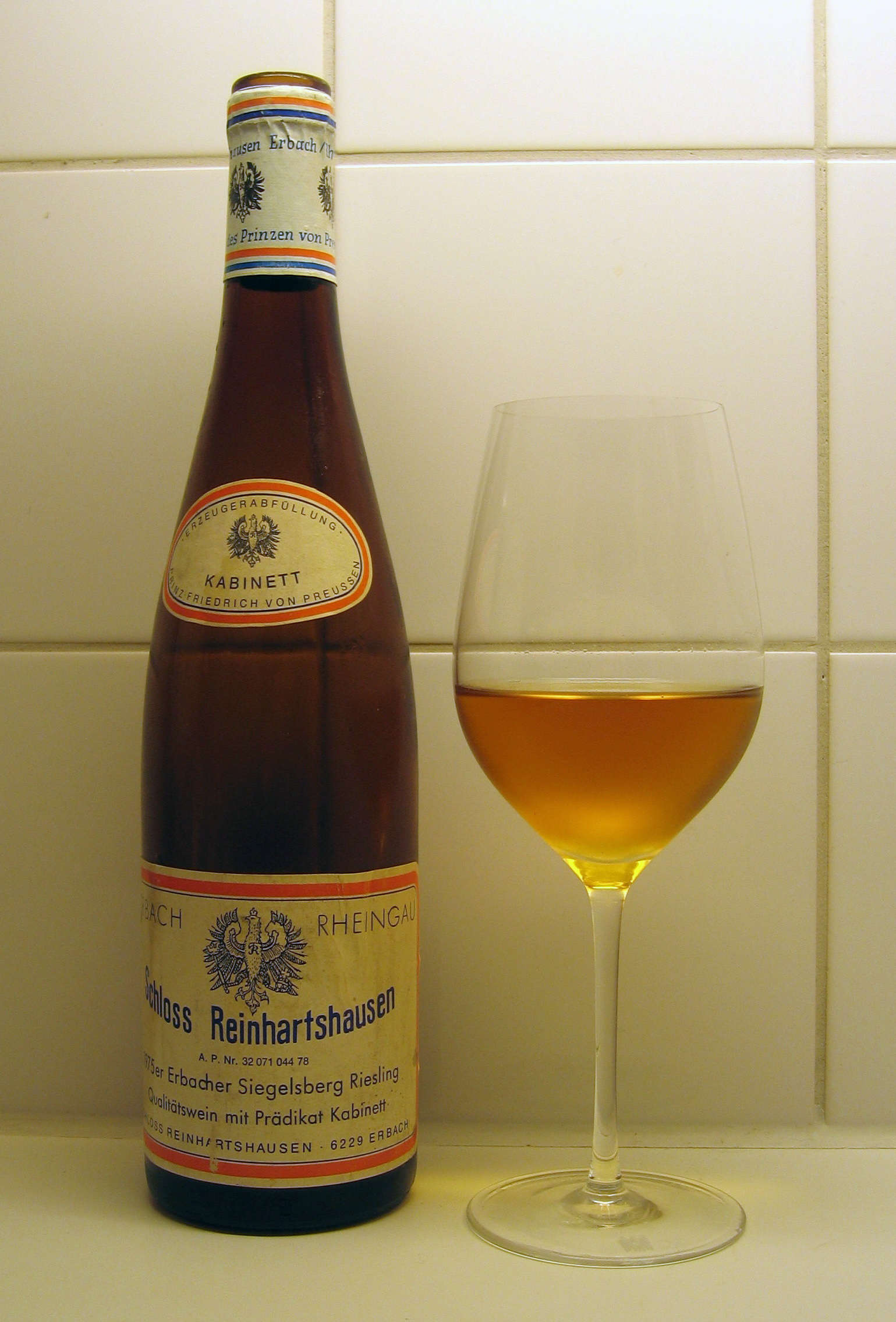
A German Riesling from the 1975 vintage, an Erbacher Siegelsberg Kabinett from Schloss Reinhartshausen in Rheingau, uncorked at 32 years of age in 2007. It shows the typical golden to amber colour of aged Riesling, which is shared by many other aged white wines.

Riesling wines are often consumed when young, when they make a fruity and aromatic wine that may have aromas of green or other apples, grapefruit, peach, gooseberry, honey, rose blossom or cut green grass, and usually a crisp taste due to the high acidity. However, Riesling's naturally high acidity and range of flavours make it suitable for extended aging. International wine expert Michael Broadbent rates aged German Rieslings, some hundreds of years old, highly. Sweet Riesling wines, such as German Trockenbeerenauslese, are especially suited for cellaring since the high sugar content provides for additional preservation. However, high-quality dry or off-dry Riesling wine is also known not just to have survived but also to have been enjoyable at an age exceeding 100 years.

The Ratskeller (council wine cellar) of the townhall of Bremen, Germany, stores 650+ German wines, including Riesling-based wines, often in barrel and back to the 1653 vintage.

More common aging periods for Riesling wines would be 5–15 years for dry, 10–20 years for semi-sweet and 10–30+ for sweet versions.

=== Petroleum notes in aged Riesling wines ===
On release, certain Riesling wines reveal a striking petrol note (goût de pétrole in French) that is sometimes described with comparisons to kerosene, lubricant, or rubber. While an integral part of the aroma profile of mature Riesling and sought after by many experienced drinkers, it may be off-putting to those unaccustomed to it, and those who primarily seek the fruity aromas that typically characterize young Riesling wine. While petrol notes may be identified in Rieslings from any territory, they are most commonly found in aged Australian wines. The negative attitude to petrol aromas in young Riesling, and the preference for fruitier young wines of this variety, seem more common in Germany than in Alsace or on the export market, and some German producers, especially the volume-oriented ones, have even gone so far as to consider the petrol notes a defect which they try to avoid, even at the cost of producing wines that are less suited to extended cellar aging. In that vein, the German Wine Institute has gone so far as to omit the mentioning of "petrol" as a possible aroma on their German-language Wine Aroma Wheel, which is supposed to be specially adapted to German wines, and despite the fact that professor Ann C. Noble had included petrol in her original version of the wheel.

The petrol note is considered to be caused by the compound 1,1,6-trimethyl-1,2-dihydronaphthalene (TDN), which during the aging process is created from carotenoid precursors by acid hydrolysis. The initial concentration of precursors in the wine determines the wine's potential to develop TDN and petrol notes over time. From what is known of the production of carotenoids in grapes, factors that are likely to increase the TDN potential are:

- Ripe grapes, i.e., low yields and late harvest
- High sun exposure
- Water stress, which is most likely in regions which do not practice irrigation, and there primarily in certain dry vineyard sites in hot and dry years
- High acid content

These factors are usually also considered to contribute to high-quality Riesling wines, so the petrol note is in fact more likely to develop in top wines than in simpler wines made from high-yielding vineyards, especially those from the New World, where irrigation is common.

== Noble rot ==
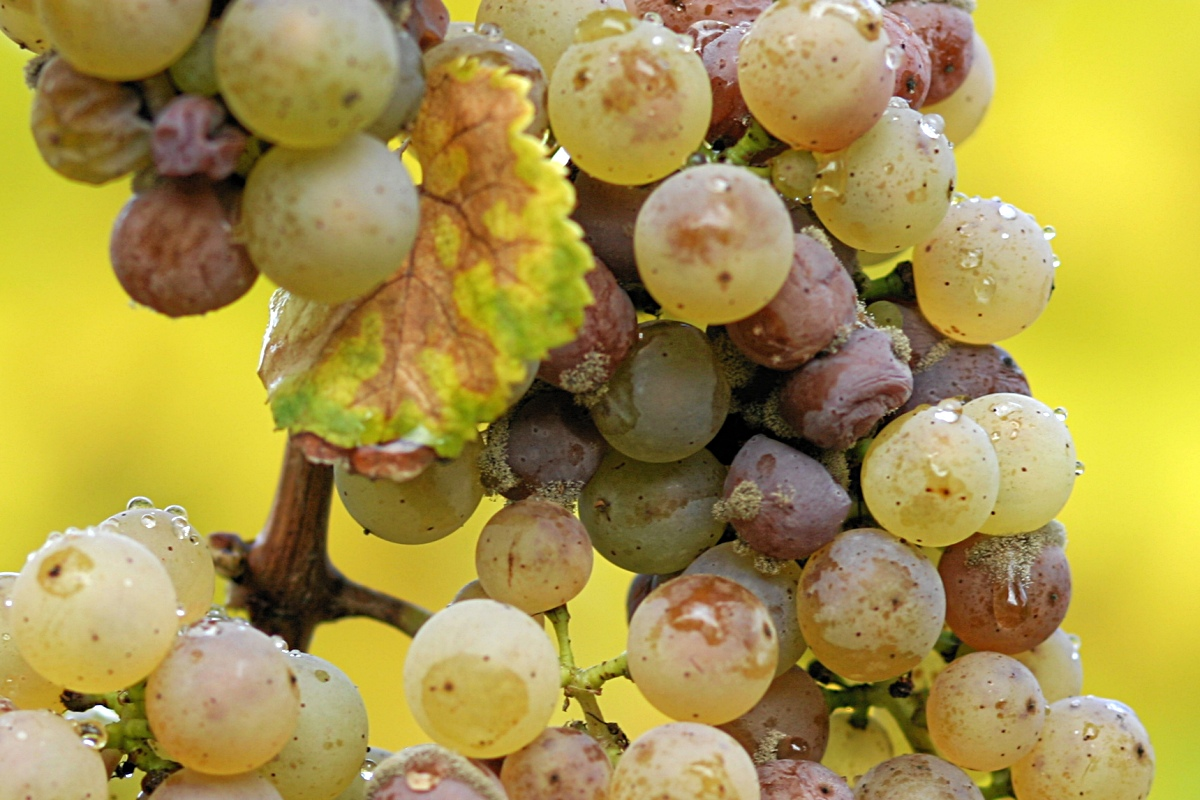
A bunch of Riesling grapes after the onset of noble rot. The difference in colour between affected and unaffected grapes is clearly visible.

The most expensive wines made from Riesling are late harvest dessert wines (often amongst the most expensive in the world), produced by letting the grapes hang on the vines well past normal picking time. Through evaporation caused by the fungus Botrytis cinerea ("noble rot") or by freezing and pressing (as is the case for ice wine – in German: Eiswein), water is removed and the resulting ultra concentrated juice is used to make the sweet wines. These wines are felt to offer richer layers on the palate, and have more sugar (in extreme cases hundreds of grams per litre), more acid (to give balance to the sugar), more flavour, and more complexity. These elements combine to make wines that are amongst the most long lived of all white wines. The beneficial use of "noble rot" in Riesling grapes was discovered in the late 18th century at Schloss Johannisberg. Permission from the Abbey of Fulda (which owned the vineyard) to start picking Riesling grapes arrived too late and the grapes had begun to rot; yet it turned out that the wine made from them was still of excellent quality.

Noble rot is employed in many viticultural areas, including the Clare, Barossa, and Eden Valleys in South Australia, and in the southern growing region of Tasmania, though none are as renowned as those from Germany.

== Production regions ==
Riesling is considered one of the grape varieties that best expresses the terroir of the place where it is grown. It is particularly well suited for slate and sandy clay soil.

=== Germany ===
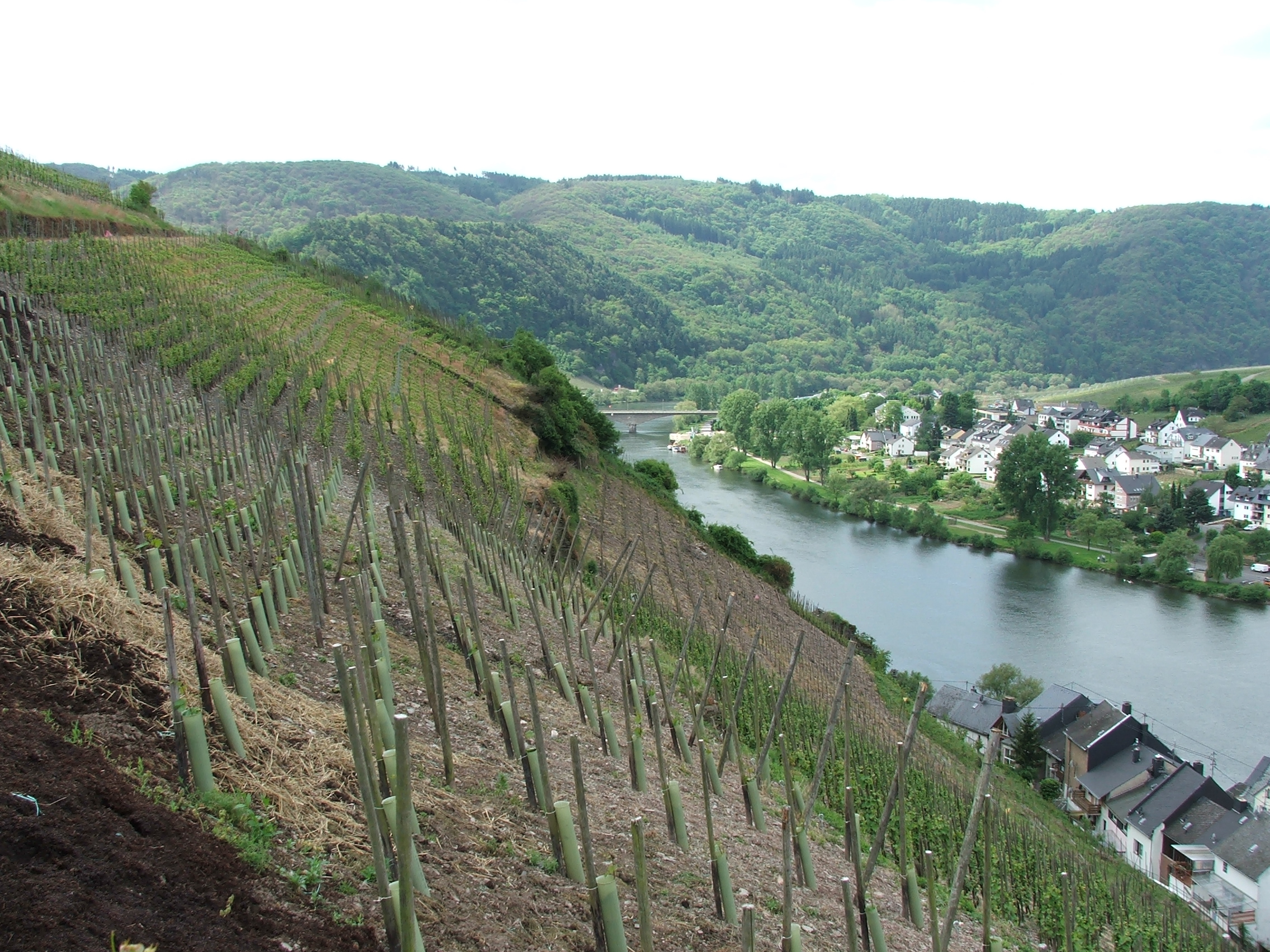
Riesling vines on a steep, south-facing slope in the Mosel region

Riesling is Germany's leading grape variety, with the country accounting for around 40% of global production. German Riesling is known for its characteristic “transparency” in flavour and presentation of terroir, as well as its balance between fruit and mineral flavours. In Germany, Riesling typically ripens between late September and late November, with late harvest grapes sometimes picked as late as January.

Traditionally, German Riesling is rarely blended with other varieties and usually fermented in neutral steel tanks or old oak barrels. However, some vintners, particularly from the Palatinate (Pfalz) and Baden, also use new oak aging. Warmer growing conditions in those regions tend to produce fuller-bodied wines with higher alcohol levels that can better accommodate new oak influence. When young, German Rieslings often show distinct fruit and mineral flavours, while with age (particularly after about ten years) they are considered to integrate and develop greater harmony.

Before the advent of temperature-controlled fermentation, winter cold in northern regions often halted fermentation, leaving wines with natural sugars and relatively low alcohol. In the Mosel region, these wines would be bottled in tall, tapered, green hock bottles, while in the Rhine region similar bottles were used in brown glass.

Harvest sugar levels are central to production in Germany, where the prädikat system classifies wines by must weight and sweetness. Equally important is the balance of acidity between the green-tasting malic acid and the more citrus-tasting tartaric acid. In cool years, some growers delay harvest into November in pursuit of higher ripeness and more citric taste.

Riesling is the preferred grape variety in the production of Deutscher Sekt, Germany's traditional sparkling wine. German Riesling covers a vast array of tastes from sweet to off-dry (feinherb or halbtrocken) to fully dry (trocken) with late harvest examples capable of producing rich dessert wines at the beerenauslese (BA) and trockenbeerenauslese (TBA) levels.

=== France ===
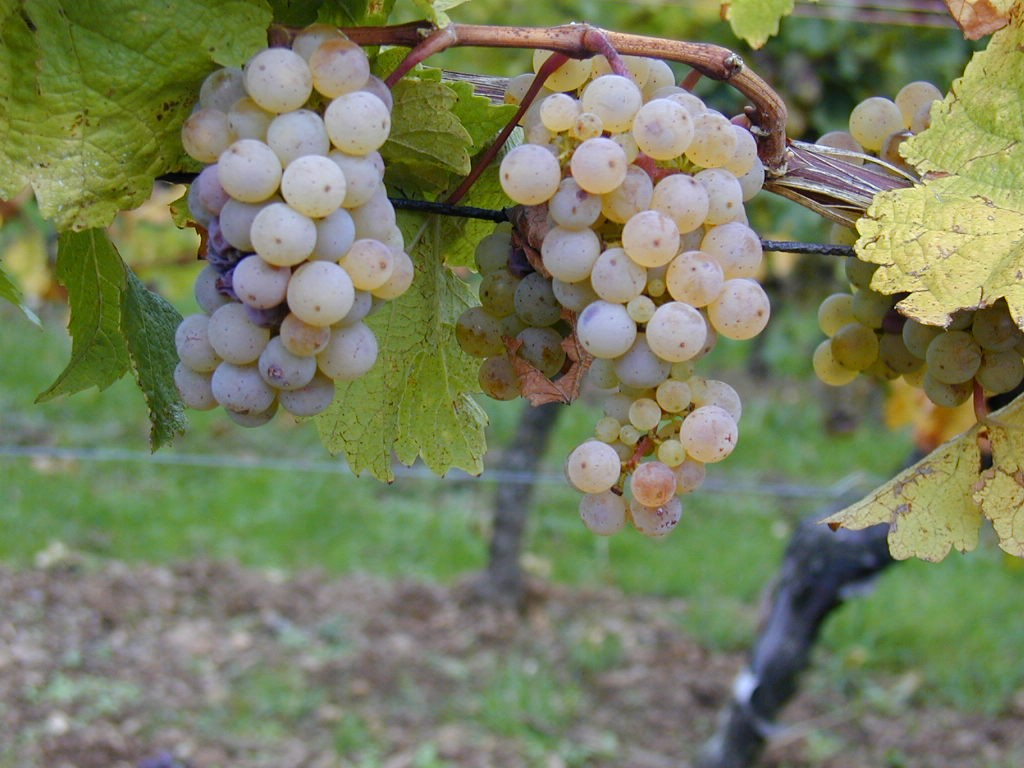
Riesling grapes growing in Alsace

Riesling was recorded in the Alsace as early as 1477, when its quality was praised by the Duke of Lorraine. Today, over a fifth of Alsace's vineyards are covered with Riesling vines, mostly in the Haut-Rhin district, with the varietal Riesling d'Alsace differing from neighboring German Riesling due to viticultural and winemaking factors. Soils in Alsace are often more calcareous, in contrast to slate-dominated soils of regions such as the Rheingau. Winemaking practices also diverge, with Alsatian producers generally favoring techniques resulting in higher alcohol levels (around 12%) and greater roundness due to longer time spent in neutral oak barrels or steel tanks. Unlike German wine law, Alsatian Rieslings can be chaptalized, a process in which the alcoholic content is increased through the addition of sugar to the must.

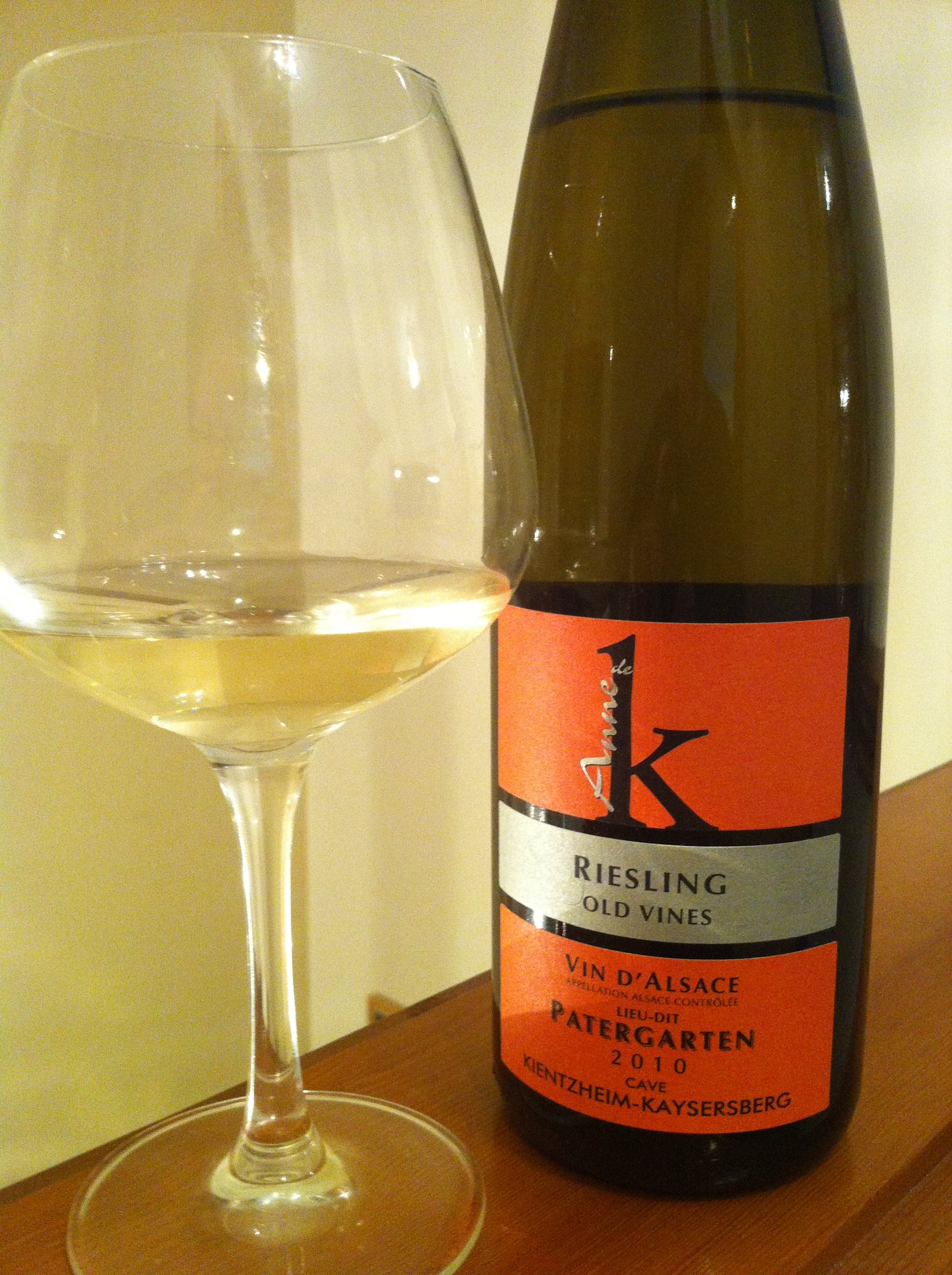
An Alsatian Riesling

In contrast to other Alsatian wines, Rieslings d'Alsace are usually not meant to be drunk young, but many are still best in the first years. Rieslings d'Alsace tend to be mostly very dry with a cleansing acidity. They are thick-bodied wines that coat the palate. These wines age exceptionally well with a quality vintage aging up to 20 years. This is beneficial since the flavours in an Alsace wine will often open up after three years, developing softer and fruitier flavours. Riesling is very suitable for the late harvest Vendange Tardive and the botrytized Sélection de Grains Nobles, with good acidity keeping up the sweetness of the wine.

Riesling is one of the grape varieties permitted for planting in Alsace grand cru sites, along with Muscat, Gewürztraminer and Pinot gris.

=== Australia and New Zealand ===
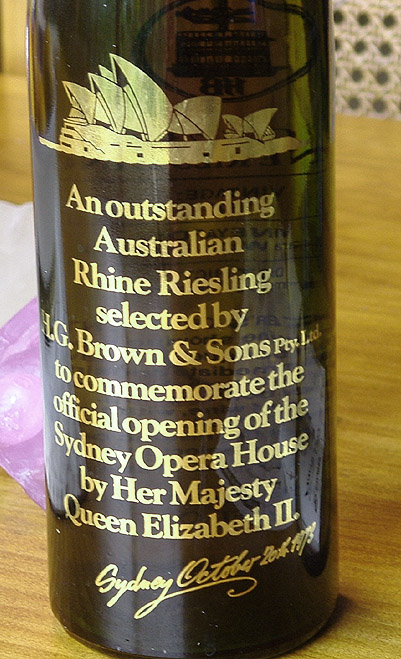
Gold lettering on collectible Sydney Opera House wine

In 1838 William Macarthur planted Riesling vines near Penrith in New South Wales. Riesling was the most planted white grape in Australia until the early 1990s when Chardonnay greatly increased in popularity. Riesling still flourishes in the Great Southern of Western Australia (in particular Mt Barker, Frankland River and Porongurup), and in South Australia in the Clare Valley, and particularly in the areas of Watervale and around Polish Hill River, and the cooler Eden Valley and High Eden. The warmer Australian climate produces thicker skinned grapes, sometimes seven times the thickness of German grown grapes. The grapes ripen in free draining soil composed of red soil over limestone and shale, producing a lean wine that, as it matures, produces toasty, honeycomb and lime aromas and flavors. It is common for Australian Rieslings to be fermented at low temperatures in stainless steel tanks with no oxidation of the wine, followed by earlier bottling.

Australian Rieslings are noted for their oily texture and citrus fruit flavors in their youth and a smooth balance of freshness and acid as they age. While fruit-forward descriptors such as lychee and pineapple are typically used to describe young Australian Rieslings, notes of kerosene and caramel become more apparent as Australian Riesling wines age. The botrytized Rieslings have immense levels of flavor concentrations that have been favorably compared to lemon marmalade.

Riesling was first planted in New Zealand in the 1970s and has flourished in the relatively cool climate of the Marlborough area and for late harvests in the Nelson region. In comparison to Australian Riesling, New Zealand produces lighter and more delicate wines that range from sweet to dry. Central Otago, the home of cool climate wines, has recently emerged as another area producing terroir driven Rieslings.

=== Austria ===
Riesling is the second leading white grape varietal after the indigenous Grüner Veltliner. Austrian Riesling is generally thick bodied, coating the palate and producing a strong clarity of flavour coupled with a mouthwatering aroma. A particular Austrian Riesling trademark is a long finish that includes hints of white pepper. It flourishes in the cool climate and free-draining granite and mica soil of the Wachau region where Austrian wine laws allow for irrigation. With levels normally around 13% it has a relatively high alcohol content for Riesling and is generally at its peak after 5 years. Austrian Riesling is not known for its sweetness and is mostly dry with very few grapes affected by botrytis.

=== United States ===
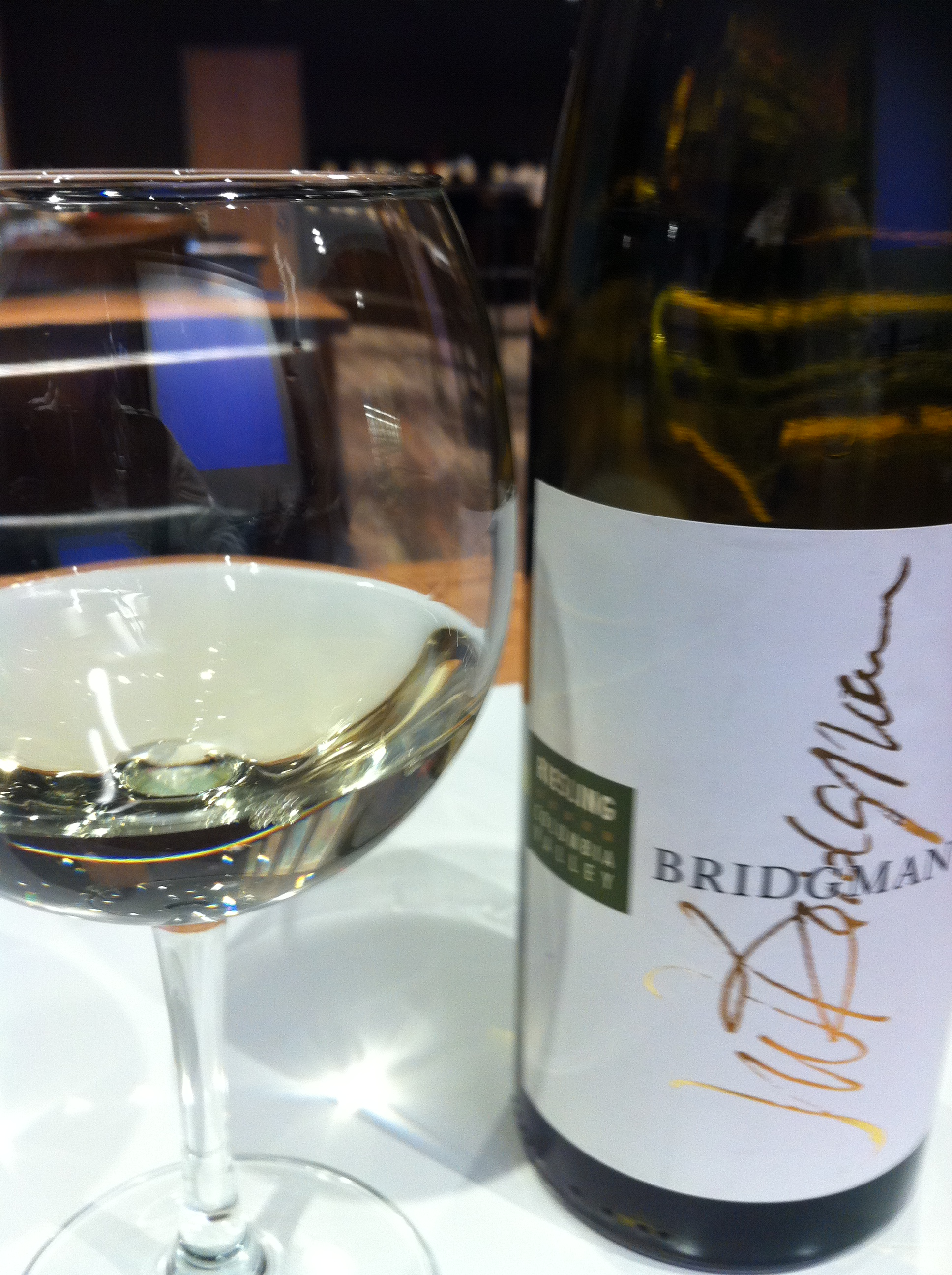
A Riesling from the Columbia Valley AVA of Washington State

In the late nineteenth century, German immigrants brought with them Riesling vines, borrowing the name of Schloss Johannisberg to mark the plants' origin. "Johannisberg Riesling" became a semi-generic name for Riesling until an agreement between the U.S. and EU prohibited its use in 2006. New York, particularly in the Finger Lakes region, was one of the earliest U.S. producers of Riesling. Plantings started to appear in California by 1857 and followed in Washington State in 1871.

New York Riesling generally has a characteristic effervescent light body with a similarly light, mellow flavor. The wine can be dynamic though rarely robust, and ranges from dry to sweet. New York is also a notable producer of Riesling-based ice wine, although a large majority of New York Ice Wine is made from Vidal blanc and Vignoles.

In California, Riesling lags far behind Chardonnay in popularity and is not as commonly planted. A notable exception is the growing development of high quality Late Harvest dessert wines. So far, the Late Harvest wines most successfully produced are in the Anderson and Alexander Valleys where the weather is more likely to encourage the needed botrytis to develop. The Riesling that does come out of California tends to be softer, fuller, and having more diverse flavours than a "typical" German Riesling.

In the Pacific Northwest, there is a stark contrast in Riesling production. Although Oregon was once viewed as a promising destination for the grape, Burgundy-style wines came to dominate, while in Washington, large producers such as Chateau Ste. Michelle spearheaded Riesling's growth. Chateau Ste. Michille championed German styles and partnered with well-known German firm Dr. Ernest Loosen to create specialty wines such as the Eroica brand. With annual productions of over 2,000,000 cases a year, Chateau Ste. Michelle is the worldwide leader in the production of Riesling wines by volume. In 2007 Pacific Rim Winemakers, another Pacific Northwest winery and owned by Randall Grahm of Bonny Doon, has built the first wine facility in Red Mountain AVA dedicated completely to Riesling production. Riesling from this area ranges from dry to sweet, and has a crisp lightness that bodes well for easy drinking. Often there will be an easily detectable peach and mineral complex

In Michigan, whose Old Mission Peninsula and Leelanau Peninsula AVAs (near Traverse City) are known for their ice wine, Riesling is a fairly common variety, in part on account of its suitability for that purpose.

Riesling is grown in other regions as well, including colder parts of relatively warm states such as Oklahoma (where it has even been made into an eiswein) and Texas.

Riesling is also grown throughout all the regions in Ohio and is produced and sold at award-winning wineries across the state.

=== Canada ===
In Ontario, Riesling is commonly used for icewine, where the wine is noted for its breadth and complexity. Niagara is a major producer of ice wine in general, putting it neck-and-neck with Germany. As Riesling grapes are harvested later, the total concentration of aromatic compounds present in the wine generally decreases, therefore decreasing the wine's complexity. Late Harvest wines and some sparkling wines are produced with Riesling in Niagara but it is table wines from dry to off-dry that hold the largest share of production. The climate of the region is typically quite warm in the summertime, which adds a layer of richness in the wines. The founder of St. Urbanshoff in the Mosel, Herman Weiss, was an early pioneer in Niagara's modern viticulture, selling his strain of Mosel clone Riesling to many producers in west Niagara (these vines are well over 20 years old now). This clone and Niagara's summer heat make for uniquely bright wines and often show up in interesting dry styled versions. Many producers and wine critics will argue that Niagara's best offerings come from the Niagara Escarpment region, which encompasses the Short Hills Bench, 20 Mile Bench, and Beamsville Bench.

In British Columbia, Riesling is commonly grown for use in icewine, table wine, and sekt-style sparkling wines, a notable example of which is Cipes Brut.

In Nova Scotia, particularly in the Annapolis Valley region, Riesling is showing significant promise, being shaped by the warm summer days with cool nights and the extension of the growing season that is being observed. The Maritime climate combined with glacial soils contribute to the interesting expressions that are showing.

=== Other regions ===
Riesling is also widely grown in Luxembourg (where it represents some 12% of the vineyard), Hungary, Italy, particularly Friuli-Venezia Giulia, Croatia, South Africa, Chile and Central Europe, particularly Romania and Moldova, Serbia, Kazakhstan and Uzbekistan.

== Production ==
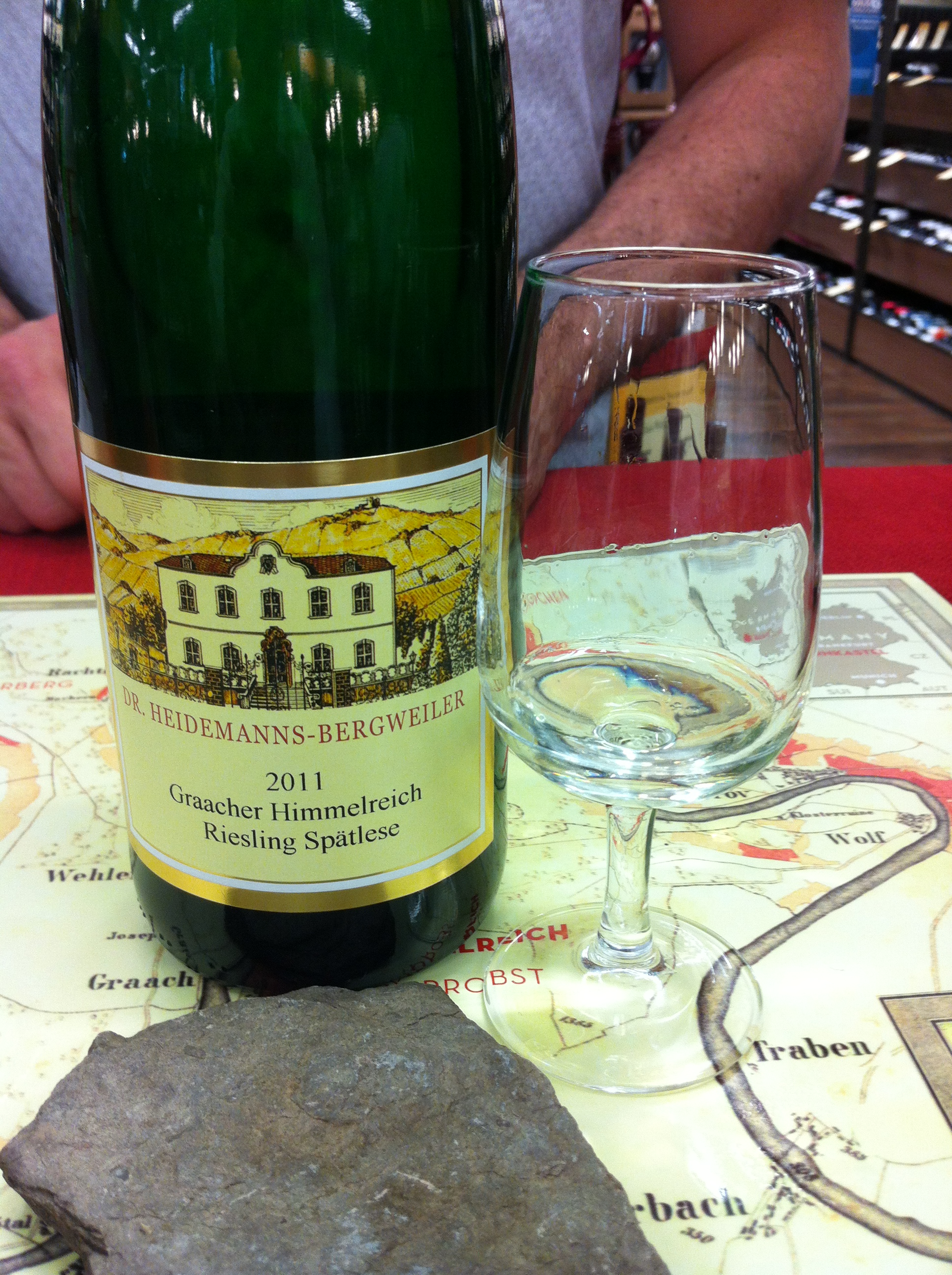
A German Spätlese-level Riesling from the Mosel

In wine making, the delicate nature of the Riesling grape requires special handling during harvesting to avoid crushing or bruising the skin. Without this care, the broken skins could leak tannin into the juice, giving a markedly coarse taste and throwing off balance the Riesling's range of flavors and aromas.

A wine that is best at its "freshest" states, the grapes and juice may be chilled often throughout the vinification process. Once, right after picking to preserve the grapes' more delicate flavours. Second, after it has been processed through a bladder press and right before fermentation. During fermentation, the wine is cooled in temperature controlled stainless steel fermentation tanks kept between 10 and 18 °C (50 and 64 °F). This differs from red wines that normally ferment at 24 to 29 °C (75 to 84 °F)

Unlike Chardonnay, most Riesling do not undergo malolactic fermentation. This helps preserve the tart, acidic characteristic of the wine that gives Riesling its "thirst-quenching" quality. (Producers of Sauvignon blanc and Pinot grigio often avoid malolactic fermentation for the same reason.) Riesling is often put through a process of cold stabilization, where the wine is stored just above its freezing point. The wine is kept at this temperature until much of the tartaric acid has crystallized and precipitated out of the wine. This helps prevent crystallization of the acid (often called "wine diamonds") in the bottle. After this, the wine is normally filtered again to remove any remaining yeast or impurities.

In viticulture, the two main components in growing Riesling grapes are to keep it "Long & Low" meaning that the ideal situation for Riesling is a climate that allows for a long, slow ripening and proper pruning to keep the yield low and the flavor concentrated.

== With food ==
Riesling is a versatile wine for pairing with food, because of its balance of sugar and acidity. It can be paired with white fish or pork, and is one of the few wines that can stand up to the stronger flavours and spices of Thai and Chinese cuisine. A Riesling's typical aromas are of flowers, tropical fruits, and mineral stone (such as slate or quartz), although, with time, the wine acquires a petrol note as mentioned above.

Riesling is almost never fermented or aged in new oak (although large old oak barrels are often used to store and stabilize Riesling-based wines in Germany and Alsace). This means that Riesling tends to be lighter weight and therefore suitable to a wider range of foods. The sharp acidity/sweetness in Rieslings can serve as a good balance to foods that have a high salt content. In Germany, cabbage is sometimes cooked with Riesling to reduce the vegetable's smell.

As with other white wines, dry Riesling is generally served at a cool 11 °C (52 °F). Sweeter Rieslings are often served warmer.

== Clones ==
There exists a large number of commercial clones of Riesling, with slightly different properties. In Germany, approximately 60 clones are allowed, and the most famous of these have been propagated from vines in the vineyards of Schloss Johannisberg. Most other countries have sourced their Riesling clones directly from Germany, but they are sometimes propagated under different designations.

== Red Riesling ==
A very rare version of Riesling that has recently received more attention is Red Riesling (Roter Riesling). As the name suggests, this is a red-skinned clone of Riesling (a skin color commonly found for, e.g., Gewürztraminer), but not a dark-skinned clone, i.e., it is still a white wine grape. It is considered a mutation of White Riesling, but some experts have suggested the opposite relationship, i.e., that Red Riesling could be the forerunner of White Riesling. Small amounts of Red Riesling are grown in Germany and Austria. In 2006, the Rheingau winery Fritz Allendorf planted what has been claimed to be the first commercial amounts of Red Riesling. To confuse matters, "Red Riesling" has also been used as a synonym for red-skinned Traminer grapes (such as the Savagnin rose of Klevener de Heiligenstein) and the obscure variety Hanns, which is a seed plant of Roter Veltliner. Roter Riesling has nothing to do with Schwarzriesling.

== Crosses ==
In the late 19th century, German horticulturalists devoted many efforts to develop new Riesling hybrids that would create a more flexible, less temperamental grape that could still retain some of the elegant characteristics of Riesling. The most notable is the Müller-Thurgau developed in the Geisenheim Grape Breeding Institute in 1882, which is a cross of Riesling and Madeleine Royale (although long believed to be Riesling x Silvaner). Other Riesling/Silvaner crosses include the Palatinate regional favorite Scheurebe and Rieslaner. Kerner, a cross between Riesling and the red wine grape Trollinger is a high-quality cross that has recently eclipsed Riesling in plantings.

Crossings with Riesling as the first parent include Arnsburger, Ehrenfelser, Floricica, Manzoni bianco and Müller Thurgau. Those with Riesling as the second parent include Arnsburger, Kerner and Rieslaner.

== Naming ==
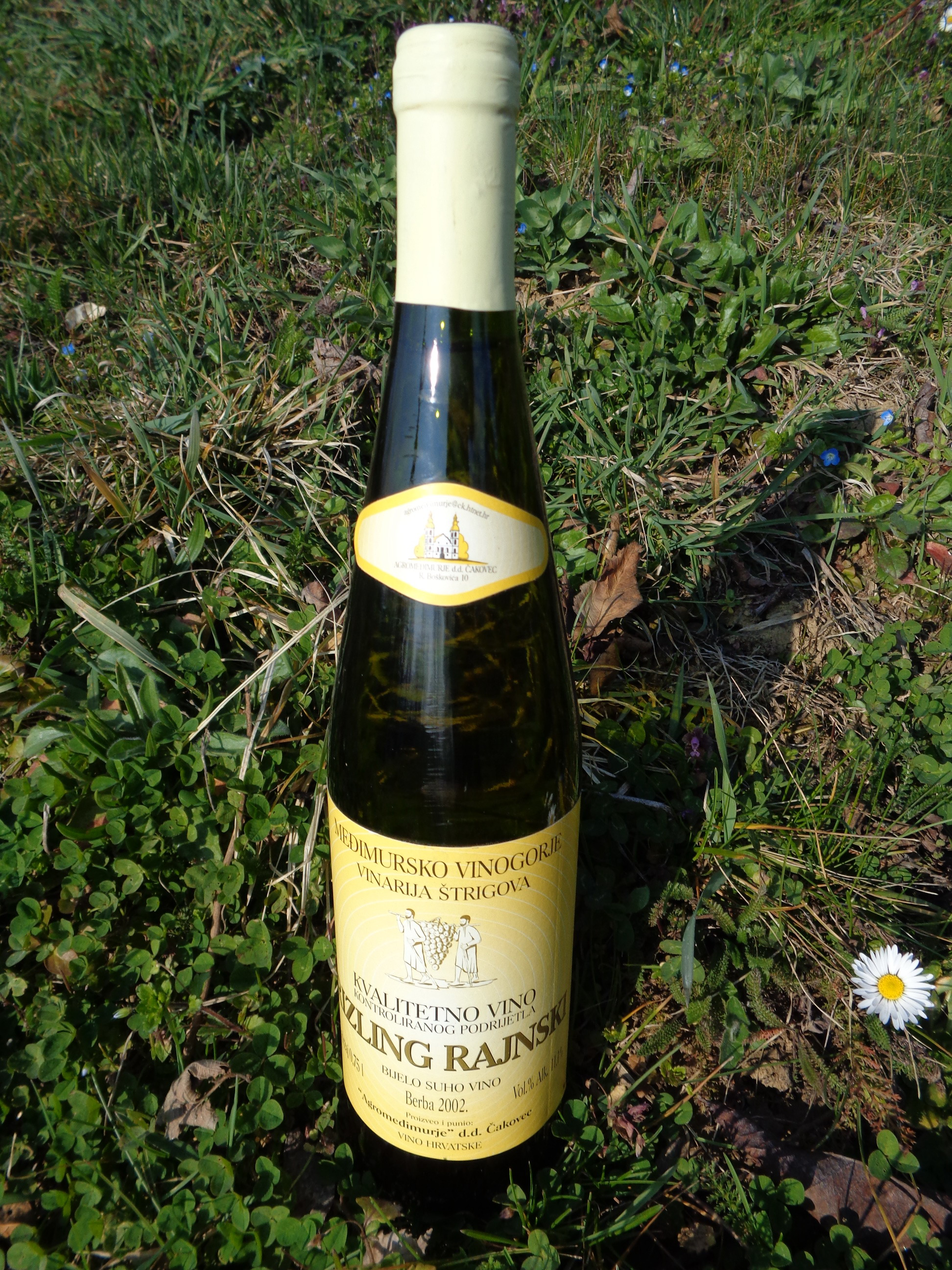
A bottle of Riesling of Rhein/Rizling rajnski from Northern Croatia

Many grapes that incorporate the name Riesling are not true Riesling. For example:

- Welschriesling is an unrelated variety, which is common in Austria, Croatia, Czech Republic, Hungary, and Romania, and that may also be labelled as Riesling Italico, Welsch Rizling, Olasz Rizling or Laski Rizling.
- Schwarzriesling (Black Riesling) is the German name for Pinot Meunier, a grape used in Champagne, but which is also grown in Southern Germany.
- Cape Riesling is the South African name for the French grape Crouchen.
- Gray Riesling is actually Trousseau gris, a white mutant of the Bastardo port wine grape.
- White Riesling is the 'real' Riesling, which is also called Johannisberg Riesling (named after the famed Schloss Johannisberg) and Rhine Riesling (= Riesling Renano in Italy, occasionally Rheinriesling in Austria).

== See also ==
- German wine labels
- International variety
