= Eden Valley wine region =

Wine region in South Australia

Eden Valley
- Wine region
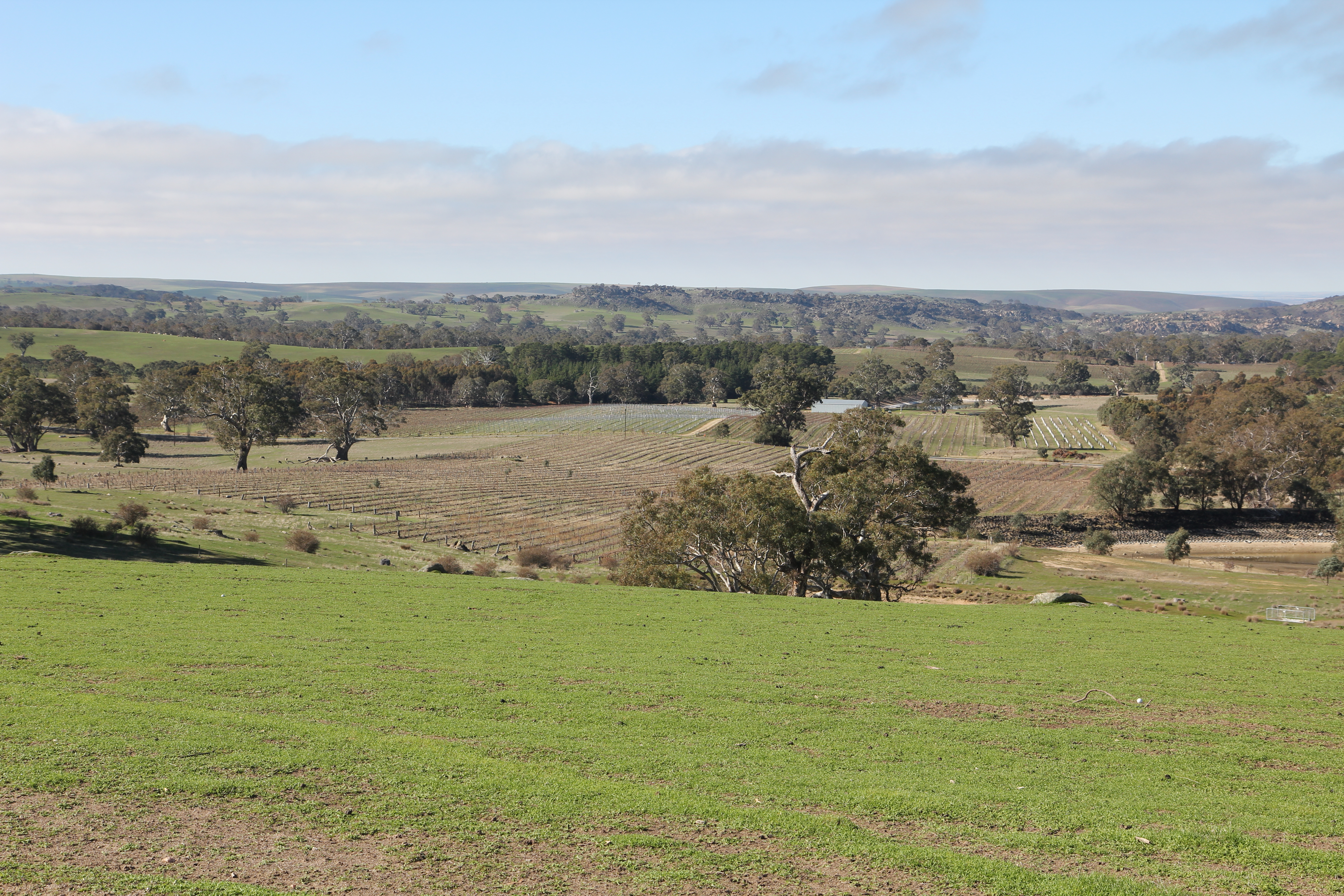
- Vineyards in the Eden Valley, South Australia
- Type: Australian Geographical Indication
- Year established: 1997
- Years of wine industry: since 1847
- Country: Australia
- Part of: Barossa zone
- Other regions in Barossa zone: Barossa Valley
- Sub-regions: High Eden
- Location: South Australia
- Climate region: ’I’
- Heat units: 1390
- Precipitation (annual average): 280 mm (11 in)
- Size of planted vineyards: 2,264 ha (5,590 acres)
- Grapes produced: 6,460 tonnes (6,360 long tons; 7,120 short tons)
- Varietals produced: Shiraz, Riesling, Cabernet Sauvignon, Chardonnay
- No. of wineries: at least 36
- Comments: Data as of 2014

Eden Valley wine region is a wine region located in South Australia immediately north of the capital city of Adelaide which covers an area in the Mount Lofty Ranges extending from Truro in the north to just south of Springton in the south. The region received appellation as an Australian Geographical Indication in 1997 and as of 2014, it is represented by at least 36 wineries.

== Extent and appellation ==
Eden Valley wine region covers an area in the Mount Lofty Ranges extending from Truro in the north to just south of Springton in the south. The region is bordered by the Barossa Valley wine region to the west and by the Adelaide Hills wine region to the south. The Eden Valley wine region was registered as an Australian Geographical Indication on 15 August 1997. The Eden Valley wine region includes a sub-region called High Eden.

== Grapes and wine ==
As of 2014, the most common plantings in the Eden Valley wine region within a total planted area of 2,264 ha (5,590 acres) was reported as being Shiraz (31.4%) followed by Riesling (24.1%), Cabernet Sauvignon (13.4%) and Chardonnay (11.7%). Alternatively, red wine varietals account for 53.8% of plantings while white wines varietals account for 45.5% of plantings. The 2014 vintage is reported as consisting of 2,601 tonnes (2,560 long tons; 2,867 short tons) red grapes crushed valued at A$4,897,755 and 3,858 tonnes (3,797 long tons; 4,253 short tons) white grapes crushed valued at $4,215,543. As of 2014, the region is reported as containing at least 36 wineries.

== See also ==
- South Australian wine
- List of wineries in the Eden Valley

== Citations and references ==
=== References ===
- Phylloxera and Grape Industry Board of SA (PGIBSA) (2014), "Australian regional winegrape crush survey online" (PDF), South Australian Winegrape Utilisation and Pricing Surveys, Phylloxera and Grape Industry Board of SA, ISSN 1442-6048, archived from the original (PDF) on 6 November 2014
