= Mount Crawford, South Australia =

Mount Crawford South Australia
- Coordinates: 34°42′54″S 138°57′07″E
- Population: 138 (SAL 2021)
- Postcode(s): 5351
- LGA(s): Barossa Council; Adelaide Hills Council
- State electorate(s): Schubert
- Federal division(s): Mayo
Localities around Mount Crawford:
Williamstown	Pewsey Vale	Flaxman Valley
Kersbrook	Mount Crawford	Springton
Forreston	Cromer	Mount Pleasant

Mount Crawford is a locality in the Mount Lofty Ranges of South Australia. It is named after the mountain of the same name in its boundaries, also known as Teetaka.

The locality of Mount Crawford is crossed by Warren Road (route B34 between Williamstown and Birdwood) and edged by Route B35 where it branches from that road towards Mount Pleasant. The space between the two roads is Cromer, but both sides of the Y junction are Mount Crawford. The Warren Conservation Park and south bank of Warren Reservoir are also in Mount Crawford. The South Para River rises in Mount Crawford, then flows along the northern boundary of the locality, through the Warren Reservoir. The Heysen Trail (a long-distance hiking trail) also crosses Mount Crawford.

Mount Crawford is located within the local government areas of the Adelaide Hills Council and the Barossa Council. It is within the boundaries of the Adelaide Hills wine region.

In 1846, Mount Crawford's population was recorded as 530; by 1855 it was down to 397. According to the Australian Bureau of Statistics, there were 127 people living there in 2016.

== Climate ==
Climate data for Mount Crawford, elevation 525 m (1,722 ft), (1994–2025 normals, extremes 1991–present)
Month	Jan	Feb	Mar	Apr	May	Jun	Jul	Aug	Sep	Oct	Nov	Dec	Year
Record high °C (°F)	43.7 (110.7)	41.6 (106.9)	37.9 (100.2)	34.8 (94.6)	26.8 (80.2)	23.0 (73.4)	20.3 (68.5)	24.9 (76.8)	29.8 (85.6)	34.5 (94.1)	39.7 (103.5)	42.0 (107.6)	43.7 (110.7)
Mean daily maximum °C (°F)	27.7 (81.9)	27.0 (80.6)	23.6 (74.5)	19.3 (66.7)	14.9 (58.8)	11.7 (53.1)	11.0 (51.8)	12.5 (54.5)	15.2 (59.4)	18.4 (65.1)	22.3 (72.1)	25.2 (77.4)	19.1 (66.4)
Mean daily minimum °C (°F)	14.0 (57.2)	14.0 (57.2)	12.3 (54.1)	10.5 (50.9)	8.6 (47.5)	6.5 (43.7)	5.9 (42.6)	6.2 (43.2)	7.3 (45.1)	8.5 (47.3)	10.3 (50.5)	12.1 (53.8)	9.7 (49.5)
Record low °C (°F)	6.1 (43.0)	5.5 (41.9)	4.2 (39.6)	2.1 (35.8)	1.1 (34.0)	0.1 (32.2)	0.2 (32.4)	−0.6 (30.9)	0.0 (32.0)	0.8 (33.4)	2.0 (35.6)	4.5 (40.1)	−0.6 (30.9)
Average precipitation mm (inches)	24.5 (0.96)	24.1 (0.95)	25.9 (1.02)	42.4 (1.67)	69.2 (2.72)	88.2 (3.47)	92.9 (3.66)	86.8 (3.42)	70.3 (2.77)	48.0 (1.89)	38.4 (1.51)	32.1 (1.26)	643.4 (25.33)
Average precipitation days (≥ 0.2 mm)	5.1	4.9	8.5	11.0	15.1	17.2	18.2	17.3	16.2	12.2	9.9	8.0	143.6
Average afternoon relative humidity (%)	36	38	42	52	67	77	77	70	64	55	47	39	55
Source: Australian Bureau of Meteorology (humidity 1994–2010)
