= Corybas × miscellus =

Hybrid helmet orchid

Scientific classification
- Kingdom: Plantae
- Clade: Tracheophytes
- Clade: Angiosperms
- Clade: Monocots
- Order: Asparagales
- Family: Orchidaceae
- Subfamily: Orchidoideae
- Tribe: Diurideae
- Genus: Corybas
- Species: C. × miscellus

Binomial name
- Corybas × miscellus D.L.Jones

Synonyms
- Corybas × miscella D.L.Jones; Corysanthes × miscellus (D.L.Jones) D.L.Jones & M.A.Clem.

Species of orchid

Corybas × miscellus, commonly known as the hybrid helmet orchid, is a hybrid species of terrestrial orchid endemic to South Australia and a very small area in far western Victoria. It has a heart-shaped to more or less round leaf and a single reddish purple flower with greyish translucent areas. It is a natural hybrid between C. diemenicus and C. incurvus and shares the characteristics of the parent species.

== Description ==
Corybas × miscellus is a terrestrial, perennial, deciduous, herb which forms colonies. It has an egg-shaped, heart-shaped or almost round leaf 18–40 mm (0.7–2 in) long and 20–40 mm (0.8–2 in) wide. The leaf is dark green on the upper surface and silvery green on the lower side. The single flower is more or less erect, bright reddish purple with greyish translucent areas, 13–15 mm (0.5–0.6 in) long and 14–18 mm (0.6–0.7 in) wide. The dorsal sepal is mostly transparent grey with reddish purple streaks, 20–23 mm (0.8–0.9 in) long and 11–13 mm (0.43–0.51 in) wide. It is erect near its base then curves forward, protruding over the labellum. The lateral sepals and petals are linear, about 3 mm (0.12 in) long, 0.5 mm (0.02 in) wide and tapered. The labellum is longer than the dorsal sepal and forms a tube 5–6 mm (0.20–0.24 in) long near its base, before curving and flattening into a concave dish shape, 10–14 mm (0.4–0.6 in) long and 14–18 mm (0.6–0.7 in) wide. The upper part of the labellum is reddish with darker veins except for a white mound in the centre and many short red teeth around the edges. Flowering occurs in August and September.

== Taxonomy ==
Corybas × miscellus was first formally described in 1991 by David Jones from a specimen collected near the Barossa Reservoir and the description was published in Australian Orchid Research. The specific epithet (miscellus) is a Latin word meaning "mixed", referring to the hybrid origin of this species.

In 2002, David Jones and Mark Clements proposed splitting Corybas into smaller genera and placing this species into Corysanthes but the change has not been widely accepted.

== Distribution and habitat ==
The hybrid helmet orchid grows in plantations of the introduced Pinus radiata in the Mount Lofty Ranges. There is also a population growing in woodland near Edenhope in far western Victoria.
