= Barossa Dam =

Dam and reservoir in Adelaide, South Australia

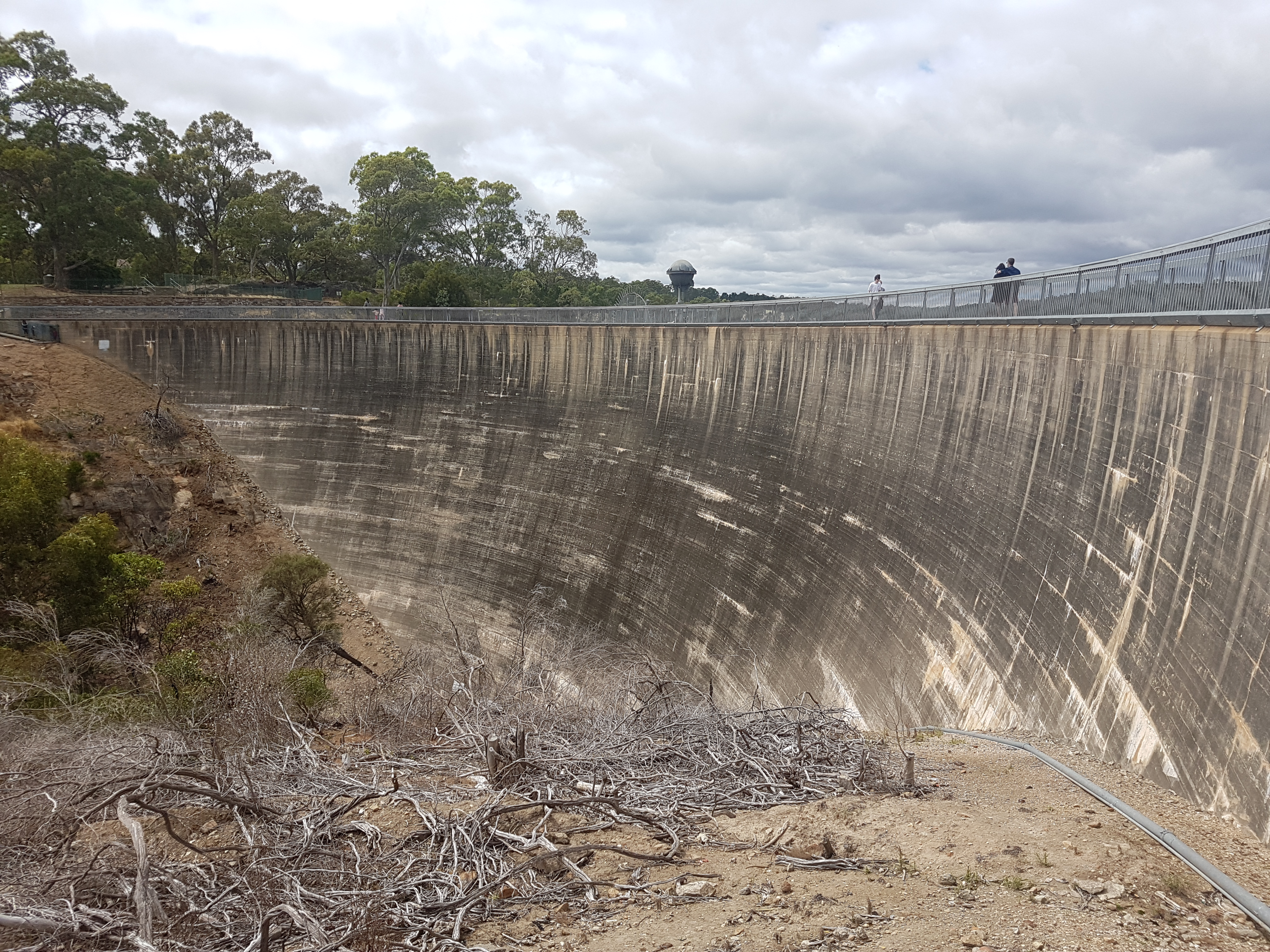
- The downriver side of the dam wall, in 2017

- Location of the dam in South Australia
- Country: Australia
- Location: Williamstown, South Australia
- Coordinates: 34°38′44″S 138°50′50″E
- Purpose: Water supply
- Status: Operational
- Construction began: 1899
- Opening date: 1902
- Construction cost: A£170,000
- Built by: Engineering and Water Supply Department
- Owner: Government of South Australia
- Operator: SA Water

Dam and spillways
- Type of dam: Arch dam
- Impounds: Yettie Creek
- Height: 38 m (125 ft)
- Length: 144 m (472 ft)
- Dam volume: 12×10^{3} m^{3} (420×10^{3} cu ft)
- Spillway type: Uncontrolled

Reservoir
- Creates: Barossa Reservoir
- Total capacity: 4,515 ML (3,660 acre⋅ft)
- Catchment area: 7 km^{2} (2.7 sq mi)
- Surface area: 6.2 ha (15 acres)
- Normal elevation: 221 m (725 ft) AHD
- Website sawater.com.au

South Australian Heritage Register
- Official name: Whispering Wall, Barossa Reservoir
- Type: Utilities - Reservoir
- Criteria: a., f.
- Designated: 8 July 1999
- Reference no.: 16929

The Barossa Dam is an arch dam across Yettie Creek, located in Williamstown, South Australia, Australia. Completed in 1902, the resultant reservoir, the Barossa Reservoir, was constructed for the supply potable water to Gawler and other northern country areas. The dam wall was added to the South Australian Heritage Register on 8 July 1999.

== Features ==
The dam was built between 1899 and 1902 at a cost of almost A£170,000. The thin arch of the dam retaining wall, curved against the pressure of the water, was an innovation considered radical, and attracted the Reservoir international attention. The dam was hailed as an engineering marvel, and with the dam wall rising to a height of 38 metres (125 ft), it was, at the time of its completion, the highest dam wall in Australia. The dam was featured in the Scientific American and caused the American Engineers News to remark that its "boldness of design deserves to rank with the most famous dams in the world". The dam is notable for its parabola effect, where a voice can be heard clearly from one side to the other – over 140 metres (460 ft), end to end. This unusual acoustic phenomenon is a popular tourist attraction, and earned the dam the title "Whispering Wall" (see Whispering gallery). During construction large stones were used in the wall to save concrete and tram rails were used to reinforce the upper section.

The dam wall is 38 metres (125 ft) high and 144 metres (472 ft) long. When full, the reservoir has capacity of 4,515 megalitres (3,660 acre⋅ft) and covers 12.7 hectares (31 acres), draw from a relatively-small catchment area of 7 square kilometres (2.7 sq mi).

The Barossa Reservoir was formed by damming the Yettie Creek gorge in the northern Mount Lofty Ranges, a feat that took over 400 workers. The water flows through a two-kilometre (one-mile) tunnel, that was carved by workers on horse, from the South Para River and Reservoir, and is supplemented by the Warren Reservoir and the River Murray. In addition to Gawler and country, a filtration plant constructed in 1982 allows the reservoir to supply the suburbs of Munno Para and Elizabeth.

The dam wall was added to the South Australian Heritage Register in 1999; and the dam's vegetated surrounds are also protected. Aside from its acoustic attraction, the Whispering Wall offers great views of both the Barossa Reservoir and the surrounding, well-preserved natural bounty. The area abounds in thick scrub, tall red gums, and pines, and a flourishing bird and animal life. It is a popular destination for picnics and bird-watching.

In 2008, the engineering heritage of the dam wall was recognised by the installation of a marker provided by the Engineers Australia's Engineering Heritage Recognition Program.

== Incidents ==
On 21 April 2021, a man jumped from the wall with his 9-month-old daughter strapped to him. Upon arrival of medical assistance, the man was pronounced dead and the child died later at the scene. The incident was deemed a murder-suicide and witnesses testified that the man jumped, as opposed to falling. It was reported that there was history of domestic violence between the child's parents. As of 22 November 2024, a coronial inquest was ongoing.

== Gallery ==
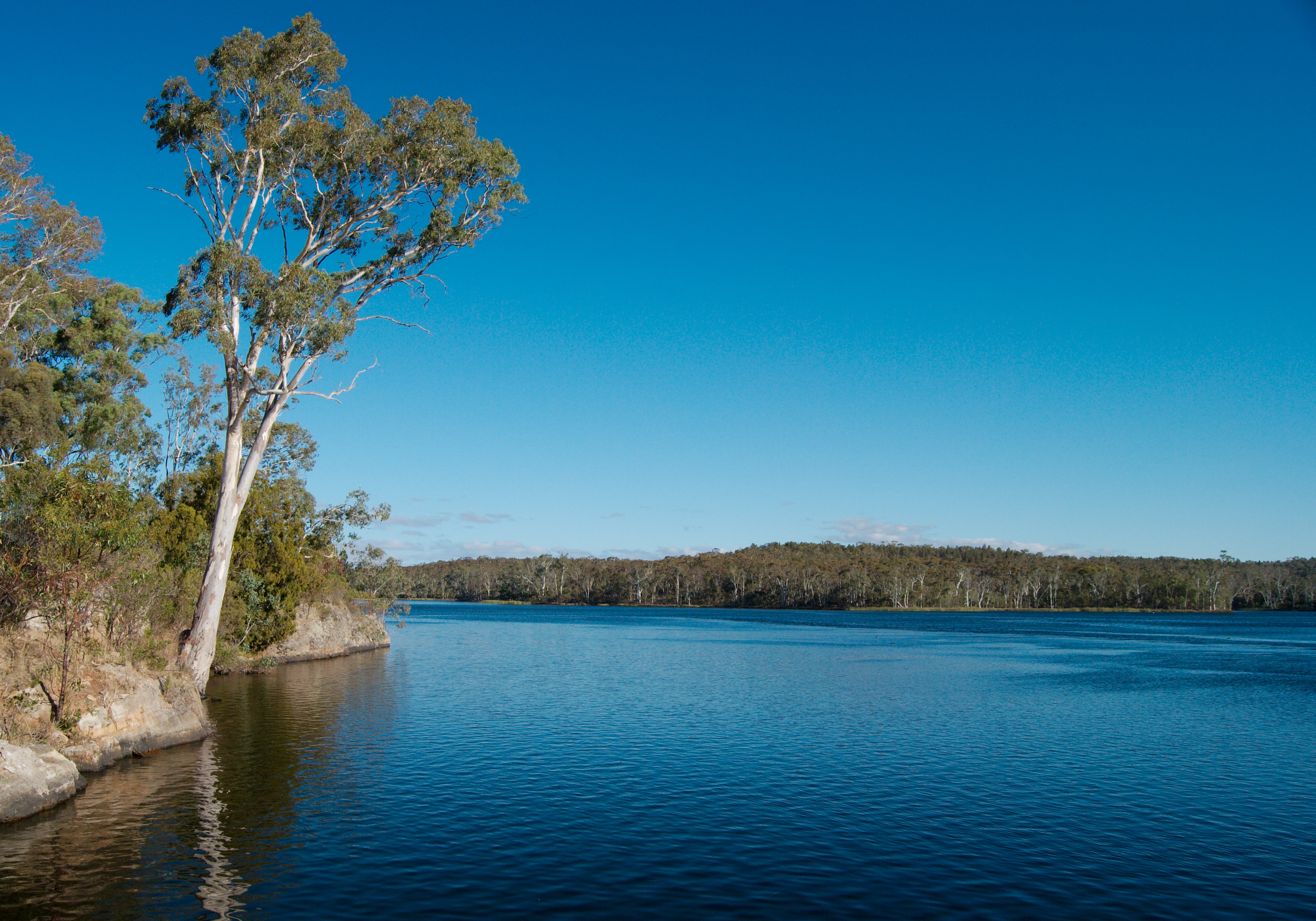
The reservoir, viewed from the dam wall

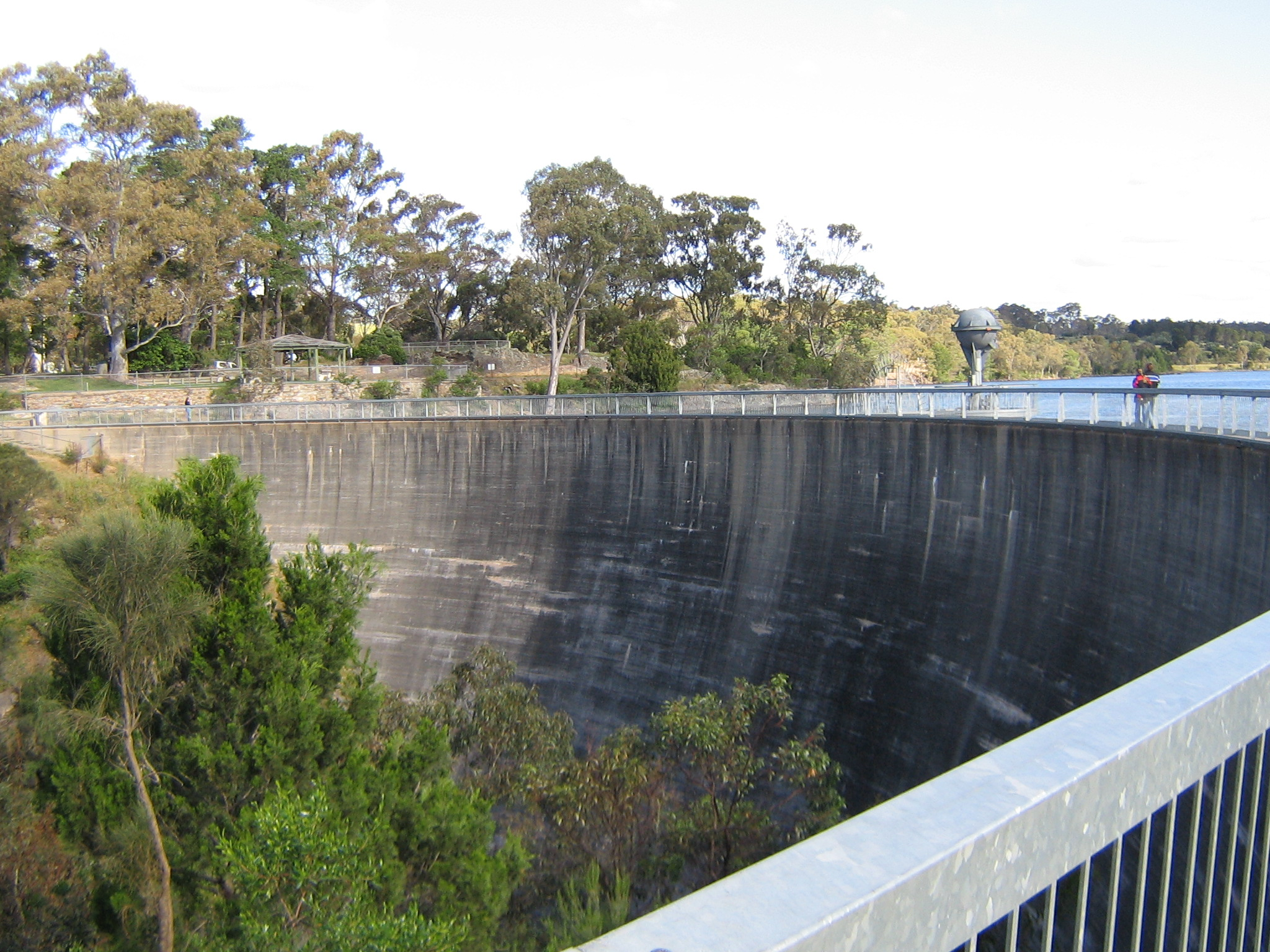
The dam wall can carry sounds clearly over 140 m (460 ft)

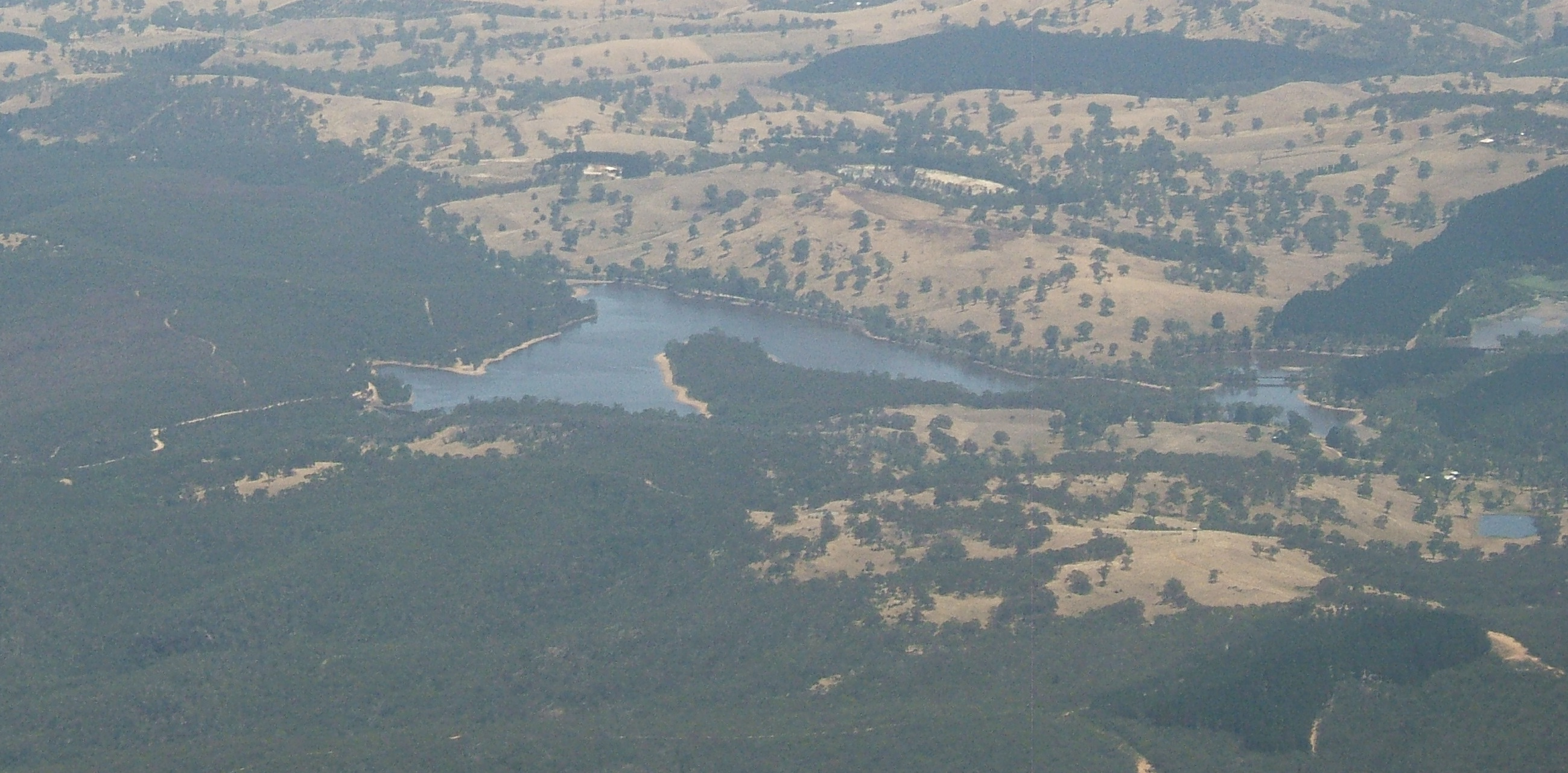
The Reservoir, viewed from the air

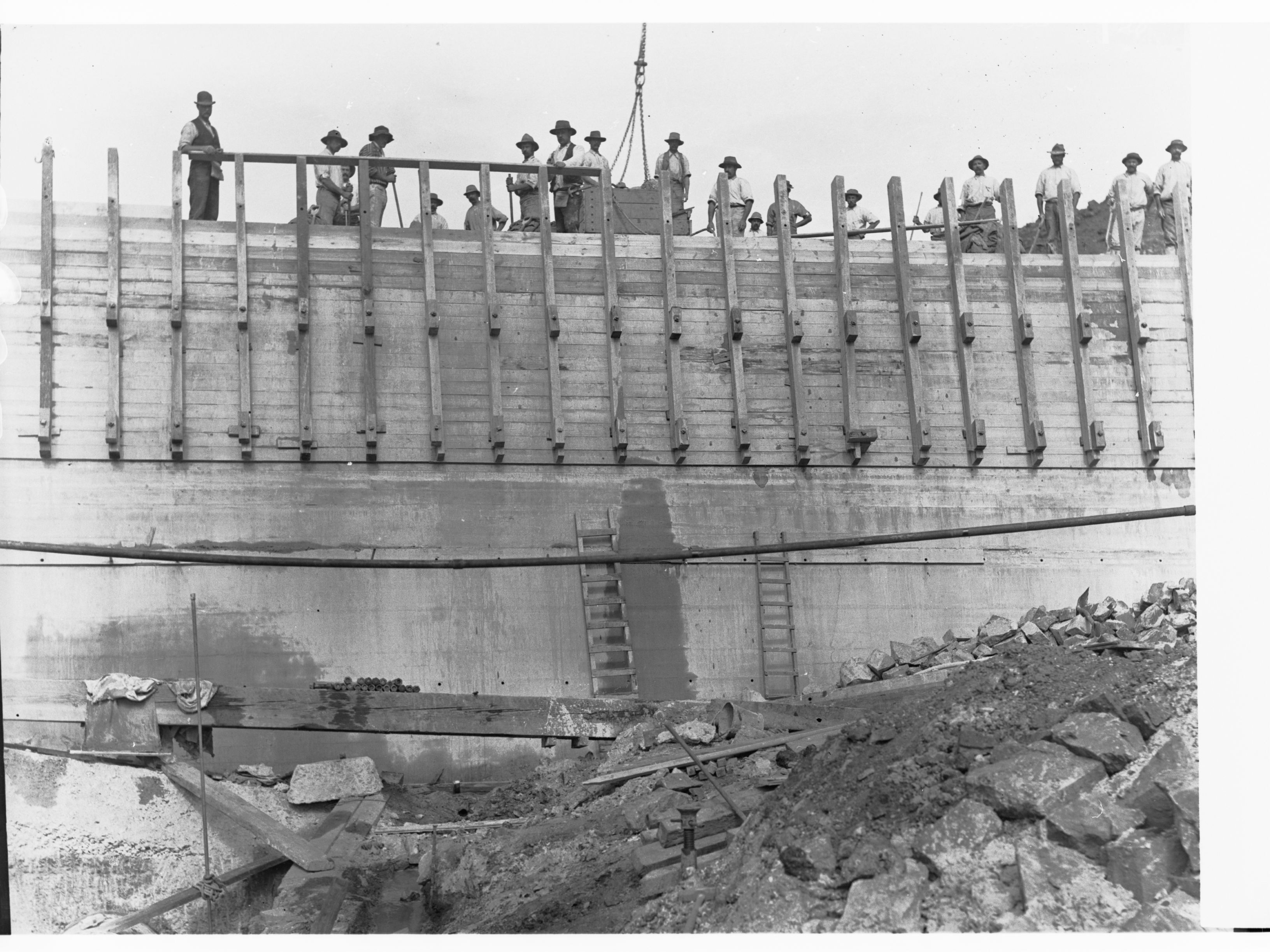
The dam wall under construction, c. 1905

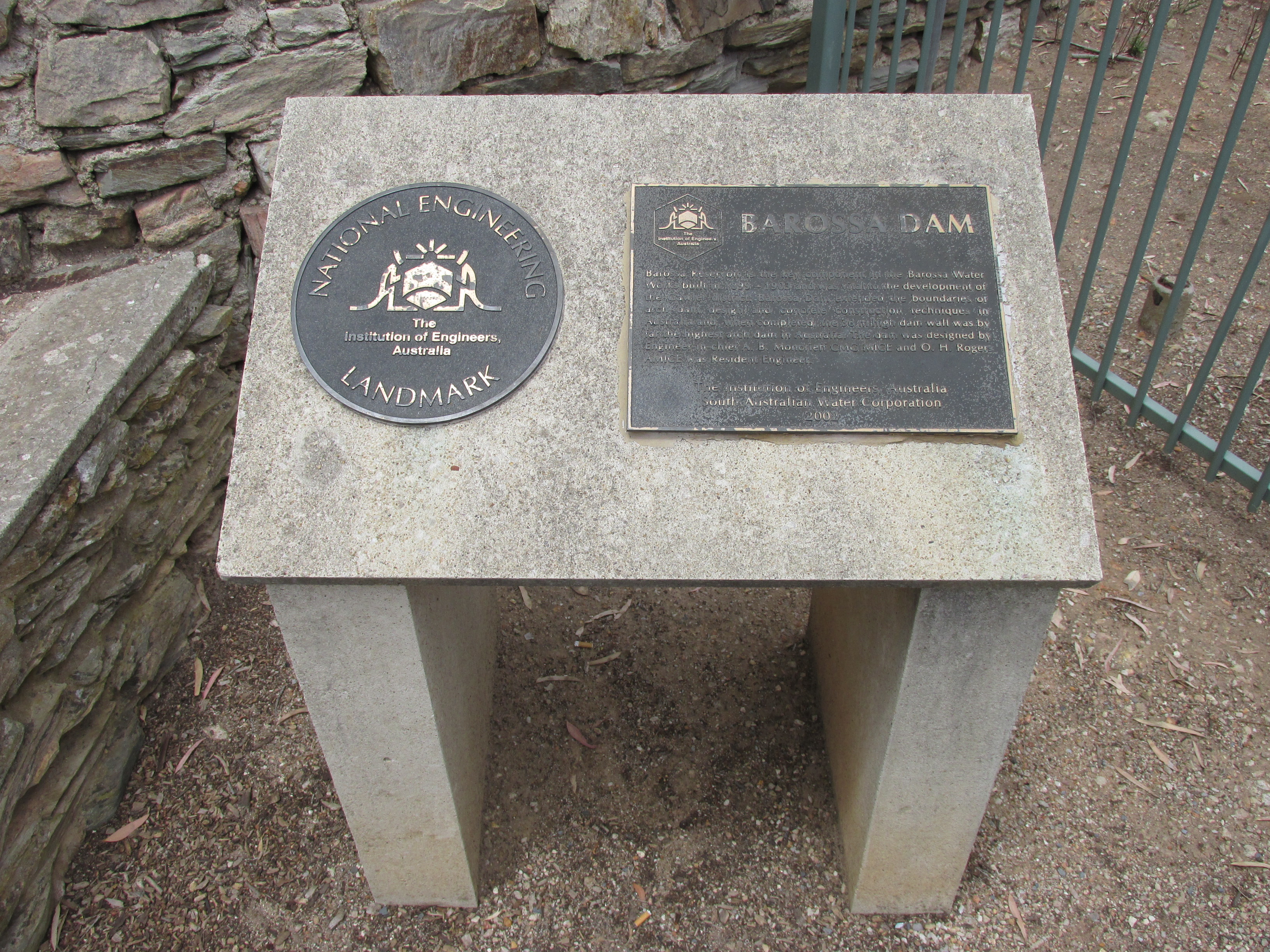
Engineering Heritage marker

== See also ==
- List of reservoirs and dams in South Australia
