= Hibbertia glebosa =

Scientific classification
- Kingdom: Plantae
- Clade: Tracheophytes
- Clade: Angiosperms
- Clade: Eudicots
- Order: Dilleniales
- Family: Dilleniaceae
- Genus: Hibbertia
- Species: H. glebosa

Binomial name
- Hibbertia glebosa Toelken

Species of plant

Hibbertia glebosa is a species of flowering plant in the family Dilleniaceae and is endemic to South Australia. It is a spreading to low-lying shrub with linear to lance-shaped leaves and yellow flowers arranged singly, with six or seven stamens in a cluster on one side of the two carpels.

== Description ==
Hibbertia glebosa is a spreading to low-lying shrub that typically grows up to 50 cm (20 in) high and is densely-branched when mature. The leaves are linear to lance-shaped, 4.5–7 mm (0.18–0.28 in) long and 0.6–1.4 mm (0.024–0.055 in) wide on a petiole 0.2–0.5 mm (0.0079–0.0197 in) long. The flowers are arranged singly in leaf axils and on the ends of branchlets on a peduncle 5–15 mm (0.20–0.59 in) long. There are linear to elliptic bracts 5–6 mm (0.20–0.24 in) long. The outer sepals lobes are 5.5–6.5 mm (0.22–0.26 in) long and the inner lobes slightly shorter but wider. The five petals are egg-shaped with the narrower end towards the base, yellow and 6–11 mm (0.24–0.43 in) long. There are six or seven stamens in a cluster on one side of the two carpels.

== Taxonomy ==
Hibbertia glebosa was first formally described in 2010 by Hellmut R. Toelken in the Journal of the Adelaide Botanic Gardens from specimens collected by Robert John Bates on Mount Crawford in 1993. The specific epithet (glebosa) means "lumpy", referring to the surface of the outer sepal lobes.

In the same journal, Toelken described two subspecies and the names are accepted by the Australian Plant Census:

- Hibbertia glebosa Toelken subsp. glebosa has leaves 0.6–0.8 mm (0.024–0.031 in) wide and outer bracts 5.5–7 mm (0.22–0.28 in) long, and mainly flowers from August to December;
- Hibbertia glebosa subsp. oblonga Toelken has leaves 1–2 mm (0.039–0.079 in) wide and outer bracts 4.3–5.2 mm (0.17–0.20 in) long and flowers in September and October.

== Distribution and habitat ==
This hiibertia grows in open woodland, subspecies glebosa in the Mount Lofty Ranges and subspecies oblonga on the western end of Kangaroo Island, usually near swamps or creeks.

== See also ==
- List of Hibbertia species
