= Cromer Conservation Park =

Protected area in South Australia

- IUCN category III (natural monument or feature)
- Location within South Australia
- Location: South Australia
- Nearest city: Birdwood
- Coordinates: 34°46′29″S 138°58′53″E
- Area: 44 ha (110 acres)
- Established: 22 January 1976
- Governing body: Department for Environment and Water

Cromer Conservation Park is a protected area located in the Australian state of South Australia in the locality of Cromer in the Adelaide Hills state government region about 38 kilometres (24 mi) north-east of the state capital of Adelaide and about 4 kilometres (2.5 mi) north of the town centre in Birdwood.

The conservation park consists of land in section 9 in the cadastral unit of the Hundred of Talunga. It was proclaimed under the National Parks and Wildlife Act 1972 on 22 January 1976. As of 2016, it covered an area of 44 hectares (110 acres).

In 1980, it was described as follows:

One of few areas of natural vegetation in the Mount Lofty Ranges which have not been disturbed by a history of grazing or other deleterious land use. As such it is a highly significant remnant of the wetter Mount Lofty Range vegetation. Though a small reserve, it contains a wide diversity of plant and bird species. A small Park of gentle relief, exhibiting vegetation dominated by Eucalyptus leucoxylon / E fasciculosa open forest with E. obliqua, E. goniocalyx and E. camaldulensis. The understorey consists of a dense shrub heath in which species of Acacia, Hakea, Banksia and Xanthorrhoea are the dominant constituents. Approximately seventy bird species have been recorded in the park. The park is in pristine condition having never been grazed by stock, however its limited size means it is susceptible to outside disturbance. This area is bounded on two sides by pine plantations.

In 2016, the conservation park was reported as being one of three sites in South Australia where the blue star sun-orchid (Thelymitra hygrophila) has been found. The orchid species was listed on 5 May 2016 as being Critically Endangered under the Australian Environment Protection and Biodiversity Conservation Act 1999.

The conservation park is classified as an IUCN Category III protected area. In 1980, it was listed on the now-defunct Register of the National Estate.

== See also ==
- Protected areas of South Australia
