= Bonney Flat Creek =

Bonney Flat Creek South Australia
- Coordinates: 34.00°S 138.81°E
- Postcode(s): 5245
- Time zone: ACST (UTC+9:30)
  - Summer (DST): ACDT (UTC+10:30)
- LGA(s): Adelaide Hills Council
- State electorate(s): Kavel
- Federal division(s): Mayo

Originally in an area named "Bonney's Flat", Bonney Flat Creek is a few kilometres west of Balhannah, South Australia, where the Camac family were prominent settlers. This is the site of the historic Bonney Flat Cemetery.

Another area, about 30 kilometres (19 mi) to the north and east, was also once known as "Bonney's Flat", now in the locality of Cromer. Early farmers in that area included the Hannaford family.
