= Forreston, South Australia =

Village in South Australia

Forreston
- Town
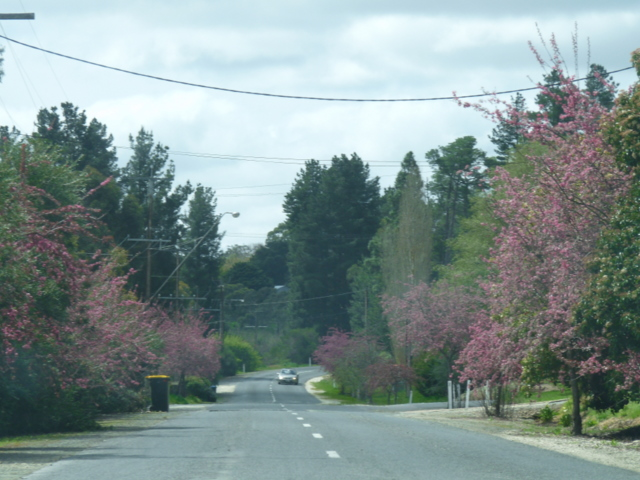
- The main street of Forreston, South Australia in full bloom at springtime

- Coordinates: 34°48′0″S 138°54′0″E
- Country: Australia
- State: South Australia
- LGA: Adelaide Hills Council
- Location: 41 km (25 mi) from Adelaide; 3 km (1.9 mi) from Gumeracha
- Established: 1850

Government
  - State electorate: Newland
  - Federal division: Mayo

Population
  - Total: 407 (SAL 2021)
- Postcode: 5233
Localities around Forreston
| Kersbrook | Williamstown | Mount Crawford |
| Kersbrook | Forreston | Cromer |
| Chain of Ponds | Gumeracha | Birdwood |

Forreston is a locality/village near Adelaide, South Australia. It is located in the Adelaide Hills Council local government area 3 km northeast of Gumeracha and southeast of Williamstown.

== History ==
The town was named in honour of its founder, Alexander Forrest (not to be confused with the Western Australian explorer and surveyor of the same name).

Forreston is curious in that, being only 3 km from Gumeracha, it did so well. Alexander Forrest, a blacksmith by trade, arrived in South Australia in 1848, settling in the Forreston area in 1850 and laying out the village in 1858. The Gumeracha North School opened in 1860 and closed in 1967. At one stage, it had a post office, store, wine shop, wheelwright, blacksmith, butcher, school and more. In 1884, gold was found at nearby Watts Gully, yielding nuggets as large as 14 ounces, and the town peaked. However, the town is no more, with only reminders in its historical buildings, including Forrest's original home, of its vibrant commercial past.

The region relies heavily on grazing, dairying and market gardening.

== Geography ==
Forreston is located 3 km northeast of Gumeracha on the road to Williamstown. Forreston is served by facilities in Gumeracha.

== Transport ==
The area is not serviced by the Adelaide Metro public transport network, but regular public coaches are operated from Tea Tree Plaza Interchange to nearby Gumeracha, Birdwood and Mount Pleasant by LinkSA.
