= South Para Dam =

Dam and reservoir in Adelaide, South Australia

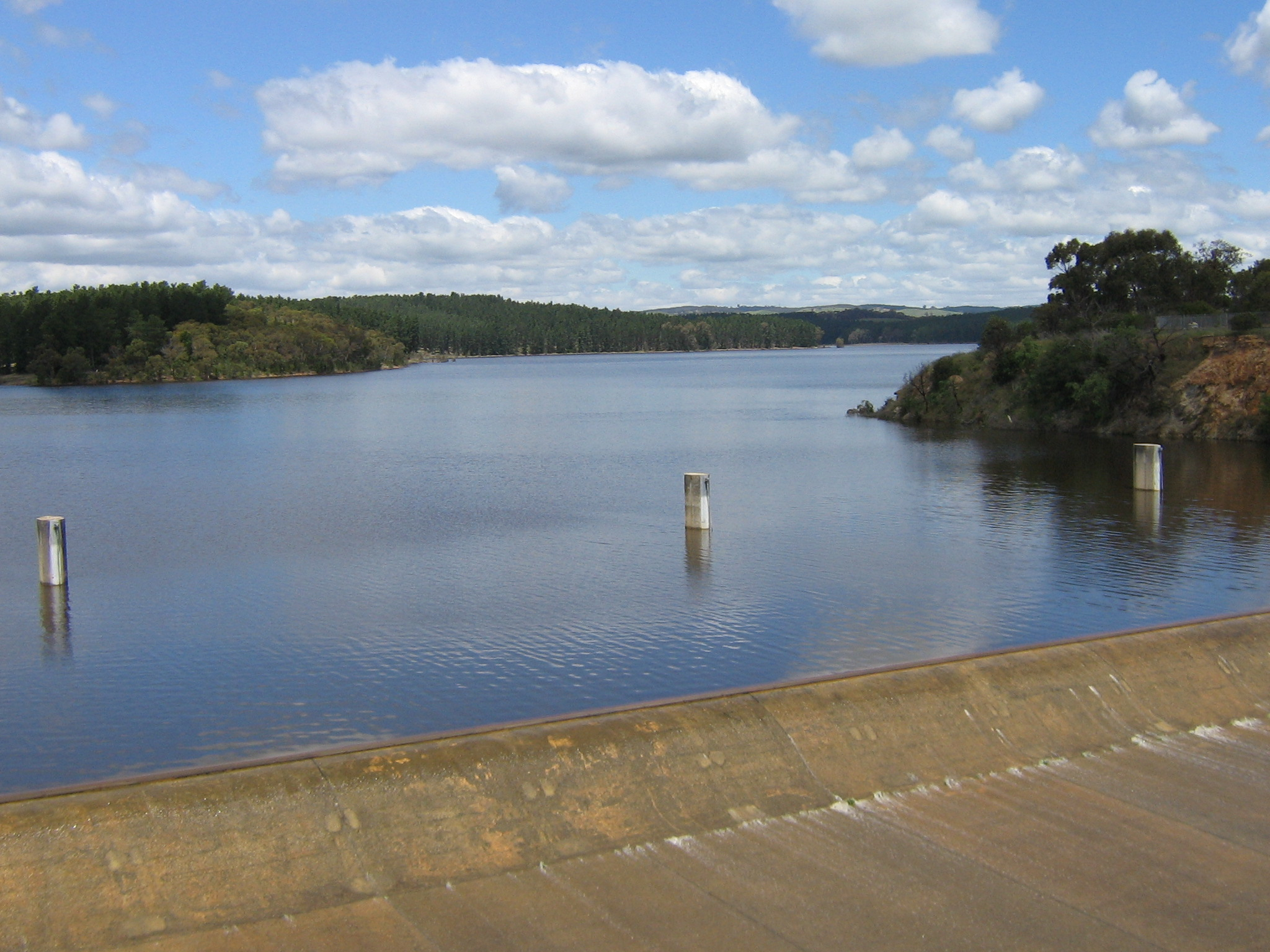
- The reservoir, viewed from the bridge over the spillway, in 2005

- Location of the dam in South Australia
- Interactive map of South Para Dam
- Country: Australia
- Location: Adelaide Plains, South Australia
- Coordinates: 34°41′20″S 138°51′12″E
- Purpose: Water supply
- Status: Operational
- Construction began: 1949
- Opening date: 1958
- Construction cost: A$6.4 million
- Owner: Government of South Australia
- Operator: SA Water

Dam and spillways
- Type of dam: Earth fill dam
- Impounds: South Para River
- Height (foundation): 48 m (157 ft)
- Length: 284 m (932 ft)
- Dam volume: 553×10^{3} m^{3} (19.5×10^{6} cu ft)
- Spillway type: Uncontrolled
- Spillway capacity: 2,260 m^{3}/s (80,000 cu ft/s)

Reservoir
- Creates: South Para Reservoir
- Total capacity: 45.33 GL (36,750 acre⋅ft)
- Catchment area: 228 km^{2} (88 sq mi)
- Surface area: 444 hectares (1,100 acres)
- Normal elevation: 250 m (820 ft) AHD
- Website sawater.com.au

The South Para Dam is an earth-filled embankment dam across the South Para River, located near Williamstown, on the Adelaide Plains, 38 kilometres (24 mi) north-east of Adelaide, in South Australia. Completed in 1958, the resultant reservoir, the South Para Reservoir, was established to supply potable water for Adelaide. After the Mount Bold Reservoir, it is the second largest reservoir in South Australia, and it reaches full capacity approximately once in every five years.

== Overview ==
The earth-filled dam wall is 48 metres (157 ft) high and 284 metres (932 ft) long. When full, the reservoir has capacity of 45.33 gigalitres (36,750 acre⋅ft) and covers 444 hectares (1,100 acres), drawn from a catchment area of 228 square kilometres (88 sq mi). The uncontrolled spillway has a flow capacity of 2,260 cubic metres per second (80,000 cu ft/s).

Costing A$6.4 million, the reservoir took almost a decade to construct, between 1949 and 1958, due to a demand on resources in the post-war boom. The building of the historic Mannum–Adelaide pipeline from the River Murray to the water-short city of Adelaide was a key delay in South Para's construction; that pipeline today disperses water into the reservoir.

Immediately downstream from the dam wall, water is diverted from a weir to the Barossa Reservoir via an underground tunnel. This water is then treated and supplies Adelaide's northern suburbs including Elizabeth, Smithfield, Gawler and adjacent settlements.

SA Water completed a review of the dam's safety 1998 and it recommended increasing the dam wall by approximately 2.3 metres (7 ft 7 in), raising the spillway crest, and additional safety works. The works were estimated to cost A$8.22 million; and were due to commence in 2012.

== Recreation ==
The reservoir is surrounded by nature reserve and has been a focus for two major revegetation projects, the first in the late 1950s when over 5000 trees and shrubs were planted, and the second as part of the South Australian Government's "Million Trees" initiative.

== Discovery of Alan Barnes ==
On 24 June 1979, the mutilated body of 16-year-old Alan Barnes was found after being dumped in the South Para Reservoir. His murder is one of the five cases known as The Family Murders. A pathology report revealed his death was due to blood loss, while toxicology reports showed the presence of alcohol and sedatives.

== Gallery ==
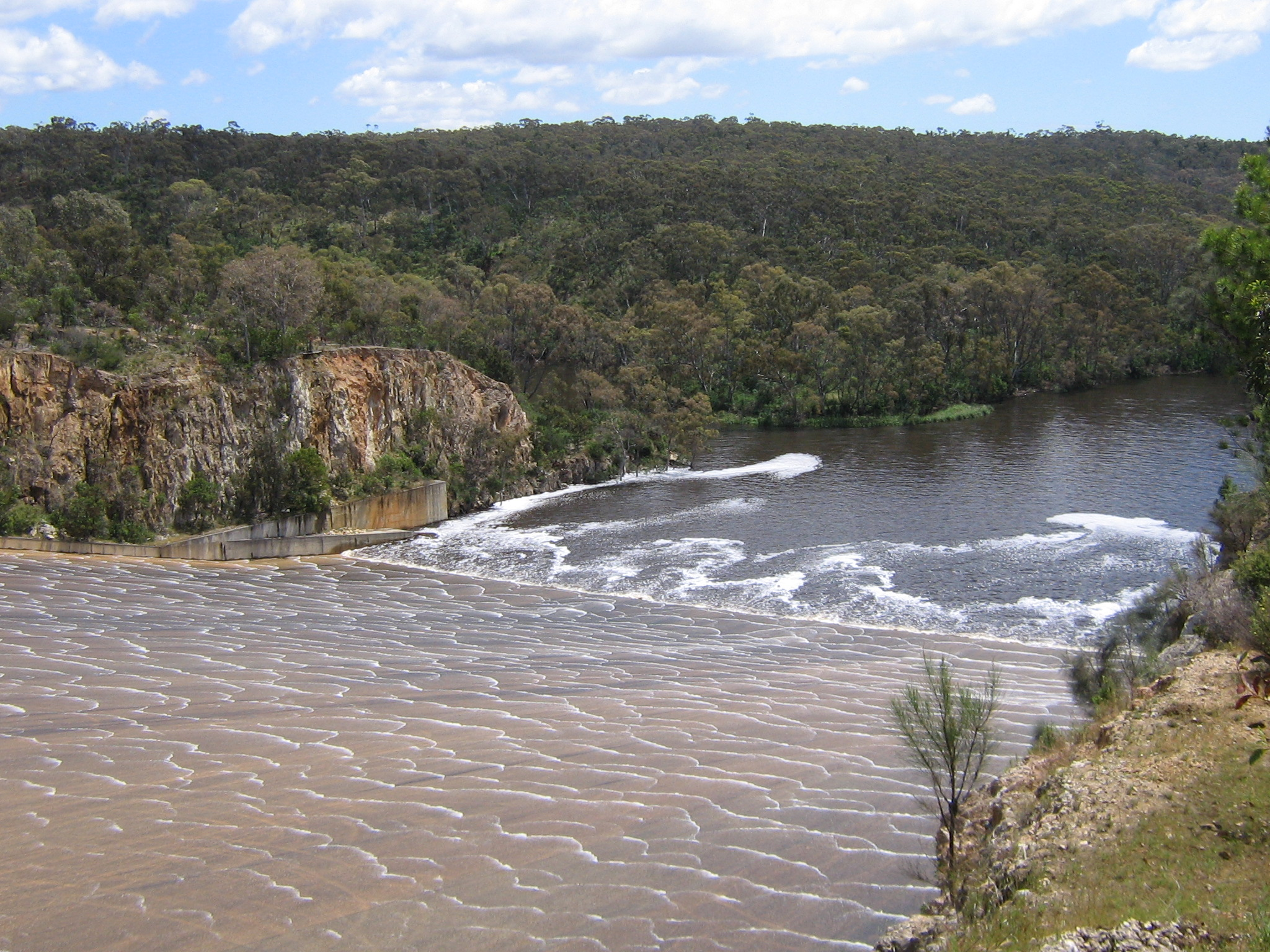
The dam spillway

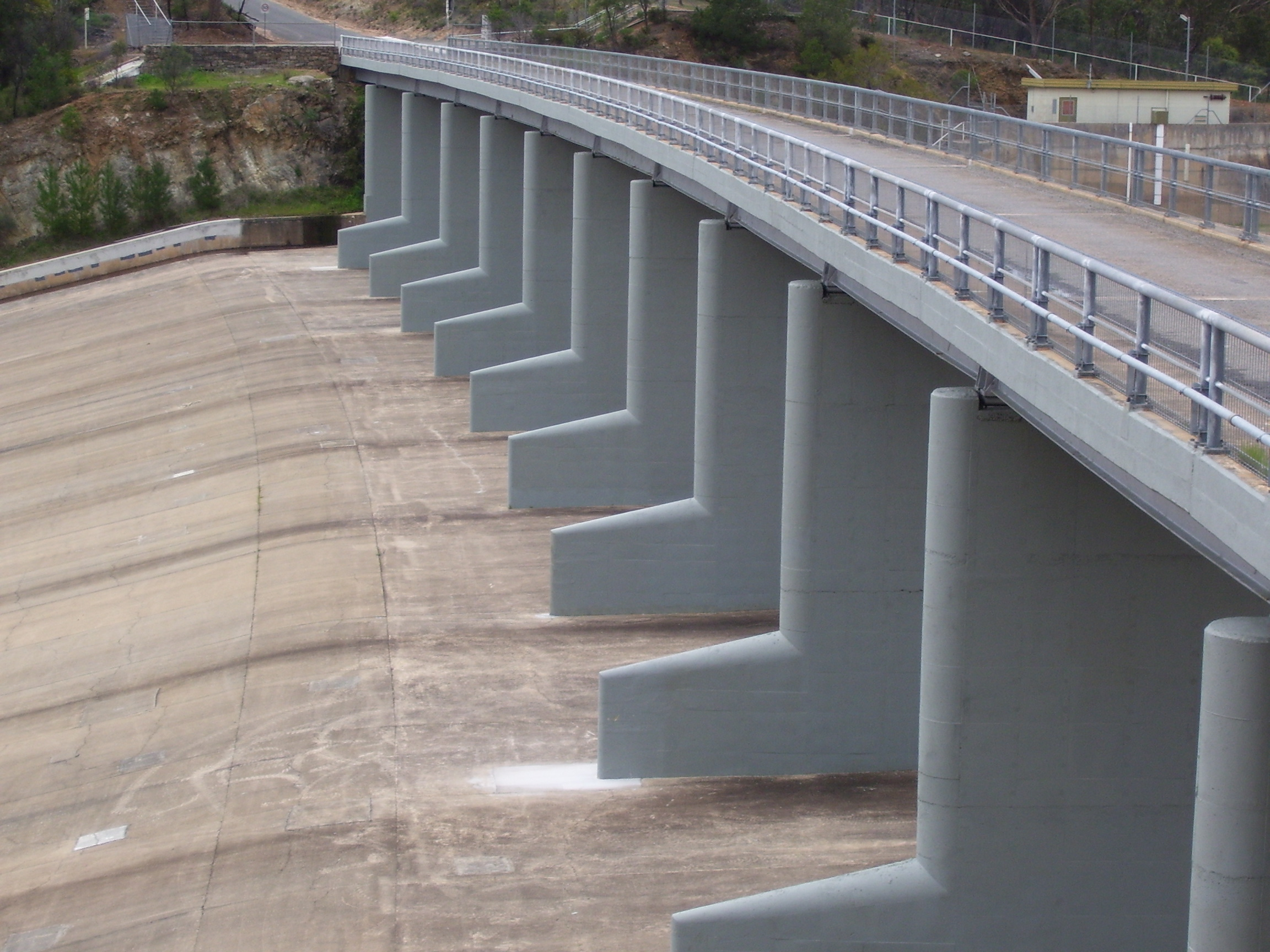
Bridge over spillway

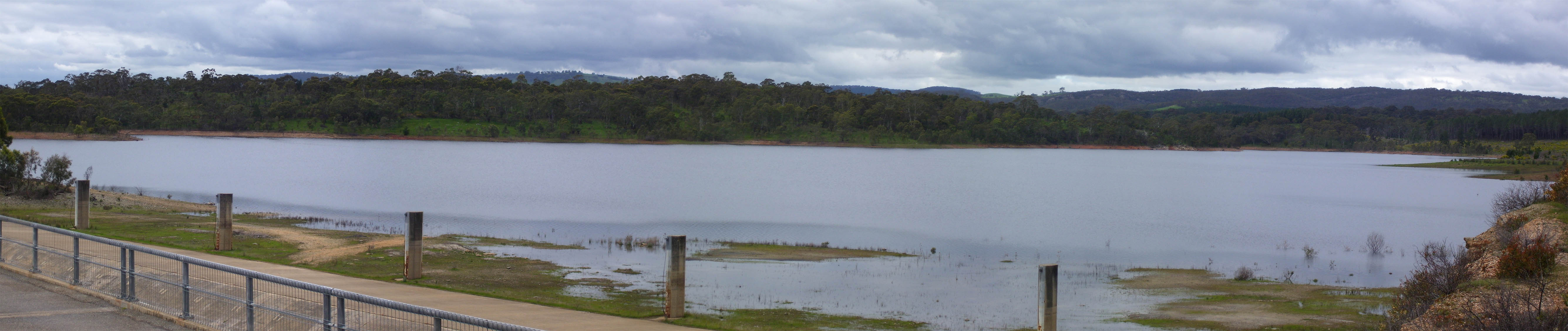
Water levels in September 2009

== See also ==
- List of reservoirs and dams in South Australia
