= Cromer, South Australia =

Cromer South Australia
- Coordinates: 34.76°S 138.99°E
- Postcode(s): 5235
- Time zone: ACST (UTC+9:30)
  - Summer (DST): ACDT (UTC+10:30)
- Location: 14 km (9 mi) southwest of Williamstown; 10 km (6 mi) west of Mount Pleasant
- State electorate(s): Schubert
- Federal division(s): Barker; Mayo
Localities around Cromer:
	Mount Crawford
	Cromer	Mount Pleasant
Forreston	Birdwood

Cromer is a locality in the Adelaide Hills of South Australia. It spans the boundary between the Adelaide Hills Council and the Barossa Council northwest of Mount Pleasant and includes the Cromer Conservation Park.

Early farmers in the area included the Hannaford family. Cromer was the scene of an alluvial gold rush in 1870 at a site named Bonney's Flat on Hannaford Creek. (Bonney Flat Creek is 30 km away, west of Balhannah).

The school opened as "Para Wirra" in 1898. It was renamed Cromer in 1899 and closed in 1950. The post office opened in 1910 and closed in 1944.
