= Birdwood High School =

Location
- Birdwood, South Australia, South Australia; Australia
- Coordinates: 34.8204172°S 138.95852°E

Information
- Former name: Blumberg High School
- School type: Public, secondary school
- Motto: Latin: labor omnia vincit (Hard work conquers all)
- Established: 1909
- Principal
- Teaching staff: 42
- Grades: 7–12
- Enrolment: 555
- Colour: Navy blue
- Website: www.birdwoodhs.sa.edu.au

Birdwood High School is a public high school in the Adelaide Hills town, Birdwood. Birdwood High School was founded in 1909 and is located beside Birdwood Primary School.

In 2013 the school opened up its exhibition centre as a venue of the Adelaide Fringe, winning the BankSA Best Venue Award.
