= Warren Dam =

Dam and reservoir in Adelaide, South Australia

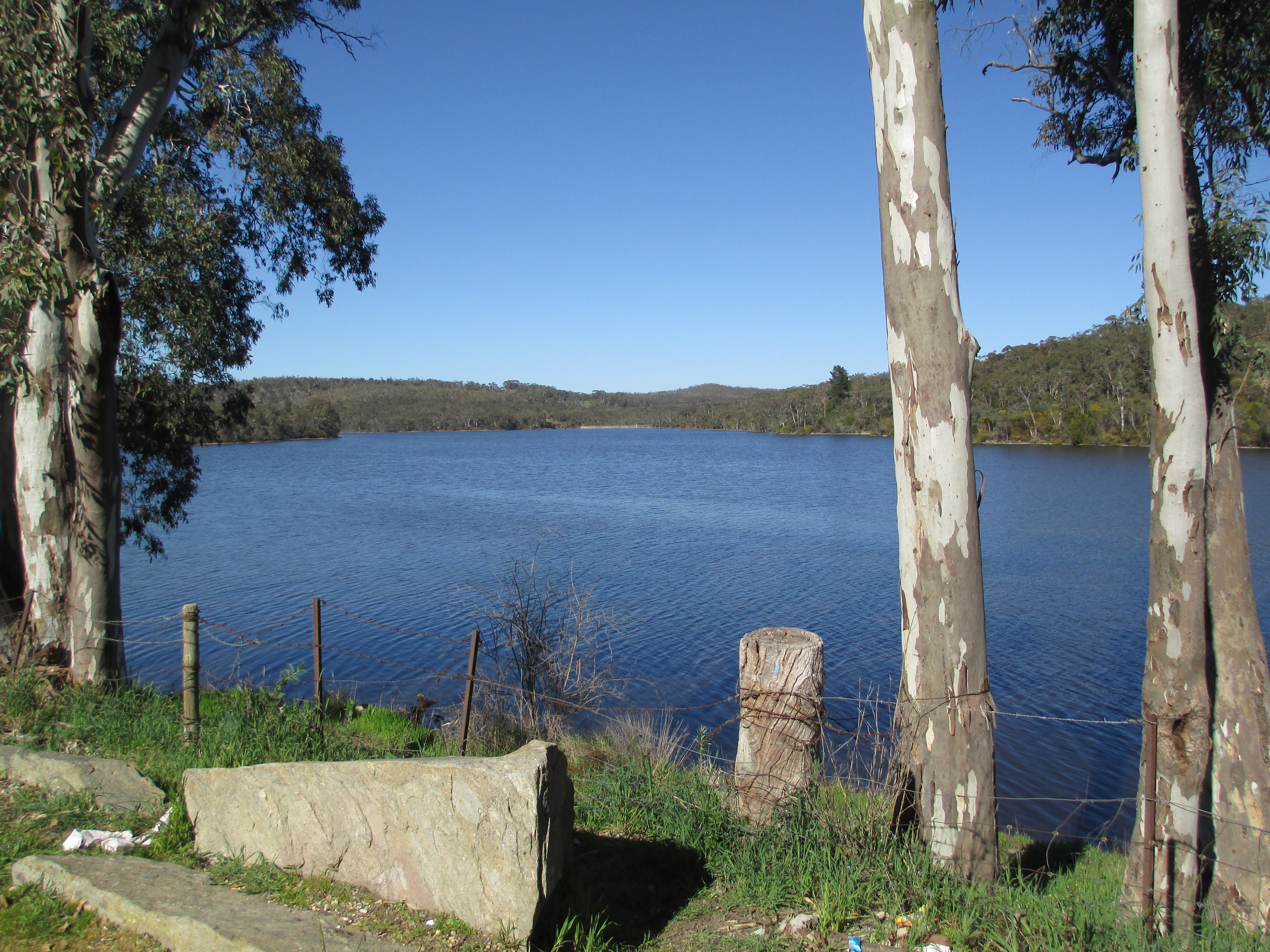
- View across the reservoir in 2014

- Location of the dam in South Australia
- Interactive map of Warren Dam
- Country: Australia
- Location: Adelaide Plains, South Australia
- Coordinates: 34°42′8″S 138°55′30″E
- Purpose: Water supply
- Status: Operational
- Construction began: 1914
- Opening date: 1916
- Owner: Government of South Australia
- Operator: SA Water

Dam and spillways
- Type of dam: Gravity dam
- Impounds: South Para River
- Height (foundation): 24 m (79 ft)
- Length: 150 m (490 ft)
- Dam volume: 10×10^{3} m^{3} (350×10^{3} cu ft)
- Spillway type: Uncontrolled
- Spillway capacity: 119 m^{3}/s (4,200 cu ft/s)

Reservoir
- Creates: Warren Reservoir
- Total capacity: 4,790 ML (169×10^{6} cu ft)
- Catchment area: 119 km^{2} (46 sq mi)
- Surface area: 105 ha (260 acres)
- Normal elevation: 387 m (1,270 ft) AHD

The Warren Dam is a gravity dam across the South Para River, located south of Williamstown and north of Birdwood, on the north-eastern outskirts of Adelaide, in South Australia. Completed in 1916, the resultant reservoir, the Warren Reservoir, was established to supply potable water for Adelaide's northern suburbs.

== Overview ==
The dam was built between 1914 and 1916, during World War I. The concrete dam wall is 24 metres (79 ft) high and 150 metres (490 ft) long. When full, the reservoir has capacity of 4,790 megalitres (3,880 acre⋅ft) and covers 105 hectares (260 acres), drawn from a catchment area of 119 square kilometres (46 sq mi). The uncontrolled spillway has a flow capacity of 119 cubic metres per second (4,200 cu ft/s).

The reservoir and its surrounding grounds features various trails and recreational activities.

== Gallery ==
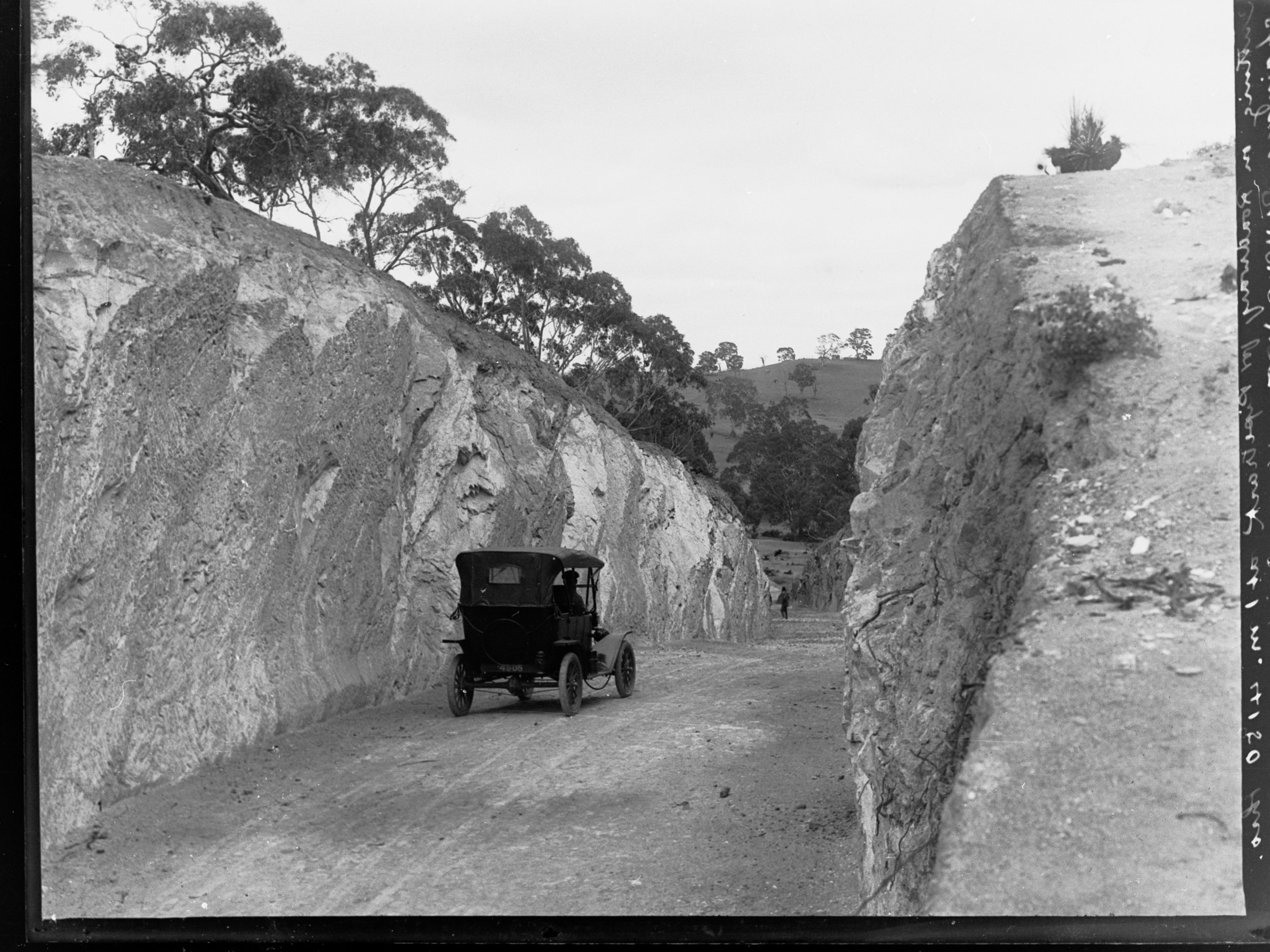
Construction of the dam wall, in c. 1915

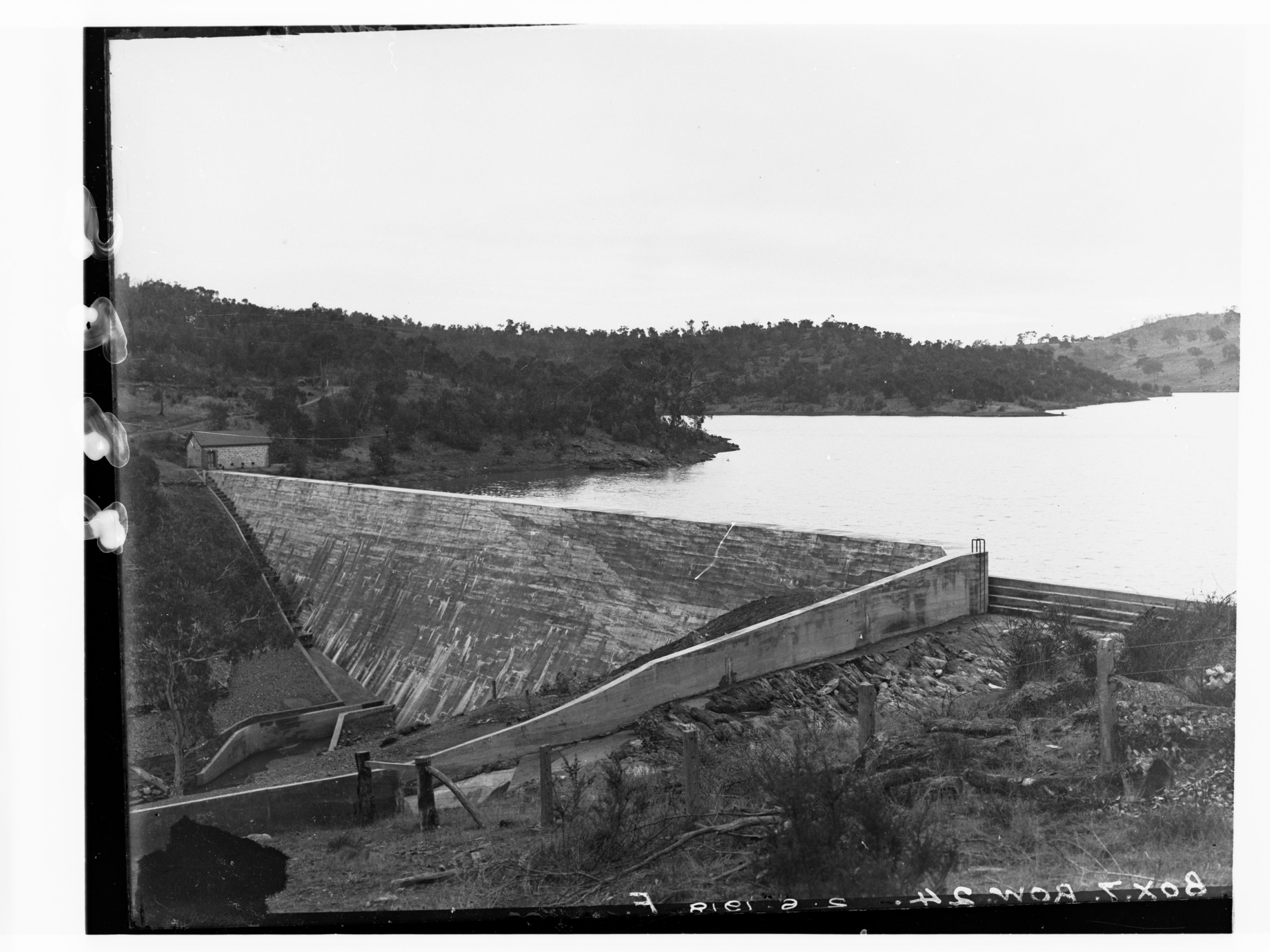
The dam in 1918

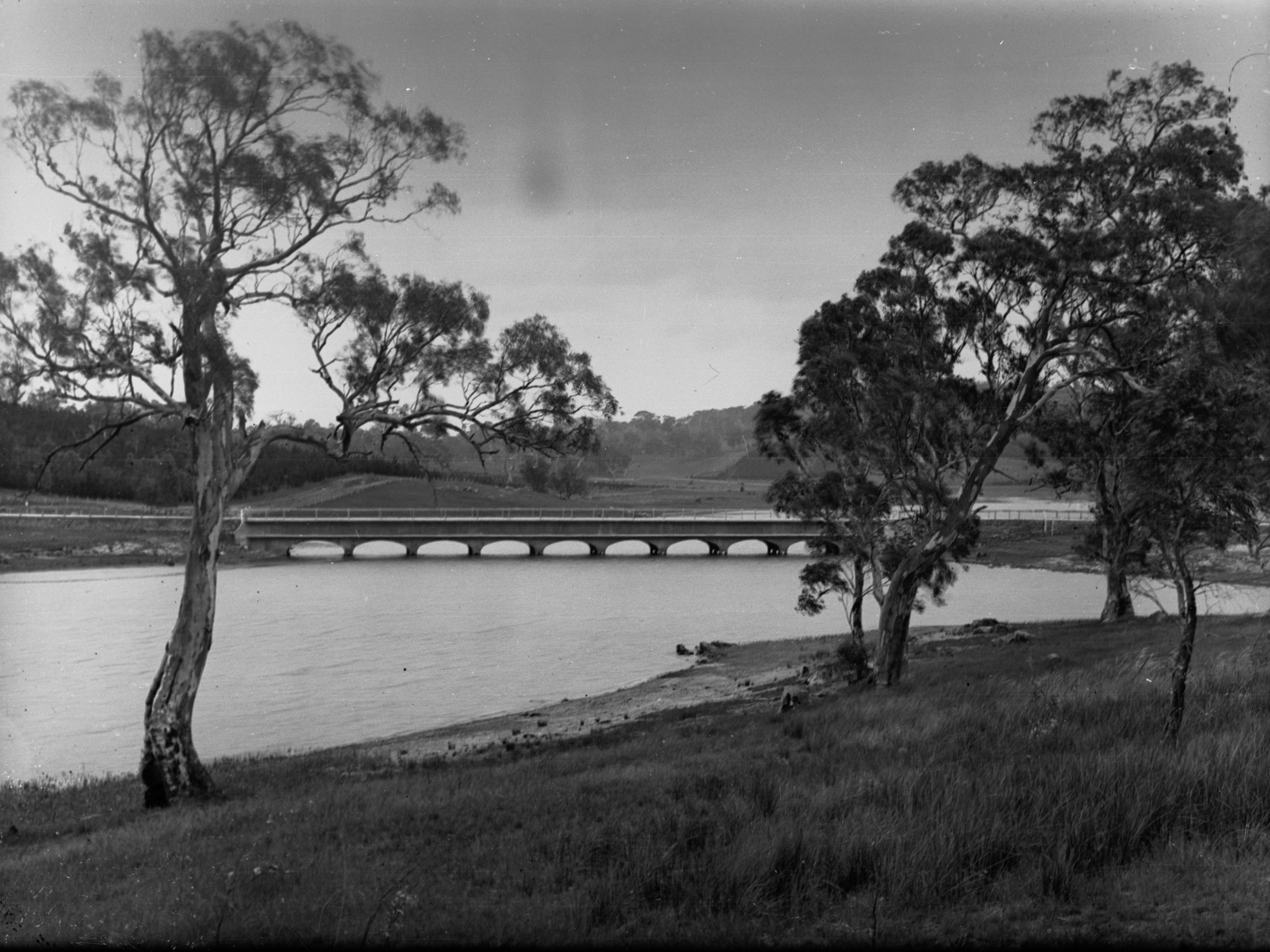
The reservoir in 1929

== See also ==
- List of reservoirs and dams in South Australia
