= South Para River =

River in South Australia

South Para
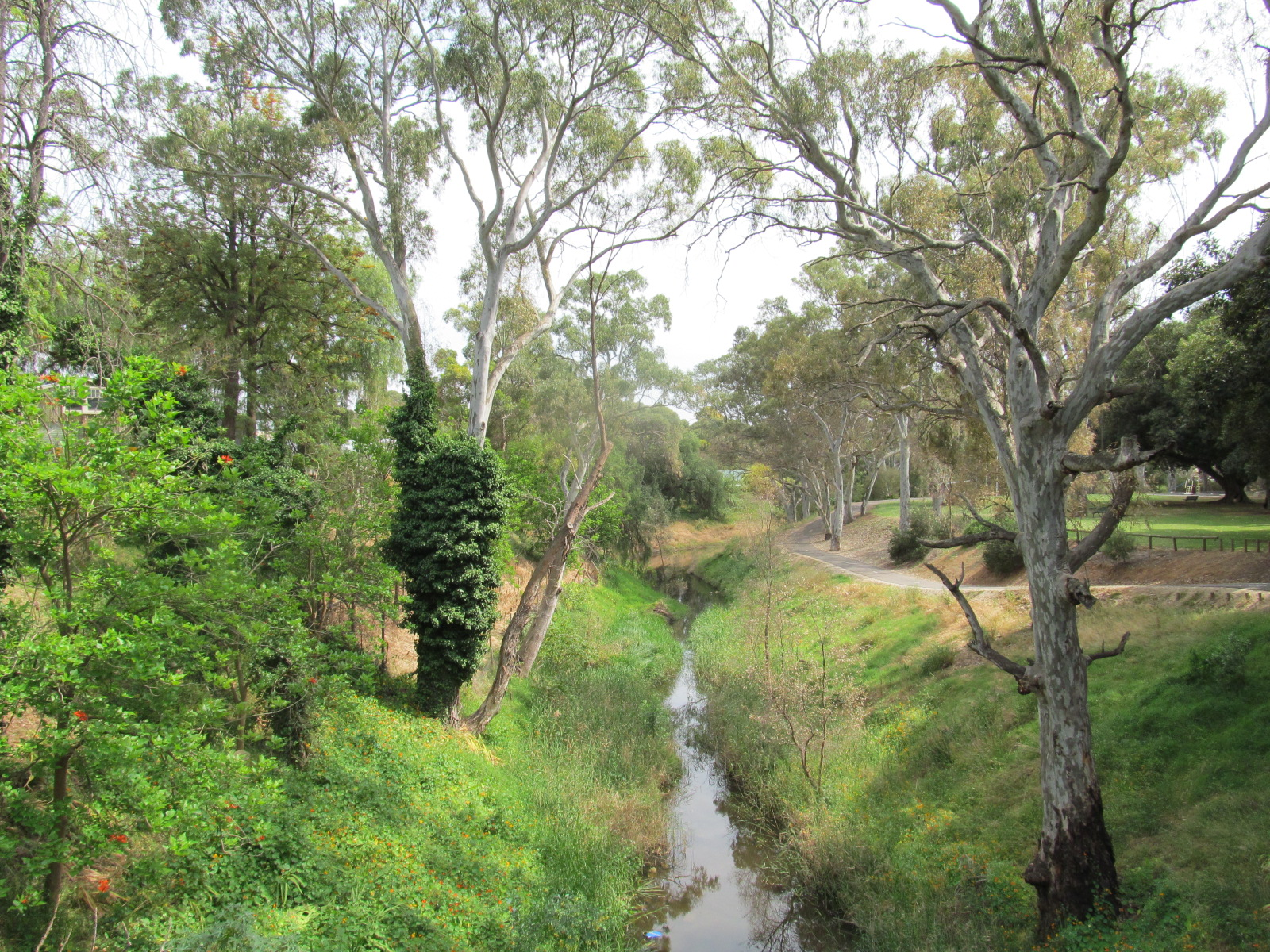
- The South Para River, viewed from Gawler Bridge

- Location of the river mouth in South Australia

Location
- Country: Australia
- State: South Australia
- Region: Mount Lofty Ranges
- Towns: Gawler

Physical characteristics
- Source: Mount Lofty Ranges
  - location: near Mount Crawford
  - elevation: 459 m (1,506 ft)
- Mouth: confluence with the North Para River to form the Gawler River
  - location: at Gawler
  - coordinates: 34°36′S 138°45′E
  - elevation: 48 m (157 ft)
- Length: 48 km (30 mi)

Basin features
- River system: Gawler River
- Tributaries
  - left: Watts Gully Creek
  - right: Malcolm Creek
- Reservoirs: Warren Reservoir; South Para Reservoir

The South Para River is a river in the Mount Lofty Ranges northeast of Adelaide in the Australian state of South Australia.

The river's name is based directly on the Kaurna word pari which means river. The "south" descriptor distinguishes it from the North Para River with which it merges.

== Course and features ==
The South Para River rises in the Mount Lofty Ranges near Mount Crawford and Kersbrook and flows northwest through the Mount Lofty Ranges, passing through the Warren Reservoir and the South Para Reservoir, before reaching its confluence with the North Para River in Gawler to form the Gawler River. The South Para River descends 411 metres (1,348 ft) over its 47.5-kilometre (29.5 mi) course.

The South Para River catchment is one of the key watersheds in the northern Mount Lofty Ranges. It plays an important role in the functioning of South Australia, providing much of the water used by Adelaide's domestic supply in the Northern Adelaide area. The rainfall in the South Para River catchment varies from 775 millimetres (30.5 in) per annum in the north-east of the catchment to 675 millimetres (26.6 in) per annum near Williamstown. Its waters are also used for livestock production, cereal cropping and recreation.

== See also ==
- Hundred of Barossa
- Hundred of Para Wirra
- Hundred of Yatala
- List of rivers of Australia § South Australia
