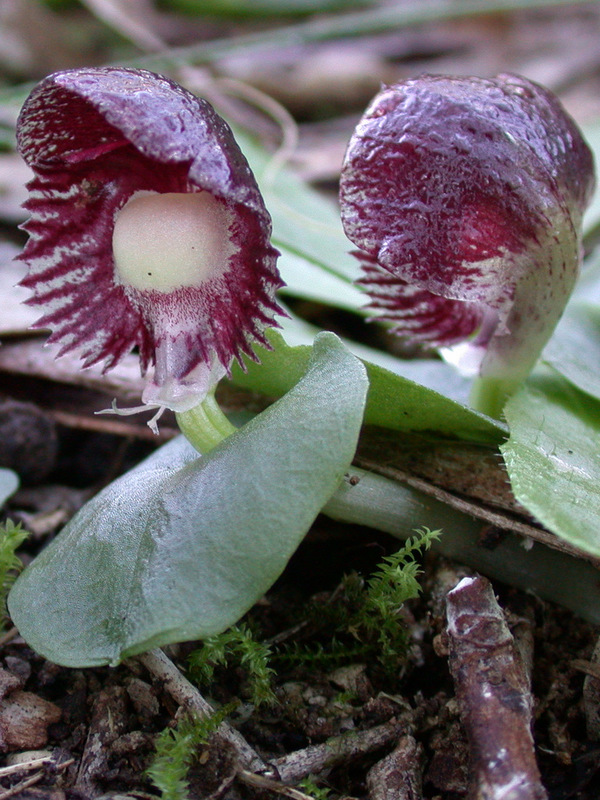
- Corybas diemenicus near Inverleigh

Scientific classification
- Kingdom: Plantae
- Clade: Tracheophytes
- Clade: Angiosperms
- Clade: Monocots
- Order: Asparagales
- Family: Orchidaceae
- Subfamily: Orchidoideae
- Tribe: Diurideae
- Genus: Corybas
- Species: C. diemenicus

Binomial name
- Corybas diemenicus (Lindl) Rupp

Synonyms
- Corysanthes diemenica Lindl.; Corysanthes diemenica Lindl.; Corysanthes fimbriata var. diemenica (Lindl.) Benth.; Corybas dilatatus (Rupp & Nicholls) Rupp; Corysanthes dilatata Rupp & Nicholls; Corysanthes grumula D.L.Jones; Corybas grumulus (D.L.Jones) G.N.Backh.

= Corybas diemenicus =

Stately helmet orchid

Species of orchid

Corybas diemenicus, commonly known as the stately helmet orchid or veined helmet orchid, is a species of terrestrial orchid endemic to south-eastern Australia. It has round or heart-shaped leaf and a reddish purple flower with a central white patch.

== Description ==
Corybas diemenicus is a terrestrial, perennial, deciduous, herb with a single round or heart-shaped leaf 15–25 mm (0.6–1 in) long and 12–20 mm (0.5–0.8 in) wide. The leaf is green on the upper surface and silvery green on the lower side. There is usually only a single erect, dark reddish to purple flower with translucent areas, 12–16 mm (0.5–0.6 in) long and 10–16 mm (0.4–0.6 in) wide. The dorsal sepal is 18–25 mm (0.7–1 in) long and 12–15 mm (0.5–0.6 in) wide on a stalk about 2 mm (0.08 in) long and forms a hood over the labellum. The lateral sepals are about 4 mm (0.2 in) long, joined at their bases before tapering to a fine tip. The petals are wider than but shorter than the lateral sepals and joined to them. The labellum is 10–13 mm (0.4–0.5 in) long, 11–16 mm (0.4–0.6 in) wide and tube-shaped with a white centre and many short, broad teeth on the edges. Flowering occurs from June to December.

== Taxonomy ==
The stately helmet orchid was first formally described in 1840 by John Lindley and given the name Corysanthes diemenica. The description was published in Lindley's book The Genera and Species of Orchidaceous Plants. In 1942 Herman Rupp and William Nicholls changed the name to Corybas diemenicus. The specific epithet (diemenicus) is a Latin word meaning "belonging to, or from Tasmania". (Tasmania was formerly known as Van Diemen's Land.)

== Distribution and habitat ==
Corybas diemenicus is widespread and common, growing in moist forest and rainforest, sometimes in drier habitats. It occurs in New South Wales south from Barrington Tops National Park through the Australian Capital Territory to the south-east of Victoria and Tasmania.
