= Mount Crawford (South Australia) =

Hill in South Australia

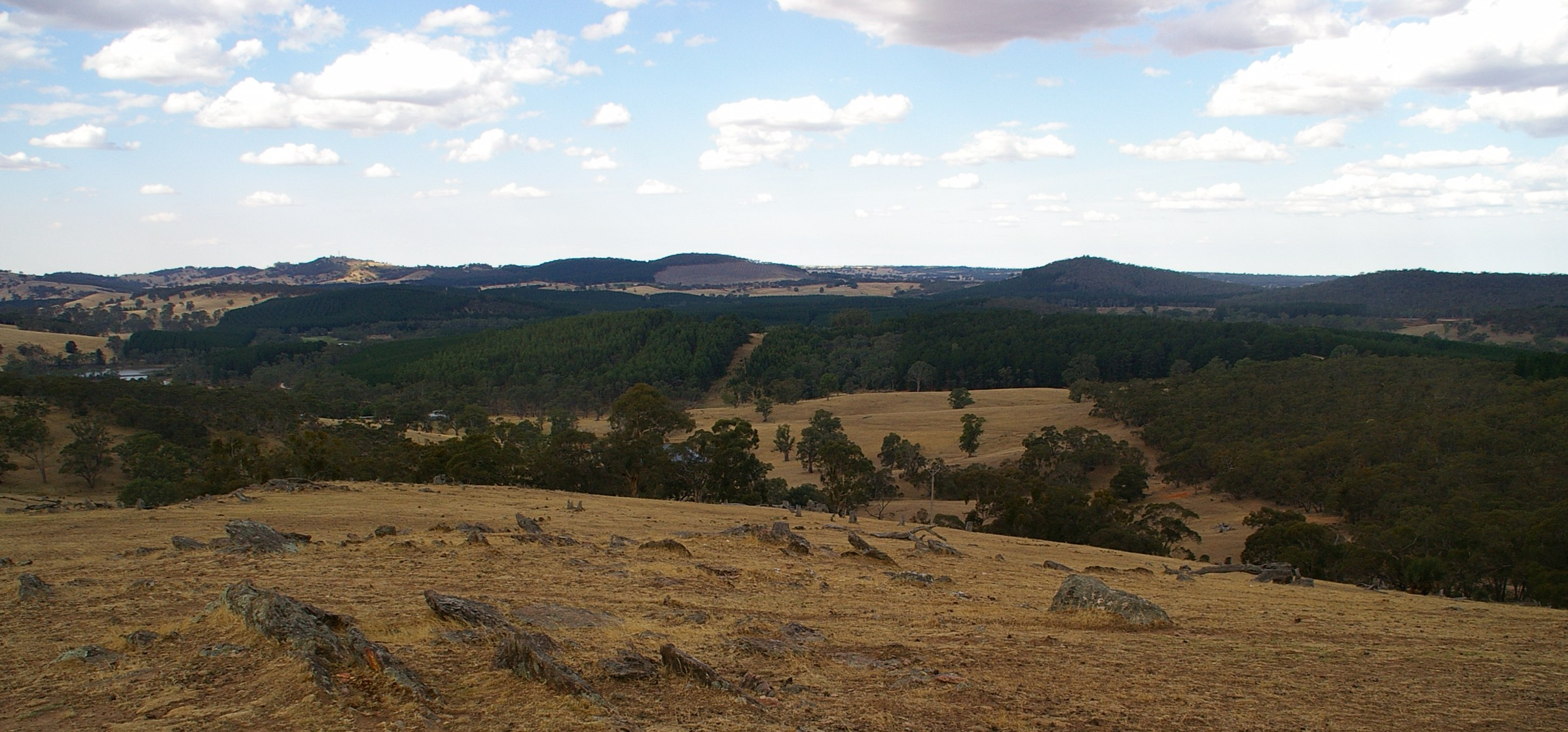
- Mount Crawford (centre right) from Tower Hill, looking east

Highest point
- Elevation: 526 m (1,726 ft)
- Coordinates: 34°41′51.8″S 138°58′1.056″E

Geography
- Location within South Australia
- Location: South Australia, Australia

Mount Crawford is a hill in the locality also named Mount Crawford in South Australia approximately 15 kilometres (9.3 mi) north of Birdwood in the Mount Lofty Ranges.

== History ==
The Indigenous name for Mount Crawford was Teetáka. The mount was given its present name in 1839 by Charles Sturt after James Coutts Crawford (1817–1889). Crawford had a Royal Navy background. He and his drovers arrived overland from NSW in April 1839 with 700 cattle, setting up a hut and cattle run at the base of the mount. Crawford soon moved on to be a pioneer of Wellington, New Zealand.

In February 1840 Crawford's hutkeeper, an old soldier, was bailed up by bushrangers Curran, Hughes, and Fox, who robbed him of his arms and rations. Curran and Hughes were executed by hanging at Adelaide on 16 March 1840 for an armed robbery committed earlier near Gawler.

Geoff Manning, in his Place Names of South Australia, gives a different derivation: E.J.F. Crawford (later proprietor of Hindmarsh Brewery), the explorer J.F. Crawford, and T.G.T. Crawford, sons of Capt. Crawford, master of HMS Victorious ran sheep in the area.

Pioneer families during the first decades of closer settlement included surnames Coleman, Hammat, Rankine, Polden, Murray, Warren, and Whyte. The subsequent history was one of mining and pastoralism, until being largely replaced by forestry and recreation activities.

An alluvial goldrush occurred in the area in the late nineteenth century, and fossicking still goes on in the area today.

== Mount Crawford Forest ==
Mount Crawford also refers to the Mount Crawford Forest which is a grouping of several government forest lands in the area, the largest encompassing the area around Mount Crawford - others are to the west at Mount Gawler and south around Cudlee Creek and Kangaroo Creek Dam. The Barossa Valley is directly to the north. The forest headquarters and an information centre are located near Mount Crawford. Most of the timber grown are pine trees, though there are some native eucalypt plantations. The Heysen Trail passes through the forests. The forests are also popularly used for recreational purposes, with school fairs and camps being held there, along with a rally car race.

== Climate ==
Climate data for Mount Crawford (525m ASL)
| Month | Jan | Feb | Mar | Apr | May | Jun | Jul | Aug | Sep | Oct | Nov | Dec | Year |
|---|---|---|---|---|---|---|---|---|---|---|---|---|---|
| Record high °C (°F) | 43.3 (109.9) | 41.6 (106.9) | 36.9 (98.4) | 34.8 (94.6) | 26.8 (80.2) | 23.0 (73.4) | 20.3 (68.5) | 24.9 (76.8) | 29.8 (85.6) | 34.5 (94.1) | 39.7 (103.5) | 39.7 (103.5) | 43.3 (109.9) |
| Mean daily maximum °C (°F) | 27.5 (81.5) | 27.1 (80.8) | 23.4 (74.1) | 19.2 (66.6) | 15.0 (59.0) | 11.7 (53.1) | 11.0 (51.8) | 12.4 (54.3) | 15.1 (59.2) | 18.2 (64.8) | 22.5 (72.5) | 25.0 (77.0) | 19.0 (66.2) |
| Daily mean °C (°F) | 20.8 (69.4) | 20.6 (69.1) | 17.8 (64.0) | 14.8 (58.6) | 11.8 (53.2) | 9.1 (48.4) | 8.4 (47.1) | 9.3 (48.7) | 11.3 (52.3) | 13.3 (55.9) | 16.7 (62.1) | 18.6 (65.5) | 14.4 (57.9) |
| Mean daily minimum °C (°F) | 14.0 (57.2) | 14.1 (57.4) | 12.2 (54.0) | 10.4 (50.7) | 8.6 (47.5) | 6.5 (43.7) | 5.8 (42.4) | 6.1 (43.0) | 7.4 (45.3) | 8.4 (47.1) | 10.8 (51.4) | 12.1 (53.8) | 9.7 (49.5) |
| Record low °C (°F) | 6.1 (43.0) | 5.5 (41.9) | 4.2 (39.6) | 1.2 (34.2) | 1.1 (34.0) | 0.1 (32.2) | 0.2 (32.4) | −0.6 (30.9) | 0.0 (32.0) | −2.3 (27.9) | 2.0 (35.6) | 4.5 (40.1) | −2.3 (27.9) |
| Average rainfall mm (inches) | 24.4 (0.96) | 25.9 (1.02) | 30.0 (1.18) | 44.7 (1.76) | 68.7 (2.70) | 82.6 (3.25) | 99.3 (3.91) | 86.4 (3.40) | 74.3 (2.93) | 45.8 (1.80) | 31.8 (1.25) | 34.6 (1.36) | 662.7 (26.09) |
| Average rainy days | 5.2 | 5.1 | 8.4 | 10.8 | 14.7 | 17.0 | 18.0 | 17.0 | 16.6 | 12.2 | 9.5 | 8.0 | 142.5 |
| Average relative humidity (%) (at 3pm) | 36 | 38 | 42 | 52 | 67 | 77 | 77 | 70 | 64 | 55 | 47 | 39 | 55 |

Climate data for Mount Crawford Forest Headquarters (395m ASL)
| Month | Jan | Feb | Mar | Apr | May | Jun | Jul | Aug | Sep | Oct | Nov | Dec | Year |
|---|---|---|---|---|---|---|---|---|---|---|---|---|---|
| Record high °C (°F) | 42.5 (108.5) | 42.5 (108.5) | 40.6 (105.1) | 35.0 (95.0) | 26.5 (79.7) | 22.0 (71.6) | 23.5 (74.3) | 25.0 (77.0) | 29.3 (84.7) | 33.0 (91.4) | 39.0 (102.2) | 40.0 (104.0) | 42.5 (108.5) |
| Mean daily maximum °C (°F) | 27.1 (80.8) | 27.5 (81.5) | 24.3 (75.7) | 20.6 (69.1) | 16.1 (61.0) | 13.0 (55.4) | 12.2 (54.0) | 13.1 (55.6) | 15.4 (59.7) | 18.9 (66.0) | 22.0 (71.6) | 24.9 (76.8) | 19.6 (67.3) |
| Daily mean °C (°F) | 19.1 (66.4) | 19.4 (66.9) | 17.0 (62.6) | 13.8 (56.8) | 10.6 (51.1) | 8.3 (46.9) | 7.7 (45.9) | 8.3 (46.9) | 9.9 (49.8) | 12.4 (54.3) | 14.9 (58.8) | 17.2 (63.0) | 13.2 (55.8) |
| Mean daily minimum °C (°F) | 11.1 (52.0) | 11.2 (52.2) | 9.7 (49.5) | 7.0 (44.6) | 5.0 (41.0) | 3.5 (38.3) | 3.1 (37.6) | 3.4 (38.1) | 4.4 (39.9) | 5.9 (42.6) | 7.7 (45.9) | 9.5 (49.1) | 6.8 (44.2) |
| Record low °C (°F) | 2.0 (35.6) | 1.0 (33.8) | −2.2 (28.0) | −3.5 (25.7) | −5.0 (23.0) | −7.0 (19.4) | −7.0 (19.4) | −4.7 (23.5) | −4.0 (24.8) | −3.2 (26.2) | −2.0 (28.4) | 0.1 (32.2) | −7.0 (19.4) |
| Average rainfall mm (inches) | 24.5 (0.96) | 23.7 (0.93) | 27.5 (1.08) | 53.3 (2.10) | 88.9 (3.50) | 97.9 (3.85) | 116.9 (4.60) | 103.4 (4.07) | 82.9 (3.26) | 65.8 (2.59) | 36.7 (1.44) | 34.8 (1.37) | 758.0 (29.84) |
| Average rainy days | 5.7 | 4.8 | 6.2 | 9.9 | 14.3 | 16.0 | 18.9 | 19.2 | 14.8 | 12.7 | 8.8 | 7.7 | 139.0 |
| Average relative humidity (%) (at 3pm) | 36 | 36 | 43 | 51 | 65 | 75 | 73 | 70 | 64 | 56 | 47 | 42 | 55 |

== See also ==
- List of mountains in Australia
