= Birdwood, South Australia =

Birdwood Blumberg
- Town
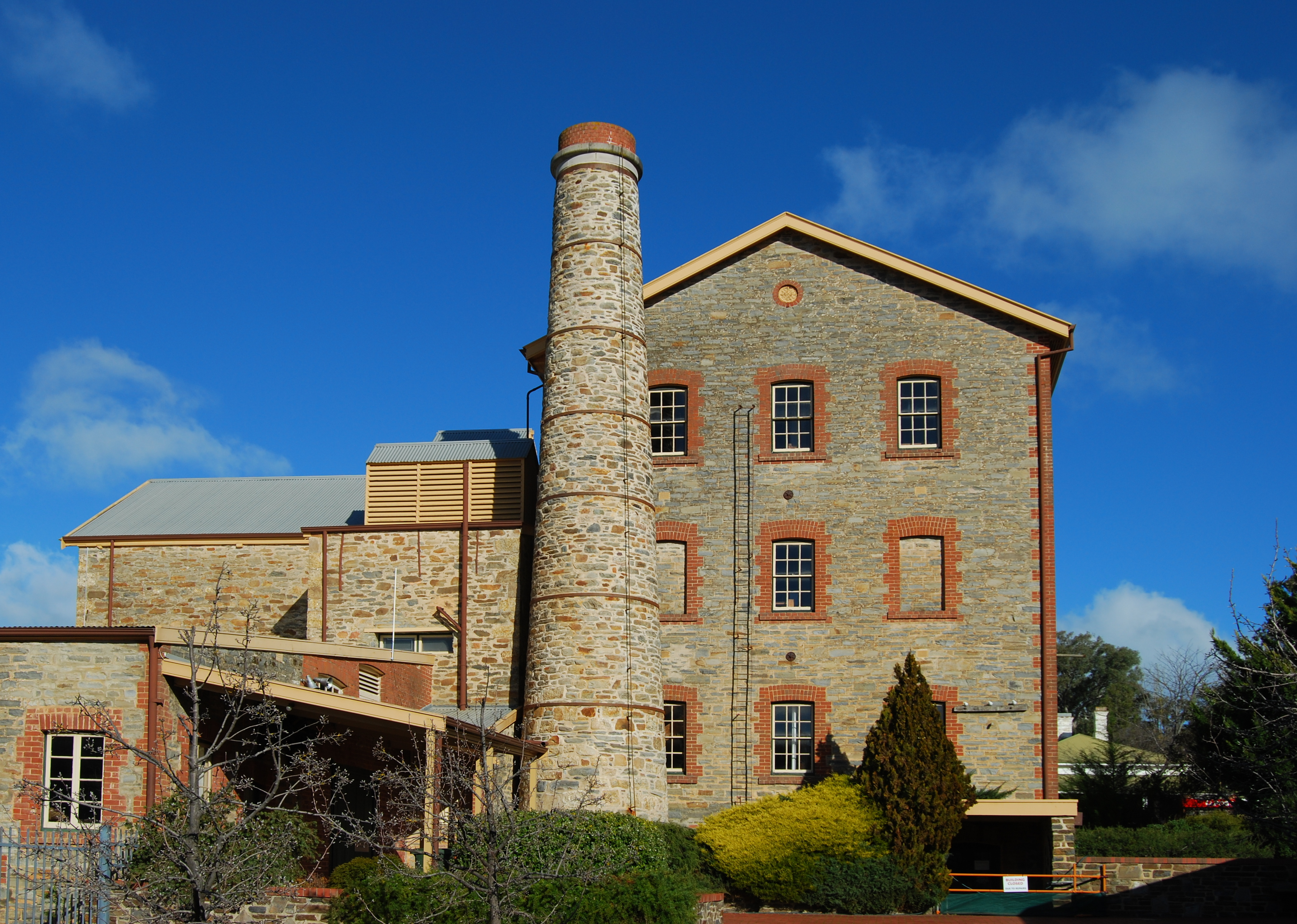
- The old mill building at the National Motor Museum on Birdwood's main street

- Coordinates: 34°49′15″S 138°57′47″E
- Country: Australia
- State: South Australia
- LGAs: Adelaide Hills Council; Mid Murray Council
- Location: 44 km (27 mi) from Adelaide
- Established: 1848

Government
  - State electorate: Morialta
  - Federal division: Mayo

Population
  - Total: 932 (UCL 2021)
- Time zone: ACST
  - Summer (DST): ACDT
- Postcode: 5234
Localities around Birdwood
Forreston	Cromer	Mount Pleasant
Gumeracha	Birdwood	Tungkillo
Kenton Valley	Mount Torrens	Tungkillo

Birdwood, originally named Blumberg (German: [ˈblʊmbɛʁk] BLOOM-berk), is a town in the Adelaide Hills area of South Australia, around 44 km (27 mi) from Adelaide city centre. It is located in the local government areas of the Adelaide Hills Council and the Mid Murray Council.

== History ==
=== Origin of the name ===
Birdwood was originally named Blumberg by Prussian settlers originating from the area around Zullichau. The original name's origins are uncertain, but it is likely that it derives from Groß Blumberg, a village on the Oder River in the settlers' area of origin.

The German town name was anglicised to "Birdwood" during World War I, along with many others in the region in 1918. The new name honoured Sir William Birdwood, the Australian Imperial Force general who led the ANZACs at Gallipoli. Around the same time, the government closed the German-language school.

=== European settlement ===
The first Europeans to explore the district were Dr. George Imlay and John Hill in January 1838. In 1839-40 the South Australian Company claimed several Special Surveys in the district which were later subdivided to allow for closer settlement. Migrants who had temporarily settled at Lobethal began looking for land of their own in 1848. Pastor Fritzsche recommended this spot beside the Torrens, where he camped on the way to Bethany. Birdwood grew with homes on land leased from George Fife Angas and a church some distance away. The town prospered by the 1850s, and the area was producing enough grain to justify the construction of the Blumberg Flour Mill (now the site of the motor museum). In 1865, during the local gold rush, the Blumberg Inn was built.

== Geography ==
Birdwood sits on a crossroads between the Adelaide-Mannum Road, the road leading north towards Williamstown and the Barossa Valley, and the road leading south towards Lobethal, Hahndorf and the South Eastern Freeway.

== Facilities ==
Birdwood has a government-operated primary (opened 1878) and high school (opened 1909), motel, small supermarket, two coffee shop/bakeries, 2 antique shops and a petrol station. A number of churches have formed part of the history of the town, including the St Matthew's Roman Catholic Church, located near the sports grounds, the nearby Lutheran church and cemetery which is just beyond the town limits; the United Church in the centre of town, which united long before the Uniting Church formed, and the Seventh-day Adventist Church further along Shannon Street.

Birdwood is also home to the National Motor Museum (in what used to be the Old Mill), and is the endpoint of the annual Bay to Birdwood run , in which vintage motor vehicles are driven by their owners from Glenelg past the city and through the hills to finish at the museum where a festival is held. The museum was started by Jack Kaines and Len Vigar in 1964, and was purchased by the South Australian Government in 1976, holding a large and historically important collection of cars, motorcycles and commercial vehicles. Next door to the Museum is the Birdwood Motel (2015),

Just north of Birdwood is the Cromer Conservation Park, proclaimed in 1976, with an open-forest formation of long-leafed box with pink gum and an open woodland formation of red gum, which forms an important habitat for honeyeaters. Mining for yellow ochre occurred in the park during the 1800s. There are no formal walking trails or visitor facilities.

It is also home to Birdwood High School which has over 700 students and Birdwood Primary school with about 200 students.

== Transport ==
The area is not serviced by Adelaide Metro public transport. A coach is operated from Tea Tree Plaza Interchange to Gumeracha and Mount Pleasant by LinkSA.

Birdwood has a lot of through traffic. A significant number of road accidents occur on the Adelaide-Mannum Road, and the sites of these are marked with red and black posts.

=== Railway ===
Birdwood once had a train station on the Mount Pleasant railway line at 44.13 miles (71 km) from Adelaide. The line came via Balhannah and was not a very direct route. The line was closed during one of the rail reformations as it was not a very profitable line, probably due to the more direct Adelaide–Mannum Road. The track is now long gone but the earthworks can still be seen along the edges of the Birdwood flat to Mount Torrens and towards Mount Pleasant. Also still standing is an old stone railway bridge near Mount Torrens. The line closed in 1963.

== Gallery ==
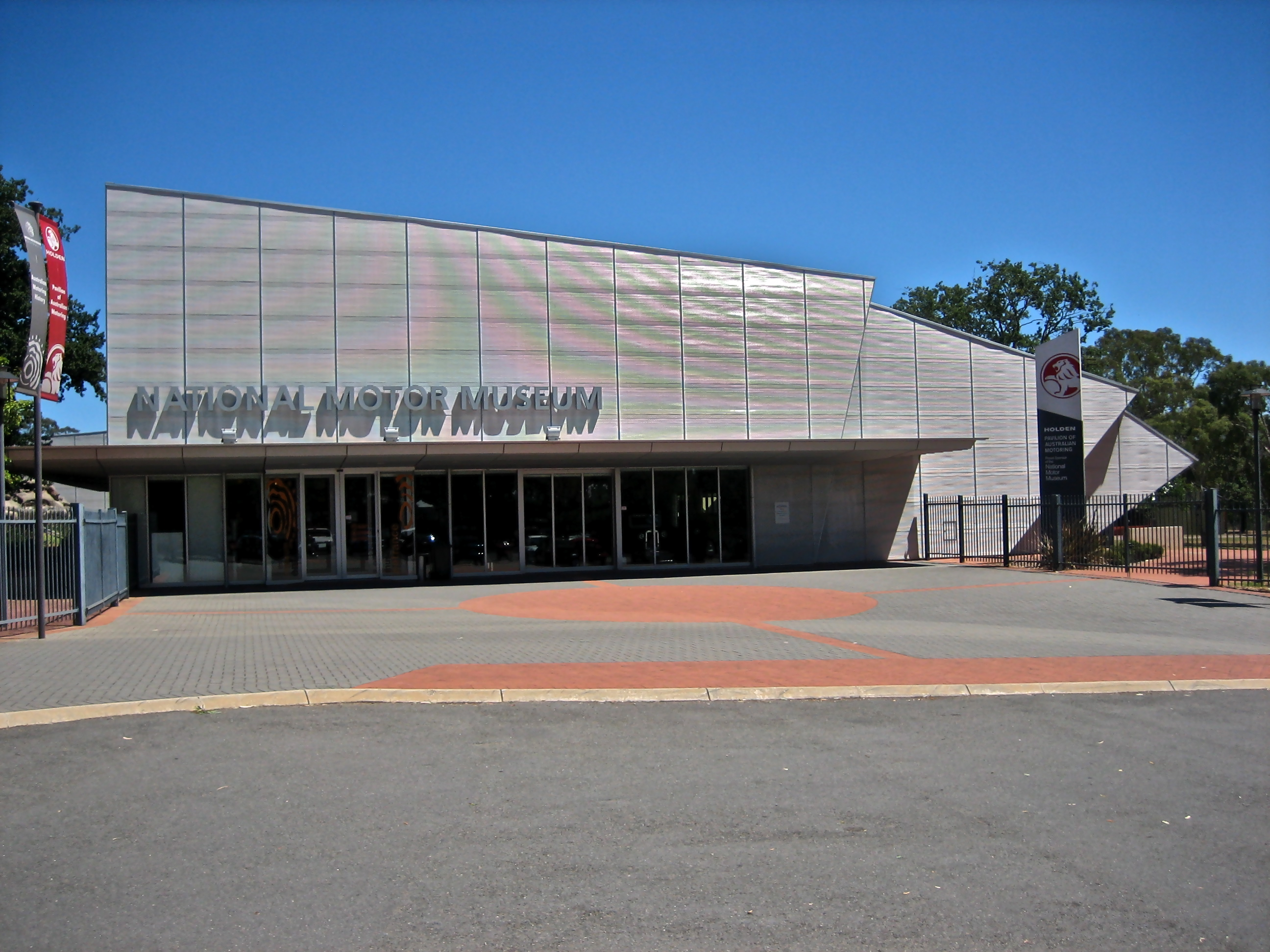
New National Motor Museum

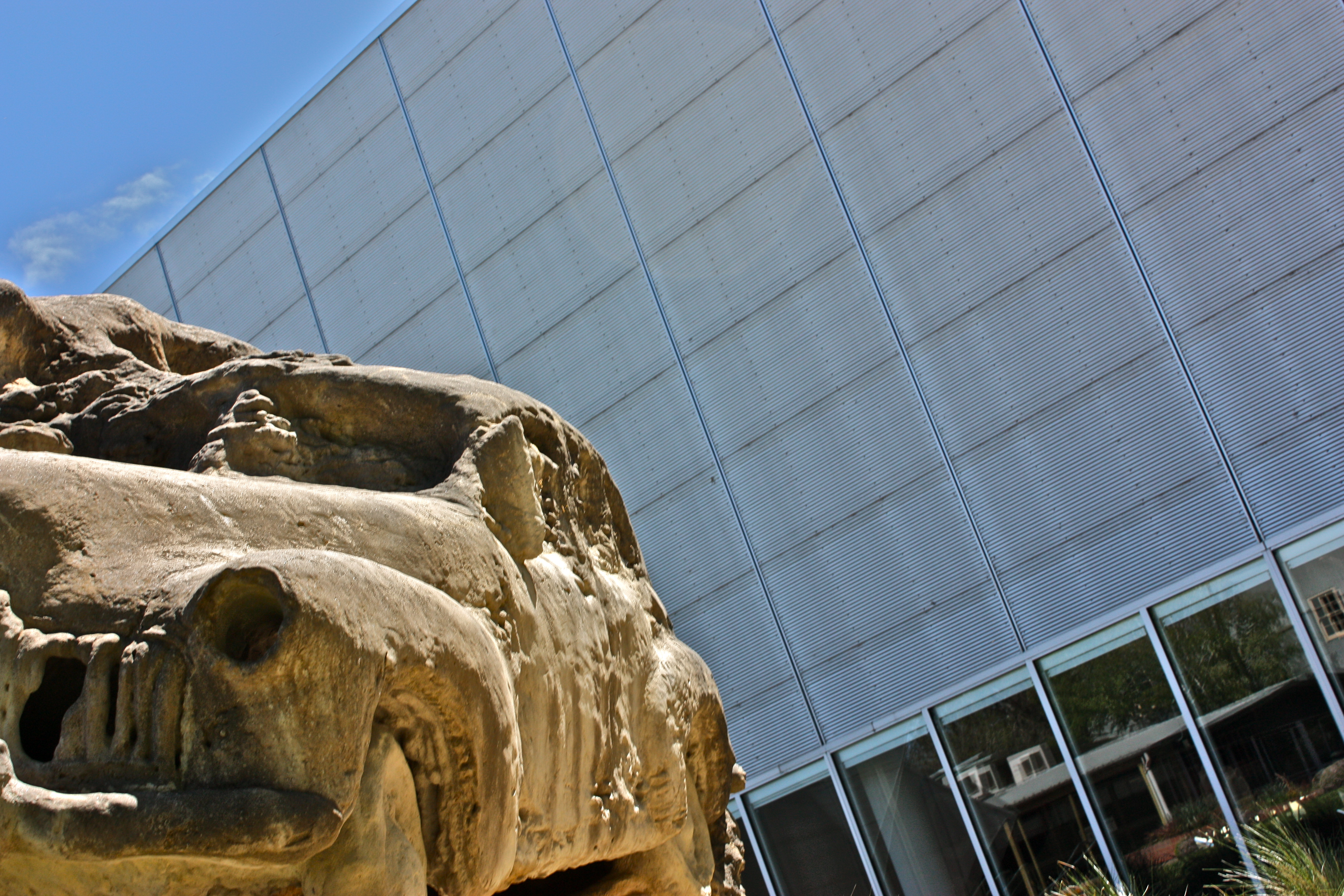
Tribute statue to the FJ Holden

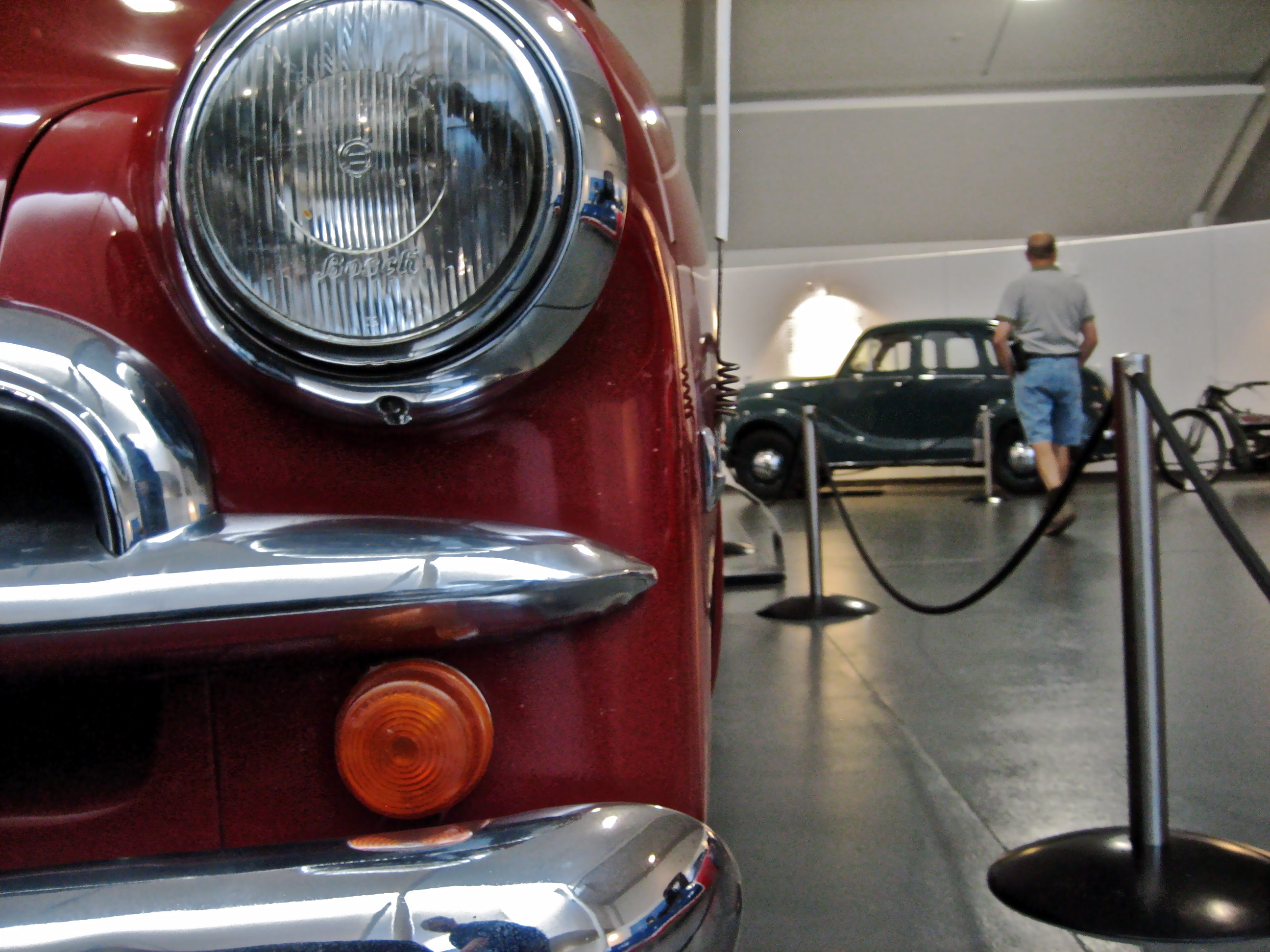
Display at the National Motor Museum

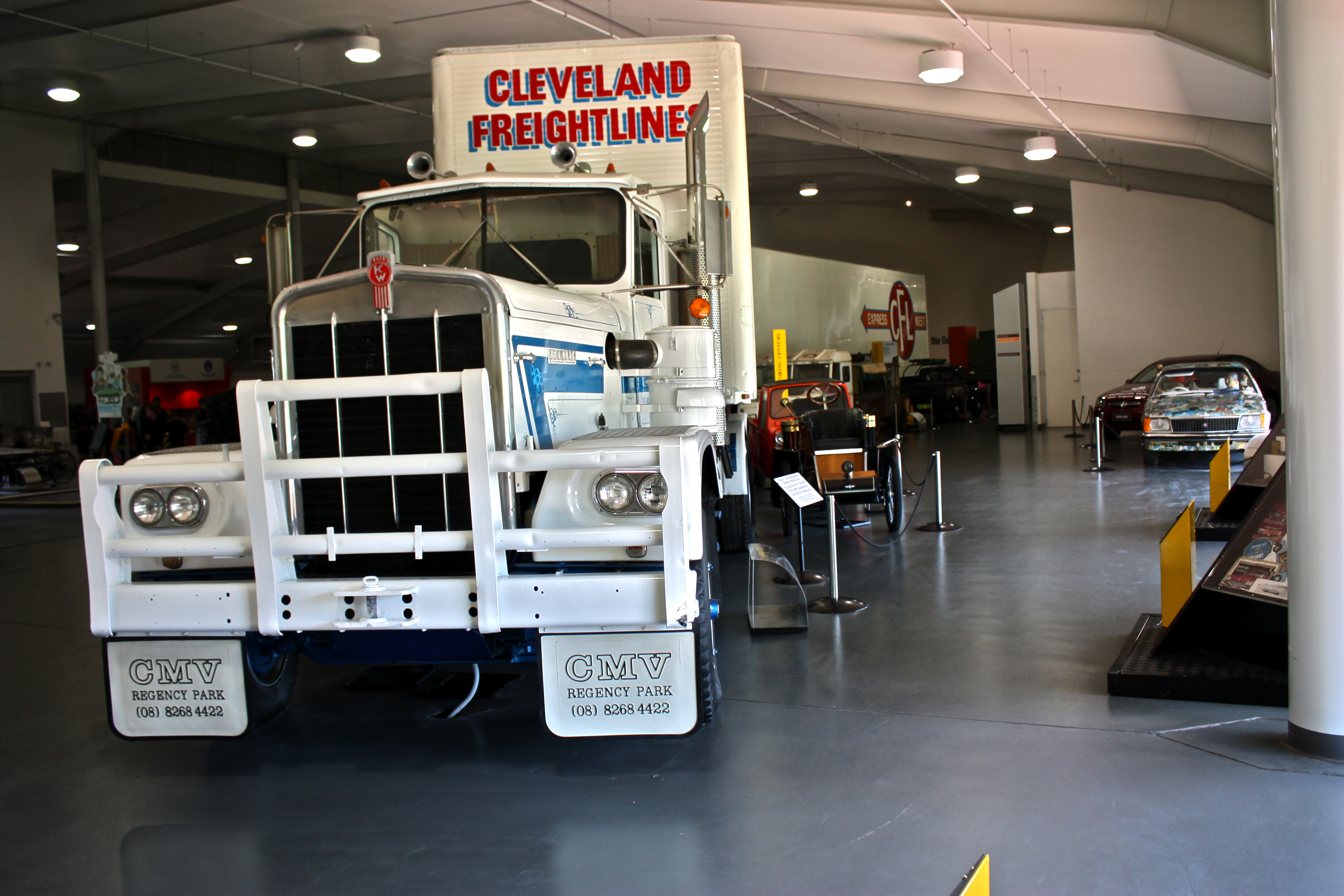
Full length road train at the Museum
