= Dutton family of South Australia =

The Dutton family of South Australia was established by Frederick Dutton, who "rose to distinction" from modest origins in Norwich, Norfolk, to leave a number of descendants who became prominent in Australia. ‘The family name was originally Mendes, but was changed by … Frederick Hugh Hampden Mendes to that of the family of the latter’s grandfather, who was descended from the Duttons, of Dutton, in Cheshire’.

== Family ==
Frederick Hugh Hampden Dutton
- Born: 3 February 1769; Norwich, Norfolk
- Died: 27 December 1847 (aged 77–78); Rotterdam, Netherlands
- Spouse: Mary Ann Norris (1781—15 December 1851)
- Children: Include: (William) Hampden Dutton (1805–1849), Frederick Hansborough Dutton (1812–1890), Francis Stacker Dutton (1818–1877)

British spy and informer; British agent, Cuxhaven, Hanover, Germany

Frederick Dutton Mendes, of Norwich, was father by his first wife, Elizabeth Pond, of Frederick Hugh Hampden Dutton (3 February 1769 – 27 December 1847).

== Frederick Dutton ==
Frederick Dutton (as he was known) was baptised in Norwich on 19 Feb 1769 as Frederick Hugh Hampden Dutton. His middle name 'Hampden' was given in honour of Robert Hampden Pye, who married Frederick's aunt, Jael Henrietta Mendes. His parents were both actors and so he travelled widely as a child. His mother died in December 1771, and was buried at Norwich. His father continued his acting career and later remarried.

Frederick settled near Newry in County Down, Ireland, where he kept a pub “without a licence” and embarked on a career noted for its unscrupulousness. He was employed, apparently as a valet, in the service of a Mr Carlisle, but was discharged on accusation of theft. At the time of the Irish Rebellion of 1798, he was recruited as a spy and "notorious" informer for the British Crown and is alleged to have perjured evidence at several celebrated State trials of United Irishmen, notably that of the Rev. James Coigly, leading to his conviction and sentence to death.

Dutton was promoted in the official service of the government when he was appointed by Lord Carhampton to the rank of quartermaster in the Royal Irish Artillery in 1795/6. He is also said to have had a position in the Revenue. He was posted as British Consul at Cruxhaven, Hanover, 1814–32, where he also held a position in the post office department and worked as an agent for the packet ships. He died at Rotterdam on 27 Dec 1847.

A biographical note appended to Richard Robert Madden's (he was later Colonial Secretary of Western Australia), The United Irishmen, Their Lives and Times states of him:

"In a letter from a settler in one of the most flourishing colonies of Australia, it is stated that Mr. Frederick Dutton obtained an official position in Holland, connected with the British government; that he was living about 1840 at Cruxhaven, married to a second wife, a step-daughter of the late William Pollock, Esq., of Newry, and holding some situation in the post-office department; that his sons went to Australia, speculated in mines, and became persons of great opulence and distinction there."

He married at Hanover on 30 August 1804 his second wife, Mary Ann (Pollock) Norris (b. Newry, Ireland, 1781; d. Ritzebüttel, near Cuxhaven, 15 Dec 1851). Their descendants are listed below.

== The Dutton Family of South Australia ==
- (William) Hampden Dutton (born in Colne, Lancashire, 29 October 1807; died Melbourne, Victoria, Australia, 21 November 1849) married Charlotte da Silva Cameron (1813 – 11 May 1885) on 2 July 1831 at St James Church, Sydney. Charlotte was a stepdaughter of Captain John Finnis (1802–1872) and sister of Charles Kingston's mother Catherina da Silva Cameron (1824 – 21 October 1851).

- Mary Broughton Rebecca Emma Dutton (1830–) born in Sydney.
- Mary Anne Elizabeth Dutton (1832–) born in Cobbitty – ) married John Taylor on 13 August 1857.
- Luduvina (often written Luduvine, Ludivine) Charlotte Jane Dutton (1833 – 14 May 1868) born in Sydney, married Dr. Robert Waters Moore M.R.C.S. (1819 – 6 December 1884) on 3 December 1851. Dr. Moore was the Colonial Surgeon.
- William Broughton Dutton (1838 – 27 June 1863) born in Sydney, died at North Adelaide.
- Charles George Cameron Dutton (1842 – 14 July 1887) born at Merri Creek, Victoria, died in Adelaide).
- Henry Dutton (1844 – 25 or 26 August 1914) born in Melbourne, died at Anlaby; married Helen Elizabeth Thomas (ca.1844 – 8 October 1901) on 10 May 1873. He inherited Anlaby Station from his uncle Frederick Hansborough Dutton. In 1907 he purchased the James Martin & Co. foundry and workshops in Gawler. He was owner of the steam yacht Adele.

- Ethel da Silva Dutton (3 February 1876 – 8 February 1892) died after fall from rocks, Granite Island.
- Henry Hampden Dutton (13 February 1879 – 15 June 1932) inherited 'Anlaby' in 1914. He married Emily Martin (13 November 1884 – 11 May 1962), daughter of John Felix Martin (14 August 1844 – 14 December 1916) of Gawler on 29 November 1905; their children included:

- John Hansborough Dutton (23 August 1906 – 1989)
- Richard Hampden Dutton (6 August 1909 – ) married Margaret Elizabeth Newland on 25 February 1933. Margaret was a daughter of Victor Marra Newland. He moved to Sydney and she divorced him in 1940.
- Bryony Helen Carola Dutton (22 October 1918 – 2005) was engaged to William Weatherly (Flying Officer with 459 Squadron and later awarded DFC) in 1940, but married American soldier William Robert Curkeet on 24 August 1942. She returned to South Australia in 1945; they divorced and she married the lawyer, Professor, later Sir, Richard Arthur "Dick" Blackburn OBE (26 July 1918 – 1 October 1987) on 1 December 1951. They had two children:

- Charlotte Blackburn, later Calder.
- Tom Blackburn SC.

- Geoffrey Piers Henry Dutton (2 August 1922 – 17 September 1998), noted writer, married Ninette Trott in 1944, they had two sons and a daughter; following his divorce in 1985, he married Robin Lucas in 1985.

- Zelie Adele Dutton (1846 – 12 Nov 1909) was born in Melbourne and died at her home, "Holbeche", in Barton Terrace, North Adelaide. She was charity worker for Christ Church, North Adelaide, friend of Dean Charles Marryat, secretary of Girls' Friendly Society, for many years lived with her sister and mother; her brother's yacht Adele was named after her.
- Ewin Wallace Cameron Dutton (1848 – 26 October 1864) born in Collingwood, Victoria, died at Glenelg

- Louisa Catherine (or Luise Catharina) Dutton was born in Colne, Lancashire, on 13 April 1809 (bapt. St Bartholomew’s, 15 April); she died in Hamburg on 12 October 1873. She married in Rotterdam, 1833, Friedrich Brödermann (1781-1865), a burgher and broker of Hamburg, and they had five children.
- Frederick Hansborough (or Hansbrow) Dutton was baptised in Colne, Lancashire, on 25 May 1813 and emigrated to New South Wales. He moved to South Australia, where with Charles Hervey Bagot, he ran a sheep station on the River Light, and later founded Anlaby Station. He left for England and died unmarried on 22 April 1890, leaving Anlaby to his nephew, Henry Dutton.
- Pelham John Richard Dutton was baptised at St Mary's, Lambeth, Surrey, on 3 August 1814. He was associated with the partnership of Thomas, Enscoe & James (George Thomas, John Enscoe and Nicholas James of Nicholas James & Co., 5 Lower George Street, Sydney) which chartered the Coromandel to carry sheep and cattle from Port Phillip to Western Australia in January 1841. Of the 1,100 head of sheep loaded on board, two- thirds died on the voyage due to lack of hydration. The partnership was dissolved in 1842, when Dutton was declared insolvent. He followed his brother William Hampden Dutton as consul for Hanse Towns at Sydney 1844 – 1847 and died in office at Hindley Street, Adelaide, on 11 April 1847. While living at Wambrook, Monaroo Plains, he married on 1 October 1839 Elizabeth Wilson (who married secondly Richard Willoughby Laws on 7 July 1849 and died in London on 26 January 1860), by whom he left two daughters:

- (Mary Ann) Emma Slade Dutton, born in Fremantle, Western Australia on 26 February 1841, she married Erasmus Coryton Roberts in England on 22 December 1863.
- Catherine Amalia Dutton, born 8 August 1842 at Tocal, New South Wales, on the Paterson River, she married Captain Mark Byatt Mayhew in 1863 at the church at Maker, Cornwall, near the border with Devon. She had six daughters and one son, and died in 1921.

- Charlotte Maria Dutton (born in Cuxhaven, Hamburg, 8 April 1816; died 9 May 1884) married Richard Sturenberg Cankrien, a businessman of Rotterdam.
- Francis Stacker Dutton C.M.G. (1818 – 25 January 1877) (seventh Premier and first Agent-General for South Australia) married Caroline MacDermott, or McDermott (c. 1822 – 1 June 1855) on 7 November 1849. Caroline was a daughter of Marshall MacDermott; her sisters were married to Justice Stow, Samuel Tomkinson, and John Taylor. And Rev. Brydges-Knight?

- Francis "Frank" MacDermott or McDermott Dutton (1850 – c. 9 May 1932)
- Caroline Birch Dutton (15 August 1852 – ) married barrister Charles Thomas Mitchell in England on 17 August 1878.
- Sir Frederick Dutton (14 April 1855 – c. 10 October 1930), solicitor of Wilkins, Blyth, Dutton and Hartley, married Beatrice Aimee Bridger MBE (1863 – 1 August 1928) in England on 20 December 1883.
