= Ridgway William Newland =

English congregational minister and pioneer

Rev. Ridgway William Newland (c. 1788 – 8 March 1864), frequently spelled "Ridgeway", was an English Congregationalist minister who with his large family emigrated to the young colony of South Australia, where he had a considerable influence in the Encounter Bay district. Many of his descendants were important in the history of the State. He has been called "The father of the South".

== History ==
Newland was the minister of an Independent (as Congregationalists frequently called themselves) church of Hanley, in the Staffordshire Potteries region of England, for around 25 years.

He emigrated to South Australia with his wife Martha, née Keeling, and their six children aboard the Sir Charles Forbes, arriving in June 1839. They settled in the Encounter Bay area, with a number of members of his congregation. He purchased a large property and after considerable effort established a successful farm. He built a church at Port Elliot.

He assisted T. Q. Stow at the opening service of the new Freeman Street (now a section of Gawler Place) chapel in 1840, and again at the opening of the new Franklin Street schoolhouse in January 1845.

He left to visit England early January 1845, perhaps on the Palmyra, and returned aboard the Kingston in January 1846, accompanied by a son.

He died of injuries sustained when the mail coach in which he was travelling capsized and all passengers were thrown out.

== Recognition ==
The first Newland Memorial Church was built in 1868 and extended as the Hodge annexe, replacing the "Tabernacle" built by R. W. Newland.

A new Newland Memorial Church, built on land donated by Henry S. Newland, with a bequest from Simpson Newland, and designed by W. H. Bagot, was erected c. 1930 in his memory.

On 25 December 1838, on the eve of Rev. Newland's departure for Australia, he was presented with a pair of communion cups, still held by the Newland Memorial Church.

== Family ==
Rev. Ridgway William Newland (c. 1788 – 8 March 1864) was married twice: to Jane Sophia Benning ( –1826) then to Martha Newland, née Keeling (c. 1797 – 13 April 1870)

with first wife

- Watts Newland (23 December 1820 – 25 June 1913) married Fanny Hester Taylor (1834 – 10 October 1862) in 1853; he married again, to Margaret Egan (c. 1845 – 5 May 1908) in 1865. They were pioneers of Glencoe, then Hindmarsh Valley, later managed the Poonindie Aboriginal station, near Port Lincoln.

- Mary "Minnie" Newland (28 May 1854 – 17 March 1942) married James Keeling Wark (c. 1847–1886) on 2 November 1876, a son of Dr. David Wark. James was lessee of Rylands station, near Kapunda, South Australia; died after carriage accident.

- Catherine Wark (8 August 1879 – )
- Francis Newland Wark (14 June 1882 – )

- Robert Fredrick Newland (15 September 1859 – )
- Rose Ada Newland (14 April 1861 – May 1955) married John Hazel Kelly (1861 – 29 November 1939) in 1889, farmed at Riverton, retired to Woodville.

- Harold John Kelly (1890–1939)
- Ralph Newland Kelly (1892– )
- Hazel Mary Kelly (1893–1960)
- Rose Ada Kelly (1894–1981)
- Richard Watts Kelly (1896–1913)
- Fanny Hester Kelly (1898–1986)
- Margaret Adamson Kelly (1902–1987)

- Finetta "Fanny" Newland (23 July 1867 – 20 May 1920) married Herbert Horatio Oxley Hopkins (c. 1859 – 2 April 1944) on 27 October 1886. He was a son of Edward Hopkins of Eudunda and a teller, later manager with the National Bank of Australasia.

- Herbert Oxley Hopkins (6 July 1895 – 23 February 1972), their youngest son, was a noted cricketer.

- Watts Newland (c. 1871 – 13 November 1945), pastoralist, retired to Osborne Park, Western Australia, married Ivy Alma ?? in February 1922, separated 1929, divorced 1937.
- Margaret Cate Newland (16 June 1873 – 8 October 1953)
- William Benning Newland (4 November 1875 – 7 September 1971) married Winifred Fairey Evans ( – 1955) in 1907, lived at Mount Lyndhurst Station

- Clifford Benning "Cliff" Newland (6 September 1908 – ) married Janet Ada Penna (1915 – ) c. 1940, lived at Renmark
- Gordon Hubert Newland (21 December 1909 – 23 November 1919)
- Margaret "Peg" Newland (2 September 1912 – )
- William Colin Newland (9 October 1913 – )
- Lindsay Hamilton Newland (13 November 1915 – )
- Joan Winifred (27 June 1917 – )
- Betty Newland (9 March 1920 – )

- Martha Violet Newland (22 April 1878 – 30 September 1965) married Harry Martens on 15 August 1919
- Matthew Totham "Ben" Newland (5 January 1881 – 30 January 1917) married (Susannah Lucy) Joyce Jervois (1888– ) in 1913. He died as result of gunshot accident. Joyce was a grand-daughter of Allan McFarlane and a great-niece of Sir William Jervois. Later lived at Avenel Gardens, Medindie.

- Margaret Susanna Newland (22 March 1914 – ) reported as Margaret J Newland
- Nancy Benning Newland (23 October 1915 – )
- Ben Totham Jervois Newland (13 May 1917 – )

- Madelina Isabel Newland (6 June 1883 – 18 August 1958) married Edward Campbell Deland (1871–1962) in 1905, farmed at Blyth

- Ridgway William Newland ( – 7 July 1942) married Jessie Rose de Lacy (1863 – 12 February 1903) on 29 September 1885. He died at Port Augusta.

- (Hazel) Flora Ruby (14 September 1886 – 7 May 1888)
- (Rose) Ada Newland (28 December 1889 – ) married Alfred Samuel Herbert "Alf" Morley in 1910
- Ridgway James Newland (4 August 1892 – 25 April 1984) married Mary Ellen Rogers (1896 – ) in 1918, lived at Milang.

- Eileen Mary Newland (21 March 1918 – )
- Carmel Frances Newland (15 May 1920 – 10 November 1991) married Stanley George "Stan" Gordon (c. 1920 – 19 July 1992) on c. 1943
- Hazel Imelda Newland (2 September 1921 – 1999)
- Veronica Jessica May "Ronnie" Newland (1923 – ) married Gordon Roberts ( – ) in c. 1953
- Kevin Ridgway James Newland (3 October 1924 – ) enlisted 1944
- Patricia Kathleen "Pat" Newland (12 March 1926? 1925? – ) maybe married Alby Abbedan ( – ) in c. 1952
- Dorothy Newland ( – ) married Gordon Cross ( – ) on 13 November 1954
- Margaret Newland ( – ) married Bruce Jaensch ( – 1929) on c. 1956

- Blanche Jessie/Jessie Blanche Newland (4 May 1895 – 10 January 1979) married John Montrose Winton (1871 – c. 1 June 1954) on 15 October 1915. Both at South Gap station near Port Augusta.
- Margarete Flora Newland (25 November 1896 – 17 February 1960)
- Minnie Warna Newland (4 June 1899 – 21 April 1963)
- Kate Mary "Kathy" Newland (20 October 1900 – 1996)
with Martha

- Martha Newland (c. 1828 – 1 March 1901) married Capt. Philip Alexander Nation (c. 1819 – 14 October 1867) on 27 June 1854. He was harbor-master at Wallaroo
- Sophia Newland (c. 1830 – 28 April 1872) married Henry Field ( – ) on 23 May 1849, farmed in Western Australia.
- Simpson Newland (2 November 1835 – 27 June 1925) married Jane Isabella Layton (c. 1850 – 11 January 1939) on 12 September 1872

- Col. Henry Simpson Newland DSO, CBE (24 November 1873 – 1969) married Ellen Mary Lindon ( – ) on 14 July 1910

- Henry Ridgway Simpson Newland (3 May 1911 – 2001)
- Mary Isobel Hemery Newland (7 July 1912 – 1989) married Andrew Gosse Hay (1909 – 1974) on 31 March 1937
- Ursula Helen Newland (8 May 1914 – )

- Philip Mesmer "Phil" Newland (2 February 1875 – 11 August 1916) married Josephine Mary Ferguson ( – ) in 1905. He was a noted cricketer

- Philip Simpson Newland (19 June 1906 – 20 April 1923)
- Robert Thorburn Newland (12 November 1908 – 18 November 2004)
- Mary Josephine Newland (5 March 1910 – )
- Elizabeth Layton Newland (1912– )

- Victor Marra Newland (1876–1953) married Elsie Margaret Porter (1879 – 11 February 1950) on 20 April 1909. Their family included:

- Margaret Elizabeth Jean Newland (10 January 1910 – 1988) married Richard Hampden Dutton (6 August 1909 – 13 December 1940), son of Henry Hampden Dutton on 25 February 1933. She married again, to Sidney Downer (September 1909 – September 1969) on 8 September 1948. They separated around 1960.
- Elaine Newland ( – 1995) married Robert Henry Wreford (1909–1990) on 8 July 1936. He was managing director, G. & R. Wills from 1961; lived in North Adelaide.

- Dr. Clive Newland (1878 – 25 January 1919) married Marjorie Ringwood Hamilton ( – ) in 1903. He was killed when he rode his motorcycle into a railway train.

- Clive Hamilton "Tom" Newland (1904 – 1991)
- Rupert Simpson Hamilton Newland (6 June 1908 – 12 December 1930)
- James Hamilton Newland (6 July 1913 – 2003) married Mildred Florence Copping (1918 – 2003) on 4 August 1937 of Naracoorte and Lucindale

- Ralph Dimmock Newland (16 March 1880 – 20 September 1933) married Hazel Thornton Creswell (c. 1887 – 4 November 1915) on 7 June 1909. He married Mildred Faith Dinning in 1930, farmed at Watervale.

- John Creswell Newland (3 March 1910 – 1991) married Margaret Leonie Martin ( –2007) in 1936
- Basil Creswell Newland (21 January 1913 – 1985) married Constance Mary Austin ( –2004) on 3 February 1940. He was champion fencer and horseman
- Dr. Malcolm Creswell Newland (2 October 1915 – 2007) married Joan Cuthbert Emery (1913–1999) on 3 February 1940.

- William Newland (c. 1831 – 23 November 1874) married Abbie Lowe ( – 1881) in 1862, introvert.

- Edith Keeling Newland (16 November 1862 – 1887)
- Kate Lilian (4 September 1864 – 1873)
- Ellen Gertrude Newland (19 October 1866 – 1881)
- Ethel Ashington Newland (15 January 1870 – 13 April 1917)

- Catherine Humphries Newland (c. 1834 – 20 May 1879) married Alfred George Webb (c. 1836 – 17 October 1897) in 1858. He was auctioneer of Port Elliot, later manager of Ellerslie station, Adelong. He married again, to Mary Amelia, some 30 years his junior. He sued nephew Cyril D'Arcy Leaver for libel. Leaver had accused Webb of illicit relations with his adopted daughter Louisa Larpent. He died shortly after settling out of court.
- Sarah Newland (c. 1838 – 26 June 1922) married Frank Mart (c. 1834 – 7 March 1874) in 1857, lived at Port Wakefield. She married again, to Arthur Newton ( – 1925) on 12 October 1875.
- John Robert Lakeman Newland (c. 1843 – 30 July 1912) married Ellen Wilkie (c. 1844 – 10 January 1927) in 1866

- Philip Newland (10 April 1867 – )
- Edith Mary Newland (2 February 1869 – 1907)
- Robert Newland (9 June 1870–1871)
- Jessie Newland (11 February 1872 – )
- Euphemia Newland (8 December 1873 – 1877)
- Herbert John Newland (26 March 1876 – 1935) married (Annie) Orari Kelley ( –1955) in 1899

- Allan Herbert Newland (22 November 1904 – ) married Kathleen Ethel Stock ( – ) in 1937
- Cyril Lakeman Newland (10 March 1908–1992) married Halley May Holt ( –1995) in 1937

- Ellen Newland (10 April 1878 – )
- Frank Newland (28 October 1880 – 22 August 1965) married Ida Frances Bard (9 October 1887 – 1970)

- John Newland ( – )
- Edwina Bard Newland (1914–1980)
- Robert Bard Newland (c. 1916 – 2010) married Pearl Irene ??
- Frank Newland (1918–1978)
- Edward Wilkie Newland (25 June 1919 – 1930)
- Quentin Theodore Newland (1 May 1922 – 1997)
- Philip Lakeman Newland (4 November 1925 – )

- Ivy Louisa Newland (1883–1884)
- Louisa Newland (1 March 1883 – 1912)
- Ruth Newland (24 August 1885–1967) married Arthur Clive Duval (1891–1965) in 1916
- Dora Marguerite Newland (17 August 1888 – 1969)

It is unlikely that Richard Francis Newland was related: he was an Anglican and brother of an Anglican clergyman.
