= Herbert Hopkins =

Personal information
- Full name: Herbert Oxley Hopkins
- Born: 6 July 1895; Adelaide, South Australia
- Died: 23 February 1972 (aged 76); Milverton, Somerset, England
- Batting: Right-handed

Domestic team information
- Years: Team
- 1921–1923: Oxford University
- 1921–1931: Worcestershire
- FC debut: 1 June 1921 Oxford Univ. v Free Foresters
- Last FC: 25 August 1931 Worcestershire v Sussex

Career statistics
Competition	First-class
Matches	85
Runs scored	3,204
Batting average	22.40
100s/50s	4/10
Top score	142*
Balls bowled	266
Wickets	4
Bowling average	50.50
5 wickets in innings	0
10 wickets in match	0
Best bowling	2/23
Catches/stumpings	28/–
- Source: CricketArchive, 16 September 2007

Herbert Oxley Hopkins (6 July 1895 – 23 February 1972) was an Australian-born English first-class cricketer who played 85 matches between the wars. The bulk of these games were for Worcestershire and Oxford University, though he also appeared once for Harlequins. In minor cricket, he played for both Federated Malay States and Straits Settlements, where he was working as a doctor.

== History ==
Hopkins was born in South Australia, a son of Herbert Horatio Oxley Hopkins (c. 1859 – 2 April 1944) and his wife Fanny Hopkins née Newland (23 July 1867 – 20 May 1920). Fanny was a granddaughter of Rev. Ridgway William Newland and a cousin of Henry Simpson Newland. His father was an employee of the National Bank of Australasia at Eudunda, later at Woodville and Grange, and was captain of district cricket clubs in these locations.

Young Hopkins was educated at St Peter's College in Adelaide before going to Oxford. His studies were interrupted by The Great War, when he volunteered with the 7th Battalion, Liverpool regiment, was injured and repatriated to Australia. After the war he returned to Oxford, studying medicine at Magdalen College. He married Dr. (Margaret) Elinor Jones of Tunbridge Wells around 1927; they had two children. The couple were involved with malaria research in Malaya, and were in Singapore at the time of the Japanese takeover of the island, and were held at Sime Road internment camp for the duration of the war.

== Cricketing career ==
Hopkins played for St. Margaret's (Anglican, Woodville) church team and Woodville Cricket Club before leaving Australia. He made his first-class debut for the Oxford University against Free Foresters at The University Parks in June 1921. He scored 7 and 32 in a game which ended in a Free Foresters win despite an innings of 202 from Oxford captain R.L. Holdsworth. After three more university games Hopkins played the rest of the summer for Worcestershire, though his only substantial score was an unbeaten 60 against Lancashire in August.

During 1922 and 1923, Hopkins divided his playing time between his university and his county. In June 1922, in a 15-run win for Oxford over the Army at Oxford, he scored what was to remain his career-best innings of 142*, though he made only one other half-century that season. In early July 1923 he hit 100* for Oxford against Marylebone Cricket Club (MCC) at Lord's, and won his Blue when he appeared in the Varsity Match at the same venue a few days later, making 42 in a crushing innings-and-227-run triumph over Cambridge University. He ended 1923 with 729 first-class runs at 27.00, by some way his highest season's aggregate.

That marked the end of Hopkins' university cricket career, but he continued to appear, albeit somewhat irregularly, for Worcestershire over the next four seasons. In late June 1924, he scored 137 in a losing cause against Nottinghamshire at Trent Bridge, and in the same match picked up three of the only four wickets he ever took: those of John Gunn, Len Richmond and Fred Barratt. (His other wicket, claimed earlier that same summer, had been that of Glamorgan's Jack Mercer.) Hopkins scored just one more century — 122 against his old university in 1925 — although he got a start in a large number of innings without pushing on to fifties or hundreds.

After the 1927 season, Hopkins ceased to play English cricket because of his work as a doctor in the Malay States, although he played minor cricket for Straits Settlements as late as 1938, by which time he was well into his forties. The exception was 1931, when he turned out nine times for Worcestershire in the County Championship during a period of leave.

Hopkins acted once as wicket-keeper, for Worcestershire against Gloucestershire at Clifton College in 1921.

His uncle, Bert Hopkins, played 20 Tests for Australia; while another uncle, Cyril Hopkins, had nine games for Otago.
