= Ninette Dutton =

Australian artist, broadcaster and author (1923–2007)

- Born: Ninette Clarice Florence Trott; 24 July 1923; Adelaide, South Australia
- Died: 7 July 2007, aged 83; Blue Mountains, New South Wales, Australia

Ninette Clarice Florence Dutton (née Trott) OAM (1923–2007) was an Australian artist, broadcaster and author.

== Early life and education ==
Ninette Dutton (nee Trott) was born in Adelaide, South Australia on 24 July 1923, the granddaughter of English portrait and landscape painter George A. J. Webb. Her father's family operated a dental practice, and her mother was a medical matron. She had two younger sisters.

Trott attended Creveen Girls School, North Adelaide, and Woodlands before studying social science at the University of Adelaide. She later studied at the Ruskin School of Art in the 1950s.

== Career ==
Trott began her career driving in the Women's Auxiliary Australian Air Force.

After marrying Geoffrey Dutton in 1944, the now Ninette Dutton set up an art studio in the Adelaide Hills In the late 1940s, primarily focusing on "firing painted designs on tiles".

During the 1950s, she worked in the Botany Library at Oxford.

While living briefly in Kansas, Dutton began enamelling on copper. Over the following four decades, her enamel works were widely collected, and she wrote Beautiful Art of Enamelling in 1966. Her works feature in collections across Australia, including the National Gallery of Victoria, the National Gallery of Australia, and the Orange Regional Gallery.

Over the 1970s, 80s and 90s she published books and delivered radio programmes on cooking, flowers, gardening and the seasons, and for some years she wrote a column titled 'The Passionate Gardener' in the Advertiser, Adelaide.

Dutton was awarded a Medal of the Order of Australia (OAM) in 1994.

== Personal life ==
Trott married Australian writer and historian Geoffrey Dutton in 1944. The couple lived in Melbourne, where they associated with Angry Penguins members, including Arthur Boyd, Sidney Nolan, Max Harris.

In 1946, the couple moved to Oxford, where Geoffrey studied English at Magdalen College, after which they purchased Ford Pilot and drove back to Australia. They settled in Adelaide Hills, with Geoffrey teaching at the University of Adelaide and Ninette focusing on her artwork.

In the 1950s, the Duttons travelled through Europe, Asia, Africa and the Middle East.

By 1962, the Duttons had two children and briefly lived in Kansas. However, following the death of Geoffrey's mother-in-law, Emily Dutton, in 1962, the Dutton family lived at Anlaby Station, the Duttons' family property near Kapunda.

In early 1968, she saved the life of Patrick White, a friend, by holding on to his arm when he fell into a blowhole on Kangaroo Island.

Anlaby Station sold in 1977, after which the Duttons moved to Eden Valley, where Ninette built a studio and served on boards in the local community, including the Arts Grants Advisory Committee and as a Trustee of the Board of Carrick Hill.

Following her divorce from Geoffrey Dutton, she moved to Canberra in 1997 and to Leura in 2002.

She died on 7 July 2007 in the Blue Mountains, New South Wales.

== Family ==
George Webb married Christina Elizabeth "Crissie" Lake ( – 19 January 1930), daughter of John and Jane Ann Lake and step-daughter of George Rolfe (ca. 1837 – 10 September 1919) on 4 October 1892.

Their children were:

- Clarice, married Leonard W. Trott DDS in April 1920, lived at "Deepdene", 23 Fitzroy Terrace, North Adelaide, then from 1936 "Carawatha", 3 Edwin Terrace, Gilberton, South Australia

- Ninette Clarice Florence Trott (24 July 1923 – 2007) married Geoffrey Dutton (2 August 1922 – 17 September 1998) on 31 July 1944. They had three children
  - Francis Dutton
  - Sam Dutton
  - Tisi Dutton
- Elizabeth "Helen" Trott (3 October 1926 – ) married Theodore "Bill" Bruce (1923–2002) on 1 October 1949. Bill, son of a prominent Adelaide auctioneer, was a champion athlete who competed in the 1948 (London) Olympic Games.
- Janet Myra Trott (3 October 1926 – ) married Geoffrey Richard Villiers (9 December 1924 – ) on 23 October 1948.

- George Rolfe Webb (ca. March 1893 – ) was a corporal in the Australian Army and served for a time in Rouen, France, returning to Australia in 1918. He married and farmed at "Bonnington", Boorcan, Victoria (between Terang and Camperdown).

- Mary Florence ( – ) married Dr. Peter D. Graeme Fox R.A.N.R. of Nedlands, Western Australia on 6 February 1946

== Written Works ==
- Dutton, Ninette (1966), The beautiful art of enamelling : a text-book for beginners, Sun Books, ISBN 978-0-7251-0023-0
- Dutton, Ninette (1971), What's for breakfast?, Sun Books, ISBN 978-0-7251-0124-4
- Dutton, Ninette; Brissenden collection (1976), "Portrait of a year", Astronomy Now, vol. 3, Thomas Nelson (Australia), p. 17, Bibcode:1989AsNow...3...17A, ISBN 978-0-17-005089-0
- Dutton, Ninette (1982), An Australian wildflower diary, Rigby, ISBN 978-0-7270-1709-3
- Dutton, Ninette (1985), Wildflower journeys : with paintings, drawings and diaries, Macmillan, ISBN 978-0-333-40120-0
- Dutton, Ninette (1986), Presents from Your Garden, Nelson, ISBN 978-0-17-006765-2
- Ninette Dutton (1987), Probabilities short stories, North Ryde, N.S.W Angus & Robertson, ISBN 978-0-207-15375-4
- Dutton, Ninette (1988), An Australian gardener's notebook, Greenhouse, ISBN 978-0-86436-165-3
- Dutton, Ninette (1988), Gardening on a grand scale, Carrick Hill?
- Dutton, Ninette (1990), A passionate gardener : writes of nature, beauty and seasons, ABC Enterprises for the Australian Broadcasting Corporation, ISBN 978-0-7333-0047-9
- Dutton, Ninette (1995), Firing, Editions Tom Thompson, ISBN 978-1-875892-07-5
- Dutton, Ninette (2000), Home ([New ed.] ed.), Text Publishing, ISBN 978-1-876485-67-2
- Dutton, Ninette; Molonglo Press (2000), Which way the wind blew, Molonglo Press, ISBN 978-1-876827-06-9
