= Sidney Downer =

Australian journalist

Sidney Frederick Downer (15 September 1909 – 17 September 1969) was a South Australian journalist and sports writer, a member of the prominent Downer family, who was for three years a Japanese prisoner-of-war.

== History ==
Sidney was born son of James Frederick "Fred" Downer (1874 – 29 May 1942) and his wife Florence Way Downer née Campbell (1870 – 29 May 1942), daughter of Dr. Allen Campbell and first woman to gain a Mus. Bac. at Adelaide University. Fred was chairman of directors of Advertiser Newspapers Limited and a close personal friend of Keith Murdoch and editor Lloyd Dumas. Sidney was one of only two of their offspring to survive to adulthood; his talented sister Alleyne was to become the dearly loved wife of Henry Rymill.

Downer's parents were in London from 1915 to 1919, during which time he attended Berkhamstead Grammar School, then returned to the family home "Glenalta" in Stirling West, South Australia. He followed his father and grandfather as a student at St Peter's College, expecting to follow his father into Law. He managed well enough academically, but excelled at games, particularly cricket, serving for several years as captain of the school's first eleven. In October 1928 he went up to Trinity College, Cambridge, where he failed his first year's examinations, and was recalled to Adelaide by his father. It was then he decided on a career in journalism, and in 1930 began working at the Melbourne Herald. It was there he met Melbe Roark (c. 1906– ), whom he married in 1932 and were to have two children together. He returned to Adelaide in 1933 to work at The Advertiser. In 1934 he was the recipient of a notorious newspaper story when stage personality Patricia Hackett took out her displeasure at a "mixed review" by slinging the contents of a bottle of ink over him.

With the outbreak of World War II Downer was posted to the Australian Associated Press office in London. In 1940 Sidney enlisted in England with the Royal Air Force, and was posted as a publicity officer with the rank of Flight Lieutenant in 1941 to Singapore. He escaped with others to Malaya following the fall of Singapore but was captured in Java and interned in Formosa (now Taiwan), followed by Manchuria. He was repatriated to England at war's end, then returned to Adelaide late in 1946, where he resumed working with The Advertiser as a sports writer, but his marriage to Melbe was over, to be replaced by the widow Margaret Dutton, daughter of Victor Marra Newland of Adelaide's prominent Newland family. Marital happiness was not to last however, and a few years later they separated, and Sidney took up with Dorothy "Doss" Anderson, née Clampett, whom he married in 1964.

He died in hospital, where he had been admitted suffering from pneumonia, a few days after his sixtieth birthday.

== Bibliography ==
- Sidney Downer, Patrol Indefinite (1963) a history of the mounted police of the Northern Territory.
- Sidney Downer, 100 Not Out: A century of cricket on the Adelaide Oval (1972)

== Family ==
He married Margaret Elizabeth Jean Dutton, née Newland, (10 January 1910 – 1988) on 8 September 1948. They separated around 1960. They had two children:

- John William Downer (15 May 1935 – ) married Christine Whitehead in November 1964, divorced 1976. He married again, to Rose ?? in 1979.
- Elizabeth Downer (17 May 1937 – ) married William Davidson, by whom she had three children. She married again, to Reginald Tolley.
