= Patricia Hackett =

Australian heiress, lawyer, actress and author

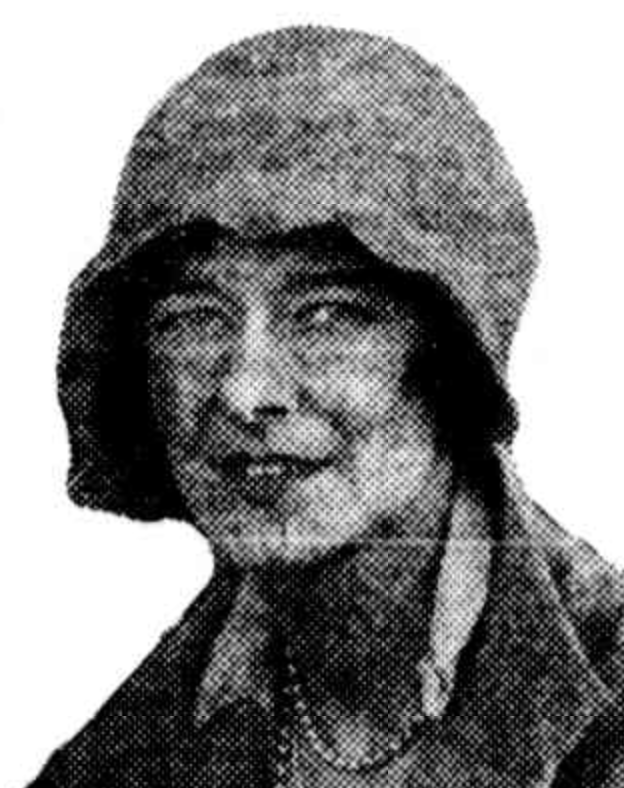
- Born: 25 January 1908; Perth
- Died: 18 August 1963 (aged 55); Hackney
- Occupation: Actor, writer, lawyer

Patricia Hackett (25 January 1908 – 18 August 1963) was an Australian heiress, lawyer, actress and author, remembered today in the Patricia Hackett Award for writing.

== History ==
Hackett was born in Perth, Western Australia to John Winthrop Hackett M.L.C. and his wife Dr Deborah Vernon Hackett, née Drake-Brockman, later known as Sir Winthrop and Lady Hackett. Sir Winthrop, who endowed the entire University of Western Australia, died on 19 February 1916 and Lady Hackett married again, on 10 April 1918 to Frank Beaumont Moulden (1876–1932) and moved to Adelaide with her children, living at "Lordello", Palmer Place, North Adelaide. He became Mayor of Adelaide in 1919 and was knighted in 1922. Lady Moulden married one more time, to barrister Basil Buller Murphy. She died as Dr Buller Murphy on 16 April 1965 at her home, also called "Lordello", in Kilsyth, Victoria, and was buried in Karrakatta, Western Australia.

Hackett began law studies at the University of Adelaide in 1925 without having passed in Latin, which was then a pre-requisite, and applied to enter her articles while deferring this examination. Another student, Claude Joseph Philcox, made a similar request, both no doubt intending to study the subject concurrently. This had for some time been permitted by the great English universities, but the application was denied. In 1926 Hackett and her sister Joan (23 February 1909 – 19 December 1966) were expelled from the University of Adelaide for impersonation at the Leaving examination in Latin. Joan had sat the Latin exam in Hackett's place.

Barred from further study in Australia, Hackett left for London, where was admitted as a student to the Inner Temple in May 1928, She graduated and on Monday 24 February 1930 was called to the Bar, along with fellow Australian Edith Ferguson Murdoch and three other women: Ruth Elizabeth Sophia Thompson of Weymouth, Dorset, England, Lucy See, daughter of See Tring Wak, of Singapore, and Ondan Kunathadathil Meenakshi, daughter of Ondan Raman, of Malabar District, India. None was expected to practise in England. Another newspaper asserted that she was called to the Bar on 27 January 1930, one of four women.

She returned to Adelaide with fellow-graduate (Note: Not literally: Lawrence was called to the Bar at the same time as Sylvia Fletcher Moulton, sister of Hugh Fletcher Moulton and daughter of Lord Moulton. Others called to the Bar at the same time were Margaret Wulfhilda Prothero, and Winifred Margaret Goode.) Margery Lawrence in late 1929, Not to be confused with the English novelist, Lawrence was a daughter of T. B. Lawrence of Earlswood Mount, Surrey. Hackett had dreams of the two going into practice together; she was adopted as a protege by Lady Moulden.

In 1933, as junior to Llandaff Brisbane Mathews (1896–1954), Hackett defended Salem Macksad, a Syrian storekeeper of Gilbert Street, who was accused of murdering his neighbour Richard Joseph Supple, with whose wife he had an illicit relationship. The victim was found on Memorial Drive near the golf course with a fractured skull the evident cause of death. Macksad was convicted of the lesser crime of manslaughter. This has been cited as the first time in Australia a woman lawyer has defended a male accused of a capital crime, but appears to be the only high-profile case with which she was professionally involved.

In 1936 Hackett was invited to do some legal work at Tulagi, Solomon Islands, and returned there for three or four months each year thereafter, staying on the island of M'Bangai on which she took out a 99-year lease (one authority asserts purchased). She took out a practising lawyer's certificate in Fiji, their first woman lawyer. Her last sojourn on the island was cut short by the Pearl Harbor attack of 1941, when she and many other Australians including Mrs. Ragnar Hyne and Mrs. W. H. Baddeley, wife of the Bishop of Melanesia, were evacuated.

The young lawyer Don Dunstan shared chambers with Hackett for a few years from 1952.

== Theatre and arts ==
Soon after her return to Adelaide, Hackett threw herself into amateur theatre. In April 1930 she appeared in the comedy The Truth About Blayds by A. A. Milne, with the Repertory Theatre Group, their first production at the Australia Theatre in Angas Street. She appeared in half-a-dozen further Repertory productions in the next three years.

In April 1934 she founded, and personally funded, in Gawler Place, "The Torch", Adelaide's first intimate theatre. The venue, seating 150 persons, was previously a sales showroom with an entrance on Claridge Arcade and stage access from Rundle Street via a narrow right-of-way. Membership was one guinea per annum, and entitled the holder to one seat per production and preferential purchase of additional seats for any performance. She created a minor furore in September 1934 after receiving an adverse critique in The Advertiser over her performance in Geza Silberer's play Caprice. (The News had, as usual, given her glowing, not to say sycophantic, reviews). Her response was to fling the contents of a bottle of ink over the hapless journalist Sidney Downer. Hackett then peremptorily barred all Advertiser journalists from her theatre. Later that year she took a long sea voyage "for her health", promising that "The Torch" would continue in her absence, but in fact it never reopened.

In 1938 she published These Little Things, illustrated by Rex Wood, a collection of poems about her life in Adelaide and in the Solomon Islands.

Hackett's acting was highly stylized, with an exaggerated gracefulness in the grand style, dominating every scene. She had a priceless collection of authentic Eastern costumes and "hard properties", with which she lavishly decorated her productions, adding to their other-worldly atmosphere. In 1944, following her appearance in Gild the Mask Again, Max Harris wrote in On Dit (the University of Adelaide student newspaper) a strident critique of Hackett's histrionic style:

We have now seen Miss Hackett as a Biblical dame, Virgin Mary, a Moon Woman, Salome, a Grey Sword, Queen Elizabeth, and a Renaissance wife. It only remains for her to play a Life of Stalin, Diaghilev and Little Nell. ... let the Theatre Guild forget the panther passions of the Hackett demi-monde ... [and place] ... more stress on Theatre and less on Art.

Hackett sued for libel. On the advice of John Reed, Harris made an abject apology, so avoiding a costly lawsuit. Worse was to attend him: this happened on the eve of his publication of the Ern Malley poems and the ensuing obscenity trials.

=== Theatre productions ===
Australia Theatre, Angas Street

- April 1930 The Truth About Blayds (A. A. Milne) as Septima.
- September 1930 The Man with a Load of Mischief (Ashley Dukes) as the prince's runaway mistress
- October 1931 Death Takes a Holiday as Grazia, Death's lover (Alberto Casella)
- October 1932 Berkeley Square (John L. Balderston and J. C. Squire) as the earlier Standish's soulmate
- November 1933 Cradle Song (Martinez Sierra) as Sister Johanna of the Cross
- December 1933 excerpts from Medea (Euripides) and Agamemnon (Aeschylus)

The Torch theatre, Gawler Place

- April 1934 Salome (Oscar Wilde) directed by Frank Johnston; Hackett as Salome, Cyril Riley as Herod and was well received.
- June 1934 The Virgin Unmasked (Henry Fielding) and Homage to the Unknown (George Preedy).
- September 1934: Caprice (Sil-Vara) This was the production which culminated in the notorious ink-slinging incident.
- August 1935: The Beaux' Stratagem (George Farquhar)
- October 1935: Shadowy Waters (W. B. Yeats) and excerpts from The Dream of Gerontius (Cardinal Newman).

At Adelaide University's "The Hut" theatre, Patricia directed:

- 1942 Variations in Verse
- 1943 The Medea (Euripides)
- 1943 Stories in Dance and Verse, co-directed with Joanne Priest
- 1944 Renaissance Night and Gild the Mask Again (T. B. Morris)
- 1945 The Motherly and Auspicious (Maurice Collis)
- 1945 And So To Bed (J. B. Fagan)
- 1946 The Beautiful One (T. B. Morris)
- 1947 L'Enfant Prodigue (Claude Debussy), co-directed with Jean Cook
- 1947 The Countess Cathleen (W. B. Yeats)
- 1948 The Old Ladies (Rodney Ackland)
- 1948 The Medea (Euripides)
- 1949 Legend (Patricia Hackett)
- 1949 Aglavaine and Sélysette (Maurice Maeterlinck)

She gathered around her a dedicated and faithful group of disciples, including Hedley Cullen (1915–1994), a baritone, Nancy Cullen (best known as a mezzo-soprano), Don Dunstan, Francis Flannagan (1912–), Mary Patricia "Patsy" Flannagan (1914–), Francis Gargaro, best known as Frank Gargro (1920– ), Ron Haddrick, Max Height, Audine Leith (née Cheek), Peter Leith, Kevin Manser (1925–2001), Stella Sobels (1900–1993), John Taylor, Iris Thomas and Lionel Williams.

Patricia later held theatrical performances in the basement of her home at 69 Hackney Road, Hackney, which she shared with Dr A. M. Mocatta (1887–1984). In later years she suffered from arthritis, relieved by heroin, to which she became addicted. After an hiatus of several years, one last final performance was held in 1960 at the Mocatta House theatre, in conjunction with the inaugural Adelaide Festival of Arts: Legend, a performance which included much of Hackett's own verse.

Mocatta inherited the house, which she left, along with her art collection, to the National Trust. Dubbed "Mocatta House", and whose history includes development by wine and distillation pioneer Wilhelm Nitschke, it was controversially sold in 1994, as later were the artworks.

== Other activities ==
In February 1932 she represented her father posthumously at a ceremony in Perth to present his bequest which founded the University of Western Australia. Lady Moulden was conferred with honorary degree of LLD., the first woman to be so honored in Australia.

In late 1934 Patricia took a sea voyage. She had a serious operation early in 1936, and in late March took a sea voyage to London with her little charge Elizabeth Kennedy (c. 1934– ), a niece of violinist Daisy Kennedy, later Mrs. John Drinkwater. Another report had her taking a voyage on a cargo boat with Mocatta. Whichever report was true, Patricia was in London in May.

She had a (summer?) cottage "Nepenthe" at Nortons Summit in the 1930s and 1940s, and spent many holidays prior to the Pacific War in 1941 in the Solomon Islands, living in Tulagi harbor on the island of M'bangai, on which she had a long-term lease. One report asserts that she had a legal practice in the Solomon Islands, where she was the first woman solicitor.

At the outbreak of World War II, she formed a Voluntary Service Detachment with several other professional women including Mocatta.

== Bibliography ==
- Hackett, Patricia; Wood, Rex (1938), These little things, Hunkin, Ellis & King Five illustrations by Rex Wood.

== Recognition ==
The Patricia Hackett Prize, endowed in her memory, has been awarded by the University of Western Australia to the best original contribution to Westerly each year since 1965.

== See also ==
- List of first women lawyers and judges in Oceania
