= Mildred Mocatta =

Australian medical practitioner

Annie Mildred Mocatta (23 November 1887 – 15 February 1984), commonly referred to as Mildred Mocatta, was an Australian medical practitioner. A Jewish socialite, she is remembered as a philanthropist and collector of Australian art. Her name has frequently connected with that of Patricia Hackett.

== History ==
Mocatta was born in Sydney, daughter of George Vivian Voss Mocatta (died 1940) and his wife Emmeline Mary Gertrude Mocatta, née Hollingdale (died 1923). She was educated at Bessie Hooke's Woodstock School, North Sydney, and trained as a kindergarten teacher, teaching in several free kindergartens in the poorer areas of Sydney. (Note: This history is contradicted by the assertion that Mocatta was in 1902 among the first scholars of the Methodist Ladies' College, Adelaide. The reporter confused Dr Mildred Mocatta for Dr Ruth Mocatta, whose name was then Estelle Ruth Gault.) She moved to Western Australia, where she was appointed principal of Perth's second free kindergarten, in Marquis Street and, following Lillian de Lissa's lead, introduced Montessori teaching methods and equipment. She found a kindred spirit in Adelaide girl Constance Alice Finlayson (died 1969), who succeeded Ethel J. Donnell (born 1885, also from Adelaide) as head of the Kindergarten Union of Western Australia in 1914. Together they decided to gain medical credentials, and in 1917 enrolled for first year science subjects at the University of Western Australia. The following year, they switched to Medicine at the University of Melbourne, both graduating MB, BS, in 1922. They were registered together as medical practitioners in South Australia: Mocatta's first placement was in Adelaide, as junior medical officer at the Parkside Mental Hospital, while Finlayson became a resident medical officer at the Royal Adelaide Hospital.

While in Melbourne Mocatta was a member of the Lyceum Club, which she found congenial, so helped found a sister organisation in Adelaide in 1922, Mocatta serving as secretary to Helen Mayo's president. Finlayson was also a member, developing a close personal friendship with Mayo, and taking over Dr Violet Plummer's private practice in 1929, when the latter retired. The position of secretary was taken over by Rica Hübbe around 1928.

Mocatta took an interest in the assessment of intelligence in children considered below average by teachers and parents and served as honorary physician to the Kindergarten Union and in 1926 honorary pathologist to the Mareeba Babies' Hospital, responsible to Mayo. (Mocatta and Finlayson were still both honorary physicians to Mareeba in 1941.) She left the hospital in 1925 and established her own private practice, with financial help from her parents, and purchased a home on Robe Terrace, Medindie. She joined the SA Medical Women's Society (which organisation published The Hands of a Woman — brief biographies of 62 women physicians in the State, but otherwise maintained a media silence) in 1928.

Always interested in art, she began collecting works by Australian artists, Lloyd Rees in particular.

Around this time Mocatta developed a friendship with Patricia Hackett. In April 1932 Hackett was expected to fly to Perth with her mother, Lady Moulden, who was to officially open Winthrop Hall, but the death of Sir Frank Moulden intervened, so Mocatta accompanied Hackett in her place. Another time, in 1935, Mocatta flew to Perth with Lady Moulden for a brief visit. In 1934 Hackett, arts dilettante par excellence, discovered an unused basement in Gawler Place in which she founded the Torch Theatre, for her benefit (as producer or director) and for her multitude of admirers, including Mocatta. A few examples:

- June 1935. Joan and Betty Rayner, as "The Troubadours", presented items of folklore from a variety of cultures from around the world.
- August 1935. Charles Farquhar's The Beaux' Stratagem, produced and directed by Hackett, who also played Mrs Sullen, in her usual declamatory style. Basil Harford played Archer, one of the suitors, to good effect.

The theatre closed in 1936. In March 1936 Mocatta left for London, with Hackett as companion, Mrs H. M. Downey house-sitting her Robe Terrace residence. While in London, she was admitted to membership of the Royal College of Physicians (she has been reported as attached to the Hammersmith Hospital), and the pair returned to Adelaide in March 1937.

With the onset of WWII, Mocatta and Hackett became members of the Volunteer Service Detachments, and took leadership roles. In 1940 she was again appointed honorary physician to the Mareeba Babies' Hospital.

In 1940 Mocatta invited Hackett to move in with her while Hackett was renovating an historic residence she had purchased, at 69 Hackney Road, Hackney. They became joint owners of the property, and Mocatta has been mentioned as moving in, in 1950, however that address was given as Mocatta's residence in 1946, when her dog famously bit the postman. Besides her private practice as gynaecologist, during the early 1940s Mocatta also worked at the Royal Adelaide Hospital as assistant honorary anaesthetist. Hackett died in 1963, a feeble slave to heroin, which drug she had been taking for rheumatism pains. Sometime in the 1950s she re-started her Torch Theatre in the extensive basement of the house. She staged one last performance Legend in that space as her contribution to the inaugural Adelaide Festival of Arts in 1960.

Mocatta inherited the house, which became known as "Mocatta House". Mocatta, with Mrs Marchant as her live-in carer, lived on with increasing difficulty as glaucoma took over her eyesight.

Mocatta wrote a Will in 1981, leaving the house, along with her valuable art collection, to the National Trust. In 1994, shortly after Marchant's death, and against her express wishes, the house was sold, as later were the artworks.

== Postscript ==
Mocatta has been confused with paediatrician Dr (Estelle) Ruth Mocatta, née Gault (16 July 1892 – 27 August 1973), who married Mocatta's brother, sheep farmer Cecil Houlton Mocatta (11 March 1889 – 30 July 1954) in 1929. The couple left Adelaide for Hamilton, Victoria in early 1941, but returned in 1943 to take the position of medical director of the Mothers' and Babies' Health Association.

Dr Frances Mocatta, daughter of G. O. Mocatta, practised in Adelaide for a time before marrying William Dean in August 1947, and moving to Meredith, Victoria. There is no reason to believe she was related.
