= Paving the Way: A Romance of the Australian Bush =

Novel by Australian author Simpson Newland

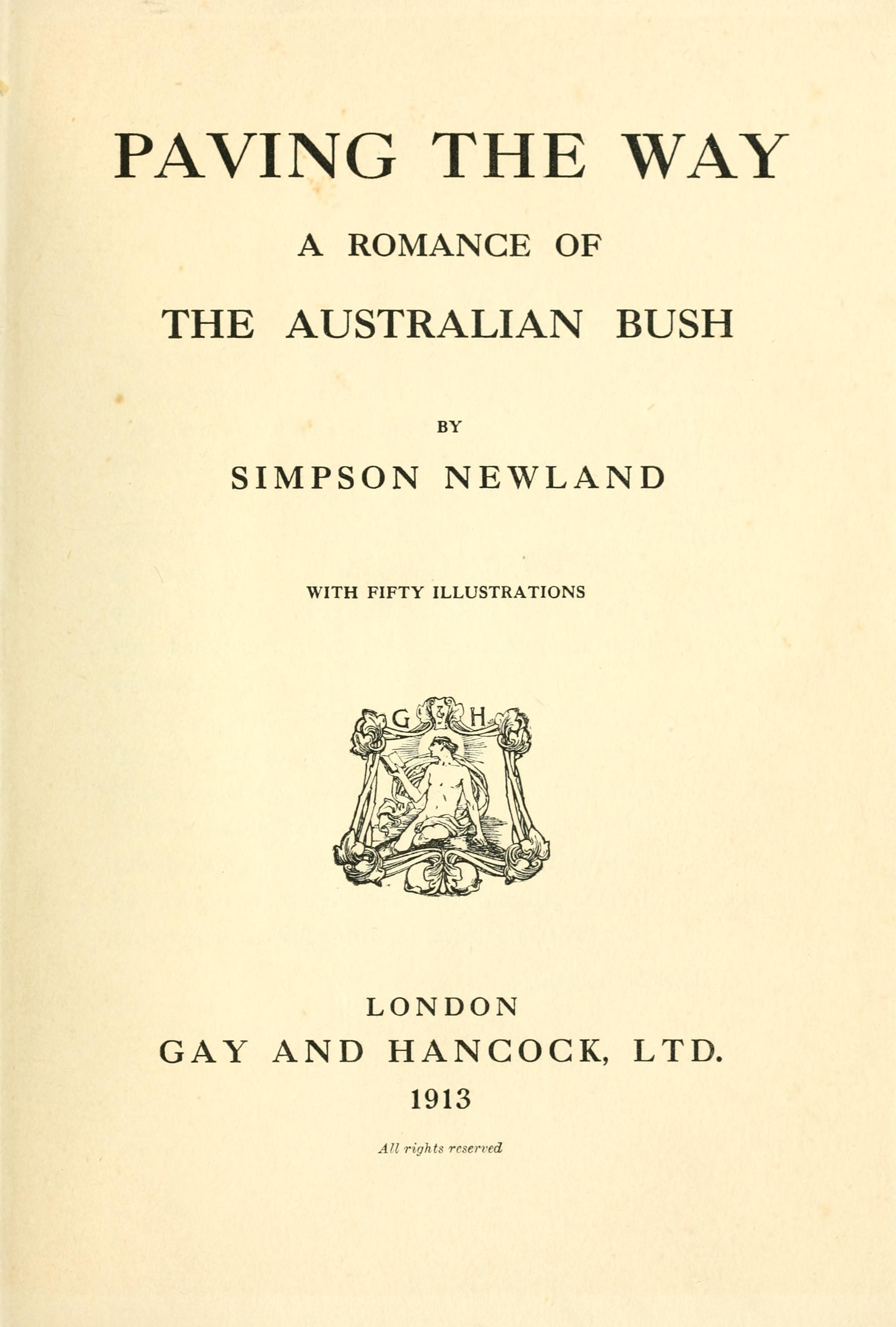
- Author: Simpson Newland
- Language: English
- Publisher: Gay and Bird
- Publication date: 1893
- Publication place: United Kingdom
- Pages: 376pp.
- Preceded by: -
- Followed by: Blood Tracks of the Bush: An Australian Romance

Paving the Way: A Romance of the Australian Bush is a novel by British-Australian settler and colonial politician Simpson Newland, accompanied by 25 full-page illustrations by Herbert Cole.

== Publication history ==
The novel was published as follows:

- Gay and Bird, London (1893), (1894), (1895), and (1898)
- George Bell & Sons, London (1898)
- Drexel Biddle, Philadelphia (1899)
- Gay and Hancock, London (1913), (1919)

== Bibliography ==
- Newland, Simpson (1899). Paving the Way: A Romance of the Australian Bush. Philadelphia, PA: Drexel Biddle.
- "Book Notice". Otago Daily Times. 16 January 1899. p. 3.
- "Gay and Bird's List". The Guardian. 7 December 1898. p. 19.
