= George Bell & Sons =

English publisher (1839–1986)

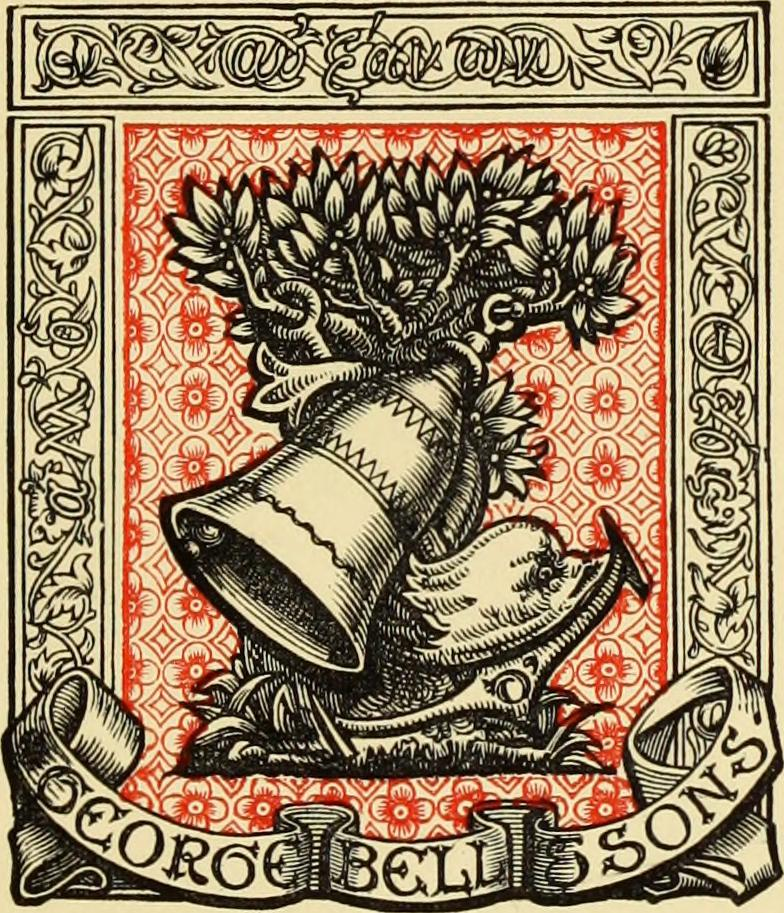
- Publisher's imprint of George Bell & Sons in French Architects and Sculptors of the XVIIIth Century (1900)
- Status: Defunct
- Founded: 1839; 187 years ago
- Founder: George Bell
- Defunct: 1986
- Successor: Unwin Hyman
- Country of origin: United Kingdom
- Headquarters location: London
- Publication types: Books
- Nonfiction topics: Education
- Fiction genres: Classics, children's literature

George Bell & Sons was an English book publishing house based in London. Founded in 1839 by George Bell, it published educational books, classics, children's literature, and works on art, architecture, and archaeology. In 1856, Bell entered into partnership with Frederick Daldy, and the firm traded as Bell & Daldy until 1873, when Daldy left and the business took the name George Bell & Sons.The firm later traded as Bell & Hyman and merged with George Allen & Unwin in 1986 to form Unwin Hyman.

== History ==
George Bell & Sons was founded by George Bell as an educational bookseller, with the intention of selling the output of London university presses. It became known as an independent publisher of classics and children's books.

One of Bell's first publishing investments was a series of Railway Companions, consisting of timetable booklets and tourist guides. Within a year, the publishing side of the business had outgrown the retail side, and Bell moved from his original offices to Fleet Street. The firm, then trading as G. Bell & Sons, expanded into books on art, architecture, and archaeology, as well as the classics. Bell was also associated with Henry Cole.

In the mid-1850s, Bell expanded into children's books, including works by Margaret Gatty (Parables from Nature) and Juliana Horatia Ewing (the Nursery Magazine). In 1854, he acquired J. & J. J. Deighton, a bookseller in Cambridge, which was renamed Deighton, Bell, & Company. In 1856, Bell entered into partnership with Frederick Daldy, and the firm was renamed Bell & Daldy.

With Daldy, Bell published poetry collections, including the Aldine Edition of British Poets and works by Andrew Lang and Robert Bridges. Bell also acquired the British rights to Webster's Dictionary. Bell & Daldy later took over the libraries of Henry George Bohn, a Covent Garden publisher, and moved to Bohn's former premises. With a larger publishing list, the Fleet Street retail location was no longer needed, and the firm left Fleet Street in 1867.

Daldy left the firm in 1873 to join Virtue, Spalding, & Daldy, and the company was renamed George Bell & Sons. In 1888, Bell left the management of the firm to his sons, Edward and Ernest, although he remained involved in the business until his death in 1890. In 1910, the firm became a limited liability company as George Bell & Sons, Ltd..

Edward Bell died in 1926. His son Arthur joined the board and became chairman in 1936. Other board members gradually took over the management of the firm, and Arthur died in 1968. In 1977, Robin Philip Hyman became managing director of Bell & Hyman, Ltd., and the firm moved to Queen Elizabeth Street, London. In 1986, Bell & Hyman Ltd merged with George Allen & Unwin to form Unwin Hyman. Unwin Hyman was acquired by HarperCollins in 1990.

== Addresses ==
- 1839: 1 Bouverie Street
- 1840: 186 Fleet Street
- 1854: Acquired Deighton's offices at Green Street and Trinity Street, Cambridge
- 1864: Acquired 4 York Street, Covent Garden. The previous occupant was the publishing company of Henry George Bohn; before that, the premises had belonged to the bookseller J. H. Bohte, who specialised in classics; and before that they had been the home of Thomas de Quincey.
- 1867: Moved out of Fleet Street
- 1903: York House, 6 Portugal Street, WC2, designed for George Bell & Sons by Horace Field
- 1977: Denmark House, Queen Elizabeth Street

== Selected publications ==
- Giorgio Vasari (1855–1864) The Lives of the Most Excellent Painters, Sculptors, and Architects
- Frederick Henry Ambrose Scrivener (1861) A Plain Introduction to the Criticism of the New Testament
- Mrs. Bowdich (1892) New Vegetarian Dishes
- Simpson Newland (1900) Blood Tracks of the Bush: An Australian Romance
- W. H. Besant (1900) Elementary Hydrostatics
- Irene Clyde (1909) Beatrice the Sixteenth
- Ralph Waldo Trine (1911) In Tune With The Infinite
- Duncan Sommerville (1914) The Elements of Non-Euclidean Geometry
- David Wooster, Alpine Plants

== Book series ==
- The Aldine Edition of the British Poets
- Alpha Classics
- Animal Life Readers
- Bell's Agricultural Series
- Bell's Annotated English Classics
- Bell's Cathedral Series
- Bell's English Classics
- Bell's Everyday Arithmetics
- Bell's Explorer Geographies
- Bell's Handbooks to Continental Churches
- Bell's Illustrated Classics
- Bell's Indian & Colonial Library
- Bell's Intermediate Geographies
- Bell's Miniature Series of Painters
- Bell's Novelist Readers
- Bell's Reading-Books for Schools and Parochial Libraries
- Bell's Sonnets Series
- Bell's Stages in Bookland
- Bibliotheca Classica
- Bohn's Libraries
- Bohn's Popular Library
- Cambridge Mathematical Series (some titles published jointly with Deighton, Bell and Co. of Cambridge)
- The Carillon Series
- The Chiswick Shakespeare
- Classics of Scientific Method
- The Connoisseur Series
- Easy Steps in English Composition
- Endymion Series
- Foreign Classics
- Grammar School Classics (jointly published with Whittaker & Co.)
- The Great Masters in Painting and Sculpture
- The Great Public Schools
- Life and Light Books
- Little Gem Poetry Books
- Handbooks of the Great Craftsmen
- Practical Designing Series
- The Queen's Treasures Series
- Shakespeare Retold for Little People
- York Library
