= 1904 SAFA Grand Final =

Australian rules football game

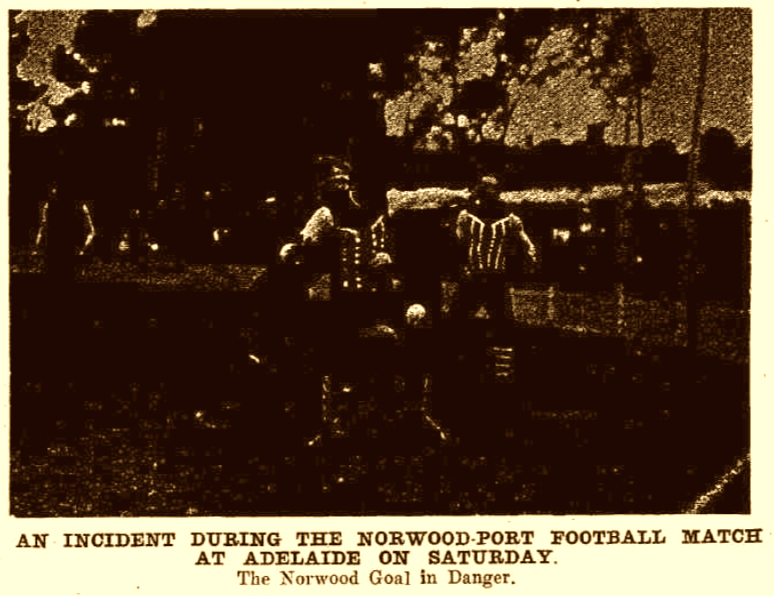

Norwood	Port Adelaide
9.8 (62)	8.10 (58)
	1	2	3	4
NOR	1.2 (8)	2.4 (16)	3.5 (23)	9.8 (62)
PTA	4.2 (26)	5.6 (36)	8.10 (58)	8.10 (58)
- Date: Saturday, 17 September (2:10 pm)
- Stadium: Jubilee Oval
- Attendance: 15,000

The 1904 SAFA Grand Final was an Australian rules football game contested between the Norwood Football Club and the Port Adelaide Football Club, held at the Jubilee Oval in Adelaide on 17 September 1904. It was the 9th annual Grand Final of the South Australian Football Association, staged to determine the premiers for the 1904 SAFA season. The match, attended by 15,000 spectators, was won by Norwood by a margin of 4 points, marking the clubs thirteenth premiership victory.

== Jubilee Oval ==
The 1904 SAFA Grand Final was the only instance of a South Australian state league grand final being held at Jubilee Oval. Jubilee Oval at the time was the host grounds of the Royal Adelaide Show.

== Match Summary ==
The 1904 Grand Final was a memorable one for Norwood who were down by 35 points at three-quarter time against traditional rival Port Adelaide. Norwood then produced an extraordinary burst of football with a goal by centre half forward Dean Dawson followed by two goals each from full forward, Bill Miller and half forward flanker, Stan Robinson. Norwood was only two points down with a minute remaining. Tommy Gibbons held a mark on a seemingly impossible angle. His kick sailed through the goal posts to give Norwood a four-point victory 9.8 to 8.10.

== Teams ==
Norwood
John Bahr	Leslie Cowan	Dean Dawson
Tommy Gibbons	James Gosse	Norman Gryst
Charles Gwynne	Lionel Hill	Roy Hill
Harold Miller	Jack Morrison	Phil Newland (c)
Stanley Robinson	Ernest Smith	Richard Townsend
George Webb		
Coach: Phil Newland

Port Adelaide
Harold Ashby	Lewis Corston	W Davis
Dempster	Joseph Earle	John Fletcher
Archibald Gosling	Matthew Healy	Richard James
Jack Mack	George Moore	H Phillps
John Quinn	Edward Strawns	Henry Selby
James Tompkins	Percy Whicker	
Coach: Jack McGargill
