= Henry Dutton (pastoralist) =

South Australian pastoralist

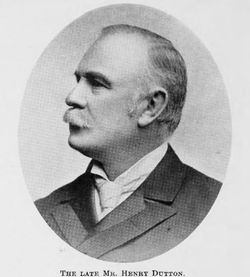

Henry Dutton (1844 – 25 August 1914) was a pastoralist in South Australia, known as the "Squire of Anlaby". He was the father of Henry Hampden Dutton and a grandfather of writer Geoffrey Dutton.

== History ==
Henry was born in Melbourne, Victoria, a son of (William) Hampden Dutton (1805 – 21 November 1849) and his wife Charlotte da Silva Dutton, née Cameron (1813 – 11 May 1885), a stepdaughter of Capt. John Finnis (1802–1872). Their families were notable in South Australian history; his uncle Francis Stacker Dutton was involved in the discovery and exploitation of the copper deposits near Kapunda and was later Premier of the colony.

His parents moved to South Australia in December 1838 and settled for a while in Mount Barker. Hampden persuaded his younger brother Frederick, who was then in Melbourne, to move to South Australia. This he did, in 1841 with the property "Koonunga" in partnership with Captain Bagot, then in 1843 acquired Finnis's 80 acres (32 ha) property 10 miles (16 km) north east of Kapunda, which he renamed Anlaby.

When Henry was five years old his father died; his mother either returned to, or remained in South Australia, living at Strangways Terrace, North Adelaide. Henry was educated at St Peter's College, and in 1869 was working as a clerk then teller for the Bank of South Australia, moving to Yankalilla around 1870, Brighton 1872, then around 1880 Mount Pleasant, where he was bank manager in 1890 when his uncle Frederick died, leaving him "Anlaby".

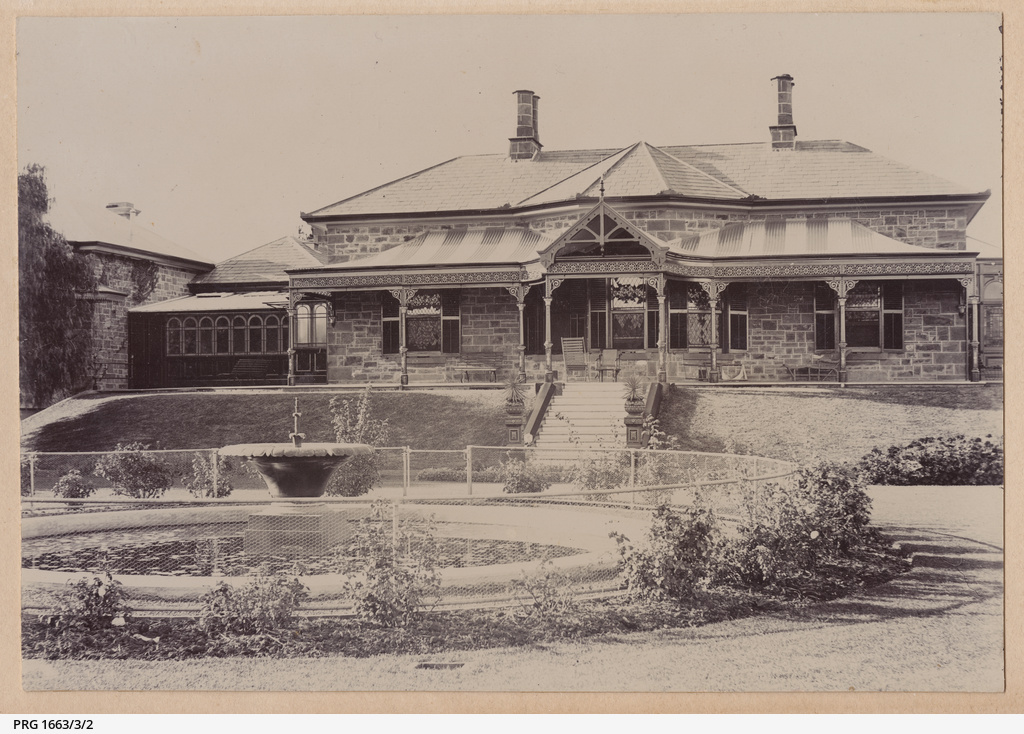
Anlaby Station, near Kapunda, home to Henry Dutton.

Henry put a great deal of effort into the development of the "Anlaby" residence. What had started in 1841 as a shingle-covered hut built by overseer Alexander Buchanan and his wife Penelope Ann, née Haddrick he developed into what has been described as a "mansion, set in delightful surroundings". The property decreased in size and importance over the years: part was subdivided for "closer settlement", then another tranche was acquired by the State government for "soldier settlement", but Henry also acquired additional property: North Booborowie, near Burra, in partnership with John Melrose, and Koonowla vineyard and orchard, on the road between Saddleworth and Auburn. He purchase Koonowla in 1906 for £10,000, and owned the estate until his death.

When James Martin & Company was liquidated in 1907, he purchased the business, and by enforcing some rationalization, kept the business viable within his lifetime, to the benefit of the town.

He died after a few days' illness, diagnosed as having a blood clot on the brain. He was buried at Anlaby.

== Yacht Adele ==
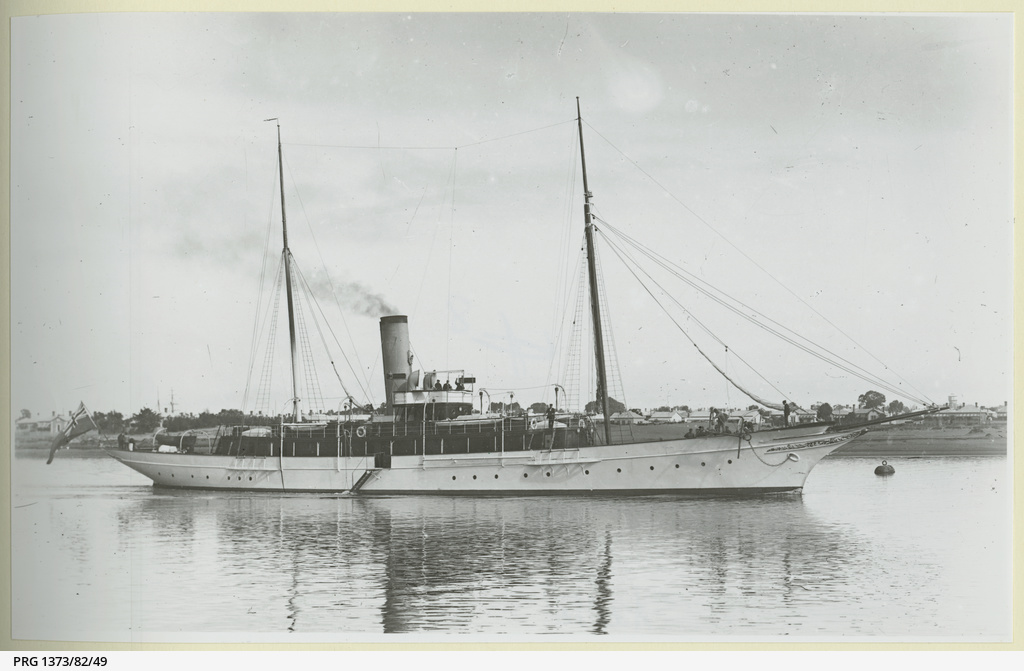
S.Y. Adele, owned by Henry Dutton.

Dutton was a member of the Royal South Australian Yacht Squadron. His steam yacht Adele, built for him by Hawthorn and Co., Ltd., was one of the finest pleasure yachts in Australia. The yacht's dimensions were:

L.B.P. 140 feet (43 m)
L.W.L 135 feet (41 m)
Breadth moulded 22 feet 3 inches (6.78 m)
Depth moulded 14 feet 3 inches (4.34 m)
Tonnage 340 long tons; 390 short tons (350 t)

The bulwarks were of steel, neatly paneled with teak and so arranged that they could be taken down when the yacht was laid up. Adele was fitted with steam and hand steering gear, teak and brass-mounted. The masts and bowsprit were of Oregon pine and the yacht was rigged as a schooner. There were eight cabins neatly paneled with polished hard woods, each containing lockers and drawers, dressing tables and wardrobes, and the wash basins had a hot and cold water supply. The guaranteed speed was 11.5 knots on a measured mile, and 11 knots for six hours. She carried four boats:

a 23 ft gig
an 18 ft cutter
a 14 ft dinghy
a 22 ft motor launch fitted with a Gardner engine and Gaines reversible propeller

Henry Way Rymill, for many years Commodore of the R.S.A.Y.S., was a godson of Henry Dutton, and recalled cruising with Dutton on Adele for three months every year. Adele was also on the register of the Royal Yacht Squadron at Cowes, and as Dutton was a member of it, he had the right to fly the White Ensign.

== St. Matthew's Anglican Church, Hamilton, South Australia ==
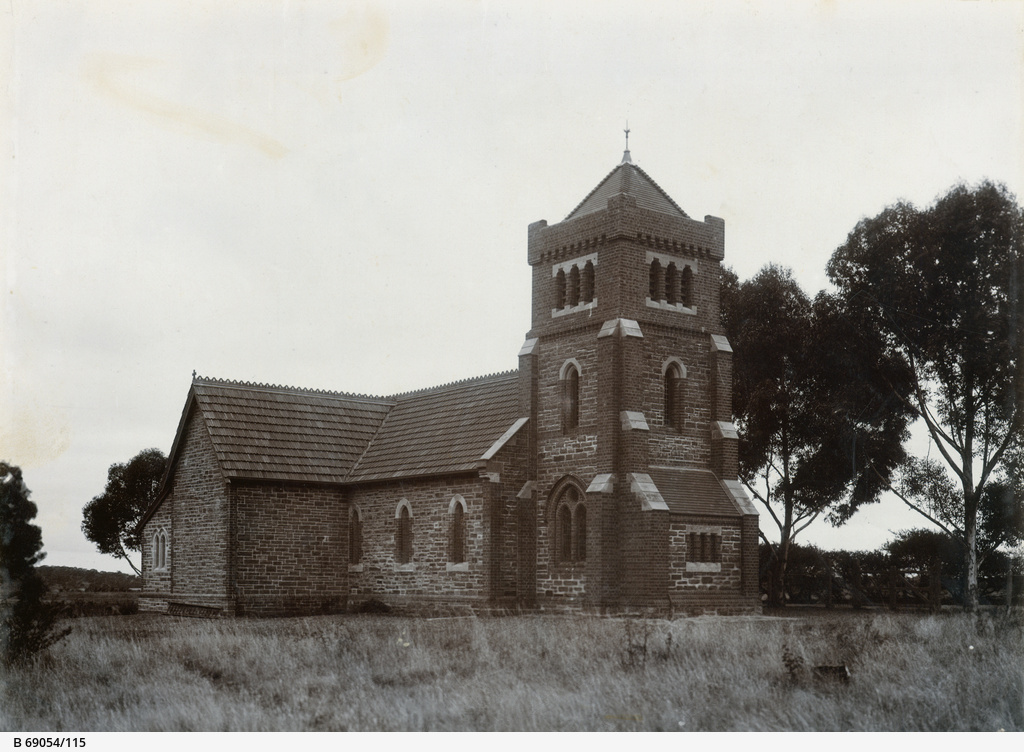
St. Matthew's Anglican Church, Hamilton

In 1896, Henry built a church to initially honour his uncle, Frederick Dutton, and daughter, Ethel da Silva Dutton, who died on 8 February 1892 after falling 80 feet from the rocks on the western side of Granite Island. Ethel was supposedly "searching among the rocks for a pocket knife when her foot slipped and she fell down a precipitous part of the Western Point and thence into the sea". At the time, it was said to be the first accident of its kind at Port Victor.

The church is situated at Hamilton, situated 8km west of Anlaby. Frank J. Naish was engaged as the architect of the original building, and E. James & Company, based in Kapunda, was contracted to build the church. The foundation stone was laid on 9 September 1896 by Henry Dutton, and the consecration was performed on 2 December 1896 by Bishop of Adelaide, John Harmer.

A marble tablet on the south wall bears the following inscription:

To the glory of God. and in loving memory of Helen Elizabeth Dutton, and Ethel Da Silva Dutton, the wife and daughter of Henry Dutton, of Anlaby, and Frederick Hansbrow Dutton, his uncle. This church was built and consecrated on December 2, 1896.

It was further beautified in 1902 and 1903, consisting among other things of a reredos and chancel screen of English oak, new altar rails, and symbolic scriptural paintings. In 1905, an organ chamber was added on the northern side, the organ being manufactured by Frederick Taylor, and dedicated on 11 December 1905.

In 1906-7, the chancel and nave was extended, and a tower was erected on the western side of the building, the base of which forms the baptistry. A font of pink marble was acquired for the church. The additions and alterations were consecrated by Bishop of Adelaide, Arthur Nutter Thomas, on 7 February 1907.

A new organ, the third in the building's existence, was first played on 25 October 1914 by Henry Dutton's daughter-in-law, Emily Dutton (née Martin). The second organ, made by Frederick Taylor, was considered unreliable. It was improved and altered before being sent to St. Oswald's Anglican Church, Parkside. The new one, purchased by Henry as a gift for the church, was constructed by J. E. Dodd of Adelaide. Henry never lived to see it installed.

== Other interests ==
Henry Dutton was a devoted Anglican, and while a bank employee supported the local Church: while living in Brighton he was a warden at St Jude's Church, Brighton and often served as organist.

Henry was a famously keen gardener. His passion sparked before his arrival at Anlaby: Henry received prizes for pelargoniums, begonias, bulbous dahlias, ferns, and more, at some of the annual shows held by the Mount Pleasant Agricultural, Horticultural, and Floricultural Society in the 1880s. He read up-to-date literature on garden practice and design and constantly sought to improve and expand his private collection. Inheriting Anlaby gave Henry the finance to invest heavily in gardening. One of his first projects was the construction of an enormous conservatory designed and built by A. Simpson & Son, based in Adelaide.

== Family ==
Henry Dutton (1844 at Melbourne – 25 or 26 August 1914 at Anlaby) married Helen Elizabeth Thomas of Geelong (c. 1844 – 8 October 1901) on 10 May 1873, at St. George's Church, Queenscliff, Victoria. They had two children:

- Ethel da Silva Dutton (3 February 1876 – 8 February 1892) died after fall from rocks, Granite Island.
- Henry Hampden Dutton (13 February 1879 – 15 June 1932) inherited 'Anlaby' in 1914, and is remembered for his motoring exploits. He married Emily Martin (1884–1962), daughter of John Felix Martin (1844–1916) of Gawler on 29 November 1905; their children included:

- John Hansborough Dutton (23 August 1906 – 1989)
- Richard Hampden Dutton (6 August 1909 – 13 December 1940) married Margaret Elizabeth Jean Newland (10 January 1910 – 1988), daughter of Victor Marra Newland, on 25 February 1933, divorced July 1940. She married again, to Sidney Downer (September 1909 – September 1969) on 8 September 1948. They separated around 1960.
- Bryony Helen Carola Dutton (22 October 1918 – 2005) was engaged to William Weatherly (Flying Officer with 459 Squadron and later awarded DFC) in 1940 but married American soldier William Robert Curkeet on 24 August 1942. She returned to South Australia in 1945; they divorced and she married distinguished lawyer Professor, later Sir, Richard Arthur "Dick" Blackburn OBE (26 July 1918 – 1 October 1987) on 1 December 1951. They had two children:

- Charlotte Blackburn, later Calder
- Tom Blackburn SC

- Geoffrey Piers Henry Dutton (2 August 1922 – 17 September 1998), a noted writer
