= Thomas Baden Morris =

English playwright (1900–1986)

Thomas Baden Morris (30 April 1900 – 22 January 1986) was an English writer from Godstone, Surrey who as both T. B. Morris and Yves Cabrol wrote a large number of plays, popular with amateur theatre groups.

Morris was a prolific playwright, with over a hundred one-act plays written. He has been compared with Philip Johnson (playwright) and David Campton, and has been remarked on for his large variety of styles and subject matters within his work. His "Yves Cabrol" plays are comedies set in provincial France.

Several of his plays were directed by Patricia Hackett for the University of Adelaide Theatre Guild in the 1940s: Renaissance Night, Gild the Mask Again, and The Beautiful One.

He died in Bristol in 1986.
