= Robin Hyman =

British publisher (1931–2017)

Robin Philip Hyman (9 September 1931 – 12 January 2017) was a British publisher who was the chairman of Laurence King Publishing from 1991 to 2004.

== Early life ==
Hyman was born in 1931 to Leonard and Helen Hyman (née Mautner). He was educated at Christ's College, Finchley. Between 1949 and 1951, he completed his National Service in the Royal Air Force, and then studied for an undergraduate degree in English at the University of Birmingham, graduating in 1955. He was the editor of the university's student magazine Mermaid for one year. Prior to University, he had spent some time working in the booksellers' business, particularly valuing the time he spent working for W.J. Bryce's bookshop in Museum Street, Bloomsbury. One of his colleagues at this time was Ivan Chambers, and Hyman later stated that he learned "more about new bookselling from Ivan Chambers than from anyone else".

== Career ==
=== Publishing ===
Hyman began his publishing career soon after graduating in 1955, securing a position at Evans Brothers that he had found through the Employment Group of the Publishers' Association. Hyman remained with Evans Brothers for 22 years, working in various positions and rising eventually to the post of Managing Director.

His first role at Evans Brothers was working on publicity for the education department, with an initial task of writing the blurb for the 1955 Year Book of Education. In 1956, he moved to the production department, of which he was made the manager the following year. In 1964, he became a director, having also had experience of editorial work within the company. He was then made Deputy Managing Director in 1967. He served as the managing director between 1972 and 1977.

In 1977, he became the chairman of Bell & Hyman. One of his proudest achievements was to publish the complete Pepys diaries. The company merged with Allen & Unwin in 1986. He served as the managing director of the new company, Unwin Hyman, until 1988, at which point he became its chairman and chief executive.

Between 1991 and 2004, Hyman served as the chairman for Laurence King Publishing.

=== Boards and councils ===
In 1975, he became involved in the work of the Publishers' Association, of which he was a member until 1992. He served in several executive positions, namely as treasurer (1982–1984), vice president (1988–1989 and 1991–1992) and president (1989–1991).

=== As author ===
Hyman is also the author of several works, most notably the compiler of A Dictionary of Famous Quotations (1962). He has also been the editor of other dictionaries, including the Boys' and Girls' First Dictionary (1967), the Bell & Hyman First Colour Dictionary (1985) and the Universal Primary Dictionary (1976). The Universal Primary Dictionary was compiled for use in Africa.

Together with his wife Inge, he has also written a number of children's books, including Barnabas Ball at the Circus (1967), Runaway James and the Night Owl (1968), The Hippo Who Wanted To Fly (1973), The Magical Fish (1974), Peter's Magic Hide-and-Seek (1982).

== Personal life ==
Hyman married Inge Neufeld in 1966, and they lived in the Hampstead Garden Suburb area of northwest London. They have two sons and one daughter. Hyman listed theatre, reading and travel among his interests and was a member of the Garrick Club, Samuel Pepys Club, and Marylebone Cricket Club. He was a Fellow of the Royal Society of Arts.

Hyman died in his sleep on 12 January 2017.

== Published works ==
=== Dictionaries ===
- The Modern Dictionary of Quotations (Evans Bros., 1962)
- Boys' and Girls' First Dictionary (Evans Bros., 1967)
- Evans First Dictionary (Evans Bros., 1976)
- Universal Primary Dictionary (Evans Bros., 1976)
- Bell & Hyman First Colour Dictionary (Bell & Hyman, 1985)

=== Children's books ===
All of the listed works were co-written with Inge Neufeld and illustrated by Yutaka Sugita, unless indicated otherwise:

- Barnabas Ball at the Circus (Evans Bros., 1967)
- Runaway James and the Night Owl (Evans Bros., 1968)
- Run, Run, Chase the Sun (Evans Bros., 1969)
- The Happiest Elephant in the World (Evans Bros., 1969)
- Three Bags Full: An Anthology of Nursery Rhymes (Evans Bros., 1972)
- Happy With Hubert (Evans Bros., 1972)
- The Hippo Who Wanted To Fly (Evans Bros., 1973)
- The Magical Fish (Evans Bros., 1974)
- Casper and the Lion Cub (Evans Bros., 1974)
- The Fairy Tale Book (Evans Bros., 1974)
- Casper and the Rainbow Bird (Evans Bros., 1975)
- The Greatest Explorers in the World (Evans Bros., 1978)
- The Treasure Box (Evans Bros., 1980)
- Peter's Magic Hide-and-Seek (Evans Bros., 1982)
