= Blood Tracks of the Bush: An Australian Romance =

Novel by Australian-UK writer Simpson Newland

Blood Tracks of the Bush : An Australian Romance
- Author: Simpson Newland
- Language: English
- Genre: Fiction
- Publisher: George Bell and Sons
- Publication date: 1900
- Publication place: U.K.
- Media type: Print
- Pages: 286 pp
- Preceded by: Paving the Way : A Romance of the Australian Bush

Blood Tracks of the Bush : An Australian Romance (1900) is a novel by British-Australian writer Simpson Newland. It was his second novel. It was originally published in the United Kingdom by George Bell and Sons in 1900.

== Abstract ==
"Arnold Wroithesley is heir to a heavily-encumbered English estate; to save foreclosure by his uncle (the mortgagee) Arnold, at his father's bidding, takes five thousand pounds of trust money, and goes to Australia, with the hope of making fifty thousand, so that he may save the ancestral domain...Drought ruins Arnold, who goes on a wild goose chase in Central Australia for an alleged treasure concealed in caves in a snow-capped mountain."

== Publishing history ==
Following the book's initial publication by George Bell and Sons in 1900 it was subsequently published as follows:

- Serialised in Evening Journal newspaper, 1900, Adelaide, South Australia
- Gay and Bird, 1900
- Gay and Hancock, 1919

== Critical reception ==
The reviewer in The Sunday Times, Sydney, noted: "As a melodramatic story of Australian back-block life this book is above the average in merit, and to those who can put aside probabilities as a necessary ingredient to fiction, it will prove highly interesting."

The Australian Dictionary of Biography noted that the book "was less successful [than his first novel], partly because inferior, but also because he courageously and accurately portrayed horrific mass-murders of Aborigines by police and pastoralists. The public was not ready for such honesty."

== See also ==
- 1900 in Australian literature
