= Emily Dutton =

Australian businesswoman (1884–1962)

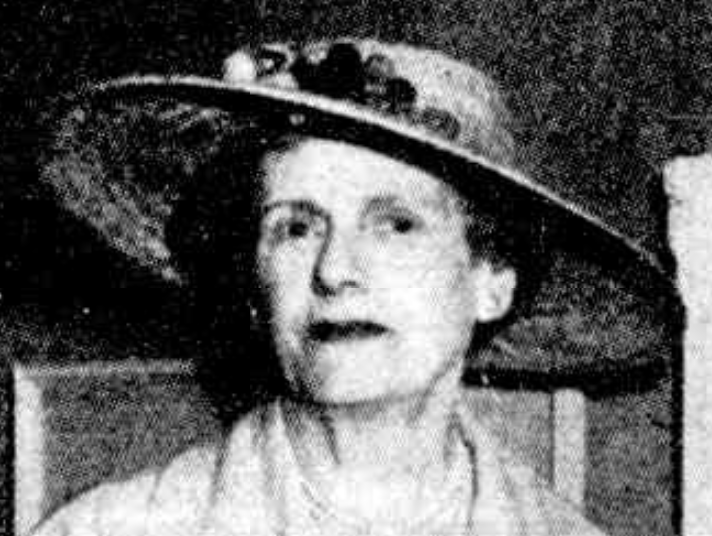
- Born: 13 November 1884; Gawler
- Died: 11 May 1962 (aged 77); Kapunda
- Occupation: Businessperson, community worker

Emily Dutton (13 November 1884 – 11 May 1962) was a businesswoman, musician and socialite of South Australia, wife of Henry Hampden Dutton. She was for many years manager of Anlaby Station and managing director of Anlaby Pastoral Company.

== History ==
Dutton was born in Gawler, South Australia, the daughter of John Felix Martin (14 August 1844 – 14 December 1916) and his wife Christina, née McNeil ( – 27 December 1931), who married in Gawler on 10 October 1879.

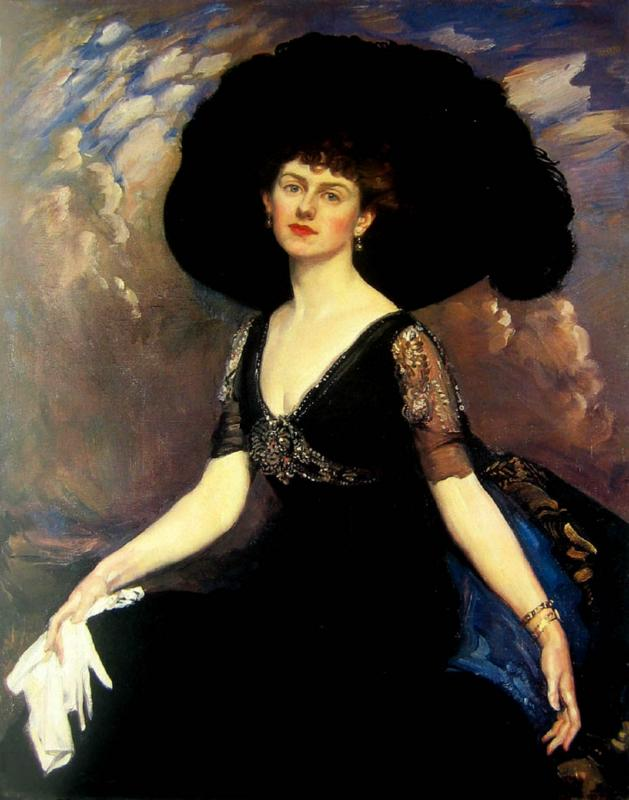
Mrs. Henry Dutton of South Australia, painted by G. W. Lambert, 1910

She was an accomplished musician, studying violin and piano under Mrs. Alfred Law of Denbigh Cottage and the Anglican Sisters' school at North Adelaide. The Martins regularly entertained at their home "Martindale" in Duffield Street, Gawler East, where Dutton learned the art of the gracious hostess. Cultivated, tall and strikingly beautiful, if somewhat austere, her name was frequently in the "Social Pages"; she was a fine catch for Harry Dutton, son of Henry Dutton (1844–1914), the "Squire of Anlaby". They were engaged in July 1905 and married four months later, on 29 November 1905. They took their honeymoon in Britain and Europe. They travelled a lot, and stayed at the best hotels. When the couple visited London in 1910, G. W. Lambert painted her portrait.

They were in England again when World War One broke out, and it was there that they received news of Henry's father's death on 25 August 1914. While stuck in London, Emily attended classes given by Sir James Cantlie on emergency nursing. They arrived back in Adelaide on Saturday 17 October and returned to Anlaby. A memorial service was held on Sunday 24 October at nearby Hamilton, in St. Matthew's Anglican Church, which, with its fine pipe organ, had been financed by the "Squire of Anlaby". Dutton played the voluntary and recessional and C. de N. Lucas presided at the organ during the service.

Her involvement with the arts never waned – she was a founding member of the South Australian Symphony Orchestra in 1920, and displayed considerable talent with the brush, exhibiting regularly with the Royal South Australian Society of Arts. She was described by her son, Geoffrey, as "an omnivorous reader".

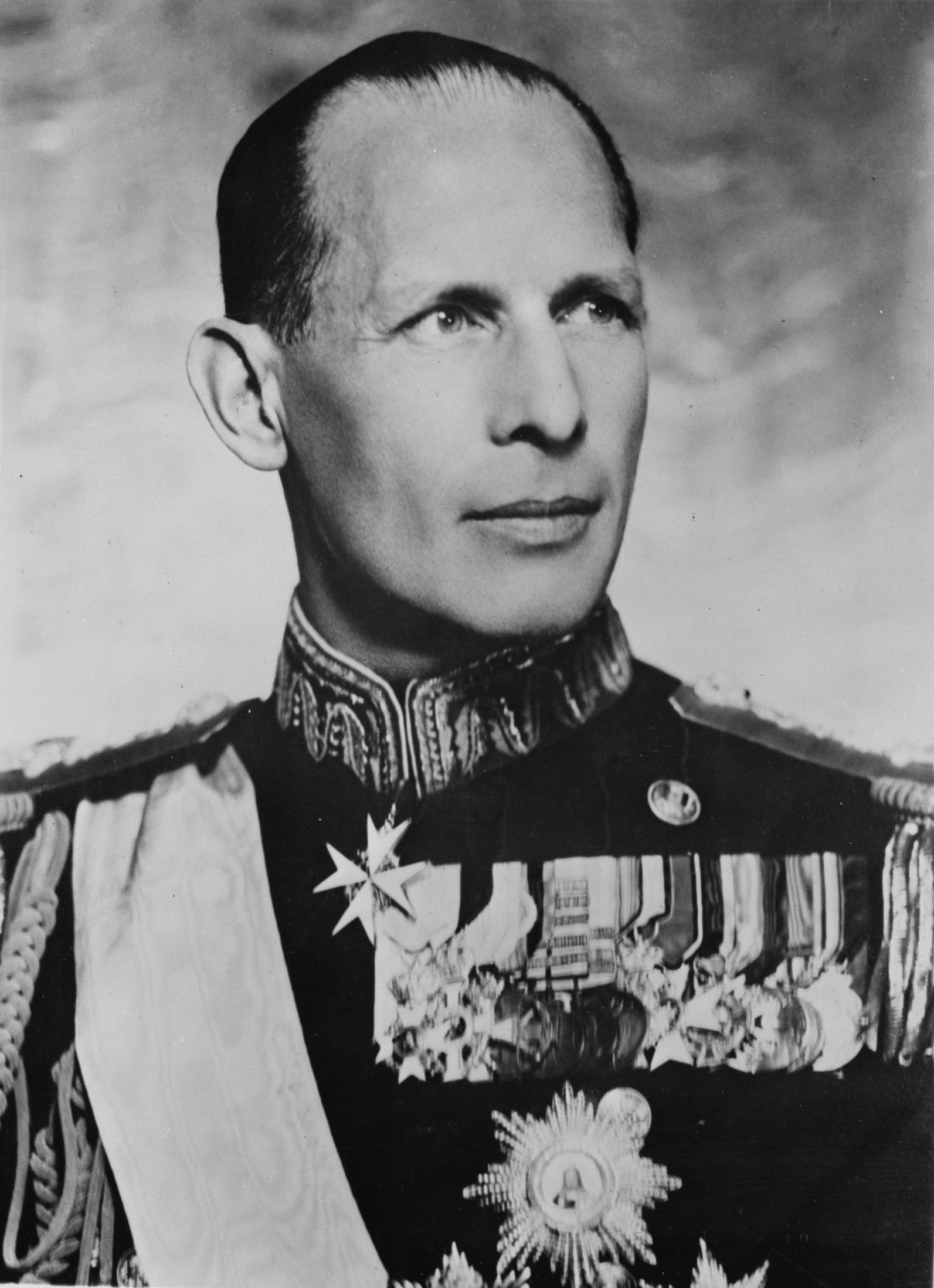
George II, King of Greece, was a long-standing friend of Emily Dutton.

Like her adventurous husband, Emily was a keen motorist. Following his historic drive from Adelaide to Darwin in August 1908, in 1921 the two of them motored from Oodnadatta to Katherine, around 1,400 miles (2,300 km), the rest of the journey from Adelaide to Darwin being taken by rail; she was the first woman to make that trip. The party consisted of two Dodge cars, the second being driven by the Duttons' chauffeur, a Mr. Brearley, and though arduous the trip was practically trouble-free; one broken spring and one puncture in the Dunlop "Railroad" tyres being the only damages incurred.

Emily and her husband accompanied Vilhjalmur Stefansson, Canadian-born Arctic explorer, as well as Edgeworth David, on an exploratory trip to Central Australia in 1924.

She made many friends, including George II of Greece, and the 5th Earl of Lonsdale, among the élite of Britain and Europe. Emily was holidaying there in 1932 with daughter Helen when her husband died at Anlaby, the same week of her court appearance in Buckingham Palace; where she again appeared the following year. She hosted a number of dignitaries at Anlaby Station, including Lotte Lehmann, Sybil Thorndike, Lewis Casson, Edward Hayward, and Hans Heysen. She once hosted Cynthia Spencer, Countess Spencer (paternal grandmother to Princess Diana) at Anlaby, and during the visit shot at a family of rosellas, with one landing in the Countess's tea cup.

Her acquaintances included the Pembrokes of Wilton; the actors George Arliss, Elissa Landi, Edna May, and Edna Thomas; sopranos Lina Scavizzi and Toti Dal Monte; composers Ignaz Friedman and Efrem Zimbalist; sculptor, Phyllis Archibald; women's rights advocate, Marie Galway; Girl's Guides Commissioners May Douglas and Shylie Katherine Rymill; and the last Queen of Italy, Marie-José of Belgium.

Her civic and charitable interests included the Australian Red Cross Society, of which she was a longtime divisional councillor, from 1937 assistant controller of the Voluntary Aid Detachment and from 1938 country supervisor for the Voluntary Service Detachment (both World War II service organisations) and district officer for the St John Ambulance Brigade.

She died at Anlaby on 11 May 1962 and was buried in the family plot, St Matthew's Church, Hamilton.

== Family ==
- Emily Martin (1884–1962) married Henry Hampden Dutton (13 February 1879 – 15 June 1932) on 29 November 1905; their children included:

- John Hansborough Dutton (23 August 1906 – 1989)
- Richard Hampden Dutton (6 August 1909 – 13 December 1940) married Margaret Elizabeth Newland on 25 February 1933. Margaret was a daughter of Victor Marra Newland. He was convicted of several serious driving offences, moved to Sydney and she divorced him in 1940; he died later the same year.
- Bryony Helen Carola 'Chibs' Dutton (22 October 1918 – 2005) was engaged to William Weatherly (Flying Officer with 459 Squadron and later awarded DFC) in 1940 but married American soldier William Robert Curkeet on 24 August 1942. She returned to South Australia in 1945; they divorced and she married distinguished lawyer Professor, later Sir, Richard Arthur "Dick" Blackburn OBE (26 July 1918 – 1 October 1987) on 1 December 1951. They had two children:

- Charlotte Blackburn, later Calder
- Tom Blackburn SC

- Geoffrey Piers Henry Dutton (2 August 1922 – 17 September 1998), noted writer, married Ninette Trott in 1944, they had two sons and a daughter; divorced 1985, he married Robin Lucas in 1985

== Sources ==
- Dutton, Geoffrey (1994). Out in the Open – An Autobiography. University of Queensland Press. ISBN 0-7022-2681-5. OCLC 611293112.
