= Henry Simpson Newland =

Australian surgeon (1873–1969)

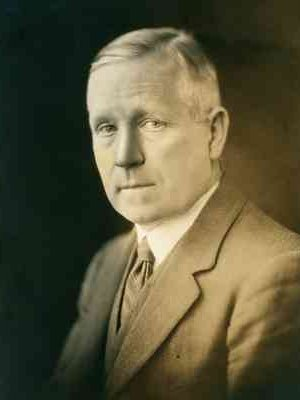
- Newland in c.1932
- Born: 24 November 1873; Kensington, South Australia
- Died: 13 November 1969 (aged 95)
- Military career
- Allegiance: Australia
- Branch: Citizens Military Force; Australian Imperial Force
- Service years: 1907–1910; 1914–1919
- Rank: Lieutenant Colonel
- Unit: Australian Army Medical Corps
- Conflicts: First World War
- Awards: Knight Bachelor; Commander of the Order of the British Empire; Distinguished Service Order; Mentioned in Despatches

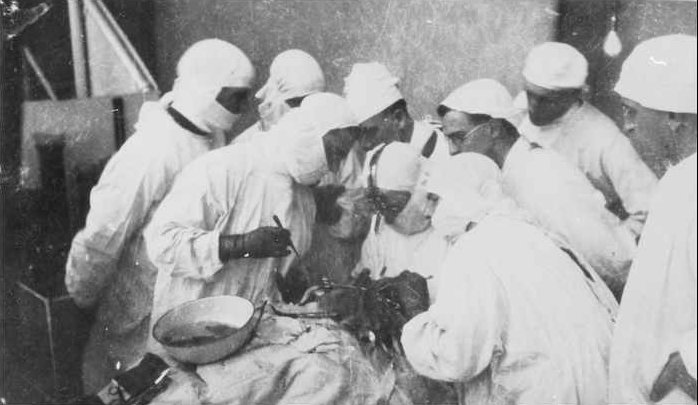
At work in the R.A.H., 1925

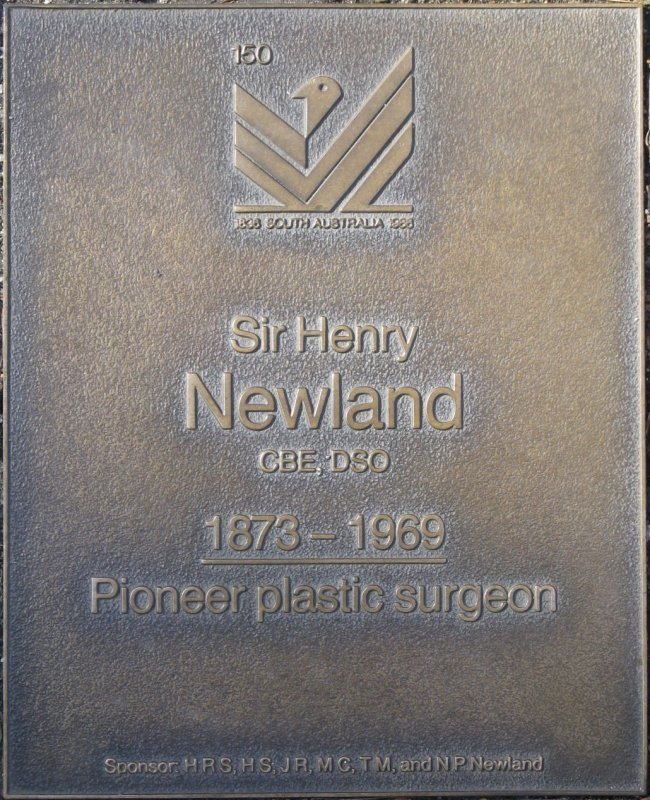

Sir Henry Simpson Newland, CBE, DSO, FRCS (24 November 1873 – 13 November 1969) was a distinguished Australian surgeon.

== Army career ==
Newland served in the Australian Army Medical Corps during the First World War.

== Other activities ==
As president of the Australian War Service League, he was active in promoting selective conscription and martial law during the Second World War.

In 1954 he was appointed an inaugural director of the oil company SANTOS.

== Recognition and legacy ==
Newland received many honours during his lifetime, including:

- Knighthood in the 1928 Birthday Honours
- Commander of the Order of the British Empire (CBE)
- Distinguished Service Order (DSO)
- Mentioned in Despatches

The Henry Simpson Newland Prize is named in his honour. The medal was first awarded by the Federal Council of the British Medical Association in Australia, and since 1956, by the Australian Medical Association.

He is commemorated by a plaque on the Jubilee 150 Walkway. A portrait of Newland by Ivor Hele won the 1953 Archibald Prize.

== Family ==
- Grandfather: Ridgway William Newland
- Father: Simpson Newland
- Brother: Victor Marra Newland
- Brother: Phil Newland
