= Phil Newland =

Australian sportsman (1875–1916)

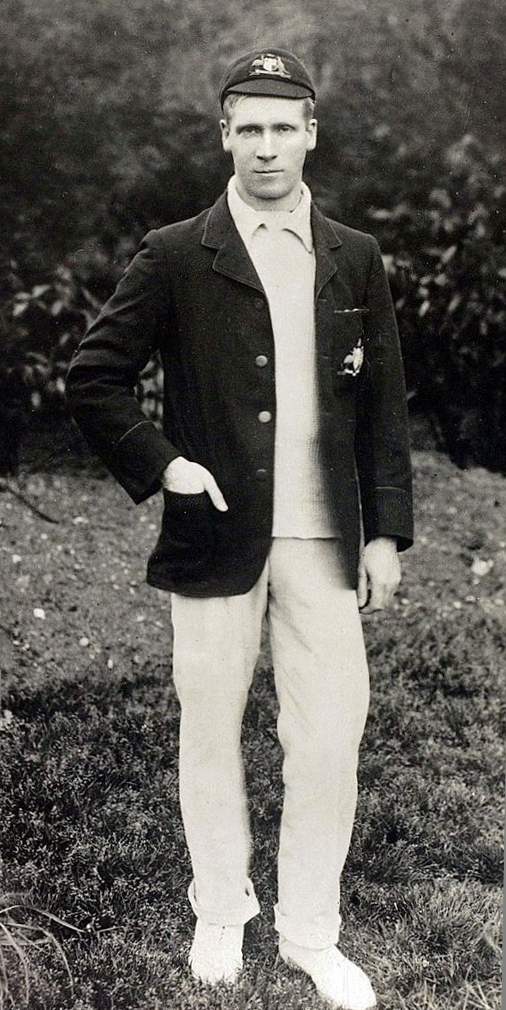
- Newland pictured in about 1905

Personal information
- Full name: Philip Mesmer Newland
- Born: 2 February 1875; Kensington, South Australia
- Died: 11 August 1916 (aged 41); Knightsbridge, Adelaide, South Australia
- Batting: Right-handed
- Role: Wicket-keeper

Domestic team information
- Years: Team
- 1899–1900–1905–06: South Australia

Career statistics
Competition	First-class
Matches	28
Runs scored	599
Batting average	18.15
100s/50s	0/2
Top score	77
Catches/stumpings	30/18
- Source: CricketArchive, 20 April 2023

Philip Mesmer Newland (2 February 1875 – 11 August 1916) was an Australian sportsman who excelled at Australian rules football, cricket and lacrosse. He played Sheffield Shield cricket for South Australia as a wicket-keeper and toured England with the Australian Test team in 1905.

== Life and career ==
Newland was a member of the noted Newland family of South Australia. His father was author Simpson Newland and he was the brother of surgeon Henry Simpson Newland and politician Victor Marra Newland. Phil Newland was educated at St Peter's College, Adelaide, and the University of Adelaide, where he studied law. He was called to the Bar in 1899.

Newland made his first-class and Sheffield Shield debut in 1899–1900 but had to wait over two years to make his second appearance. He took part in every Shield campaign from 1902–03 to 1905–06 and usually batted in the lower order. His highest score of 77 was made on the Adelaide Oval, in a 106 run ninth wicket partnership with spinner Robert Rees.

Up until 1904, when he retired from lacrosse, Newland represented South Australia in the sport and was earlier a leading player for Adelaide University. He was also an Australian rules footballer, playing with the Norwood Football Club in the South Australian Football Association. Newland captained Norwood's 1904 premiership team, which had come back from 35 points at the last change to win.

Newland toured England in 1905 as a reserve wicket-keeper and understudy to Jim Kelly. While in the United Kingdom he played in 10 first-class matches with the Australian team, but could only score 67 runs at 9.57 and effect 13 dismissals. His disappointing performances may have been as a result of an eye injury he received during the trip over, which was bad enough that he had to see an oculist in London. He had earlier, in 1904–05, toured New Zealand and played two matches against the national team. At that stage, New Zealand weren't a Test playing country so the matches had only first-class status.

Newland suffered from chronic poor health after the tour of England. He practised as a lawyer in the town of Balaklava, north of Adelaide, until his health deteriorated about two years before his death. He died at his home in Knightsbridge, Adelaide, leaving a widow and four children.
