= Simpson Newland =

Australian politician

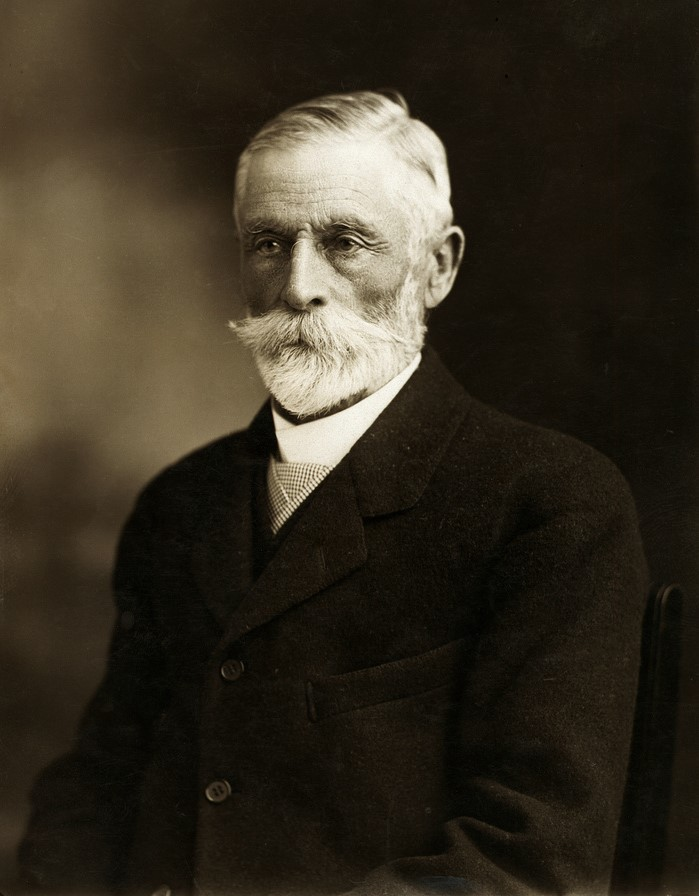
- Born: 2 November 1835; Staffordshire, England
- Died: 27 June 1925 (aged 89); North Adelaide, South Australia
- Occupations: politician, pastoralist and author
- Writing career
- Language: English

Simpson Newland CMG (2 November 1835 – 27 June 1925), pastoralist, author and politician, was a pioneer in Australia who made significant contributions to development around the Murray River. He was also an author of practical works and novels.

== Early years ==
Newland was born in Hanley, Staffordshire, a son of Rev. Ridgway William Newland (died 1864) and his wife Martha Newland, née Keeling (died 1870), who emigrated with their eight children to South Australia aboard the Sir Charles Forbes, arriving in June 1839. He and his siblings were educated to a high standard at home by their mother.

Simpson Newland became a competent stockrider and bushman.

== Pastoralist and prosperity ==
In 1864 Newland moved to a cattle station near Wilcannia on the Darling River, and developed an interest in the country's environmental history and indigenous population. By age 40 he had become very prosperous. On 12 September 1872 at Buckanbee, New South Wales, he married Jane Isabella Layton.

== Undelcarra ==
In 1876, with three sons, they moved to Adelaide and bought a mansion at Burnside which they called "Undelcarra"; Newland continued to manage the stations from Adelaide. George Debney was a leading furniture maker in Rundle Street and one of the first owners of the estate that was later known as Undelcarra. The estate stretched north from Second Creek, between Lockwood Road and Hallett Road up to approximately where Statenborough Street is now located. The Debneys lived on the property from the 1850s till 1877 when it was sold to Simpson Newland who significantly enlarged the house and called it Undelcarra.

Undelcarra belonged to Simpson Newland between 1876 and 1911. He is best known as author of the book Paving the Way, but was also a pastoralist from the River Darling area where his Marra Station had an out-station named Undelcarra which is said to be Aboriginal for 'under the hill with running water'. The estate passed into the hands of Torrens Ward, solicitor from 1911–1919. It was purchased in 1919 by Alfred Allen Simpson of A. Simpson & Co whitegoods manufacturers. The final subdivision was in 1969, but the house still stands in Undelcarra Road and is still owned by his descendants. The gatehouse, which is still on Lockwood Road near the bridge over Second Creek, was converted into a private residence and the main driveway re-routed to have access from Undelcarra Road. The gates that are now seen there were originally on Glynburn Road at the end of the driveway to the house Erindale.

== Politics and public life ==
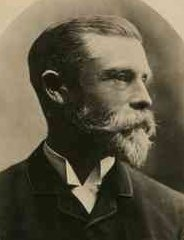
Simpson Newland ca. 1885 (aged 50)

He was elected to South Australia's House of Assembly in 1881 as the member for Encounter Bay.

== Author ==
In 1895 he produced several articles for the Adelaide Observer as part of that newspaper's "Old-time Memories" series: Some Aboriginals I have known, and A band of pioneers.

== Other interests ==
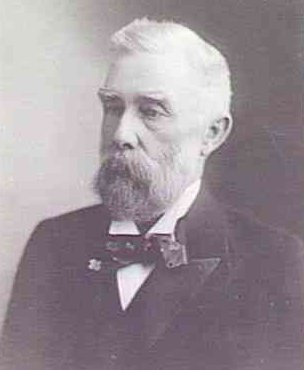
Simpson Newland ca. 1925

Newland had many interests. In 1895–1900 and again in 1920–22 he was president of the South Australian branch of the Royal Geographical Society of Australasia, and in 1906–23 president of the South Australian Zoological and Acclimatization Society. He deplored the European destruction of the environment and proposed that the Coorong area should be reserved for Aborigines and the land reforested. In 1922 he was appointed C.M.G. (Companion of the Order of St Michael and St George).

== Family ==
Newland died on 27 June 1925 at North Adelaide, survived by his wife and three of their five sons. His ashes were taken to his spiritual home, Victor Harbor, for burial.

Colonel Sir Henry Simpson Newland DSO, CBE (1873–1969), their eldest son, was an accomplished surgeon known for his public works and as a founder of the Royal Australasian College of Surgeons.

Philip Mesmer Newland (1875–1916) was an Australian sportsman who excelled at Australian rules football, cricket and lacrosse. He played Sheffield Shield cricket for South Australia as a wicket-keeper and toured England with the Australian Test team in 1905. He played Australian rules football with the Norwood Football Club and captained Norwood's 1904 premiership winning team.

Major Victor Marra Newland MC, OBE (1876–1953), their third son, had a distinguished military career, was a successful business man, a member of the stock exchange, and in the period 1933–38 represented North Adelaide for the Liberal and Country League in the House of Assembly.

Doctor Clive Newland (1878–1919), a graduate of London University, had a practice at Morphett Vale. He was killed in a railway accident, when the motorcycle he was riding collided with an oncoming train.

Ralph Dimmock Newland (1880–1933), their youngest son, represented South Australia at lacrosse.

== Bibliography ==
=== Novels ===
- Paving the Way: A Romance of the Australian Bush (1898)
- Blood Tracks of the Bush: An Australian Romance (1900)

=== Autobiography ===
- The Far North Country (1887)
- Old Time Memories: a band of pioneers (1895)
- Memoirs of Simpson Newland, C.M.G. Sometime Treasurer of South Australia (1926)

== See also ==
- Electoral district of Newland
