= Frank Beaumont Moulden =

Australian politician (1876–1932)

Lord Mayor of Adelaide
- In office 1919–1921

Alderman
- In office 1913–1919 and 1922–1932

Councillor on the Adelaide City Council
- In office 1904–1913

Personal details
- Born: 25 June 1876 Norwood
- Died: 8 April 1932 (aged 55) Brougham Place, North Adelaide, Australia
- Parent: Beaumont Arnold Moulden (father)
- Education: University of Adelaide
- Occupation: lawyer

Sir Frank Beaumont Moulden (25 June 1876 – 8 April 1932) was a lawyer in South Australia who served as Lord Mayor of Adelaide from 1919 to 1921.

== Life ==
Frank was born in Collett Lodge, Norwood, the second son of Beaumont Arnold Moulden and his wife Anna Mary Moulden née Cramond.

He was educated at St. Peter's College, and graduated LLB at the University of Adelaide, being articled to the legal firm Moulden & Son founded by his grandfather Joseph Eldin Moulden, and ultimately became a partner.

Moulden was elected a councillor to the Adelaide City Council 1904, became an alderman in 1913, and Lord Mayor from 1919 to 1921, during which period he hosted the Prince of Wales on his official visitor to Adelaide.

He was President of the local chapter of Alliance Française and in January 1919 succeeded J. W. Canaway as Consular Agent for France in South Australia.

He died at his home "Lordello", Brougham Place, North Adelaide, after a long illness.

== Recognition ==
- He was knighted in January 1922 in the 1922 New Year Honours.
- In June or July 1924 he was appointed officer of the Académie de la République française in recognition of his services to the French government.
- He was awarded a diploma of honor and bronze medal by the Ligue maritime et coloniale française.
- In 1930 he was made an officer of the Order of the Hospital of St. John of Jerusalem.

== Family ==
Sir Frank Beaumont Moulden married Deborah Vernon Hackett of Western Australia in 1918. They had no children, but Lady Moulden, née Drake-Brockman, had several children by her first husband, John Winthrop Hackett M.L.C. and mayor of Adelaide in 1919. Sir Winthrop, who died in 1916, endowed the entire University of Western Australia. One of their children was Patricia Hackett.

John Eldin Collett "Jack" Moulden (born 1873) of London was a brother, and Margaret Minna Moulden (born 1879), married John Wheeley Lea in 1902, later to Garnet Wolseley Bennett (died 1951) of Woodend, Victoria, was a sister. Youngest brother Eldin Swanzy Moulden (1883–1919) was Chief Assistant Engineer of the Municipal Tramways Trust under W. G. T. Goodman.
