= Voluntary Service Detachment =

Australian civil organization during World War II

The Voluntary Service Detachments were offshoots of the Australian Red Cross Society's South Australian and Western Australian divisions formed shortly before the outbreak of World War II. Their aim was to train and co-ordinate women volunteers as first aiders and civil defence personnel.

== History ==
Following a suggestion by Harold Thorby MHR, a committee was formed in December 1938 headed by Geoffrey Reed KC to formulate plans for a service. Within a week three detachments had been formed: at the General Post Office, Adelaide, the South Australian Gas Company and in Unley. Dr. Russell was appointed director, Mrs. P. E. Stow was appointed secretary; Emily Dutton was coordinator for the country areas. There was a substantial early response from potential volunteers and businesses willing to host detachments. The organisation had its headquarters at Stow Building, Flinders Street. Within a month dozens of detachments had been formed and some six hundred women had joined. Following Mrs Dutton's tour of the state, regional detachments were formed in Millicent, Mount Gambier and Burra. In her address to the women of Burra, Mrs Dutton cited the "wonderful preparedness of the women of Germany and Italy". It is unlikely that she was being ironic; up until the outbreak of World War II there was a considerable body of respect for the Fascist countries in the English-speaking world. In earlier newspaper reports of the formation of VSD's gas mask drill was frequently mentioned, but no hint as to the expected antagonist. Later reports turned to the less bellicose threats of flood and bushfire ahead of air raids. A weekly V.S.D. segment of the Country Women's Programme on radio 5AN and 5CK began in February 1939. By the end of that month, a hundred detachments had been raised, with 3000 volunteers, and the number continued to grow over the following six months.

=== Composition of Detachment ===
Each detachment to be composed of 12 or more women, aged either 18 to 43 or 40 and over. Office holders to be:

- Officer in Charge
- Second Officer in Charge
- Quartermaster
- Medical Officer
- Nursing Sister
- Pharmacist (as attached officer if male)
- Section leader (at least one and at most four; sections must be of at least 12 members)

Annual subscriptions to be 2s. per head, badge 6d. (in today's values around $4.00 and $1.00)

=== Comparison with VADs ===
Unlike the Voluntary Aid Detachments (VAD), members of the VSD were not required to undergo annual examinations once they had attended the prescribed series of lectures and practical classes, could not be required to leave their home town, and were not required to be competent truck and ambulance drivers. Another difference was that VADs would be subject to military control as from the commencement of war.

=== Decline and name changes ===
In 1942 following a drop in membership and in the number of detachments, the title of the organisation was changed to "Red Cross Detachments", ostensibly in an effort to avoid confusion between the two services. The focus of Red Cross volunteer services moved from civil defence to support for prisoners of war and following year some detachments changed their title to the less militaristic "Red Cross Group", arguing that this name was the standard elsewhere in Australia. By this time newspaper reports of the organisation's activities in the city had all but disappeared, and only a handful of country groups, notably Clare received any publicity. The old name persisted tenaciously however, and "Voluntary Service Detachments" were mentioned, even if misreported, in reference to alleviating staff shortages at Yorketown Hospital in 1943 and a calamitous bushfire near Mount Gambier in 1944.

== Western Australia ==
The Western Australian branch of the Australian Red Cross Society formed a similar organisation in mid-1939, but does not appear to have achieved a comparable level of membership as in South Australia. In 1941 their title was changed to Red Cross Emergency Service Companies (E.S.Cs), to better differentiate themselves from VADs. This was the same name adopted in 1939 by the Victorian branch of the Australian Red Cross Society for a very similar organisation.
