= Geoffrey Dutton =

Australian writer and historian

Geoffrey Dutton AO
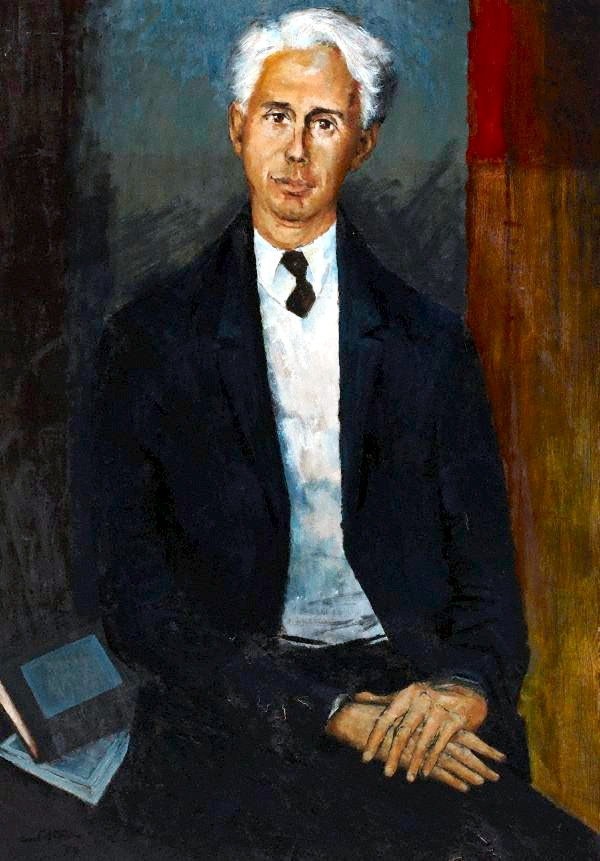
- 1959 portrait of Dutton by Clifton Pugh
- Born: Geoffrey Piers Henry Dutton; 2 August 1922; Anlaby Station, near Kapunda, South Australia
- Died: 17 September 1998 (aged 76)
- Education: University of Adelaide; Magdalen College, Oxford
- Occupations: Author, historian, poet, editor
- Writing career
- Years active: 1940s–1998
- Genres: Poetry, fiction, biography, history, children's literature
- Notable work: Antipodes in Shoes; Edward John Eyre: The Hero as Murderer; Kenneth Slessor: A Biography; Out in the Open
- Notable awards: Grace Leven Prize for Poetry (1958); FAW Christopher Brennan Award (1993)

Geoffrey 'Geppie' Piers Henry Dutton AO (2 August 1922 – 17 September 1998) was an Australian author and historian.

== Early life and education ==
Dutton was born at Anlaby Station near Kapunda, South Australia on 2 August 1922. His grandfather was Henry Dutton, the "Squire of Anlaby"; his parents were adventurer Henry Hampden Dutton and talented socialite Emily Dutton.

Dutton grew up in four houses owned by his parents: Anlaby Station near Kapunda; Kalymna (or Kalimna) House, on the edge of the east parklands, Adelaide; Ooraminna, on the foreshore at Victor Harbor; and Rocky Point, a limestone house overlooking Eastern Cove, Kangaroo Island. He was taught French as a young boy.

At age eight, he was sent to Wykeham Preparatory School near Belair, a suburb of Adelaide. After being tutored at home from around 1934 to 1939, he went to Geelong Grammar School, in Geelong, Victoria, matriculating in 1940.

Dutton enjoyed spotlighting in his teens, modifying a Morris van used at Anlaby to collect mail to be used to track rabbits and foxes.

He studied at the University of Adelaide from 1941 to 1945, residing at St Mark's College. He enrolled for English, History, and French, and continued piano lessons under Hooper Brewster-Jones. Before commencing, Dutton was introduced to Arthur Boyd, Gino Nibbi, and Max Nicholson. While at the University of Adelaide, he wrote for the student newspaper On Dit and avant-garde magazine Angry Penguins. His lecturers included G. V. Portus, J.I.M. Stewart, and Brian Elliott.

He later studied at Magdalen College, Oxford.

== Wartime service ==
Geoffrey enlisted into the Royal Australian Air Force at Keswick, South Australia, on 29 August 1940. He made the decision to join up on his eighteen birthday, sharing the news with his mother over lunch at the Covent Garden Cafe, Adelaide. He was taken on in May 1941, initially as a Second Class Aircraftman.

He was posted to No. 1 Elementary Flying Training School RAAF at Parafield Airport, in July 1941, before moving to No. 1 Service Flying Training School at Point Cook. He later received training at Central Flying School RAAF, Tamworth and No. 1 Wireless Air Gunnery School (1 WAGS) at Ballarat.

== Career ==
During his career, Dutton wrote or edited over 200 books, including poetry, fiction, biographies, art appreciation, art and literary history, travel books, novels for children and critical essays.

In 1965, together with Max Harris and Brian Stonier, he co-founded the Australian paperback publishing company Sun Books. Dutton was also a founder of the Adelaide Festival and Adelaide Writer's Week.

In June 1968, Dutton was appointed as an inaugural member of the Australian Council for the Arts.

== Later life and death ==
Dutton died on 17 September 1998.

== Awards and honours ==
- Grace Leven Prize for Poetry, 1958: winner for Antipodes in Shoes
- FAW Christopher Brennan Award, 1993: winner
- Appointed Officer of the Order of Australia, 1976,

== Bibliography ==
=== Novels ===
- The Mortal and the Marble (Chapman & Hall, 1950)
- Andy (Collins, 1968)
- Tamara (Collins, 1970)
- Queen Emma of the South Seas (Macmillan, 1976)
- The Eye Opener (University of Queensland Press, 1982)
- Flying Low: A Novel (1992)

=== Short stories ===
- The Españo

=== Poetry ===
- Night Flight and Sunrise (Reed & Harris, 1944)
- Antipodes in Shoes (Edwards & Shaw, 1958)
- Flowers and Fury: Poems (F. W. Cheshire, 1962)
- On My Island: Poems (F. W. Cheshire, 1967)
- Poems Soft and Loud (F. W. Cheshire, 1967)
- Findings and Keepings: Selected Poems, 1939-1969 (Australian Letters, 1970)
- North West: Fifteen Poems from the Pilbara and Kimberley (The author, 1971?)
- New Poems to 1972 (Australian Letters, 1972)
- A Body of Words (Edwards & Shaw, 1977)
- Selective Affinities: New Poems (Angus & Robertson, 1985)
- New and Selected Poems (Angus & Robertson, 1993)
- New York Nowhere (Lytlewode Press, 1998)

=== Children's ===
- Tisi and the Yabby (Collins, 1965)
- Seal Bay (Collins, 1966)
- Tisi and the Pageant (Rigby, 1968)
- The Prowler (Collins, 1982)

=== Non-fiction ===
- A Long Way South (Chapman & Hall, 1953)
- Founder of a City: The Life of Colonel William Light, First Surveyor-General of the Colony of South Australia: Founder of Adelaide 1786-1839 (F. W. Cheshire, 1960)
- Patrick White (Lansdowne Press, 1961) (Australian Writers and Their Work
- Whitman (1961)
- Australia and the Monarchy (Sun Books, 1966)
- Edward John Eyre: The Hero as Murderer, Collins/F. W. Cheshire, Sydney (1967); reprint, Penguin Books, Melbourne (1977)
- Russell Drysdale (Thames & Hudson, 1969) (The World of Art Series)
- In Search of Edward John Eyre (Macmillan, 1982)
- Snow on the Saltbush: The Australian Literary Experience (Viking, 1984)
- The Squatters (Currey O'Neil, 1985) The author's life at Anlaby Station
- Sun, Sea, Surf and Sand: The Myth of the Beach (Oxford University Press, 1985)
- The Innovators: The Sydney Alternatives in the Rise of Modern Art, Literature and Ideas (Macmillan, 1986)
- Kenneth Slessor: A Biography (Viking, 1991)
- Out in the Open: An Autobiography (University of Queensland Press, 1994)
- A Rare Bird: Penguin Books in Australia 1946-96 (Penguin Books, 1996)

=== Edited ===
- Australia's Censorship Crisis (Sun Books, 1970) - with Max Harris
- Australian Verse from 1805 : A Continuum (Rigby, 1976)
- Republican Australia? (Sun Books, 1977) ISBN 0-7251-0261-6
- Seven Cities of Australia (J. Ferguson, 1978)
- Sir Henry, Bjelke, Don Baby and Friends (Sun Books, 1971) - with Max Harris
- The Vital Decade: Ten Years of Australian Art and Letters (Sun Books, 1968) - with Max Harris
- The Australian Bedside Book: A Selection of Writings from The Australian Literary Supplement (Macmillan, 1987) - preface by Morris West; contributors include Elizabeth Jolley, Dianne Highbridge, Les A. Murray, Tim Winton, Kate Grenville.

== Family ==
Geoffrey's father, Henry Hampden Dutton married Emily Martin, on 29 November 1905; their children were:

- John Hansborough Dutton (23 August 1906 – 1989)
- Richard Hampden Dutton (6 August 1909 – 13 December 1940) married Margaret Elizabeth Newland ( – ) on 25 February 1933. They had one child:
  - Leonie Dutton. Married to Roderick Matheson AM QC.
- Bryony Helen Carola Dutton (22 October 1918 – 2005) was engaged to William Weatherly (Flying Officer with 459 Squadron and later awarded DFC) in 1940 but married American soldier William Robert Curkeet on 24 August 1942. She returned to South Australia in 1945; they divorced and she married distinguished lawyer Professor, later Sir, Richard Arthur "Dick" Blackburn OBE (26 July 1918 – 1 October 1987) on 1 December 1951. They had two children:
  - Charlotte Blackburn ( – ), later Calder
  - Tom Blackburn SC ( – )
- Geoffrey Piers Henry Dutton (2 August 1922 – 17 September 1998), a noted writer. He had three children with his first wife, Ninette Trott:
  - Francis Dutton
  - Sam Dutton
  - Tisi Dutton
