= Henry Hampden Dutton =

Australian farmer (1879–1932)

Henry Hampden Dutton (13 February 1879 – 15 June 1932), often referred to as Harry Dutton, was a South Australian pastoralist, remembered for in 1908 making the first automobile journey from Adelaide to Port Darwin.

He was born in North Adelaide, the son of Henry Dutton, the "Squire of Anlaby" (1844 – 26 August 1914), and studied at St. Peter's College, Lancing College, Essex, and Magdalen College, Oxford, where he rowed against Cambridge and graduated MA.

He was a keen motorist and in November 1907 attempted the trip to Darwin with noted cyclist-mechanic Murray Aunger (1878–1953) in a 20–24 h.p. Talbot, but was forced to abandon the car when it broke down near Tennant Creek. Dutton and Aunger again left Adelaide on 30 June 1908 in a similar vehicle and were joined en route by Ernest Allchurch (c.1870–1932) the Telegraph Officer from Alice Springs. The three completed the journey on 20 August, having recovered the first Talbot on the way. The car and its steel-studied Michelin tyres were reported as having performed flawlessly.

Harry was a keen yachtsman. In late 1912 he was delivered of his latest acquisition, the 36.5 ft auxiliary yacht called Wyruna. Wyruna was often docked at Victor Harbor or Kangaroo Island, often ferrying family members between houses owned at both locations.

He inherited the pastoral property "Anlaby", near Kapunda in 1914 from his father. When World War One broke out, Harry and Emily were in London. Harry attempted to enlist, but was rejected owing to a knee injury caused by a riding accident. Upon return to Australia, he attempted to enlist again, but was again rejected.

In 1921 he and his wife motored from Oodnadatta to Katherine; she was the first woman to make that trip. Harry accompanied acclaimed geologist, Sir Edgeworth David, on an exploratory mission to Finke River to explore evidence of an ice age in Australia. Harry and Emily accompanied Vilhjalmur Stefansson, Canadian-born Arctic explorer, on an exploratory trip to Central Australia in 1924.

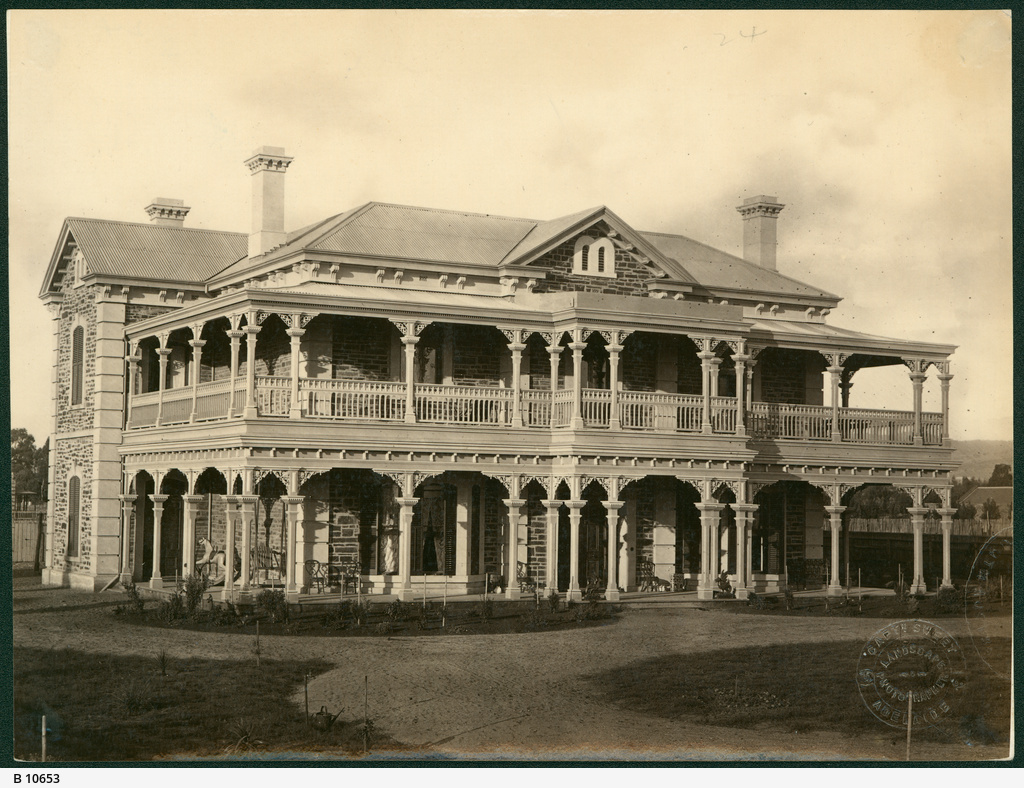
Kalymna House, Dequetteville Terrace, Kent Town, Adelaide. c. 1875.

His son, Geoffrey, described him in his autobiography as, "short, witty and jolly, with brown eyes in a genial round face, smoking cigarettes and cigars incessantly. He always wore a suit, with a waistcoat and white collar and tie. He loved the vulgarity of music-hall jokes and songs, and French ashtrays in the shape of a little wooden lavatory...."

He and T. L. Browne purchased Corona Station in 1910, and sold it to Sidney Kidman in 1917. He sold his share in the station in 1926.

Harry and Emily bought Kalymna House in the early 1920s to provide an Adelaide home for their sons, John and Richard, while they studied at St. Peter's College.

== Motoring pursuits ==
Harry was a keen motorist and in November 1907 attempted the trip to Darwin with noted cyclist-mechanic Murray Aunger (1878–1953) in a 20–24 h.p. Clemont Talbot, which had the SA Registration number 319 and was called 'Angelina'. The four-cylinder engine had dual ignition, four speeds and reverse, and could attain speeds of up to 50mph (80kmh). The car was overhauled, with a special body constructed to carry provisions, capacity to carry up to 100 gallons of petrol, and steel-studded tires.

Aunger and Dutton did not aim to complete the 2,066-mile (3325km) journey quickly, rather to test the capabilities of the car and ascertain if a motor journey between Adelaide and Darwin was possible.

Auger and Dutton left Adelaide on Monday, 25 November, 1907, at noon. The Advertiser wrote of the pair, "The hazardous undertaking shows that the two gentlemen have confidence in motor traction to surmount the difficulties of a journey, a large portion of which must necessarily be through roadless country. [T]he pluck and enterprise of the two gentleman will meet with a good deal of admiration, whatever the result of the experiment may be...the progress of the enterprising motorists will be watched with keen interest."

The Laura Standard reported Dutton and Aunger passed through Herbert Street, Laura, on Monday afternoon, at a "rapid rate." The journey north, they negotiated tough terrain and remained close to the Overland Telegraph Line.

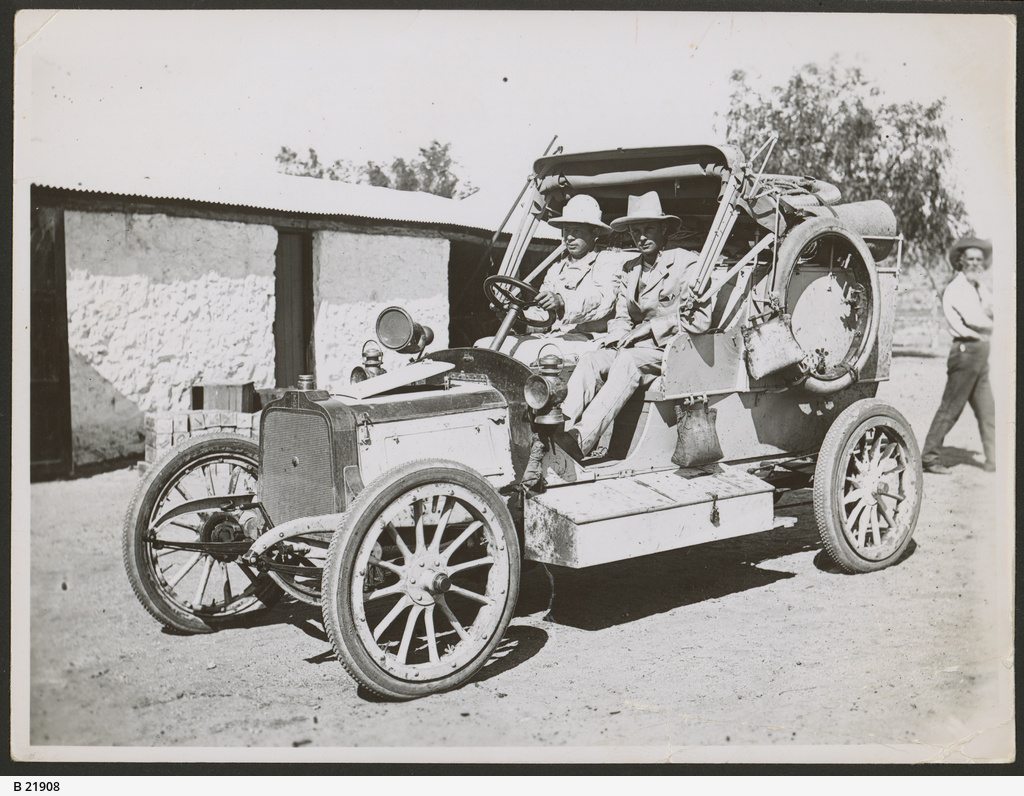
Henry 'Harry' Dutton and Murray Aunger, at Alice Springs on their first attempt to traverse Australia by motor in 1907.

On 28 November they passed through Leigh Creek, and the following day, 29 November, Murray and Harry had reached Hergott Springs (Maree) and reached Coward Springs four days later on 3 December. At Coward Springs, they found the petrol tins sent ahead had burst and evaporated. With limited supplies, the Talbot was loaded onto a train to Oodnadatta to continue the journey from there.

They arrived at Charlotte Waters, an Overland Telegraph Line station, on the afternoon of December 9. This was their first time in the Northern Territory.

On 27 December, Dutton and Aunger telegraphed that "it is impossible to proceed further than Tennant Creek owing to heavy rains ahead." The car was left at Tennant Creek, as the pair returned to Oodnadatta by pack horses, the plan being to reach Port Darwin after the wet season.

Dutton and Aunger again left Adelaide on 30 June 1908 in a similar vehicle and were joined en route by Ernest Allchurch (c.1870–1932) the Telegraph Officer from Alice Springs. The three completed the journey on 20 August, having recovered the first Talbot on the way. The car and its steel-studied Michelin tyres were reported as having performed flawlessly.

The Talbot named 'Overlander' was acquired by the National Motor Museum, Birdwood, South Australia, in 1977. It is kept in running condition. In 2008, the vehicle was taken on a 51-day tour retracing Harry and Murray's journey, and visiting 23 venues and 21 schools along the way.

== Family ==
Henry Hampden Dutton married Emily Martin, niece of James Martin MHA, MLC, on 29 November 1905; their children were;

- John Hansborough Dutton (23 August 1906 – )
- Richard Hampden Dutton (6 August 1909 – 13 December 1940) married Margaret Elizabeth Newland ( – ) on 25 February 1933
- Bryony Helen Carola Dutton (22 October 1918 – 2005) was engaged to William Weatherly (Flying Officer with 459 Squadron and later awarded DFC) in 1940 but married American soldier William Robert Curkeet on 24 August 1942. She returned to South Australia in 1945; they divorced and she married distinguished lawyer Professor, later Sir, Richard Arthur "Dick" Blackburn OBE (26 July 1918 – 1 October 1987) on 1 December 1951. They had two children:

- Charlotte Blackburn ( – ), later Calder
- Tom Blackburn SC ( – )

- Geoffrey Piers Henry Dutton (2 August 1922 – 17 September 1998), a noted writer
