= Victor Marra Newland =

Australian politician

Member of the South Australian House of Assembly for North Adelaide
- In office 8 April 1933 – 19 March 1938 Serving with Shirley Jeffries
- Preceded by: Frederick Birrell
- Succeeded by: Division abolished

Personal details
- Born: 18 August 1876 near Wilcannia, New South Wales
- Died: 12 January 1953 (aged 76) Adelaide, South Australia
- Party: Liberal and Country League
- Relations: Henry Newland (brother); Phil Newland (brother)
- Parent: Simpson Newland (father)

Military service
- Allegiance: Australia; United Kingdom
- Branch/service: Australian Army; British Army
- Years of service: c.1899–1901 1914–1918
- Rank: Major
- Unit: Second South Australian Mounted Rifles; King's African Rifles
- Battles/wars: Second Boer War; First World War
- Awards: Officer of the Order of the British Empire; Military Cross; Distinguished Conduct Medal; Mentioned in Despatches (3)

Victor Marra Newland, OBE, MC, DCM (18 August 1876 – 12 January 1953) was an Australian army officer and politician. He served in the Second Boer War and with the King's African Rifles in the First World War, was decorated for his service in each, and retired with the rank of major. He was formerly a member of the Legislative Council of British East Africa, and in 1933 became the representative for North Adelaide in the South Australian House of Assembly.

== Early life and career ==
Newland was born at Marra station, near Wilcannia, New South Wales, the third son of Simpson Newland (1835–1925) and his wife Jane Isabella Newland, née Layton (c. 1850 – 11 January 1939). He was educated at Queen's School, North Adelaide, and St. Peter's College, and was a member of the Modern Pickwick Club. He joined the South Australian Mounted Rifles and sailed to South Africa with the second contingent of the Light Horse and served in the Boer War. He was mentioned in despatches, and awarded the Distinguished Conduct Medal and the Queen's South Africa Medal with five clasps.

After the war he remained in Africa. He acted as manager for a land and stock agency in Nairobi, British East Africa (now Kenya) in 1903, then two years later with fellow South Australian Leslie Jefferis Tarlton (1877–c. 1950) he formed Newland, Tarlton & Co. Ltd., organizing big-game safaris for wealthy patrons, including Theodore Roosevelt in 1909–1910. Newland was a president of the Associated Chambers of Commerce, a member of the Kenya's Legislative Council, and chairman of the Nairobi Town Council.

== First World War and politics ==
He was holidaying in Australia at the outbreak of the First World War, and returned to Kenya. He joined the King's African Rifles and fought in the German East Africa campaign, attaining the rank of major and winning the Military Cross. He was also appointed an Officer of the Order of the British Empire and mentioned in despatches twice.

Newland returned to Adelaide where in 1923 he was made a member of the Stock Exchange, and three years later became a partner in the firm of Newland and Hunter. Almost up to the time of his death, his interests and his influence remained widespread. Their home for many years was at 34 Molesworth Street, North Adelaide.

In 1933 he was elected to the South Australian House of Assembly as the Liberal and Country League (LCL) member for North Adelaide, serving until 1938.

He was buried at Victor Harbour.

== Other interests ==
- Newland was famous as a big game hunter
- He was a member of the Council of the Zoological Society for more than 20 years.
- He was president of the Royal Society of St. George.
- He was closely associated with the British Imperial Servicemen's sub-branch of the RSL.

== Family ==
Rev. Ridgway William Newland (c. 1788 – 8 March 1864) was married to Martha Newland, née Keeling (c. 1797 – 13 April 1870), arrived in South Australia with six children aboard Sir Charles Forbes in June 1839.

- Simpson Newland (2 November 1835 – 27 June 1925) married Jane Isabella Layton (c. 1850 – 11 January 1939) on 12 September 1872. Had issue:

- Col. Henry Simpson Newland CBE, DSO (1873–1969)
- Philip Mesmer "Phil" Newland (2 February 1875 – 11 August 1916), noted cricketer
- Victor Marra Newland OBE MC DCM (1876 – 12 January 1953) married Elsie Margaret Porter (1879 – 11 February 1950) on 20 April 1909. Their family included:

- Margaret Elizabeth Jean Newland (10 January 1910 – 1988) married Richard Hampden Dutton (6 August 1909 – 13 December 1940), son of Henry Hampden Dutton on 25 February 1933. They divorced in July 1940. She married again, to Sidney Downer (September 1909 – September 1969) on 8 September 1948. They separated around 1960.
- Elaine Newland ( –1995) married Robert Henry Wreford (1909–1990) on 8 July 1936. He was managing director, G. & R. Wills from 1961; lived in North Adelaide.

- Dr. Clive Newland (1878 – 25 January 1919) killed when he rode his motorcycle into a railway train.
- Ralph Dimmock Newland (1880 – 20 September 1933) married Hazel Thornton Creswell (c. 1887 – 4 November 1915) on 7 June 1909. He married Mildred Faith Dinning in 1930.

== Sources ==
- Serle, Percival (1949). "Newland, Simpson". Dictionary of Australian Biography. Sydney: Angus & Robertson.
- Royal, Simon (13 May 2018). "How a lad from the outback took US president Theodore Roosevelt on an African safari". Australian Broadcasting Corporation.
