= Hundred of Julia Creek =

Julia Creek
- Cadastral division
- Coordinates: 34.180°S 139.028°E
- Country: Australia
- State: South Australia
- LGA(s): Goyder
- Established: 7 August 1851

Area
  - Total: 230 km^{2} (89 sq mi)
- County: Light

The Hundred of Julia Creek is a cadastral unit of hundred located in the Mid North of South Australia. It was named by Governor Henry Young in 1851 after a local tributary of the Light River, the watercourse having been earlier named for Julia Gawler, daughter of the former governor George Gawler.

Within the hundred are the localities of Ngapala (southern part including township), Julia, Hampden, Eudunda (minor part excluding township), Buchanan and Hansborough (eastern part including township but excluding railway station).

== Local government ==
The hundred was first governed by the District Council of Julia from 1874 to 1932. As part of the statewide local government consolidations of the early 1930s, the council was amalgamated with the easterly neighbouring District Council of Neales to form the District Council of Eudunda, with the Hundred of Julia Creek area becoming the Julia ward. In 1997 the seat of local government shifted to Burra when the Regional Council of Goyder was formed in 1997 from four district councils in the area, but a branch office remained in the town of Eudunda to serve Julia Creek residents.

== See also ==
- Lands administrative divisions of South Australia
