= Hamilton, South Australia =

Hamilton South Australia
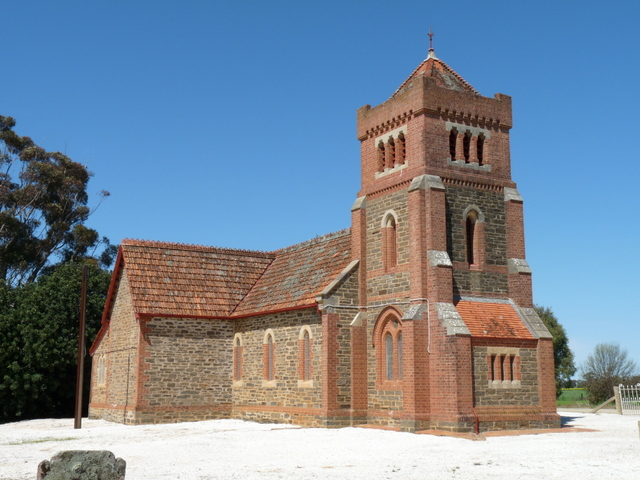
- St. Matthew's Anglican Church, Hamilton

- Coordinates: 34°13′S 138°52′E
- Population: 82 (SAL 2016)
- Established: 16 March 2000 (locality)
- Postcode(s): 5373
- Time zone: ACST (UTC+9:30)
  - Summer (DST): ACDT (UTC+10:30)
- Location: 120 km (75 mi) NE of Adelaide; 23 km (14 mi) N of Kapunda
- LGA(s): Light Regional Council
- State electorate(s): Stuart
- Federal division(s): Barker
Localities around Hamilton:
Riverton	Marrabel; Tarnma	Hampden
Riverton; Tarlee	Hamilton	Buchanan
Tarlee; Bethel	Allendale North; Kapunda	Hansborough; Bagot Well

Hamilton (postcode 5373) is a small township in the Mount Lofty Ranges in South Australia. It is about 120 km northeast of Adelaide, South Australia, about 23 km north of Kapunda. Once a stop for the mining carts going from Adelaide to Burra, but now just a small agricultural district.

Hamilton was founded by George Weighton Robertson. George Weighton Robertson was born in Hamilton, Lanarkshire, Scotland in about 1818. As a young single man, George sailed to Australia in 1836 aboard the “Tam o’Shanter”, one of the First Fleet of South Australia; 9 ships bringing the first European settlers to South Australia, arriving in December that year. In 1841 he was living at Thebarton with his first wife Margaret Finn (believed born in Dublin, Ireland in about 1820). They had six children, 2 daughters and 4 sons.

In 1848 George obtained the licence to the Red Lion Hotel in Rundle Street, Adelaide, before obtaining a grant of land north of Kapunda. He drew up a plan for a town he called Hamilton, named the streets for his children, built a hotel in 1850 (destroyed by fire in about 1875) and donated land for a church.

In 1863, George’s eldest son David married Margaret Stribling, whose family owned the Wheatsheaf Inn at Allendale North near Kapunda, and later became the licensee. George died on 10 June 1871 near the Wheatsheaf. In an extraordinary twist of fate, when returning to Hamilton, the cart in which he was a passenger collided with another cart being driven from Hamilton by his son David. George and his first wife Margaret Finn (died 1860) are both buried at St Matthew’s Church, Hamilton. George remarried twice after Margaret’s death, to Margaret Kelton in 1860, then to Sarah Lyshon in 1870.

Hamilton was the birthplace of Albert Percy Blesing in 1879, MP for Northern from 1924 to 1944. He served as Minister for Agriculture, Local Government and Afforestation in the government of Thomas Playford IV. This now shrinking town used to be a very vibrant one with its own football, netball and cricket teams all of which now are non-existent. The Hamilton tennis club is still running and plays in the Julia & Light Tennis Association. The park at Hamilton is called Gill Park and is named after the Gill family which was prominent in the district.

The Hamilton school opened in 1860 by the local residents. The school contributed to the development of the township, as it provided local access to primary education. The nearest town, Kapunda, was too far to travel daily to school with 19th century transport. The Hamilton school closed in 1948 and the remaining students and teacher transferred to Kapunda Primary.

The Dutton Memorial Church of St Matthew was built in 1896 (replacing a more modest building of 1857) and financed by one man, Henry Dutton (1844–1914) of nearby Anlaby Station as a memorial to his brother Frederick, and to Henry's wife Helen and their daughter Ethel, who died accidentally on Granite Island. Henry Dutton was occasional lay reader and, an accomplished musician, played the organ, a magnificent instrument for such a small town. The church is listed on the South Australian Heritage Register.

The historic Anlaby Station complex is located within the modern boundaries of Hamilton. Anlaby Homestead and the Anlaby Shearing Shed, Slaughterhouse, Shearers' Quarters and Manager's House are both separately listed on the South Australian Heritage Register.
