= Julia Creek =

Julia Creek may refer to:

- Julia Creek (Light River tributary), see Light River (South Australia)
- Julia Creek, Queensland, Australia, an outback town in the Shire of Mckinlay
- Hundred of Julia Creek, South Australia

== See also ==
- Julia, South Australia
