= Tarnma, South Australia =

Locality in the mid north of South Australia

Tarnma Friedrichswalde
- Town
- Interactive map of Tarnma
- Coordinates: 34.146°S 138.954°E
- Country: Australia
- State: South Australia
- LGA: Clare and Gilbert Valleys Council
- Location: 15 km (9.3 mi) west of Eudunda; 100 km (62 mi) NNE of Adelaide

Government
  - State electorate: Frome
  - Federal division: Grey

Population
  - Total: 20 (SAL 2021)
- Postcode: 5413
Localities around Tarnma
	Tothill Creek	Ngapala, Julia
Marrabel	Tarnma	Hampden
	Hamilton	Buchanan

Tarnma is a locality in the Mid North region of South Australia, between Marrabel and Eudunda, South Australia, crossed by the Curio Road, part of route B84. The area of Tarnma was known as Friedrichswalde (German: [ˈfʁiːdʁɪçsˌvaldɪ]) until "names of enemy origin" were changed in 1918. The current boundaries were formalised in January 2001.

Tarnma has a cemetery and previously had two Lutheran churches, all on Frederick Road. The Immanuel Evangelical Lutheran Church was dedicated in 1872. The congregation split and the Redeemer congregation met in houses until its own building was dedicated in 1911. The Immanuel congregation was dissolved in 1957 and the Redeemer congregation dissolved in 1965. There was also a school until the 1940s.

== Residents ==
Hermann Büring, of the winemaking firm of Bûring & Sobels, was associated with Friedrichswalde. His son Leo Buring and daughter Meta Buring were born there.
