= Tothill Creek, South Australia =

Tothill Creek South Australia
- Coordinates: 34.088°S 138.916°E
- Population: 9 (SAL 2021)
- Postcode(s): 5413
- Location: 32 km (20 mi) north of Kapunda; 16 km (10 mi) east of Saddleworth
- LGA(s): Clare and Gilbert Valleys Council
- State electorate(s): Frome
- Federal division(s): Grey
Localities around Tothill Creek:
Steelton	Tothill Belt
	Tothill Creek	Ngapala
Marrabel	Tarnma	Julia

Tothill Creek is a locality in the Mid North of South Australia. it is in the District Council of Clare and Gilbert Valleys, 16 kilometres east of Saddleworth. It was named for Charles Tothill, who held land under an occupation licence from 1843. The area was part of Anlaby Station.

The Tothill Creek Primary school opened in 1883. Both it and the post office are now closed. Tothill Creek area had two churches. The Church of England was on a rise on the western side, overlooking the valley, with a cemetery behind it. The Kollyowha Primitive Methodist Church and school was two kilometres north of the Tothill Creek School, but all that remains visible is a couple of headstones. It also had a blacksmith, butcher and Royal Oak Hotel.

A report in the Adelaide Observer in 1866 describes the population as a mixture of German and Irish farmers.
