= District Council of Julia =

Coordinates: 34°09′00″S 139°03′00″E

Seat of the former District Council of Julia in South Australia

The District Council of Julia was a local government area in South Australia from 1874 to 1932. The council seat was located at Hampden.

The council was proclaimed on 3 September 1874, comprising the cadastral Hundred of Julia Creek. There had been proposals that year to include Julia Creek in a new council for the Hundred of Neales, but these met with opposition in Julia Creek, and the separate District Council of Neales would not be created until 1878. The first council chamber was a rented house. It lacked permanent offices for many years, and in 1919 it was reported that they had been required to move offices four times in ten years. A permanent office was subsequently built at Hampden in 1920.

In 1923, it had a total area of 86 square miles, with a total population of 573, mostly on the land. It had 11 miles of main roads and 150 miles of district roads under its jurisdiction. The main railway siding was at Hampden, while there were schools at Hansborough, Julia and Ngapala.

It ceased to exist on 12 May 1932 when, as part of broad local government amalgamations in South Australia, it merged with the District Council of Neales to form the District Council of Eudunda, becoming the Julia Ward of the new council.

== Chairmen ==
- Henry Thomas Morris (1874–1875, 1883 1886, 1889–1890)
- T. Prior (1922–1923, 1928)
- D. S. Heaslip (1925)
- T. Prior (1928)
