= Bagot Well, South Australia =

Bagot Well South Australia
- Coordinates: 34°18′14″S 138°58′56″E
- Population: 84 (2016 census)
- Established: 16 March 2000 (locality)
- Postcode(s): 5373
- Elevation: 292 m (958 ft)
- Location: 6 km (4 mi) NE of Kapunda
- LGA(s): Light Regional Council
- County: Light
- State electorate(s): Stuart
- Federal division(s): Barker
Localities around Bagot Well:
Hamilton	Hamilton; Buchanan; Hansborough	Hansborough
Allendale North; Kapunda	Bagot Well	Hansborough; St Kitts
Kapunda	Kapunda; Koonunga	St Kitts
- Footnotes: adjoining localities

Bagot Well (previously Bagot's Well) is a locality around six km (3.7 mi) north-east of Kapunda, South Australia on the road to Eudunda. It was named for Captain C. H. Bagot, who owned a great deal of property in the area.

Bagot Well as a place began as a well sunk by Captain Bagot which became available for public use in 1855. On 5 December 1940, it was renamed from Bagot's Well to Bagot Well. On 16 March 2000, boundaries for the locality were created for the "long established name."

Bagot Well was served by the Morgan railway line from when it was extended from Kapunda in 1878. The line was closed in 1994, but passenger services had ceased much earlier and freight trains carrying bulk grain from Eudunda to Port Adelaide did not stop there.

The Postcode for Bagot Well is 5373.

The 2016 Australian census which was conducted in August 2016 reports that Bagot Well had a population of 84 people.
