= Allendale North =

- Suburb
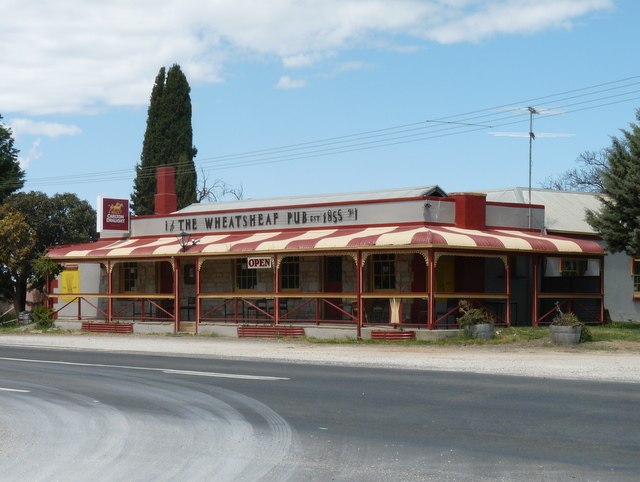
- Wheatsheaf Pub at Allendale North

- Coordinates: 34°18′S 138°55′E
- Country: Australia
- State: South Australia
- LGA: Light Regional Council
- Location: 4 km (2.5 mi) N of Kapunda
- Established: 1849 (town); 16 March 2000 (locality)

Government
  - State electorate: Stuart
  - Federal division: Barker
- Postcode: 5373
Suburbs around Allendale North
	Hamilton	Buchanan
Tarlee	Allendale North	Bagot Well
	Kapunda

Allendale North (also known as Allendale) is a locality in the Australian state of South Australia about 4 km (2.5 mi) north of the town of Kapunda.

== History ==
Allendale North was surveyed in 1859. The post office was opened in 1861. The wheatsheaf pub was built in 1855. The fertile land made perfect for farming. A steam flour mill was built in the 1855. A school was erected in 1881. Allen's creek runs through the village. In 1856 William Oldham bought two sections of land and lived in Allendale. He ran the Allendale mill until the 1860s, and was mine manager in Kapunda. A Bible Christian Church, which later was used by the United Evangelical Lutherans, was built in the village in the 1854. On 16 March 2000, boundaries for the locality were created for the "long established name."
