= St Kitts, South Australia =

St Kitts South Australia
- Coordinates: 34.3°S 139.1°E
- Population: 43 (SAL 2021)
- Established: 16 March 2000 (locality)
- Postcode(s): 5356
- Location: 7 km (4 mi) northwest of Truro
- LGA(s): Light Regional Council
- State electorate(s): Stuart
- Federal division(s): Barker
Localities around St Kitts:
Bagot Well	Hansborough
Koonunga	St Kitts	Dutton
Ebenezer		Truro

St Kitts is a locality northeast of the Barossa Valley in South Australia. The school and both Lutheran churches have closed. The main industry in the area is cereal grain crop farming.

St Kitts was settled in the 1850s and 1860s by immigrant Sorbs or Wends who had migrated from Saxony (then part of Prussia, now mostly in western Poland).

St Kitts St Petri (St Peter) congregation was established in 1866 and constructed its building in 1869, replaced by a newer building in 1910 on the corner of St Kitts West and Tablelands Roads. St Kitts St Paul's congregation began in 1903 and built its own church building a little further along Tablelands Road. Both churches had cemeteries. St Paul's closed in 1949. St Petri is also now closed and both buildings are private homes.
