= Erhard F. Boehm =

Erhard F. Boehm (1911–1994) was an Australian farmer and amateur ornithologist of German ancestry. He was born in Eudunda, South Australia, and lived most of his life in the same area. In the 1950s he was the South Australian representative on the RAOU Standing Committee on Conservation. From the 1940s until his death he wrote over 150 articles on birds for the Emu, the South Australian Ornithologist, the Australian Bird Bander, Corella and other publications, including reviews on material in German.
