= Hampden, South Australia =

Hampden South Australia
- Coordinates: 34.15°S 139.05°E
- Population: 75 (SAL 2021)
- Postcode(s): 5374
- Location: 6 km (4 mi) northwest of Eudunda; 9 km (6 mi) south of Point Pass
- LGA(s): Regional Council of Goyder
- State electorate(s): Stuart
- Federal division(s): Grey
Localities around Hampden:
Tarnma	Julia	Eudunda
Tarnma	Hampden	Eudunda
Tarnma	Buchanan	Eudunda
- Footnotes: Coordinates

Hampden is a rural locality in the Mid North region of South Australia, situated in the Regional Council of Goyder. It was established in August 2000, when boundaries were formalised for the "long established local name". It was named for William Hampden Dutton, brother of Frederick Dutton, who established Anlaby Station.

The area was first settled by Europeans as part of the much larger Anlaby Station, and was first subdivided into smaller farms in 1906. A siding on the Morgan railway line (which had run through the area since 1878) was built in 1909. A store opened in 1911. Hampden Post Office opened as Hampden Siding on 8 July 1912, was renamed on 16 July 1934, and closed on 1 August 1983. A manual telephone exchange opened around August 1915 and closed in December 1982. A woodyard and blacksmith's shop opened in 1919. The woodyard and blacksmith's shop have long closed, while the store closed more recently. Railway passenger services ended in December 1968 and the last freight train ran through Hampden in March 1994.

A council chambers for the District Council of Julia opened in the main street of Hampden in 1920, replacing a converted house two miles south of town; it would remain the council seat until their abolition in 1932. The Hampden School was opened in the council chambers on 1 September 1925, and the building was enlarged in 1932 to make it more suitable for school purposes and public functions. The school continued to operate from the building until its closure on 6 September 1951. In 1954, the building was handed over to the community for use as a District Hall. The Methodist church also held services in the hall until 1970. The Buchanan Agricultural Bureau also met in the hall after the sale of the Buchanan Hall.

The Hampden Tennis Club opened in 1958 following the completion of tennis courts beside the hall. In the 2000s, the tennis club leased both the hall and tennis courts from the Regional Council of Goyder.
