= Saddleworth, South Australia =

Saddleworth
- Town
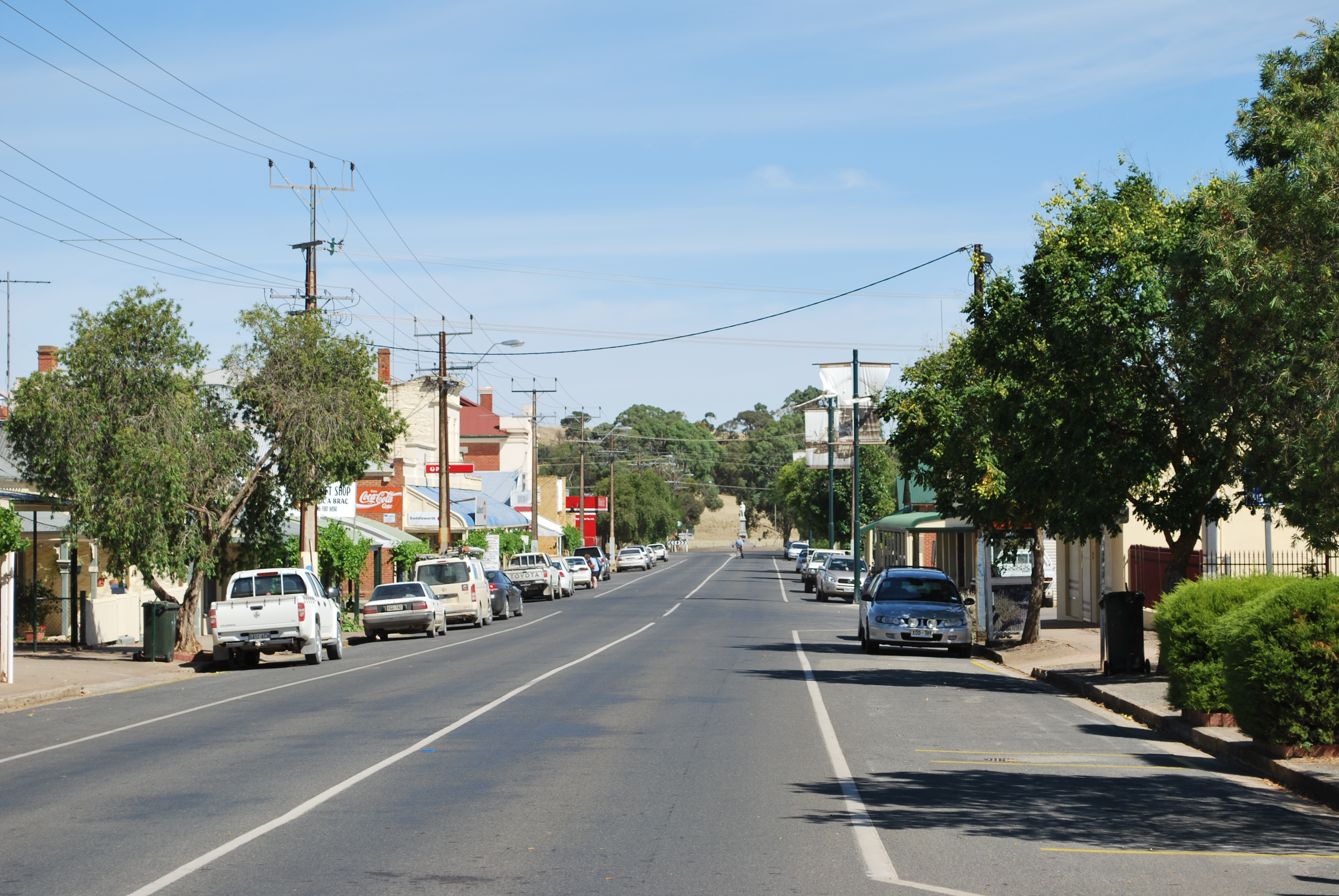
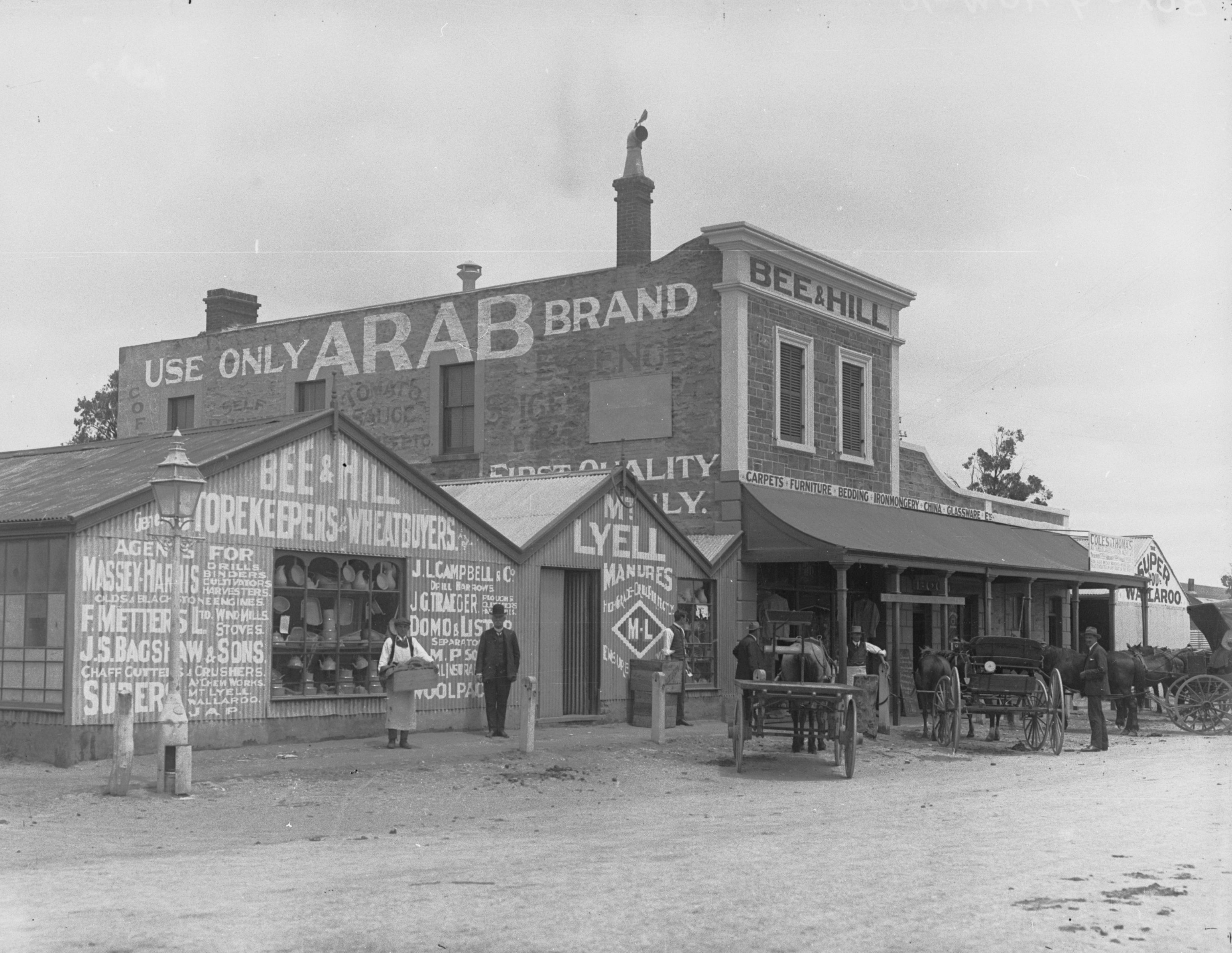
- Belvidere Road, the main street of Saddleworth Bee & Hill store, 1894-1919

- Coordinates: 34°05′0″S 138°47′0″E
- Country: Australia
- State: South Australia
- LGA: District Council of Clare and Gilbert Valleys
- Location: 103 km (64 mi) north of Adelaide; 53 km (33 mi) south of Burra; 12 km (7.5 mi) south-east of Auburn

Government
  - State electorate: Frome
  - Federal division: Grey

Population
  - Total: 397 (UCL 2021)
- Postcode: 5413

Saddleworth is a small town in the Mid North region of South Australia. The town is situated on the Gilbert River and along with neighbouring towns of Riverton, Rhynie and Tarlee the local area is known as the Gilbert Valley. The town is bisected by the Barrier Highway. At the 2016 census, Saddleworth had a population of 470.

Saddleworth was originally established as one of many settlements on the road to Burra, and was named after Saddleworth Lodge pastoral station, a local landholding which itself was named after a civil parish on the edges of the Pennines in Yorkshire, England, part of which is in the Metropolitan Borough of Oldham near Greater Manchester, England. Joseph Dunn applied for a Publican's Licence to open a new Saddleworth Lodge in March 1846, and it was granted on 14 March 1846. The Burra railway line passed through the town from 1870 until the early 2000s.

An old store on the Barrier Highway has been converted into a museum which focuses on the history of Saddleworth and the nearby towns of Waterloo, Marrabel, and Manoora.

Saddleworth is in the District Council of Clare and Gilbert Valleys local government area, the state electoral district of Frome and the federal Division of Grey.

The town has a 3 km long Heritage Walking Trail which provides an insight into the history of the area.

In May 2016 the local store burned down. The store was also home to the town's Post Office.

== Gallery ==
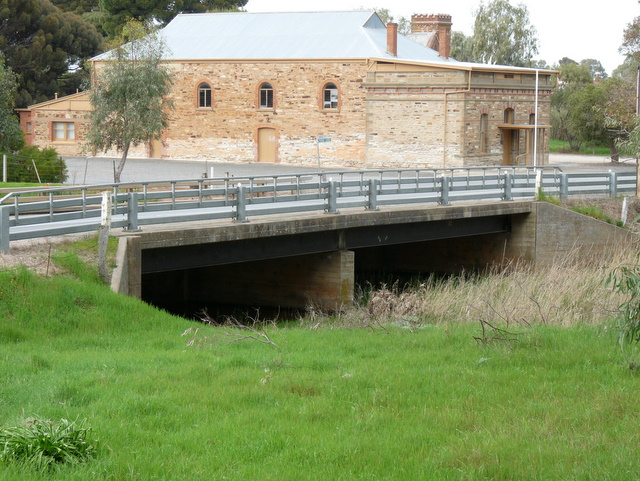
Gilbert River Bridge

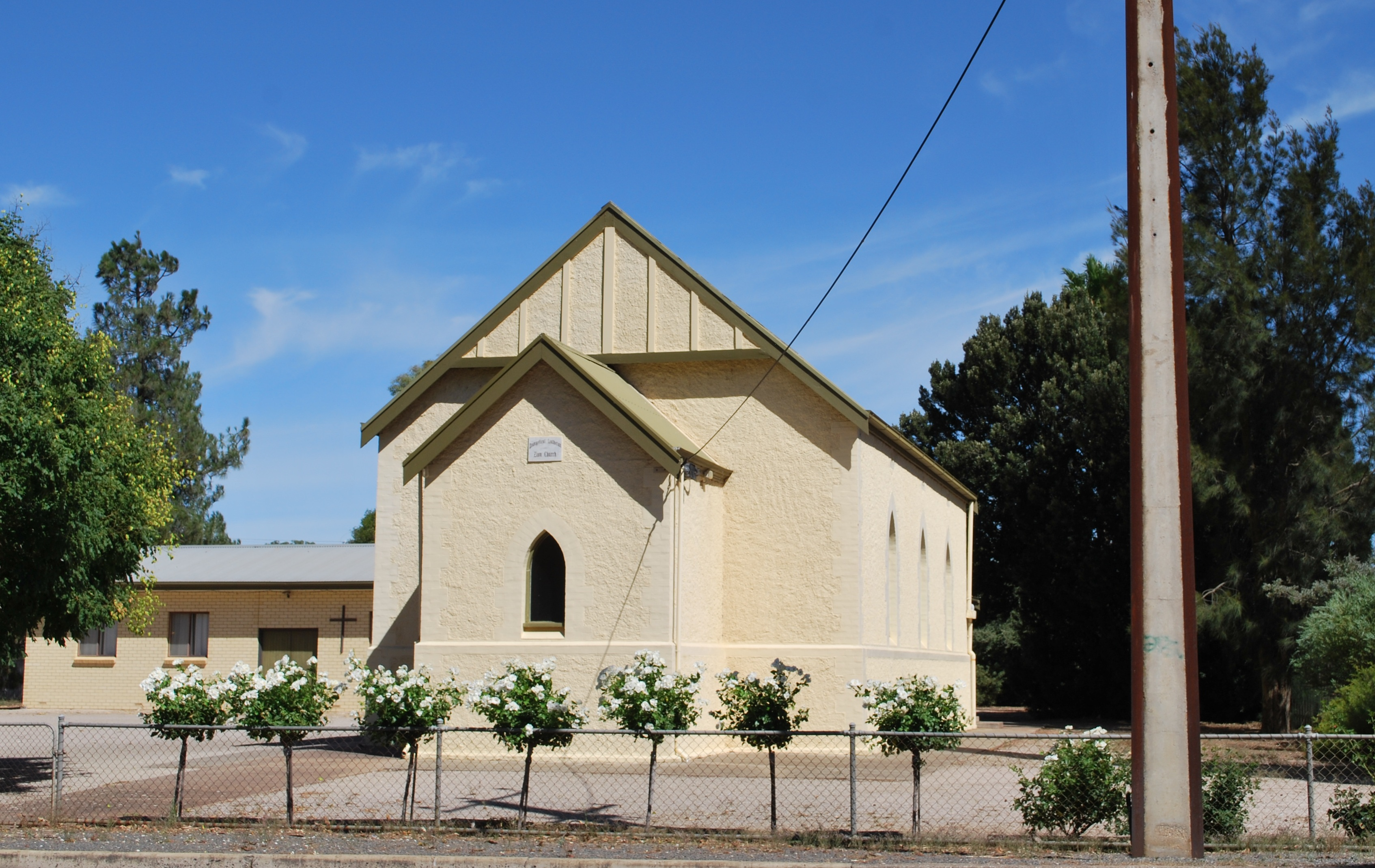
Lutheran Church

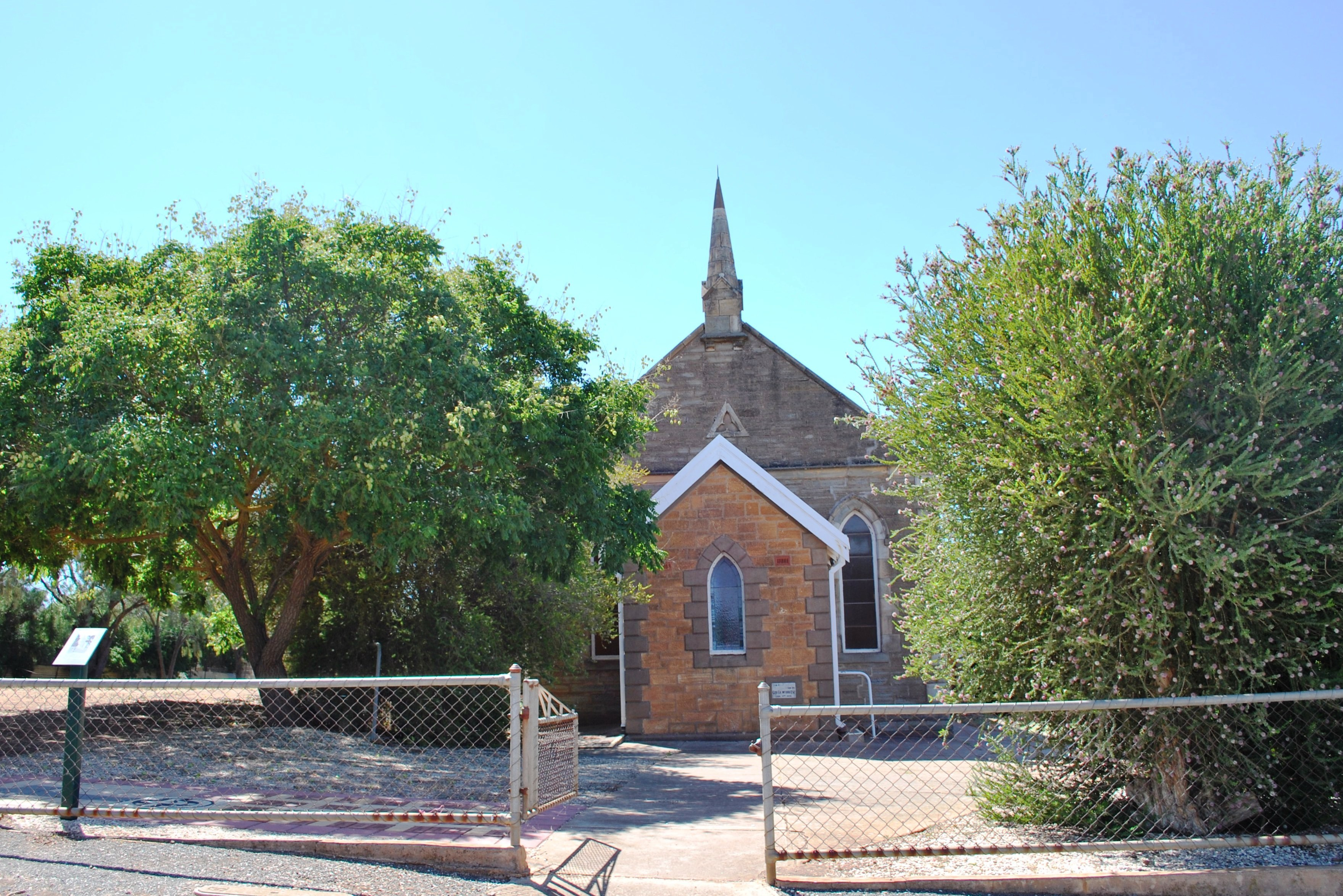
Church building

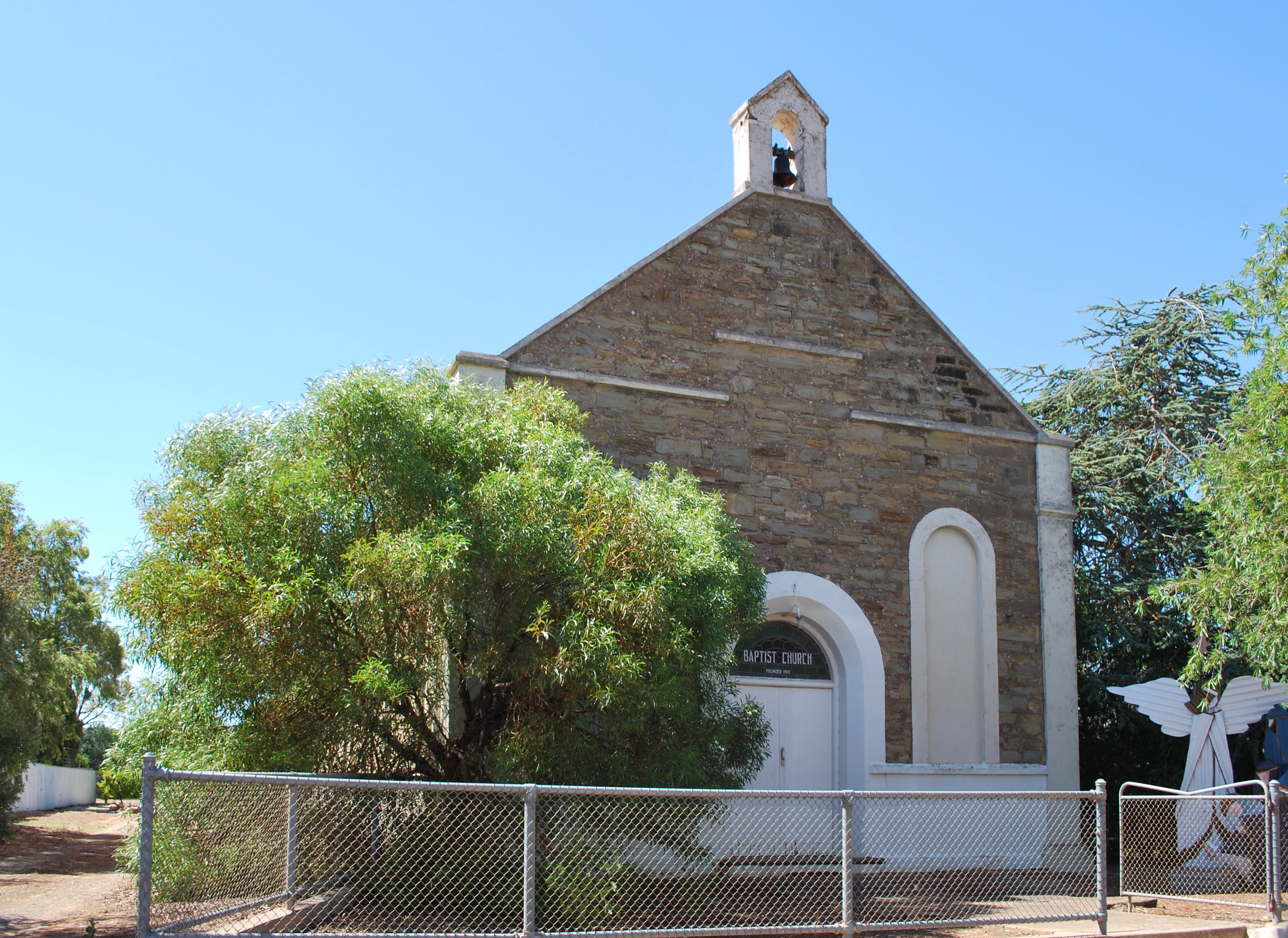
Baptist Church

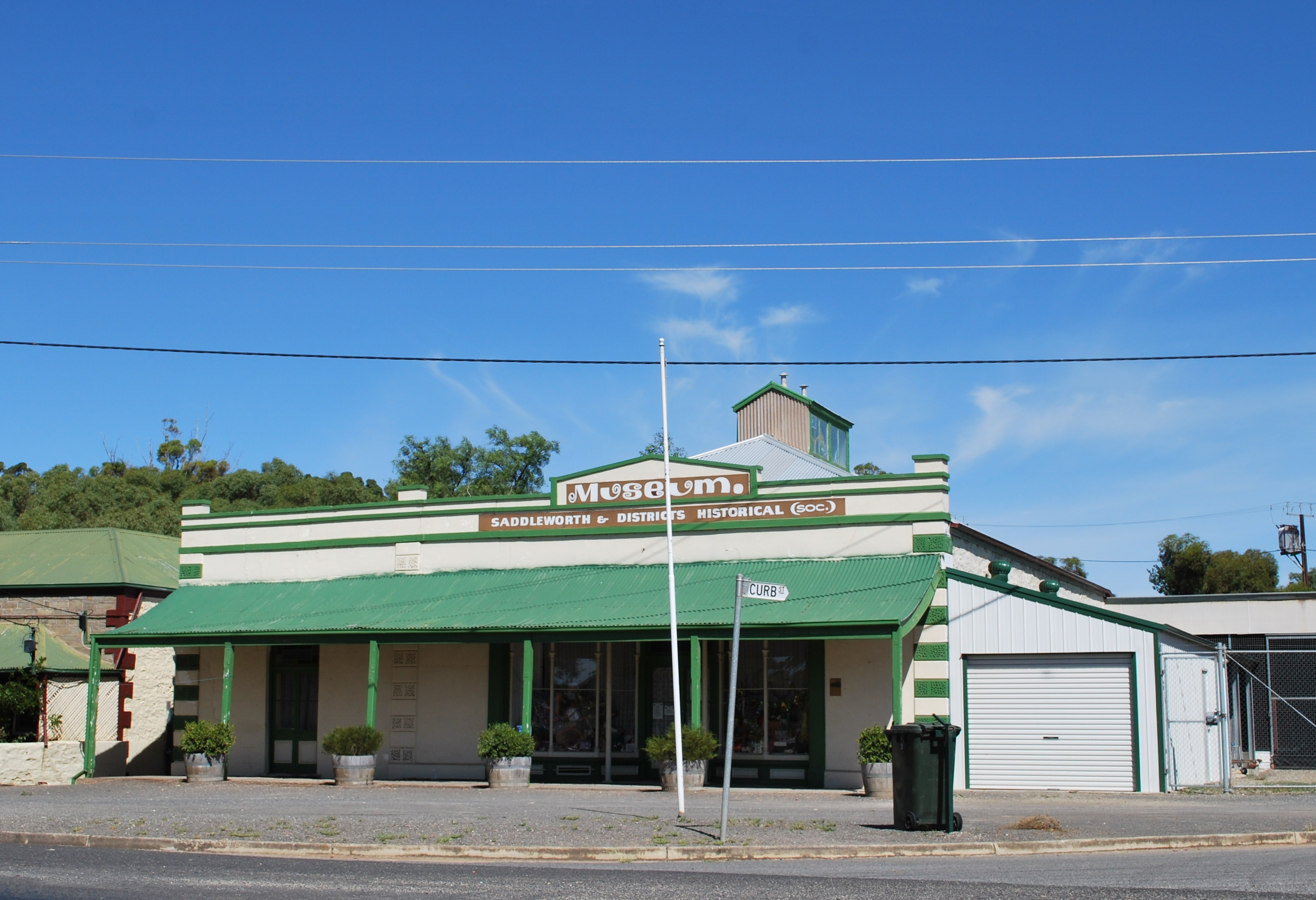
Museum

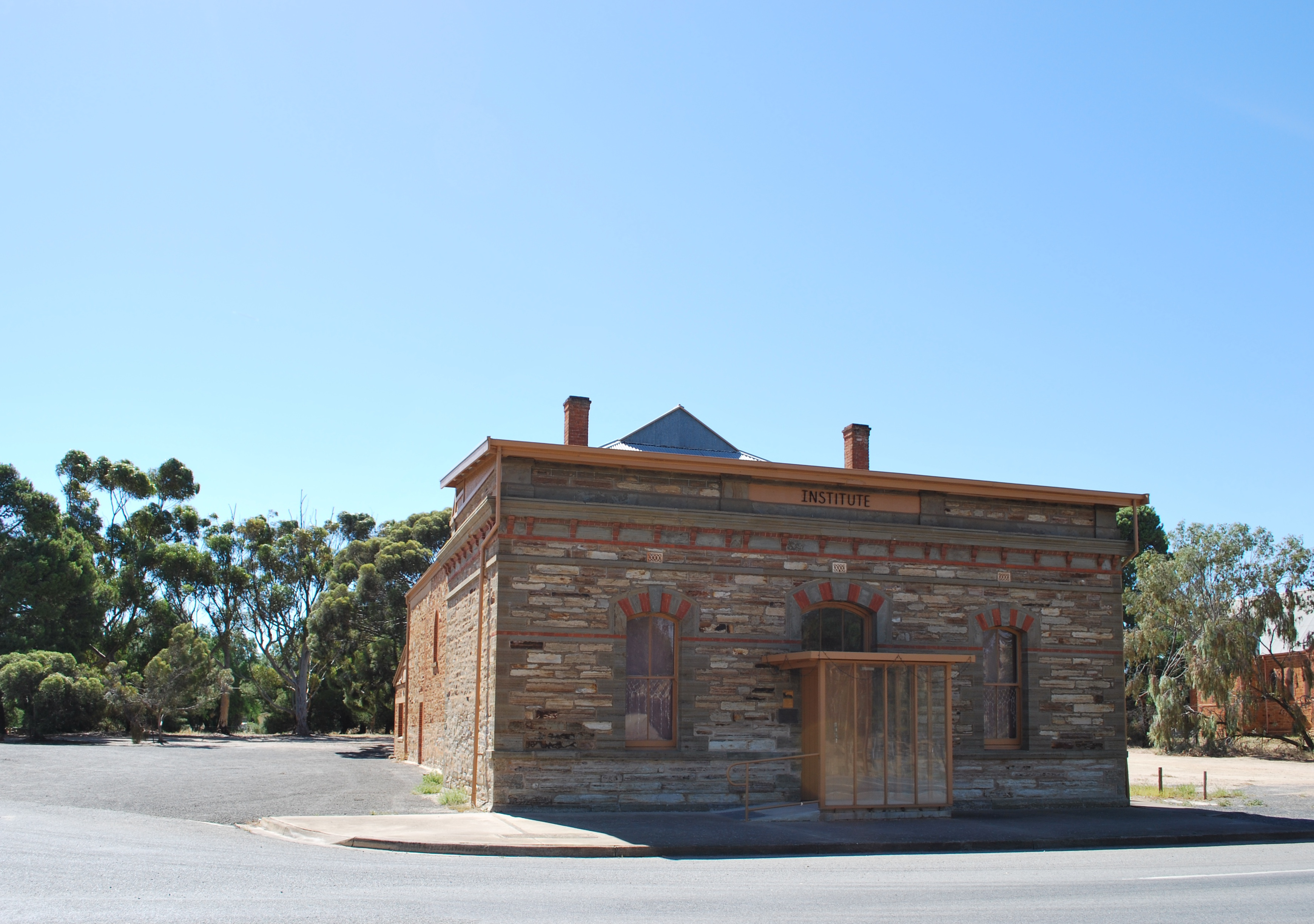
Literary institute

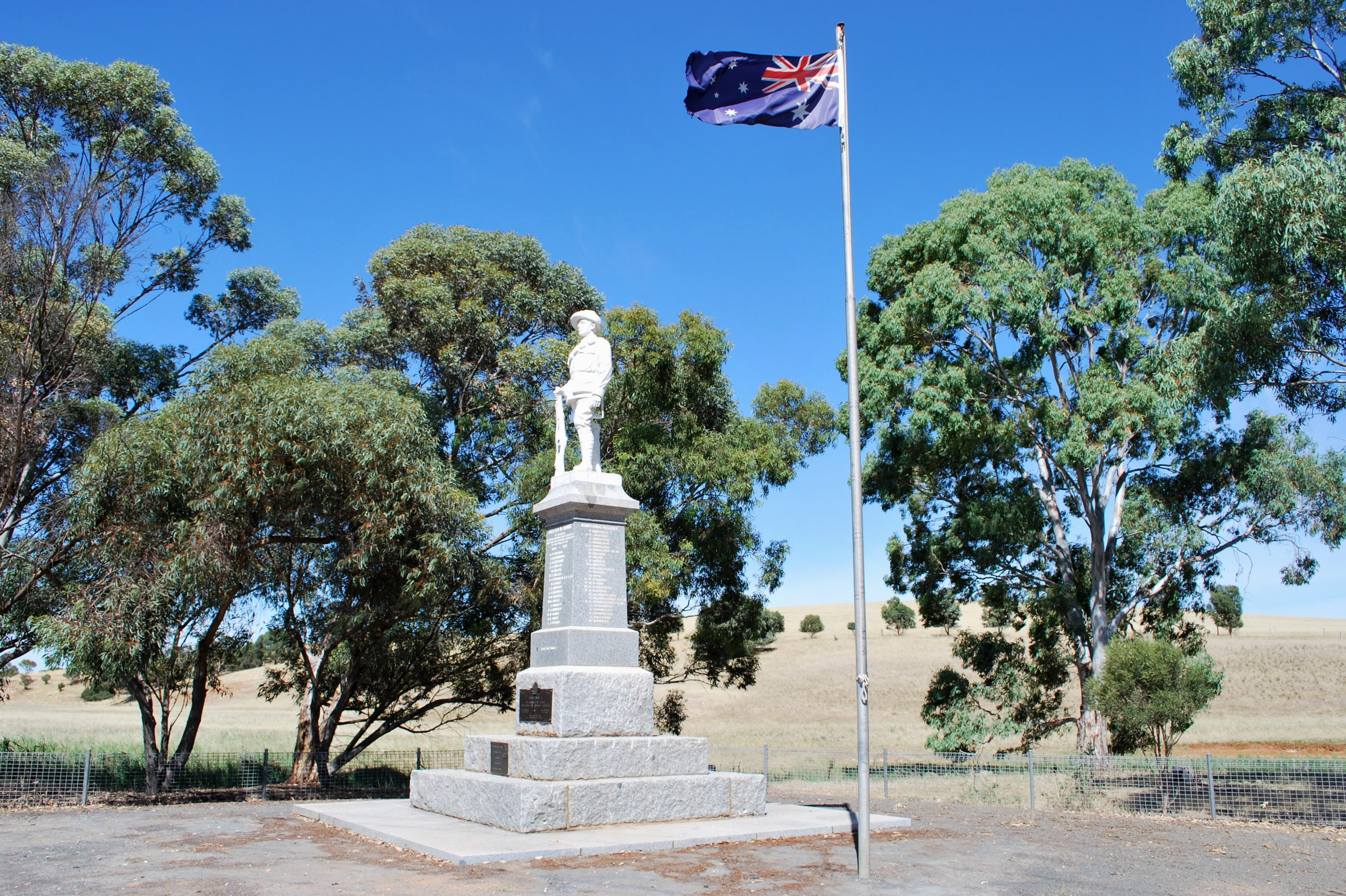
War memorial

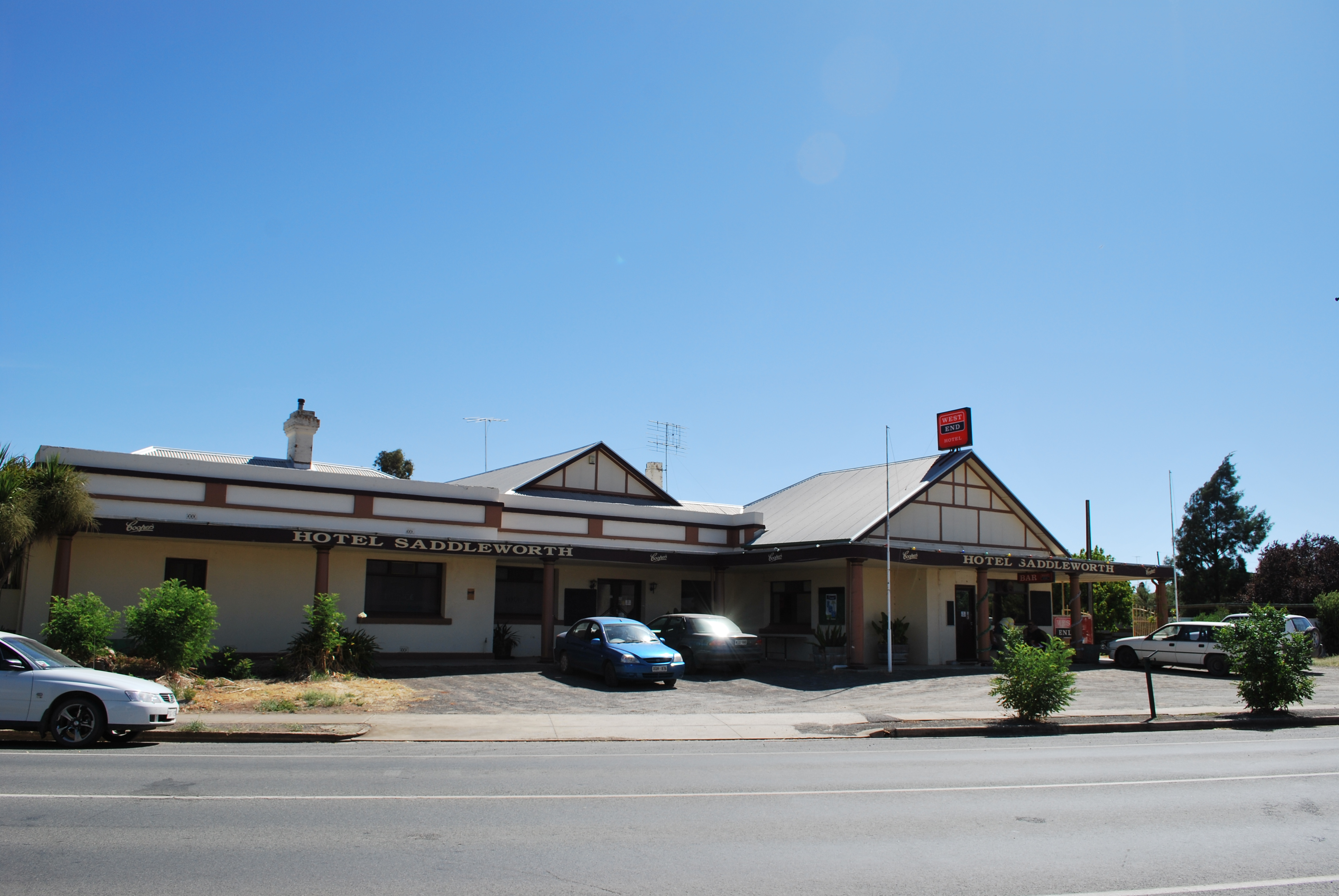
Saddleworth Hotel
