= Point Pass, South Australia =

Point Pass South Australia
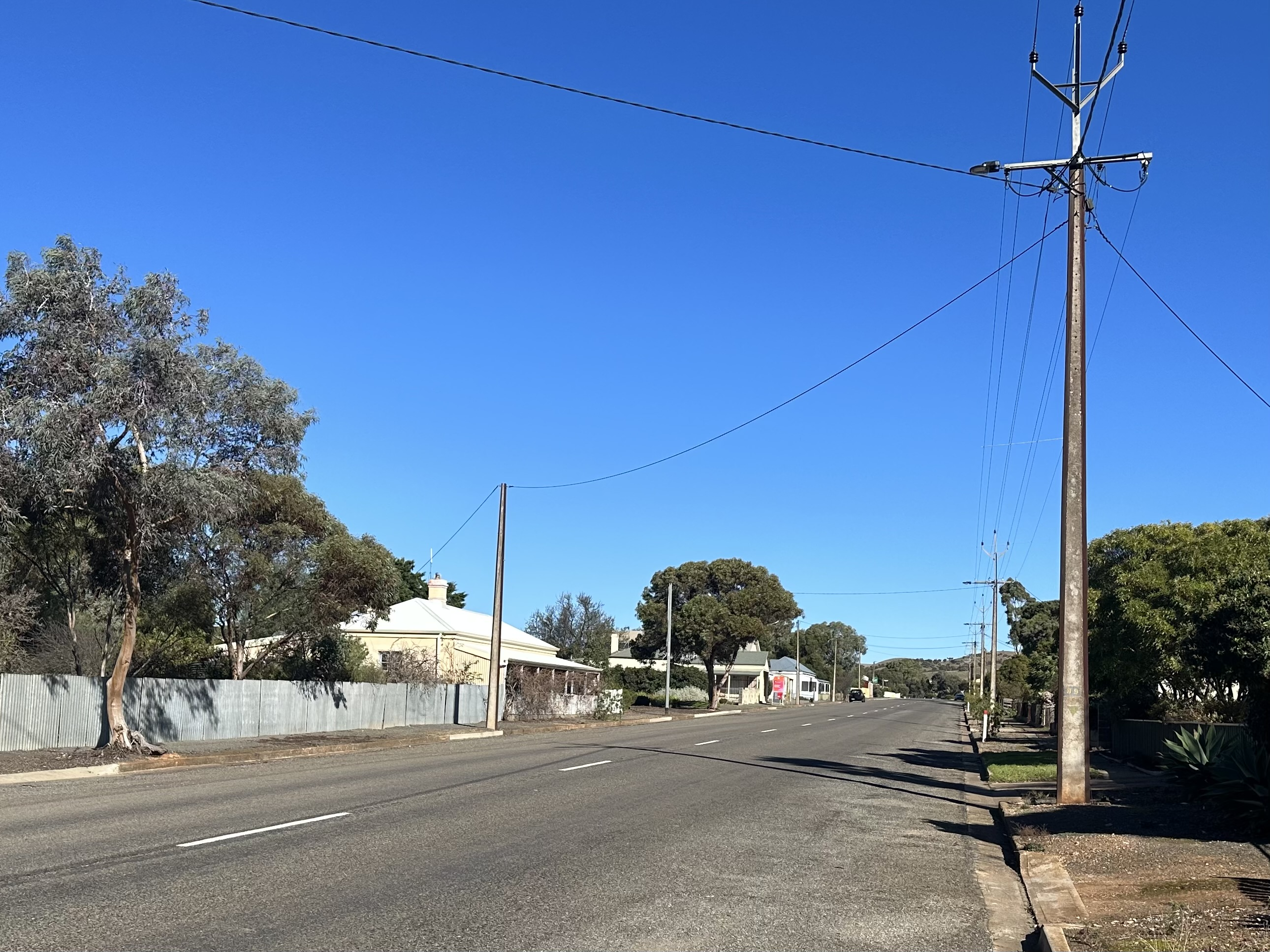
- Main Street of Point Pass, South Australia

- Coordinates: 34°4′32″S 139°3′2″E
- Population: 123 (SAL 2021)
- Postcode(s): 5380
- Location: 115 km (71 mi) N of Adelaide; 11 km (7 mi) N of Eudunda; 45 km (28 mi) S of Burra
- LGA(s): Regional Council of Goyder
- State electorate(s): Stuart
- Federal division(s): Grey
Localities around Point Pass:
	Robertstown
Ngapala	Point Pass	Australia Plains
Julia	Eudunda

Point Pass is a small town in the Mid North of South Australia, 115 kilometres north of Adelaide. It is located 11 kilometres (6.8 mi) north of Eudunda, in the Regional Council of Goyder. As of 2021, the population of Point Pass was 123.

The town's main amenities include a hotel with social club, district hall with an Australia Post Community Postal Agent, and a Lutheran church. The local oval in Point Pass has been transformed into a campground, while the Point Pass Standpipe Reserve offers public BBQ facilities.

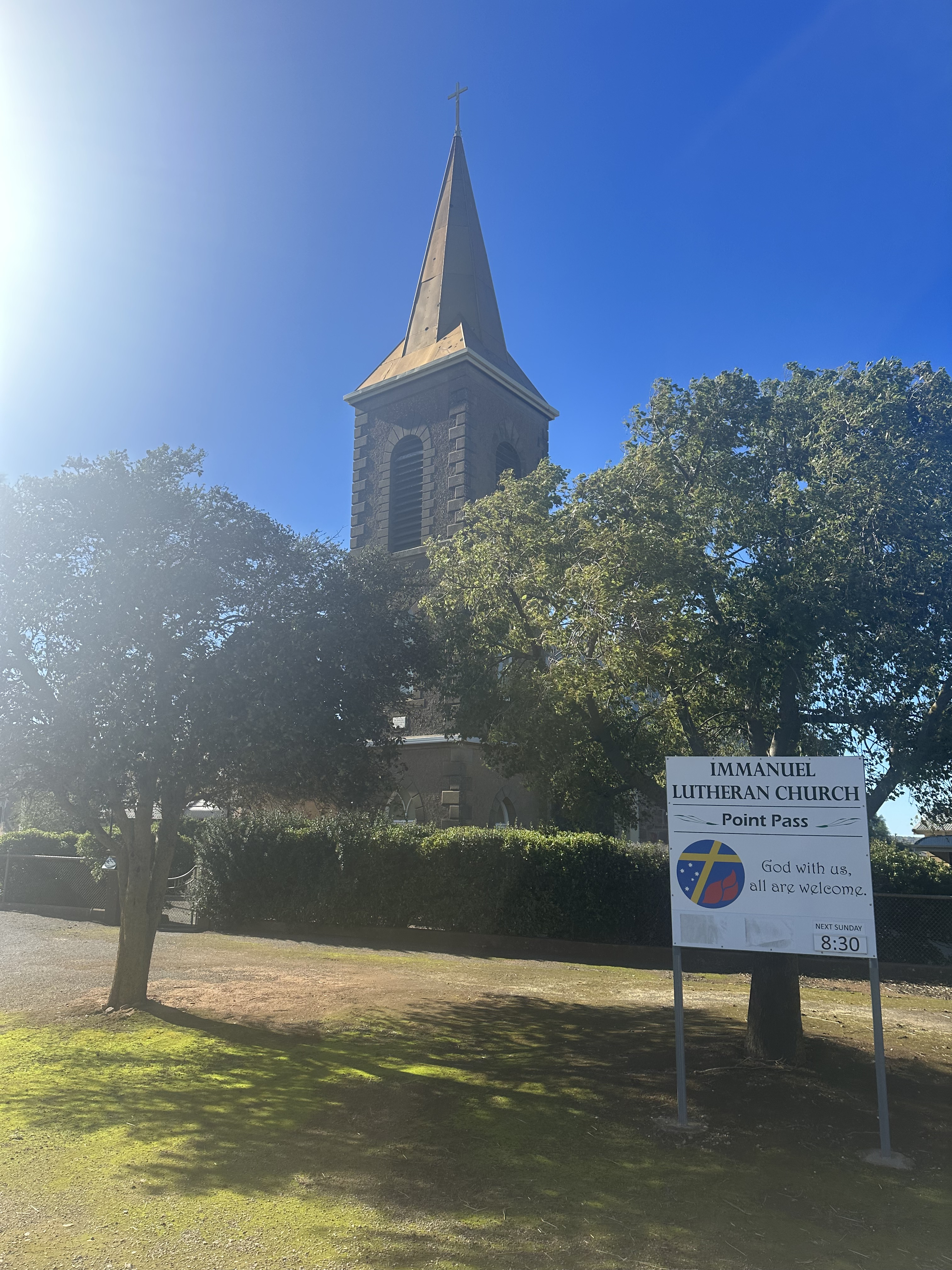
Point Pass Immanuel Lutheran Church

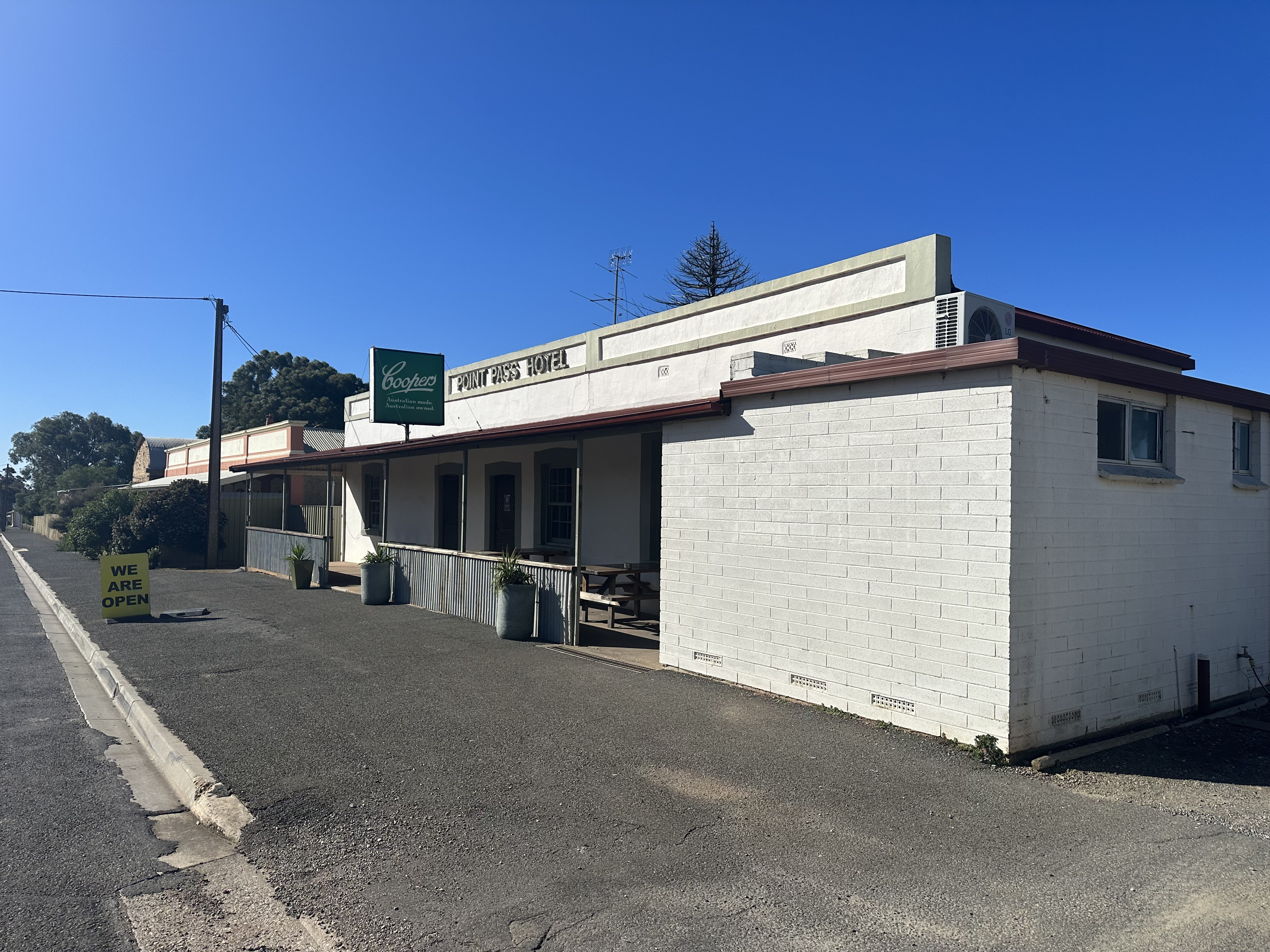
Point Pass Hotel

== Etymology ==
Point Pass is thought to have been named after the Northern Irish town of Poyntzpass by Irish immigrant Mrs Anne Richards.

== History ==
The area is the traditional lands of the Ngadjuri people. The Ngadjuri have been largely overlooked in the histories of colonisation and the subsequent dispossession from their traditional lands.

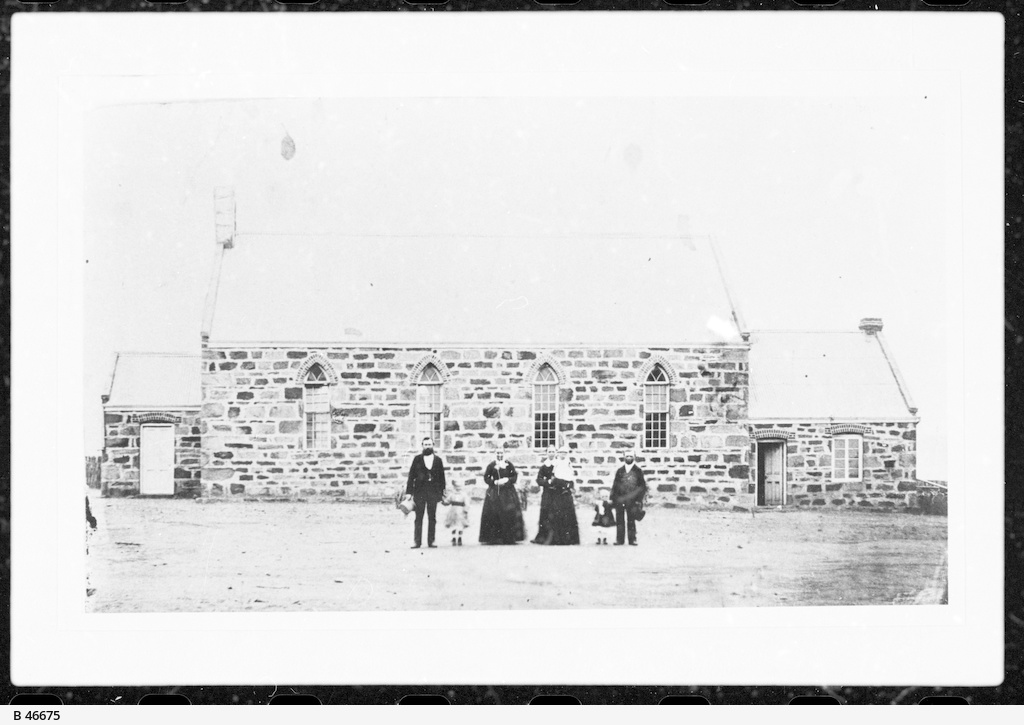
Immanuel Lutheran Church, 1880

Point Pass was first colonised by German Lutheran immigrants in 1868. The Point Pass Immanuel Lutheran Church opened in 1876, led by pastor J.M. Stolz. The church was made of local stone with a gold spire. A Lemke pipe organ, made in the Barossa Valley, was installed the same year.

Two years later, a manse was also built. A Lutheran seminary and training college, called Immanuel College, followed in 1895. In 1913, a half-tonne bell from Germany was added to the steeple spire. The site also includes Emmaus Lutheran Cemetery. This building complex is a major feature both in the town and in the Lutheran heritage of South Australia.

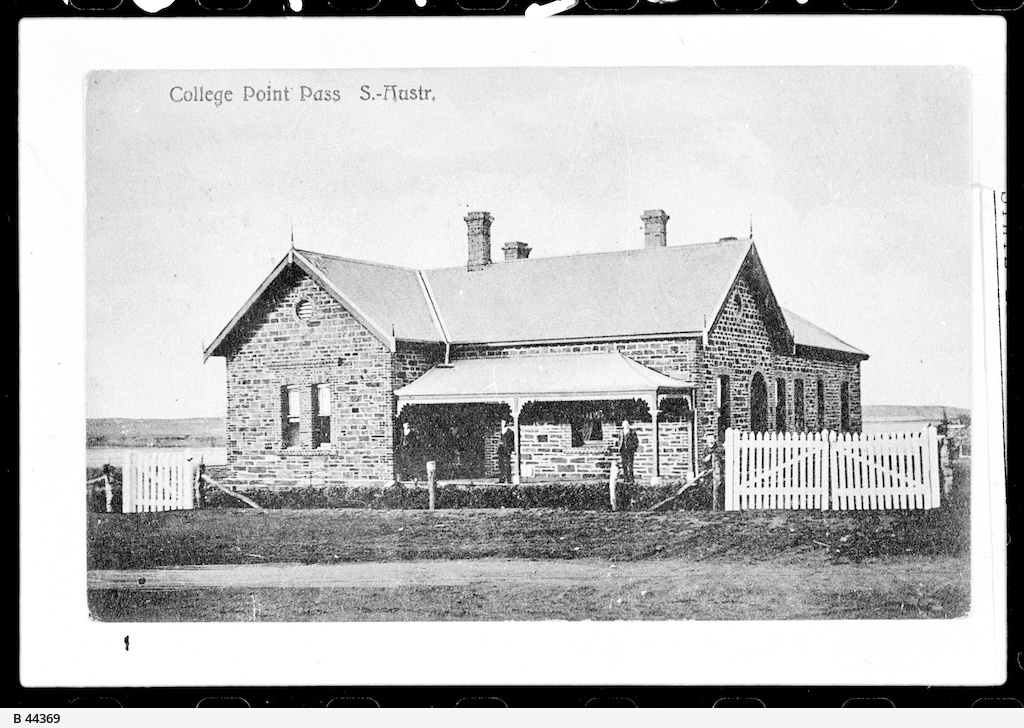
Immanuel Lutheran College, 1900

A Lutheran primary school, Emmaus School, was established by Point Pass in 1882. It underwent a transition to become a state school in 1891 but eventually closed its doors in 1945 when Eudunda Area School was opened. Additionally, a second Lutheran church named St. Peter's, along with its cemetery, was established in 1885. However, it is no longer in operation and has been converted into a private residence.

Immanuel College moved to North Adelaide in 1927, where it remains operational as a private Lutheran secondary school. In 1939, the final German language church services held in the district were conducted at Immanuel Lutheran Church, due the outbreak of World War Two and associated anti-German sentiment.

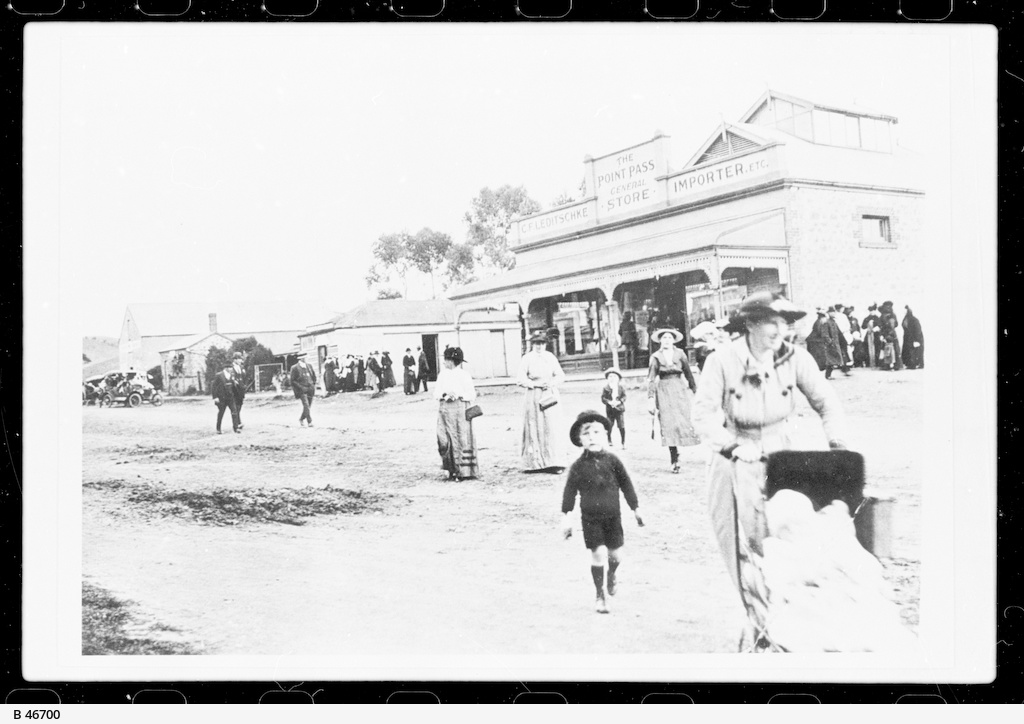
Main Street, 1910

Throughout its history, the town has been home to various businesses and organisations, encompassing a range of trades and services. These include a blacksmith, butter factory, carpenter, council chambers, and hospital. In 1876, a general store was established, but it ceased operations in 1973. The Point Pass Hotel, which first opened its doors in 1876, continues to operate to this day, as of 2023. St Mary's Anglican Church opened in 1906 and closed in 2016, and has since been converted into a private residence. Additionally, the Point Pass District Hall was established in 1927.

Point Pass was previously a stop on the Robertstown railway line from 1914 until 1990. The Point Pass Speedway opened in 1961 and closed in 1968.

== Demographics ==
As of 2021, Point Pass had a population consisting of 46.7% female residents and 53.3% male residents, with a median age of 52 years old. The town comprises 68 dwellings, each of which is a detached house, with an average of 2.5 residents per dwelling. Home ownership in Point Pass surpasses the state average, while rental and mortgage payments tend to be lower compared to the state average. On average, households in Point Pass possess 2.6 cars.

The predominant ancestries reported by Point Pass residents include Australian, English, German, South Sudanese, and Irish. There were no reported Aboriginal Australian residents in the town. Point Pass has a higher proportion of Lutheran residents compared to the state average, primarily due to the town's historical background, with approximately 23% identifying as Lutherans compared to the state average of 2.4%.

In terms of education, a lower percentage of Point Pass residents have completed post-secondary education in comparison to the state average. Similarly, slightly fewer residents are currently active in the workforce when compared to the state average. The most common employment sectors among Point Pass residents are community and personal service workers, as well as machinery operators and drivers, with incomes generally lower than the state average.

== Nature and landmarks ==
The Lavender Federation Trail is a long-distance hiking trail that runs through Point Pass. Additionally, there is a 14 km loop trail at Point Pass that is part of the Lavender Federation Trail.

The nearby Gerkie Gap to Webb Gap section of the Heysen Trail traverses the scenic Tothill Ranges, renowned for preserving the largest remaining portion of untouched bushland in the region. There are two walk-in campsites adjacent to Point Pass along this section, Smith Hill and Webb Gap.

Scenic lookout Inspiration Point lies approximately 10 km north of Point Pass.

Historic Anlaby Station lies approximately 20 km south-west of Point Pass.

== Notable residents ==
- Frieda Keysser and Carl Strehlow, missionaries known for reducing First Nations infant mortality rates in the Northern Territory, were married at Immanuel Lutheran Church in on 1895.
- Paul Gotthelf Pfeiffer, poet and tutor, was born in Point Pass in 1916. Known for his poem "Spain," which won the University of Adelaide's Bundey Prize, Pfeiffer co-founded the Angry Penguins journal with Max Harris. He died during World War II in 1945.
