= Eudunda =

- Town
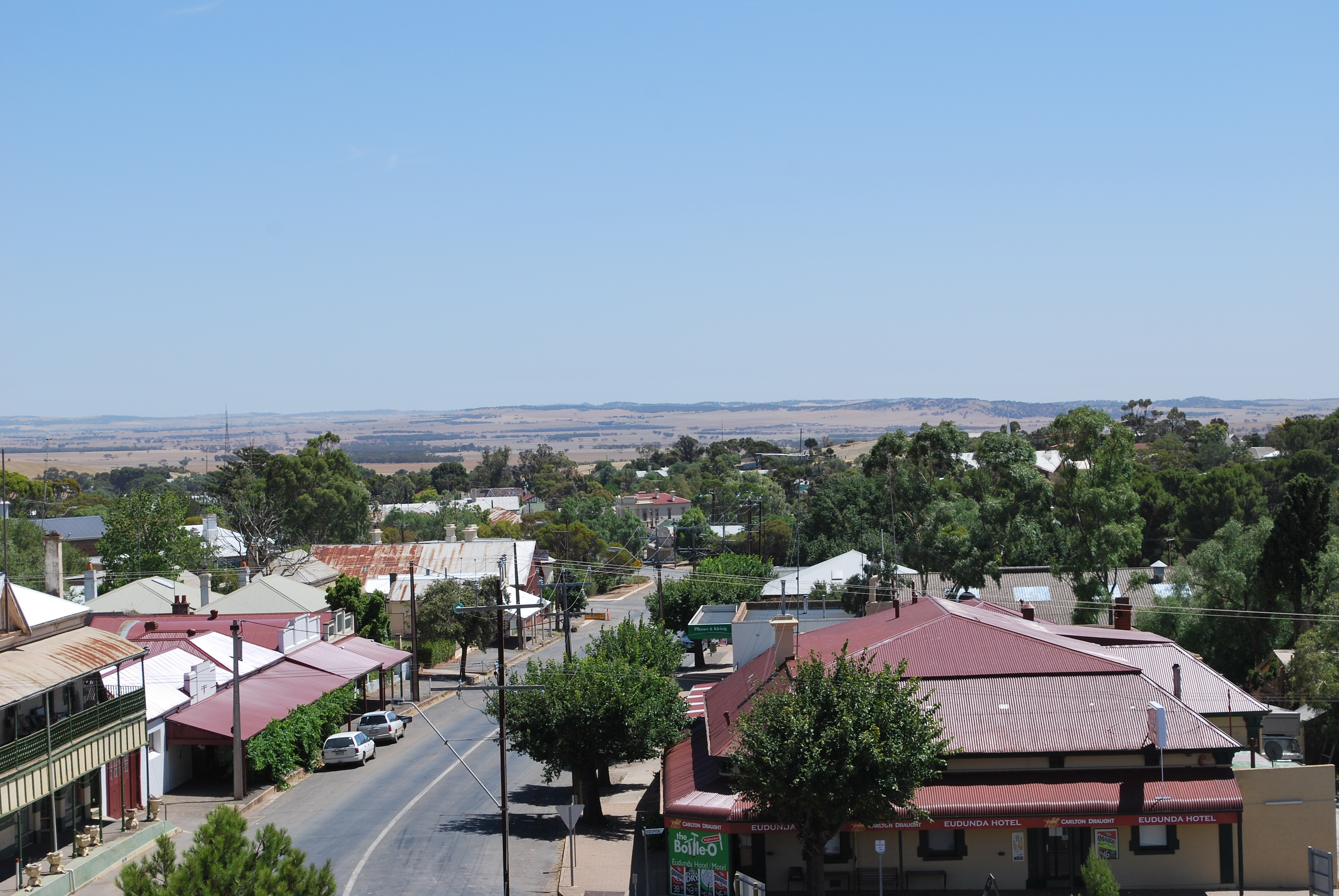
- Eudunda seen from the town lookout

- Coordinates: 34°10′0″S 139°05′0″E
- Country: Australia
- State: South Australia
- LGA: Regional Council of Goyder
- Location: 103 km (64 mi) NE of Adelaide; 27 km (17 mi) NW of Kapunda

Government
  - State electorate: Stuart
  - Federal division: Grey

Population
  - Total: 601 (UCL 2021)
- Postcode: 5374
- County: Eyre; Light
- Mean max temp: 21.1 °C (70.0 °F)
- Mean min temp: 9.3 °C (48.7 °F)
- Annual rainfall: 448.6 mm (17.66 in)
Localities around Eudunda
Julia	Point Pass	Australia Plains
Hampden	Eudunda	Peep Hill, Sutherlands
Buchanan, Hansborough	Dutton	Neales Flat

Eudunda is an agricultural service town in the Mid North region of South Australia, 111 kilometres (69 miles) north-east of Adelaide in the jurisdiction of the Regional Council of Goyder. As of 2021, the town had a population of 601 people. Eudunda is renowned as the birthplace of author and educator Colin Thiele.

== Origin of name ==
The town name of Eudunda originates from the name of the spring to the west of the town, which local Aboriginal people called judandakawi, meaning "sheltered water". The earliest-known written mention of the name Eudunda was published in The Express and Telegraph in 1872.

== History ==
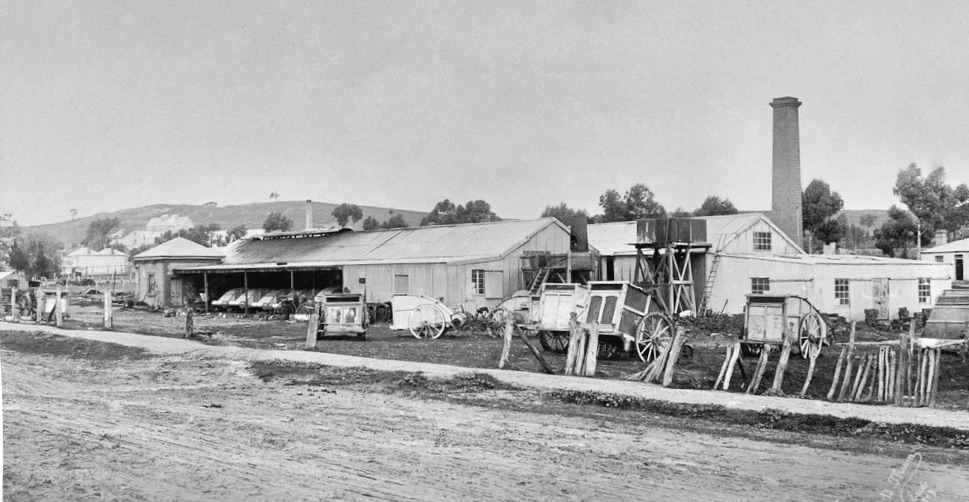
The Lutz Bros farm machinery factory in 1903

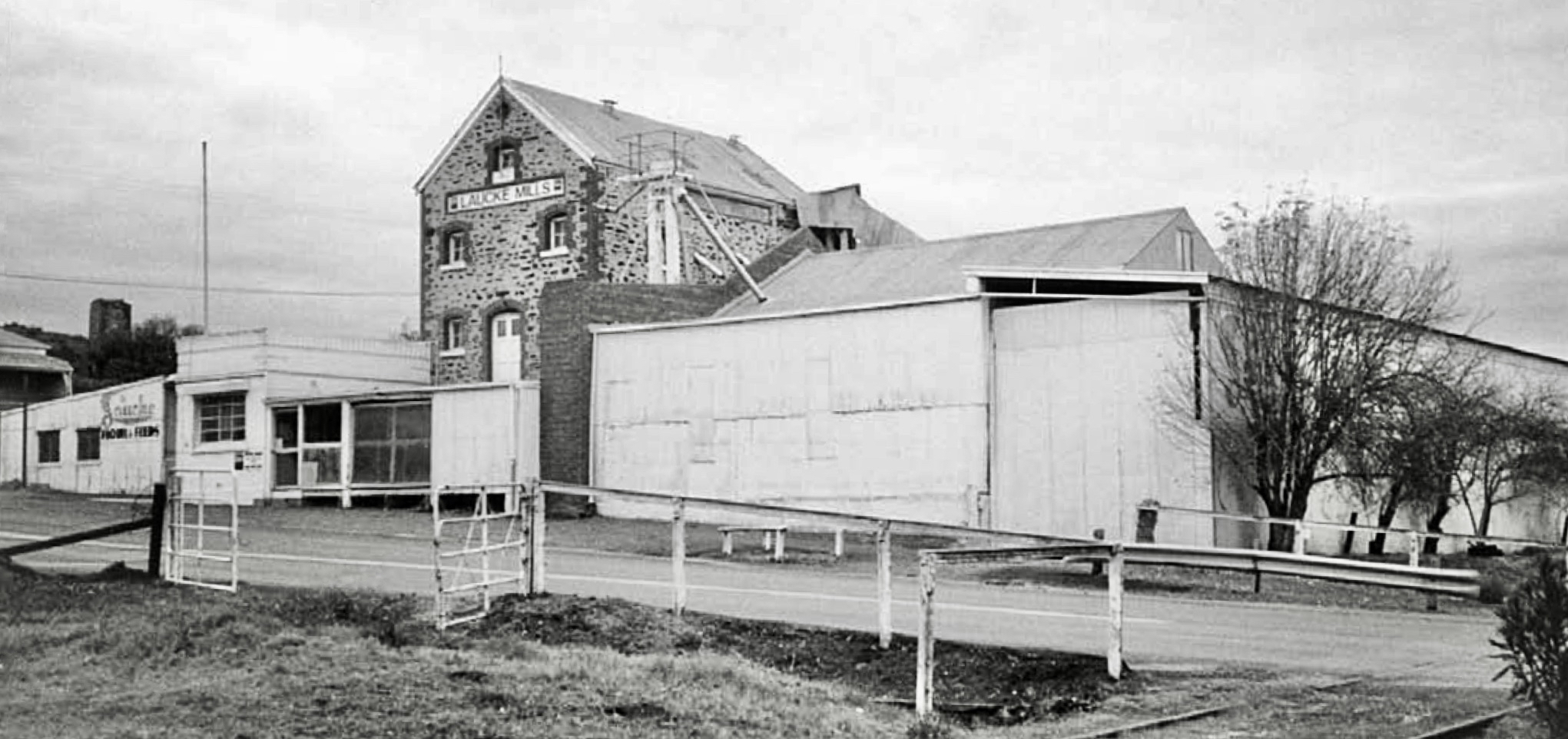
The mill, built in 1879, operated for 111 years

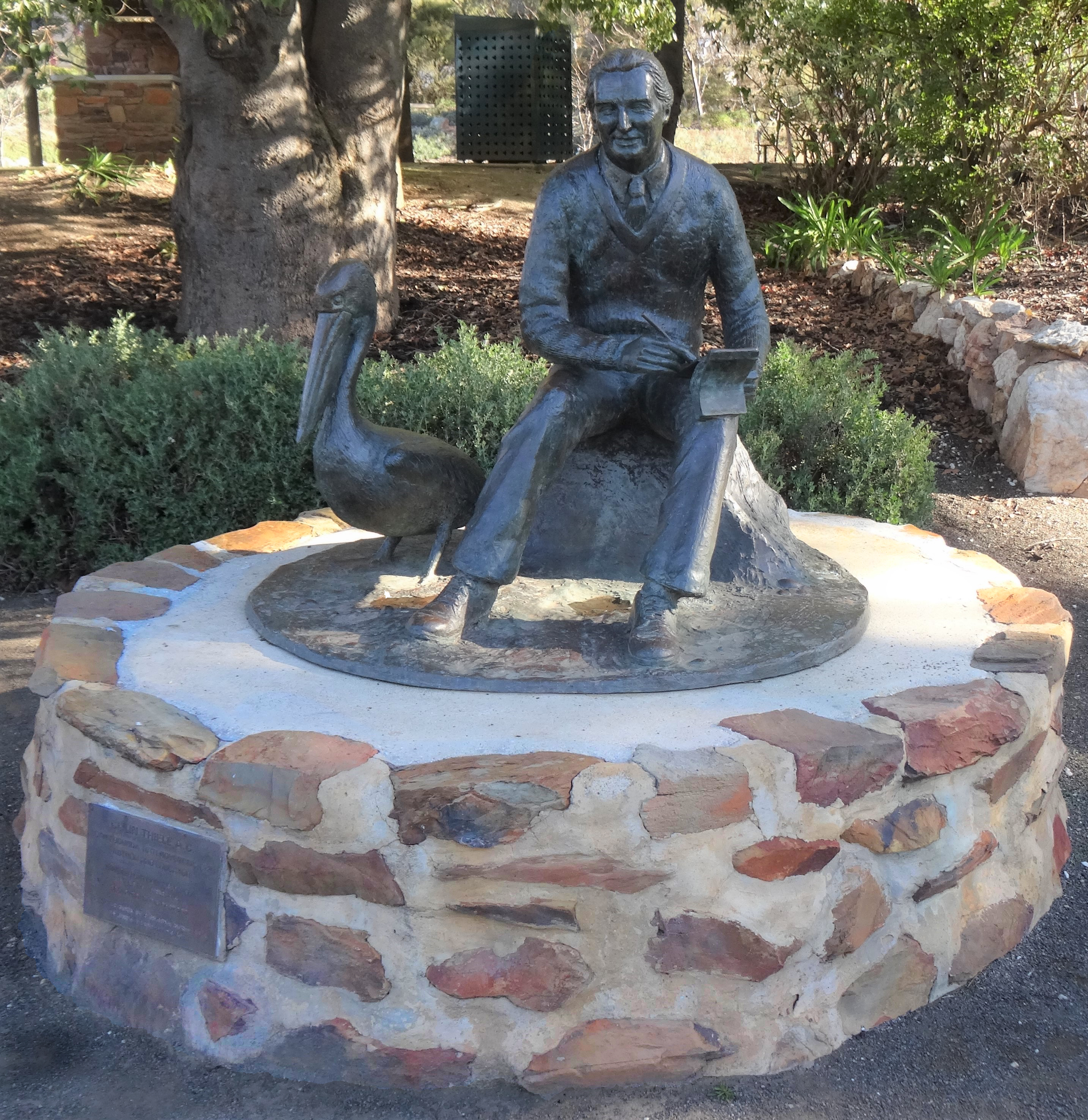
A statue in Eudunda of Colin Thiele and Mr Percival, a character in his novel Storm Boy

Eudunda is within the traditional lands of the Ngadjuri people.

The first Europeans in the area were those travelling to Adelaide markets from New South Wales and Queensland in the 1830s. In 1838, four livestock importers from the eastern colonies, John Hill, William Wood, Charles Willis and John Oakden, embarked on a journey to bring livestock overland from New South Wales to South Australia, following the Murray River, naming landmarks along the way. Shortly after, pastoralists such as Frederick Dutton took up sheep grazing runs in the area.

Eudunda township was established in 1870 by John Henry Hannan, who owned the land that was surveyed and divided for sale. The first European settlers were primarily German Lutheran immigrants. In 1874, Friedrich Gotthilf Ernst Appelt opened Appelt's General Store on South Terrace. The building is listed on the South Australian Heritage Register.

The town became the centre of local government in 1878 with the establishment of the District Council of Neales, which operated until 1932 when it merged with the District Council of Julia to create the District Council of Eudunda. It continued until 1997 when it was replaced by the formation of the Regional Council of Goyder.

A major business, founded in 1884 by Johannes Wiesner and Gustav Hilbig, was the Eudunda Machine Factory, known for its forges and production of plough and scarifier shares. The business changed hands several times, with Carl and Heinrich Lutz taking over in 1895 and gaining recognition for their strippers, which were widely sold in New South Wales and Victoria. Theodor and Georg Jansen took over in 1905, expanding the business and diversifying into servicing motor vehicles when they started to became more prevalent. In 1951, Johannes and Leslie Reimann acquired the Jansen Brothers business. as of 2023 it continues as Reimann Manufacturing.

The Eudunda Farmers Co-operative Society, established in 1896, was formed by a group of traders in firewood who faced economic challenges during the 1890s. Frustrated with middlemen refusing to pay in cash, they decided to trade directly on the Adelaide market. This successful venture led to the establishment of the co-operative, which came to own 62 general stores across South Australia. Eudunda Farmers merged with United Supermarkets in the 1990s, and their stores became Foodland and IGA supermarkets.

During the First World War, Eudunda, with its strong German culture, experienced a series of events fuelled by anti-German sentiment. In early 1915, a local Lutheran pastor was arrested for communicating with the Attorney-General of South Australia, Hermann Homburg, about naturalisation matters. Although the pastor was released shortly after, another incident took place in February of that year. The Citizen's Forces conducted raids on the homes and businesses of both German-born and Australian-born Eudunda residents. Travel in and out of the town was restricted by sentries stationed at its entrances. Although the raids yielded no incriminating evidence, they served as a clear message that the authorities were committed to suppressing any disloyal sentiments.

In 1920, author and educator Colin Thiele was born at Mutter Knabe's Nursing Home. His upbringing in nearby Julia, and his education in Eudunda, served as inspiration for many of his writings.

The Eudunda Courier and Murray Flats Advertiser was first published in Eudunda in 1922. Ownership changed in 1928 and again in 1948. However, in 1978, following the death of V.H. Baehnisch, the newspaper ceased operation. It was later taken over by a local family after negotiations. In 1981, ownership shifted to Barossa News, and the Eudunda Courier became a supplement to the Barossa Herald. Eventually, the title was dropped, and today Eudunda news is covered by The Leader, based in Angaston.

Edwin Davey, a flour miller from Angaston, built a chaff mill in 1879, soon after the arrival of the railway. Its last owner was Laucke Flour Mills, from 1951 to 1990.

== Climate ==
Climate data for Eudunda (1991–2020 normals, extremes 1965–present)
Month	Jan	Feb	Mar	Apr	May	Jun	Jul	Aug	Sep	Oct	Nov	Dec	Year
Record high °C (°F)	45.0 (113.0)	43.9 (111.0)	40.0 (104.0)	36.0 (96.8)	28.4 (83.1)	24.8 (76.6)	25.4 (77.7)	27.4 (81.3)	31.4 (88.5)	36.2 (97.2)	41.5 (106.7)	44.0 (111.2)	45.0 (113.0)
Mean daily maximum °C (°F)	30.1 (86.2)	29.5 (85.1)	26.1 (79.0)	21.8 (71.2)	17.2 (63.0)	13.9 (57.0)	13.4 (56.1)	14.6 (58.3)	17.7 (63.9)	21.6 (70.9)	25.2 (77.4)	27.6 (81.7)	21.5 (70.7)
Daily mean °C (°F)	22.3 (72.1)	22.0 (71.6)	19.2 (66.6)	15.9 (60.6)	12.5 (54.5)	9.9 (49.8)	9.3 (48.7)	10.0 (50.0)	12.1 (53.8)	14.9 (58.8)	18.0 (64.4)	20.1 (68.2)	15.5 (59.9)
Mean daily minimum °C (°F)	14.5 (58.1)	14.5 (58.1)	12.3 (54.1)	9.9 (49.8)	7.7 (45.9)	5.8 (42.4)	5.2 (41.4)	5.3 (41.5)	6.6 (43.9)	8.3 (46.9)	10.8 (51.4)	12.7 (54.9)	9.5 (49.1)
Record low °C (°F)	5.1 (41.2)	5.1 (41.2)	0.7 (33.3)	−0.9 (30.4)	−1.0 (30.2)	−1.3 (29.7)	−2.2 (28.0)	−2.0 (28.4)	0.0 (32.0)	0.4 (32.7)	1.7 (35.1)	3.2 (37.8)	−2.2 (28.0)
Average precipitation mm (inches)	26.9 (1.06)	24.8 (0.98)	20.3 (0.80)	33.7 (1.33)	38.6 (1.52)	54.0 (2.13)	49.9 (1.96)	55.0 (2.17)	51.7 (2.04)	35.1 (1.38)	34.3 (1.35)	35.1 (1.38)	459.4 (18.09)
Average precipitation days (≥ 1.0 mm)	2.7	2.4	3.0	4.6	7.1	9.3	9.8	10.2	8.1	5.9	5.1	4.6	72.7
Average dew point °C (°F)	8.7 (47.7)	9.2 (48.6)	8.5 (47.3)	7.3 (45.1)	7.0 (44.6)	6.1 (43.0)	5.4 (41.7)	5.0 (41.0)	5.8 (42.4)	5.5 (41.9)	6.6 (43.9)	7.4 (45.3)	6.9 (44.4)
Source 1: National Oceanic and Atmospheric Administration
Source 2: Bureau of Meteorology

== Railway ==
Railway services were first introduced to Eudunda in September 1878, with the opening of the North-West Bend railway, later re-named the Morgan line, to the River Murray port of Morgan. From 1914, it was the junction station for a branch line running north past Point Pass to Robertstown. The Morgan railway line was cut back to Eudunda in November 1969. The Robertstown branch was closed in September 1991. The remaining line through Eudunda was closed in March 1994. The railway lines and yards have since been dismantled although the station building, and the old weighbridge & building, water tower and tank remain today.

== Demographics and economy ==
The 2021 Australian census counted the Eudunda population as 601 – a fairly stable number for the past four decades. The town exhibits a balanced gender distribution, with males accounting for 49.9% of the population, and females comprising 50.1%. The median age in Eudunda is 54 years. Eudunda has a total of 447 private dwellings, with an average of 2.1 people and 2 cars per household.

The town has residents born in Australia, England, Germany, the Netherlands, the Philippines, and New Zealand. 3.1% of the population identifies as Aboriginal and/or Torres Strait Islander. The town has a notable Lutheran community, comprising 24.2% of its residents who identify as Lutherans. This percentage is substantially higher compared to the state average of 2.4%, indicating the town's historical background.

Eudunda's unemployment rate was slightly lower than the state average, at 5.2%. The most common occupations in the town are managers, labourers, tradespeople, machinery operators and drivers, and clerical and administrative workers. The predominant industries in Eudunda include supermarkets, hospitals, farming, poultry processing, and building and other industrial cleaning services.

The median weekly household income of $921 is lower than the state average. However, the town has higher rates of home ownership compared to the state average, and the rent and mortgage repayments are lower as well.

== Education ==
Eudunda is home to several educational institutions, including the Eudunda Community Preschool Centre, St John's Lutheran School, and Eudunda Area School. St John's Lutheran School has a long-standing history, established in 1904, while Eudunda Area School was founded in 1948.

== Sports and recreation ==
Eudunda has several sports clubs catering to various interests, some of which are hosted at Eudunda Sporting Club. Eudunda's sporting clubs include:

- Eudunda Basketball Club Incorporated - Light Amateur Basketball Association
- Eudunda Bowling Club - Barossa & Light Bowling Association
- Eudunda Golf Club
- Eudunda & Robertstown Cricket Club - Barossa & Light Cricket Association
- Eudunda Robertstown Netball Club - North Eastern Netball Association
- Eudunda Robertstown Football Club - North Eastern Football League
- Eudunda Tennis Club - Julia & Light Tennis Association

Eudunda also has a children's playground and community swimming pool.

== Arts and culture ==
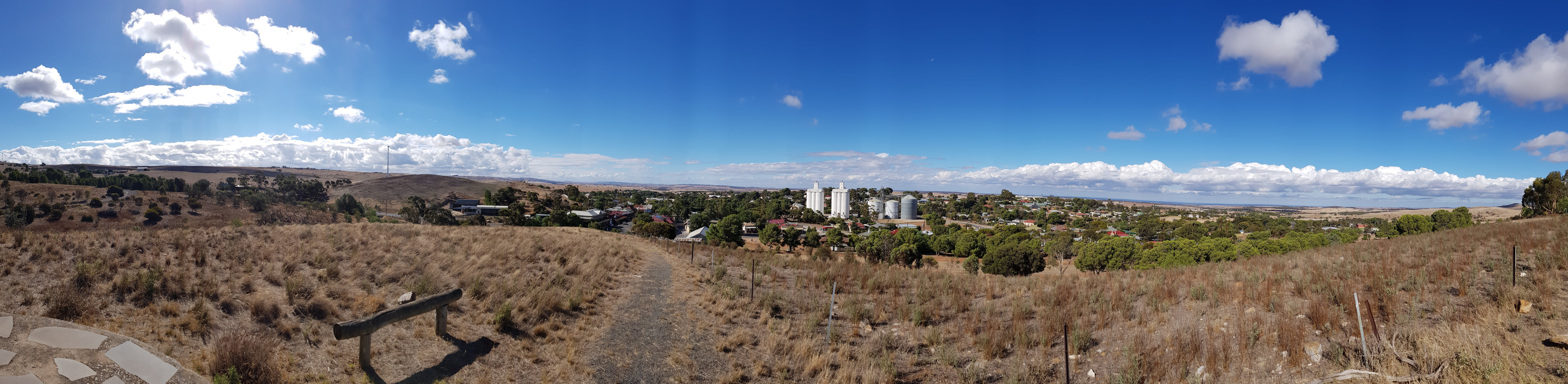
Panorama of Eudunda from the town lookout, looking north

The Eudunda Family Heritage Gallery is a volunteer-operated local history gallery that explores the heritage of the Eudunda region. Focusing on the pioneers and the broader history of the area from the 1840s onwards, visitors can access early cemetery records of Eudunda and the surrounding district, as well as a collection of local newspapers, photographs and memorabilia related to churches, schools, sporting associations, and various local organisations.

A bronze sculpture of Colin Thiele by artist Chris Radford is located in Eudunda's Centenary Gardens.

In September 2021, artist Sam Brooks completed a 30-metre-tall mural on the Eudunda silos, located in the former railway station precinct. One silo portrays Colin Thiele; on the other are two children sharing stories about their culture.

== Trails ==
Eudunda is home to several walking and driving trails:

- Eudunda Historic Walking Tour is a walking trail exploring Eudunda's built heritage, encompassing its industrial, agricultural, and trade history, religious influences, and educational development.
- Eudunda Mosaic Art Trail is a walking trail that features a collection of mosaic art created by the local community.
- Colin Thiele Driving Trail is a car trail of important locations from the author's life in Eudunda.
- Lavender Cycling Trail is a long-distance cycling trail that passes through Eudunda.
- Lavender Federation Trail is a long-distance hiking trail that passes through Eudunda.
- World's End Driving Trail is a car trail from Eudunda to Burra, showcasing rural landscapes of hills, valleys, gorges, and lagoons.

== Notable people ==
- Erhard F. Boehm, farmer and ornithologist
- Alexander Buchanan, stockman and early South Australia pioneer
- John Aloysius Chamberlain, sportsman
- Lance Duldig, cricketer
- Herbert Michael, politician
- Leslie Nicholson, politician
- Kane Richardson, cricketer
- Leslie Arthur Schubert, pastoralist and author
- Colin Thiele, author and educator
- Justin Westhoff, AFL footballer

== Gallery ==
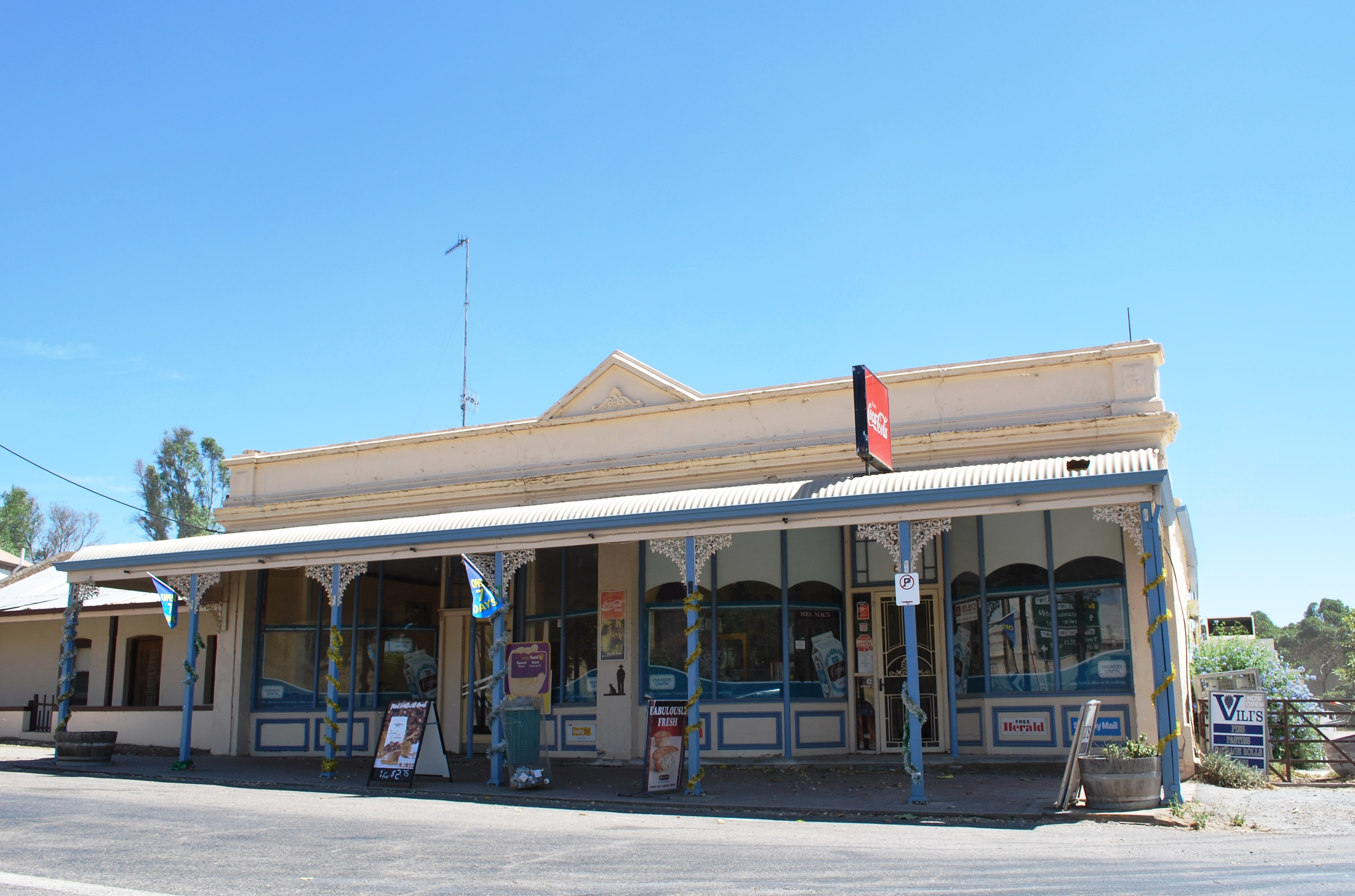
The former Appelt's General Store, now the Eudunda Roadhouse

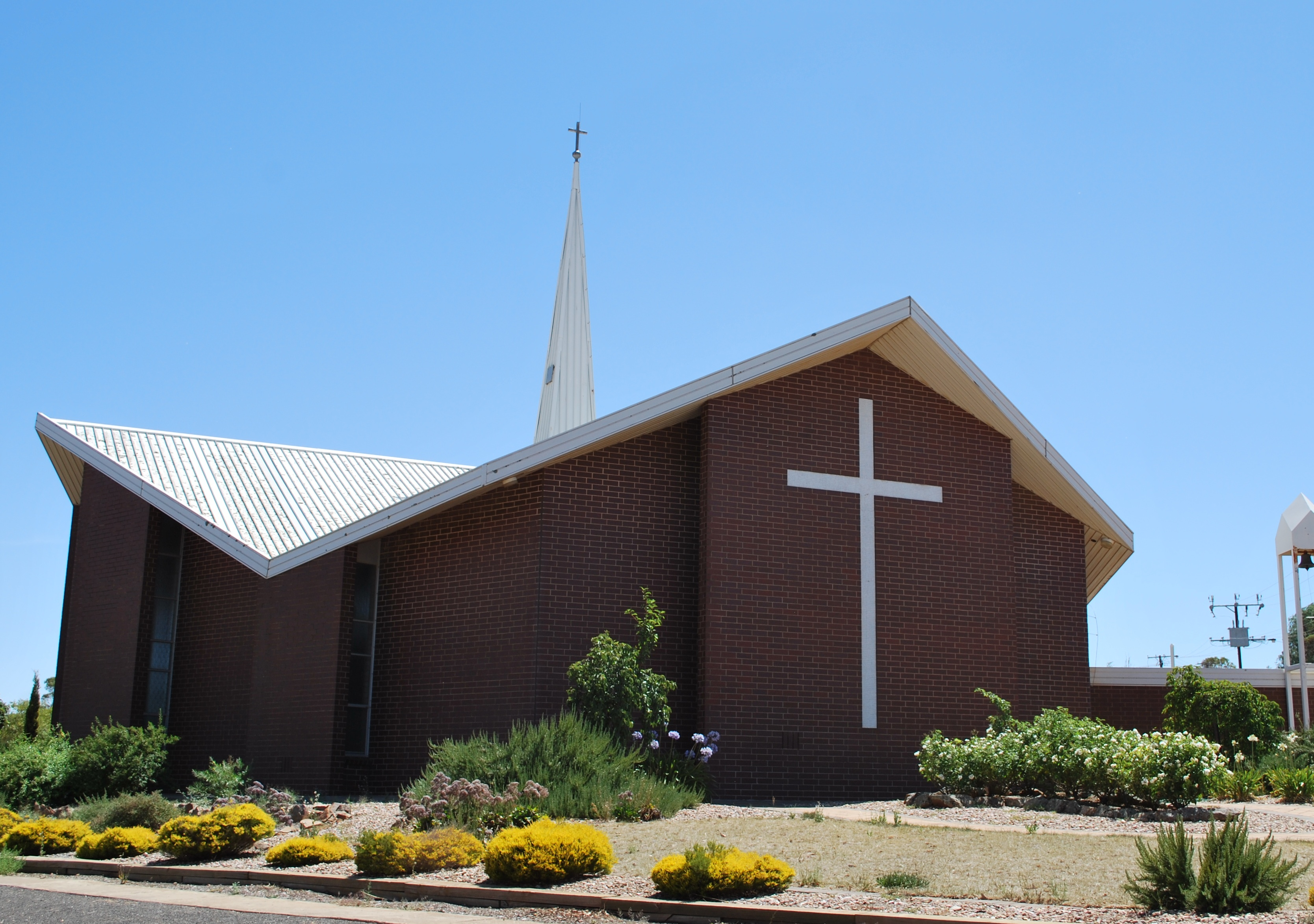
St John's Lutheran Church

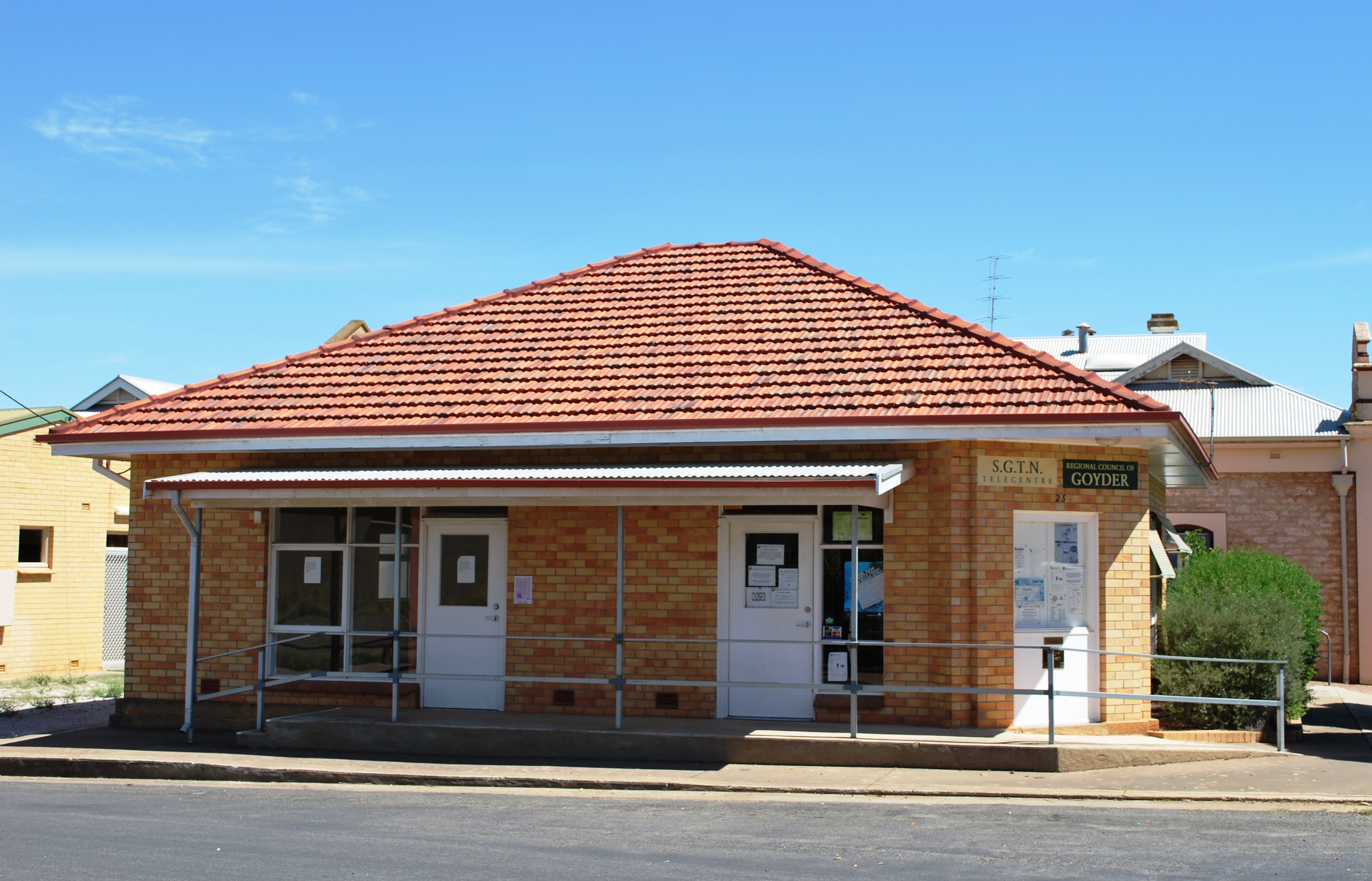
The Eudunda office of the Regional Council of Goyder, formerly the office of the District Council of Eudunda

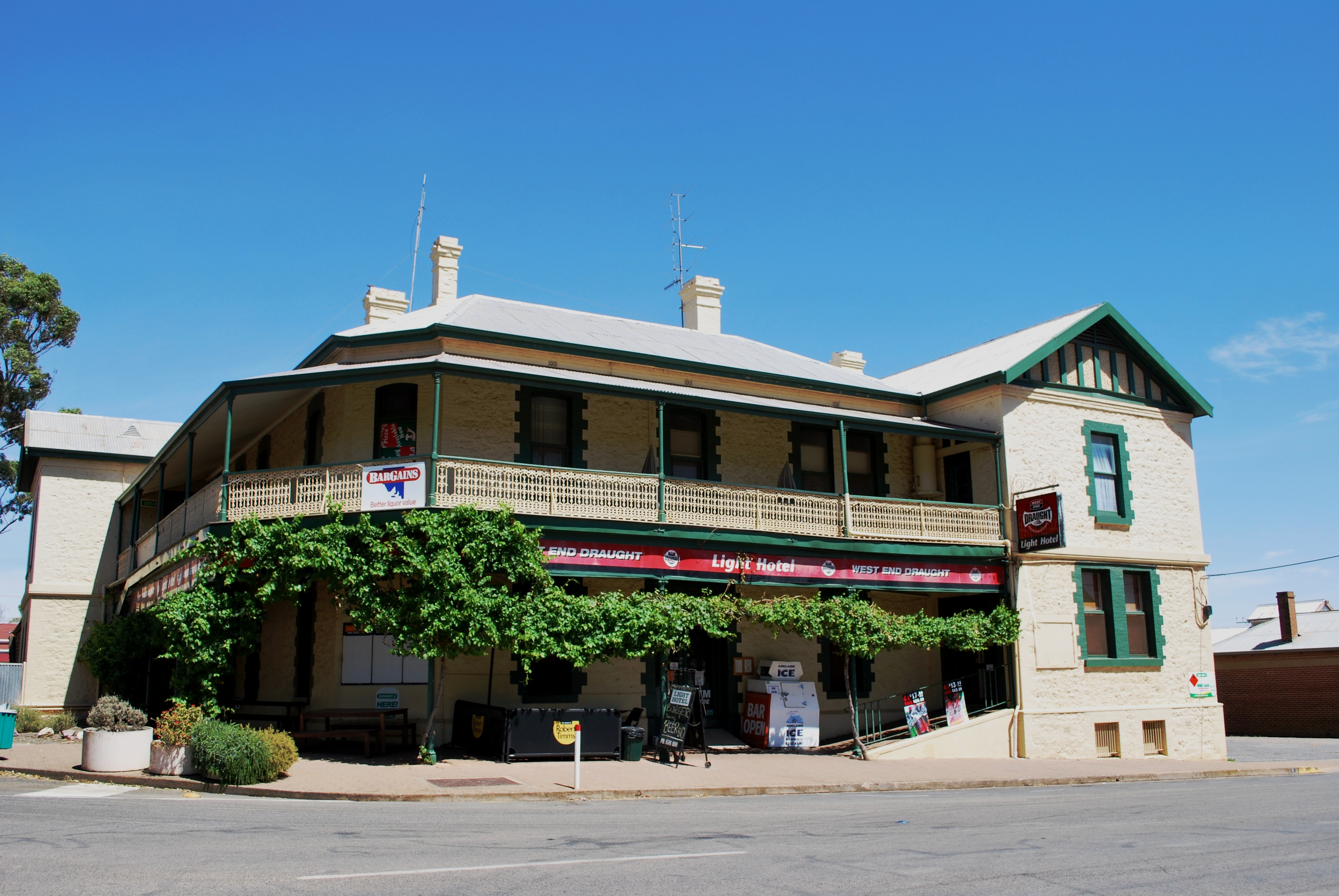
The Light Hotel, formerly the Royal Hotel

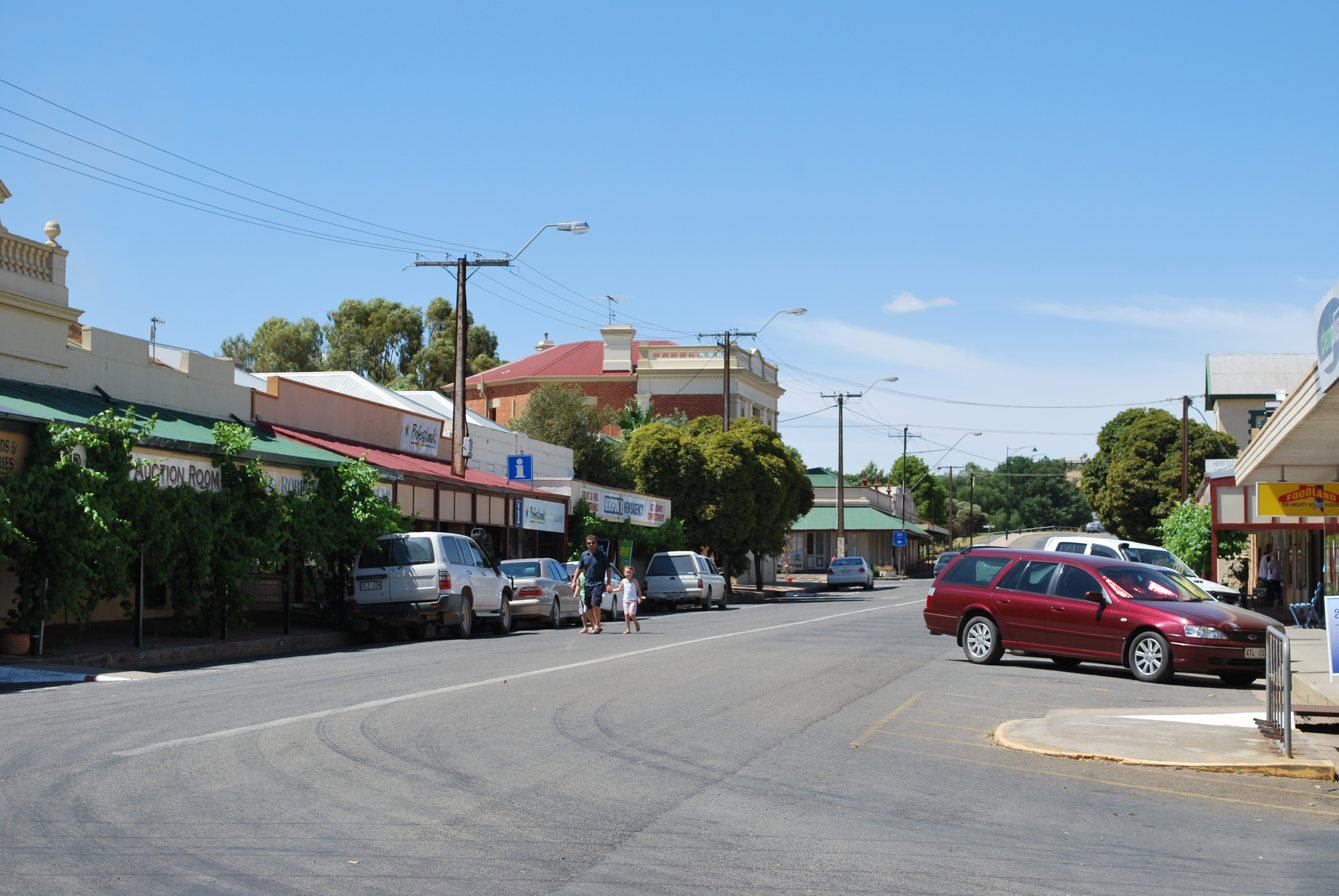
Part of Bruce Street, looking south

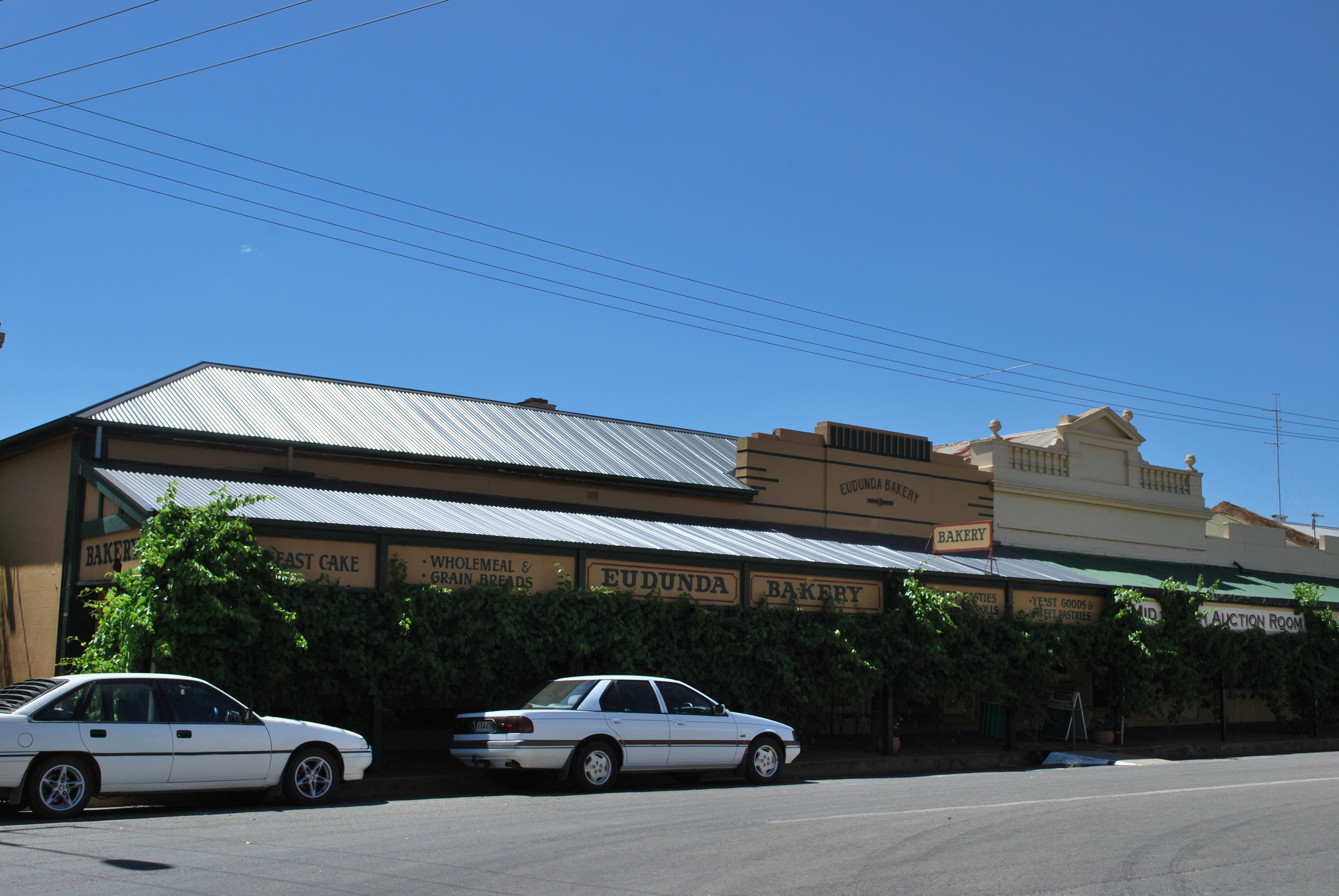
Eudunda Bakery
