= Ngapala, South Australia =

Ngapala
- Town
- Country: Australia
- State: South Australia
- LGA: Regional Council of Goyder

Government
  - State electorate: Stuart
  - Federal division: Grey

Population
  - Total: 61 (SAL 2021)
- Postcode: 5374
Localities around Ngapala
Tothill Belt	Brady Creek	Brady Creek; Robertstown
Tothill Creek	Ngapala	Robertstown
Tarnma	Julia	Point Pass

Ngapala is a rural locality in the Mid North region of South Australia, situated 125 km northeast of Adelaide in the Regional Council of Goyder. It was established in August 2000, when boundaries were formalised for the long established local name. It is divided between the cadastral Hundreds of English and Julia Creek. At the 2021 census, Ngapala had a population of 61 people.

== Etymology ==
A 1915 newspaper article describes Ngapala as a "native name." According to A Compendium of the Place Names of South Australia, the place name Ngapala is derived from the "Aboriginal word" 'ngagalja', meaning saliva. The Yandruwandha dictionary Innamincka Words defines 'ngapala' as a connecting word meaning then/and then.

== History ==
The Ngapala area is the traditional lands of the Ngadjuri people. Despite their significant historical presence, the Ngadjuri people have been frequently omitted from historical accounts of colonisation and the process by which they were dispossessed of their traditional lands.

In 1905, the government resumed some of the vast Anlaby Station freehold estate, transforming the region from large landholdings to smaller farms that enabled population growth and led to the establishment of Ngapala district in 1907.

A school opened in Ngapala in 1908 as Anlaby School. By 1913, it was renamed Ngapala School and remained operational until its closure in 1938. A postal receiving office opened in Ngapala on January 3, 1913. A post office reportedly reopened in March 1923 and operated until its permanent closure on September 30, 1967. The Ngapala Methodist Church was built in 1924 and served the community until 1984. In 1926, a telephone exchange was opened in Ngapala. Ngapala Tennis Club commenced around 1910, fell into inactivity around 1931, and was wound up around 1935. Ngapala Cricket Club operated from the 1930s until its amalgamation with the Marrabel club in 1975–76, playing in the County of Eyre Association for most of its existence.

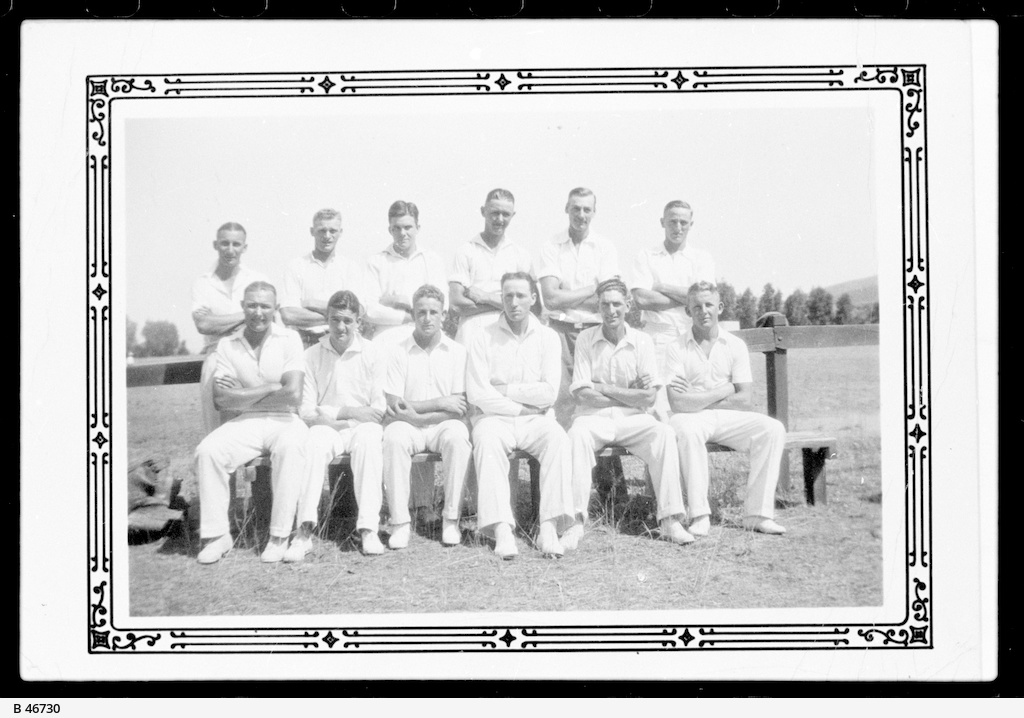
Ngapala cricket team c. 1934

A newspaper report in 1933 described Ngapala as consisting of "a Methodist church, school, and a post-office in a farm house", and stated that "mixed farming is the general occupation of this district".

== Demographics ==
According to the 2021 Census, Ngapala has a population of 61 people, with males accounting for 56.5% and females making up the remaining 43.5%. The median age of residents in Ngapala is 44. Ngapala has 20 families and 27 private dwellings, with an average of 2.7 people per household.

The median weekly household income in Ngapala is $1,625, higher than the state average. Median monthly mortgage repayments in Robertstown are $761, lower than the state average. The median weekly rent in the town is $280, also lower than the state average. Ngapala has an average of 3.7 motor vehicles per dwelling, highlighting the importance of private transportation in the area.
