= Julia, South Australia =

Julia South Australia
- Coordinates: 34.108°S 139.020°E
- Population: 21 (SAL 2021)
- Postcode(s): 5374
- Location: 111 km (69 mi) N of Adelaide; 49 km (30 mi) S of Burra; 10 km (6 mi) N of Eudunda
- LGA(s): Regional Council of Goyder
- State electorate(s): Stuart
- Federal division(s): Grey
Localities around Julia:
Tothill Creek	Ngapala	Point Pass
Tarnma	Julia	Point Pass; Eudunda
Tarnma	Hampden	Eudunda

Julia is a locality in the Mid North of South Australia, 111 kilometres North of Adelaide, the state capital. The town is located 10 kilometres (6.2 mi) north of Eudunda, in the Regional Council of Goyder. It was created in August 2000, with boundaries formalised for the long established local name.

A Lutheran congregation at Julia was formed in January 1910. It met in private homes and a wheat shed before a church was built, opening in August 1911. The church was extended in 1928.

Julia Primary School opened in 1910 and closed in 1950. Author Colin Thiele, who was raised outside Julia, attended the school from 1926 to 1932.

A post office at Julia opened in February 1881 and closed in April 1886. A postal receiving office subsequently opened in December 1908 and closed in July 1981, having been operated by a local woman out of a room of her house for 19 1/2 years.

A public hall at Julia opened in 1909, and was replaced twice, in 1926 and 1958.

Julia Football Club was established in 1911 and played in a number of competitions, including the County Eyre Association and the Mid-North Association. It went into recess from 1954 to 1956 and folded in 1960.

== See also ==
- Hundred of Julia Creek
