= Buchanan, South Australia =

Buchanan South Australia
- Coordinates: 34.185650°S 138.988650°E
- Population: 51 (SAL 2021)
- Postcode(s): 5374
- LGA(s): Regional Council of Goyder
- State electorate(s): Stuart
- Federal division(s): Grey
Localities around Buchanan:
| Tarnma | Hampden | Eudunda |
| Hamilton | Buchanan | Hansborough |
| Bagot Well | Bagot Well | Hansborough |
- Footnotes: Coordinates

Buchanan is a rural locality in the Mid North region of South Australia, situated in the Regional Council of Goyder. It was established in August 2000, when boundaries were formalised for the "long established local name".

The area was reportedly named after Alexander Buchanan, the first manager of Anlaby Station; however, there remains some uncertainty around its origin. Buchanan School opened in 1926 and closed in 1946. The school building was sold to the Buchanan Agricultural Bureau in 1965 and used as the Buchanan Hall, but was sold in 1979 due to the costs involved.

Buchanan Cricket Club was formed in 1945 and played in the County Eyre Association, playing games at Anlaby Station and later at Eudunda Oval. It won premierships in 1954–1955 and 1964–65. The club was discontinued in 1969.

The former unbounded locality of Kooninderie sits on the boundary between Buchanan and adjacent Hansborough. Kooninderie railway station on the Morgan railway line was located on the Buchanan side of the boundary.
