= Hansborough =

- Town
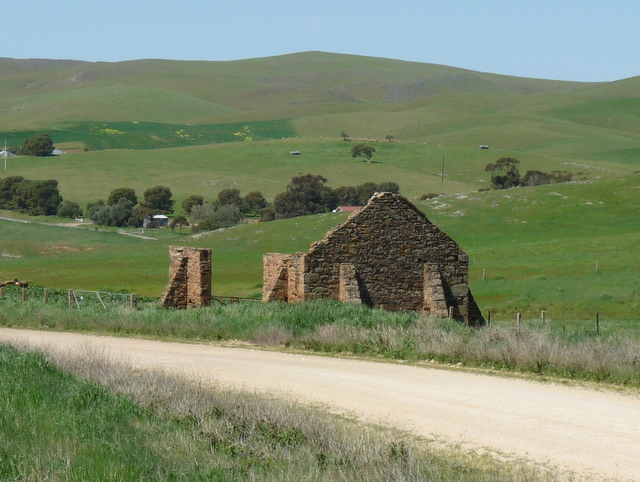
- Ruins located at Hansborough

- Coordinates: 34°15′09″S 139°00′47″E
- Country: Australia
- State: South Australia
- LGAs: Regional Council of Goyder; Light Regional Council
- Location: 100 km (62 mi) NE of Adelaide; 18 km (11 mi) NE of Kapunda; 9 km (5.6 mi) SW of Eudunda
- Established: 1865 (town); 16 March 2000 (locality)
- Abolished: 13 August 1936 (town)

Government
  - State electorate: Stuart
  - Federal divisions: Barker; Grey
- Elevation: 333 m (1,093 ft)

Population
  - Total: 47 (SAL 2021)
- Postcode: 5374
- Mean max temp: 21.1 °C (70.0 °F)
- Mean min temp: 9.3 °C (48.7 °F)
- Annual rainfall: 448.6 mm (17.66 in)
Localities around Hansborough
Buchanan	Eudunda	Eudunda
Buchanan; Bagot Well	Hansborough	Eudunda; Dutton
Bagot Well	Bagot Well; St Kitts	Dutton

Hansborough is a locality along the Thiele Highway, in South Australia's Mid North region. It is situated 9 kilometres south-west of Eudunda and 18 kilometres north-east of Kapunda. The Light River runs through the locality.

A town was surveyed in July 1865 and named after Frederick Hansborough Dutton (1812–1890), an early pastoralist and an overlander, who founded Anlaby Station, near Kapunda. It was declared as ceasing to exist on 13 August 1936. Boundaries were created for the part of the locality within the Light Regional Council on 16 March 2000 and for the part within the Regional Council of Goyder which includes the ceased Government Town of Hansborough on 24 August 2000.

The Morgan railway line opened in 1878 from Kapunda. Passenger services ceased in 1968 and the line was formally closed in 1994.

The Hundred of Neales School, later Freshwater Creek School, opened in 1927 in a former manager's residence on the Kingscourt property and closed in 1940.

== See also ==
- David Moody (politician)
