= Marrabel, South Australia =

Marrabel South Australia
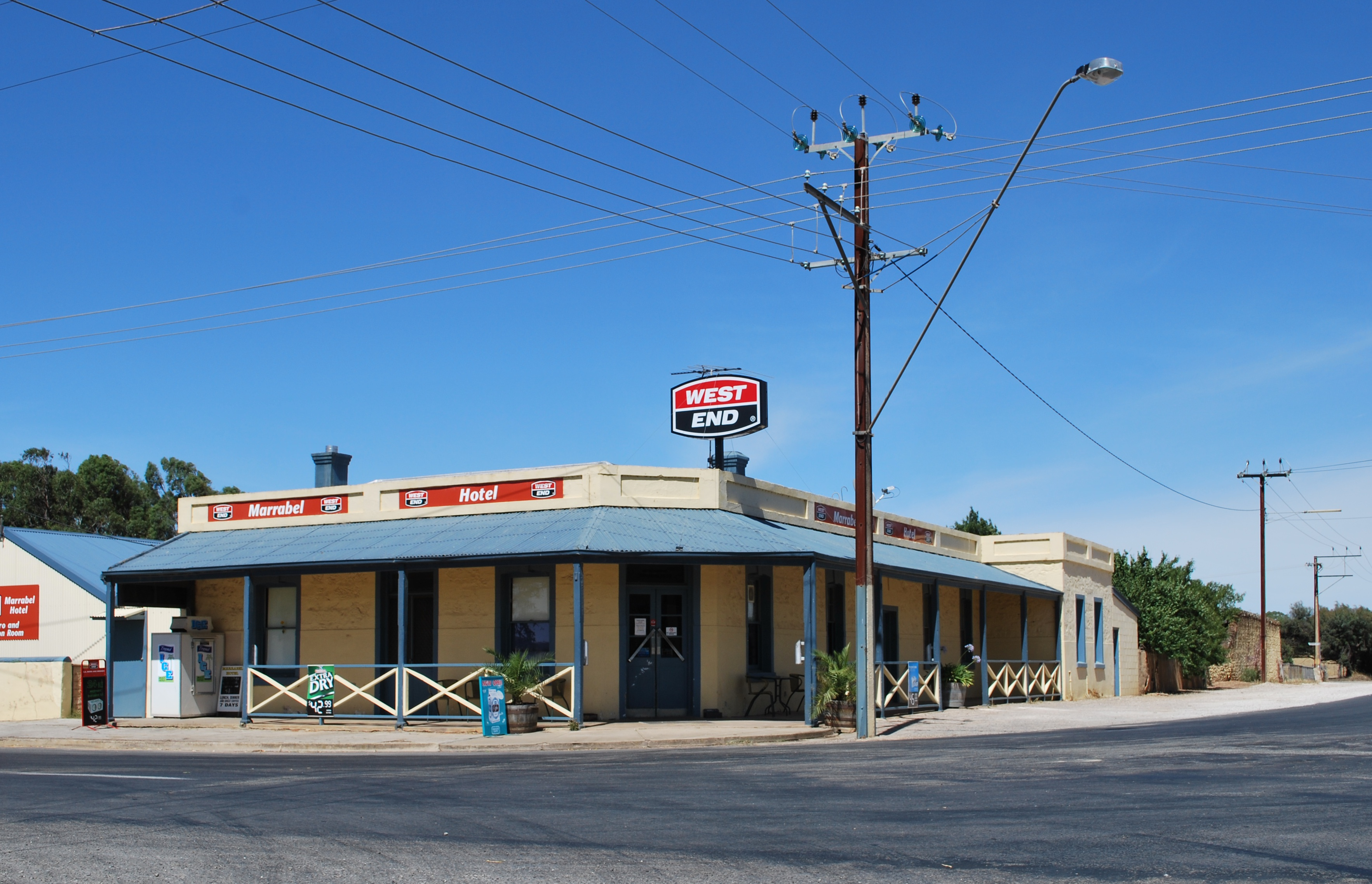
- Marrabel Hotel

- Coordinates: 34°08′37″S 138°52′36″E
- Population: 101 (SAL 2021)
- Postcode(s): 5413
- Location: 100 km (62 mi) NW of Adelaide; 24 km (15 mi) N of Kapunda; 11 km (7 mi) SE of Saddleworth
- LGA(s): Clare and Gilbert Valleys Council
- State electorate(s): Frome
- Federal division(s): Grey

Marrabel is a township and locality beside the Light River in South Australia's Mid North. It is in the Clare and Gilbert Valleys Council local government area, 100 kilometres (62 mi) north west of the state capital, Adelaide. At the 2021 census, Marrabel had a population of 101.

== Early history ==
The first European settler, in early 1841, was the livestock overlander and pastoralist William Peter, who held an Occupation Licence to establish sheep runs and shepherd huts throughout that district. His head station was just east of present Marrabel, off Tarnma Road. Nearby Peters Hill is named after him.

On 3 December 1841 the London-based Secondary Towns Association, through their Adelaide agents John Hill and John Morphett, purchased the first of several special surveys, together known as the River Light Special Survey. Surveys conducted during 1842 throughout the valley of the Upper Light resulted in a survey map which included farming lands, town lands, and five-acre lots. That survey still largely influences modern land boundaries. This speculative venture became doomed when copper was discovered at nearby Kapunda in 1842, subsequently attracting all local development. Many investors in the Special Survey lost their money.

In the late 1840s and early 1850s Marrabel was along one of the routes to the Burra copper mines used by bullock teamsters carting ore to Kapunda, becoming one of their stopovers. The fertile district soon attracted farmers, leading to several small service towns being established, including Marrabel. In 1859 a local landholder, John E. Marrabel, laid out a town on part section 1122, Hundred of Waterloo, naming it Marrabel.

The township grew rapidly and by 1865 it comprised a hotel which closed in 2019, several churches, a school, two general stores, two blacksmiths, a post office, a steam flour mill, plus many other facilities.

== Recent history ==
Although the township has since diminished in size, mainly because of improved transport, it still remains an important service centre for the district.

The handling of horses and livestock had always featured prominently in the township and district. In 1935 an annual rodeo began and has been held every October ever since, growing in popularity every year. One of the most notable Marrabel rodeo events took place in 1953, when buckjumper Alan Woods successfully rode a notoriously difficult horse named Curio. The ride became so legendary that a life size statue of horse and rider was commissioned to commemorate the event, which now stands prominently one end of the main street.

== Present Day ==
The district is an agricultural one, dominated by grain cropping, and the township still provides essential services to local farmers.

The township is today famed throughout Australia for its annual rodeo and bull ride.
