= St David's Uniting Church, Haberfield =

St David's Uniting Church
- St. David's Uniting Church; St David's Presbyterian Church Precinct; St David's Sunday School; Yasmar School; Ramsay Vault; Ramsay Graveyard
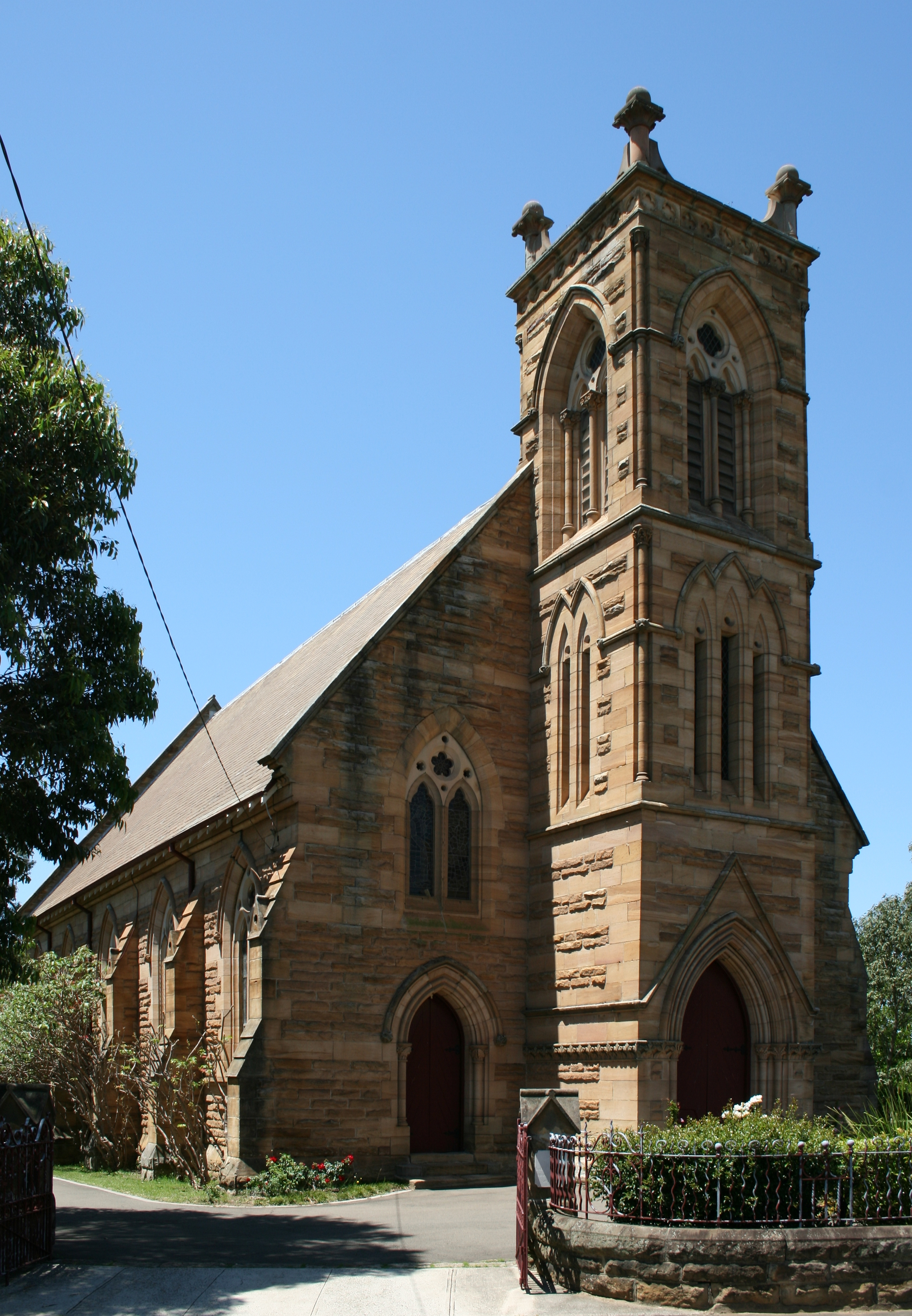
- St David's Uniting Church, Haberfield, pictured in 2009

- Location in greater metropolitan Sydney
- 33°52′57″S 151°08′16″E
- Location: 51- 53 Dalhousie Street, Haberfield, Inner West Council, Sydney, New South Wales
- Country: Australia
- Denomination: Uniting
- Previous denomination: Presbyterian
- Website: stdavids.org.au

History
- Former name: St David's Presbyterian Church
- Status: Church
- Founded: July 1861
- Founder: Dr David Ramsay
- Dedication: Saint David

Architecture
- Functional status: Active
- Architects: Simeon Lord; David Ramsay; William Munro; J. A. B. Campbell; Power, Adam, and Munning; Thomas Rowe; Ferdinand Reuss
- Architectural type: Church
- Style: Mid-Victorian Ecclesiastical Gothic
- Years built: 1860–1900

Specifications
- Materials: Hawkesbury sandstone; Slate roof

Administration
- Parish: Haberfield

New South Wales Heritage Register
- Official name: St. David's Uniting Church; St Davids Presbyterian Church Precinct; St David's Sunday School; Yasmar School; Ramsay Vault; Ramsay Graveyard
- Type: State heritage (complex / group)
- Designated: 19 August 2003
- Reference no.: 1669
- Type: Presbytery/Rectory/ Vicarage/Manse
- Category: Religion
- Builders: Williams, Ravers, Duffy, Cannon

St David's Uniting Church is a heritage-listed Uniting church and associated precinct at 51- 53 Dalhousie Street, Haberfield, Inner West Council, Sydney, New South Wales, Australia. It was designed by Simeon Lord, David Ramsay, William Munro, J. A. B. Campbell, Power, Adam, and Munning, Thomas Rowe, and Ferdinand Reuss and built from 1860 to 1900 by Williams, Ravers, Duffy and Cannon. It is also known as St. David's Uniting Church, St Davids Presbyterian Church Precinct and includes the St David's Sunday School/Yasmar School, Ramsay Vault and Ramsay Graveyard. The property is owned by the Uniting Church in Australia. It was added to the New South Wales State Heritage Register on 19 August 2003.

== History ==
St David's Church and its associated complex lie on part of the 190 hectares (470 acres) known as Sunning Hill Farm, granted in August 1803 to Nicholas Bayly. Bayly, a well-connected member of the New South Wales Corps, had a stormy career in the colony and resigned his commission six weeks after this grant was made. Sunning Hill Farm, portion 257 of Concord parish, occupied the area of present-day Haberfield, from Parramatta Road north to Iron Cove, bounded on the west by what are now Wattle Street and Dobroyd Parade, on the east by the later canal along Hawthorn Parade.

Bayly sold Sunning Hill Farm after only nineteen months, in March 1805, to the ambitious young emancipist Simeon Lord. Earlier in 1805 Lord had gone into partnership with Henry Kable (who already held what became Summer Hill) and James Underwood (who later bought Kable's land). Lord at once changed the name of Bayly's farm to Dobroyde, his preferred spelling of his Yorkshire birthplace.

Lord expanded his land holdings in the area to 600 hectares (1500 acres), with 16 hectares (40 acres) "cleared and divided into paddocks". On the property, just to the south-west of the present St David's, between the later Dalhousie Street and Orpington Street (now Rogers Avenue), Lord built a homestead, described in his advertisement for a lessee in 1816 as: an elegant villa, fit for the reception of a small genteel family, with suitable detached kitchen, dairy, stable, coach house, piggery, cow house and stockyard, together with the most productive garden, containing some of the finest trees in the Colony.

In March 1825 Simeon Lord's daughter, Sarah Ann, married a 31-year-old Scottish doctor, David Ramsay, and the bride's dowry was Dobroyde Estate. Though the settlement of the land was not formally completed until May 1826, the couple moved in to the house at once in 1825 and commenced the building of a new carriage-house, stables and cow-house in December 1825. Ramsay, a graduate in medicine from the University of Edinburgh and a native of Perth, had first visited Australia in 1820 as a ship's doctor on the "Surry" under the captaincy of Thomas Raine. In 1823 Raine and Ramsay (after taking Governor Macquarie back to Britain) settled in Sydney and from 1823 until 1828 ran in partnership a business in the heart of the city, as shipowners, agents, general merchants and woolbrokers.

The failure of the firm of Raine and Ramsay in 1828 encouraged Ramsay (who had given up medical practice) to develop his 800 hectares (2,000 acres) grazing property on the Fish River and to live more intensively at Dobroyde House. At Dobroyde he developed an important plant nursery and established a new citrus orchard between Ramsay Road and Long Cove Creek, although much of the land down to Dobroyd Point remained uncleared bush, with pockets of development.

=== The Creation of Dobroyde Estate ===
Sarah and David Ramsay had eleven children and from the 1830s onwards extended Simeon Lord's Dobroyde House to accommodate the increasing family. They were dedicated Presbyterians and philanthropists. In 1840 they set up the first Presbyterian Sunday School in the colony, using the verandah of the extended Dobroyde House. As the elder Ramsay daughters grew up, they did the bulk of the Sunday School teaching in the 1840s and 1850s

The Sunday School teaching was transferred from Dobroyde House to the nearby Yasmar in the late 1840s. In 1855 Mary Loulsa Ramsay (1826-1914), Dr Ramsay's eldest daughter, married another Scot, Alexander Learmonth (1820-1877), the senior partner in Learmonth, Dickinson and Co, stock and station agents. Soon after their marriage, the couple built their fine house, Yasmar (Ramsay backwards), on the Ramsay estate 300 metres (980 ft) north-west of Dobroyde House. Alexander Learmonth was 'an intelligent and zealous Presbyterian': he and his wife gave their time and fortune unstintingly to the church.

Dr Ramsay died in 1860. Although he "had devised liberal things for planting a Church and School" on his estate, mental illness had prevented him from going further (Steel & Cosh, Irving & Pratten) Immediately after his death, his widow, together with the Learmonths, began to realise these aspirations. Mrs Ramsay divided Dobroyde estate among her children, but laid aside 1.6 hectare (4 acres 16 perches) for burial-ground, church, school-hall and manse in the spatial proportions of 9:15:35:41. The 1.6 hectares (4.0 acres) were bounded by Dalhousie Road to the west, by Margaret Ramsay's portion to the north and east, and on the south by the 4.4 hectares (11 acres) allotted to her sister, Mrs Isabella Belisario. In 1861-2 Mrs Ramsay proceeded to build only the family vault and the school-hall.

The vault for Dr Ramsay was completed sometime before June 1862. No details are available about the architect or the builder of the vault. The finely constructed stone memorial, consisting of seven courses of sandstone blocks above ground at the rectangular dromos, the entrance with stone steps leading down westwards to a square vaulted burial chamber, largely underground but with stone walls above ground to the same roof level as the dromos. The portion of the stone roof which covers the burial chamber has at each corner a stone base surmounted by a large stone urn: these ums were recently replaced after years of neglect lying on the adjacent ground.

Dr Ramsay himself had initially been buried somewhere in the grounds of Dobroyde House in 1860. There were already two other family burials in the grounds: an unnamed child of Dr and Mrs Ramsay who died at birth in 1841 and a grandchild, Buchan Thomson, who died aged six weeks in 1858. All three bodies were transferred to the new underground vault, probably in 1861.

The expression "Vault Reserve", not cemetery, is used for the entire burial area on the earliest plan of the Presbyterian complex in c. 1867. The use of the term "vault" is broader than the actual underground burial place. Ramsay's son-in-law, Alexander Learmonth, was said by the ministers who presided at his funeral in 1877 to be buried in the vault, but he was in fact buried in the adjacent area, where a fine obelisk was erected in his memory. Similarly most members of the Belisario family were buried in their own area of their serve. Dr John Belisario, a distinguished early dentist in Sydney, married Isabella Helen Ramsay, third daughter of Dr and Mrs Ramsay, in 1854: their children, Sallie, John, Catherine, Clive and Ethel, were all buried in plot 2 between 1862 and 1947, while Isabella herself, Mrs Belisario, was also buried there in 1908. Isabella's sister, Sarah Elizabeth Ramsay and her husband Buchan Thomson are buried in plot 6, although their son, another Buchan, is in the underground vault.

There are twenty grave plots altogether, including the vault, holding 53 burials. In addition to direct members of the Ramsay and Learmonth families, Simeon Lord junior, the brother of the original Mrs Sarah Ramsay, is interred with his wife (in plot 8). The only burials of people unrelated to the Ramsays are of Mrs Annie Mackenzie, in plot 3, the wife of the first minister of St Davids, and in plot 4 Percy Pope, the infant son of the first Mayor of Ashfield and one of the trustees for the property. These non-family burials took place in 1868 and 1871 respectively and thereafter the cemetery was reserved for Ramsays by birth or marriage.

This exclusive nature of the reserve was confirmed in an agreement of 1902, declaring that the entire Vault Reserve was "a private family burial ground" with guarantees of access as on the 1860s plan.

In 1907 the Ramsay family erected a new two-metre (seven-foot) high fence around the whole Vault Reserve: palings were used on all sides except the west (towards the church) where pickets were preferred with a lockable gate. There was at the same time a "general renovation of the Burial ground". In 1910 the perimeter was trenched and the present hedge of trees planted. In recent years the cemetery has been tidied and renovated by Ramsay family initiatives.

=== The School-hall ===
After Dr Ramsay's death Mrs Ramsay and her daughter and son-in-law, the Learmonths, acted decisively to build a hall to house primarily the existing Presbyterian Sunday School. Up to a hundred children from the surrounding rural area were attending the Sunday School by 1860 and it was increasingly difficult to accommodate them at Yasmar. William Munro, a well-known Scottish builder-become-architect, was commissioned to design a suitable school-room. Munro had emigrated with his mother and siblings from northern Scotland in 1838 after the death of his father. William established himself as a carpenter and builder at Liverpool in New South Wales. In 1846 he built Holy Trinity Anglican church at Berrima to Edmund Blacket's design and in the 1850s became a more independent builder-architect. He was closely associated with St Mary's Catholic Cathedral in town from 1856 until 1861 and then embarked on a wider general practice, including other Catholic churches, in Sydney, Newcastle and the South Coast. He became much more involved in Presbyterian activities in the 1870s, when he designed St Andrew's College at the University of Sydney and St Stephen's Presbyterian Church in Phillip Street. Munro was, therefore a busy builder and designer, though closely associated with the Catholic church, when Mrs Ramsay and the Learmonths commissioned him to build the school-hall on Dobroyde estate in 1861.

In July 1861 the foundation stone of the hall was laid by Percy Ramsay, the youngest child of Dr and Mrs Ramsay. On 26 June 1862 the building was opened at a ceremony dominated by Dr John Dunmore Lang, the stormy petrel of Presbyterianism in New South Wales. A grandson of Dr and Mrs Ramsay was baptised during the ceremonies. The Empire (newspaper) newspaper described the new school-hall in enthusiastic terms as "a handsome brick building, in the plain Gothic style, with doorways, window sills and quoins of polished stone. It has four double windows and projecting buttresses on each side, with a porch in front, a high pitched roof, and a belfry, in appearance, overtopping it, the latter being intended exclusively, however, for ventilation, as the school bell is to be hung on one of the adjoining trees. The building is fifty feet by twenty-five in the clear, and is capable of accommodating not fewer than three hundred pupils".

From 1866 until St David's Church was completed in 1869 church services were held in the hall.

Less than a month after the Sunday School opened in its new premises under the name Yasmar Sabbath School and under the superintendence of Alexander Learmonth, Dr Lang asked the Board of National Education, on behalf of the Ramsays, to establish a public day school in the hall. Lang wrote: 'As there is already a Sunday school of a hundred pupils held in the school, there can be no reason to doubt that there will be a sufficient population within a reasonable distance to warrant its establishment'. The school was to be 'non-vested': this was an arrangement available since 1858 whereby the building and land remained the property of the Presbyterians but the teaching and staffing were under the control of the Board of National Education. The government agreed to Lang's proposal and Dobroyde school opened in October 1861.

There was, however, a striking difference between the hundred Presbyterian children present on Sundays and the maximum of forty-seven, mostly Anglican children who attended the day-school. The reason for the disparity is the usual fact of rural life in the nineteenth century, that children were needed to help on the land or in the homestead or in the shop. The Ashfield-Haberfield area was still in 1862 basically rural, despite the development of Ashfield village in the 1840s and the increase of services encouraged by the gold fever of the 1850s. Ashfield school on the Liverpool road had opened in 1862, nine months before Dobroyde, also as a non-vested school, meeting in the Methodist chapel. This was closer to the bulk of the population, but the premises were small and poorly maintained and in 1875 a new public school building was erected. The enrolment at Ashfield increased from 52 in 1875, the last year of the old school, to 211 in the following year. By contrast, Dobroyde's attendance declined from a peak of 42 in 1872 to 25 in 1875 and less than ten in 1876. Accordingly, Dobroyde day school was closed down in October 1876. One of the early teachers was Peter Dodds McCormick, a charismatic musician and Presbyterian enthusiast, who in 1878 published his "Advance Australia Fair", which had first been performed in 1868.

The hall at Dobroyde built by Munro in 1861-2 remained in use as a Sunday School and for other church purposes. There was another attempt to establish a public school in the building: in 1905 the minister at St David's, Dr MacInnes, offered to lease the hall to the Department of Public Instruction, just at the time that the new Director, Peter Board, was inaugurating a revitalisation of state education. The offer was declined since Ashfield, Summer Hill (opened in 1883) and Kegworth (opened in 1887) were already operating in the district.

Dr MacInnes' concern was a real one. Dobroyde estate had begun to be broken up into sub-divisions. The celebrated Federation precinct of Haberfield has its beginnings in 1901 and. 1903 with Richard Stanton's first two major land sales, on which a garden suburb was created. The "fairly extensive museum of middle-class architecture" which survives today has its origins on Stanton's development at the beginning of the 20th century.

The population density increased very rapidly as a result, leaving the estates of Yasmar, Stanton's own The Bunyas (on the site of Dobroyde House which he demolished in 1903) and the Presbyterian precinct increasingly hemmed in by suburban streets and intensive housing. Nonetheless, the school-hall did not reopen as a public school. Instead Haberfield Public School was built across Parramatta Road in 1910 and Dobroyd Point Public School in 1937.

The original Dobroyde hall continued to be used for Sunday School. Numbers increased in the 1870s and in the 1880s there were two Sunday Schools, one called Yasmar, the other St David's. These merged in 1890 and the name Yasmar was finally dropped in 1897. The Dobroyde Juvenile Association was founded in the hall in 1890 and despite the demise of this organisation in 1898 there were 'numerous and thriving young people's societies' meeting in the hall, while concerts and various social events were naturally held there.

There was wear and tear on Munro's building. It was repaired in 1898 and in 1903 a new ceiling and platform were installed: this platform was altered in 1924 A borrowing library had been installed in the hall by 1904, with 582 volumes. In 1907 the Masonic Lodge which wished to use the premises was required to put portable wooden shutters on the windows. An annexe had been built at the east end of the hall well before 1908, since its wallplate had to be replaced then because of termites,

In 1909 a new fence 17 metres (56 ft) long was installed in front of the hall and trees were planted as part of a wider improvement of the Dalhousie frontage of the church complex. In 1915 electricity was finally switched on in the hall, two years later than in the church.

The facilities provided by the Munro hall and annexe were insufficient and in 1930 the decision was taken to build new premises. Initially the specifications called for the demolition of the 1862 building. This was still the policy when the two foundation stones were laid on 28 September 1930, one by Mrs Frank McLeod, a parishioner for over forty years, the other by the minister, John Gray, in honour of the reticent Ramsays. By January 1931 a new plan had been proposed by J. A. B. Campbell which incorporated the walls of the 1862 hall. This plan was passed on to the architects Power, Adam, and Munning, who were impressed and modified their own plans, so that the now familiar rectangular sections were added at right angles to the front and back of the 1862 building. The local contractor R. C. Williams completed these additions later in 1931.

=== St David's Church ===
The primary intention of the Ramsay and Learmonth families had been to erect a worthy church for Presbyterian worship. In 1865 the reunion of most of the separated sections of the Presbyterian Church after two decades of post-Disruption schism made a propitious time. There were nineteen churches in the new united Presbytery of Sydney in 1865, nine of them in Sydney proper, but none in the westward expansion of the suburban area. Alexander Learmonth, like the Ramsays and Goodlets, had been obliged to worship in central Sydney. Learmonth in particular felt very strongly about the virtues of reunification and in 1865 withdrew his support from his Sydney church because it failed to join the new united Synod of Australia. The influence of Learmonth and his wife, together with her mother, the widowed Mrs Ramsay, was critical. When on 25 July 1866 "a Committee to manage the temporal affairs of the Congregation" at Dobroyde was chosen in the school-hall, the first member to be nominated and elected was Alexander Learmonth, "whose great fitness for the duty was known to them all".

The election of the committee followed the first service held in the school-hall in May 1866, under Dr John Dunmore Lang. As the first minute-book of the Committee of Management eloquently proclaims, several of the friends of the Presbyterian Church of New South Wales, residing in and about the district of Ashfield, feeling that from their distance from Sydney, their families were not fully enjoying the ordinances of religion, and that a daily increasing population was gathering in the neighbourhood, resolved to apply to the Presbytery [of Sydney] for supplies of ordinances; and the school house at Dobroyd having been kindly placed at their disposal for the purpose of holding Sabbath day services, the presbytery entertained the application and the Ministers of the presbytery preached in the school house for eleven Sabbaths in rotation.

The intention from the outset had been to erect the church between the Vault Reserve and Dalhousle Street, immediately to the north of the school-hall. In the site-plan prepared by Ferdinand Reuss around 1867 the proposed church occupied very much the position and general layout, though not the exact proportions of the church built in 1868 - 69.

Eight trustees were appointed for the new church, including Mrs Ramsay and Learmonth; the Ramsay family started a building fund with a gift of A£1,000; Thomas Rowe was commissioned to design the church, Frederick Lavers to construct it; and on 28 April 1868 the foundation stone was laid by Mrs Ramsay in lieu of the Duke of Edinburgh, Prince Alfred, who was indisposed following the famous assassination attempt. The gold-mounted mallet (made from native forest oak felled on the site) and the gold trowel in a rosewood casket were to be sent to the Duke in Britain.

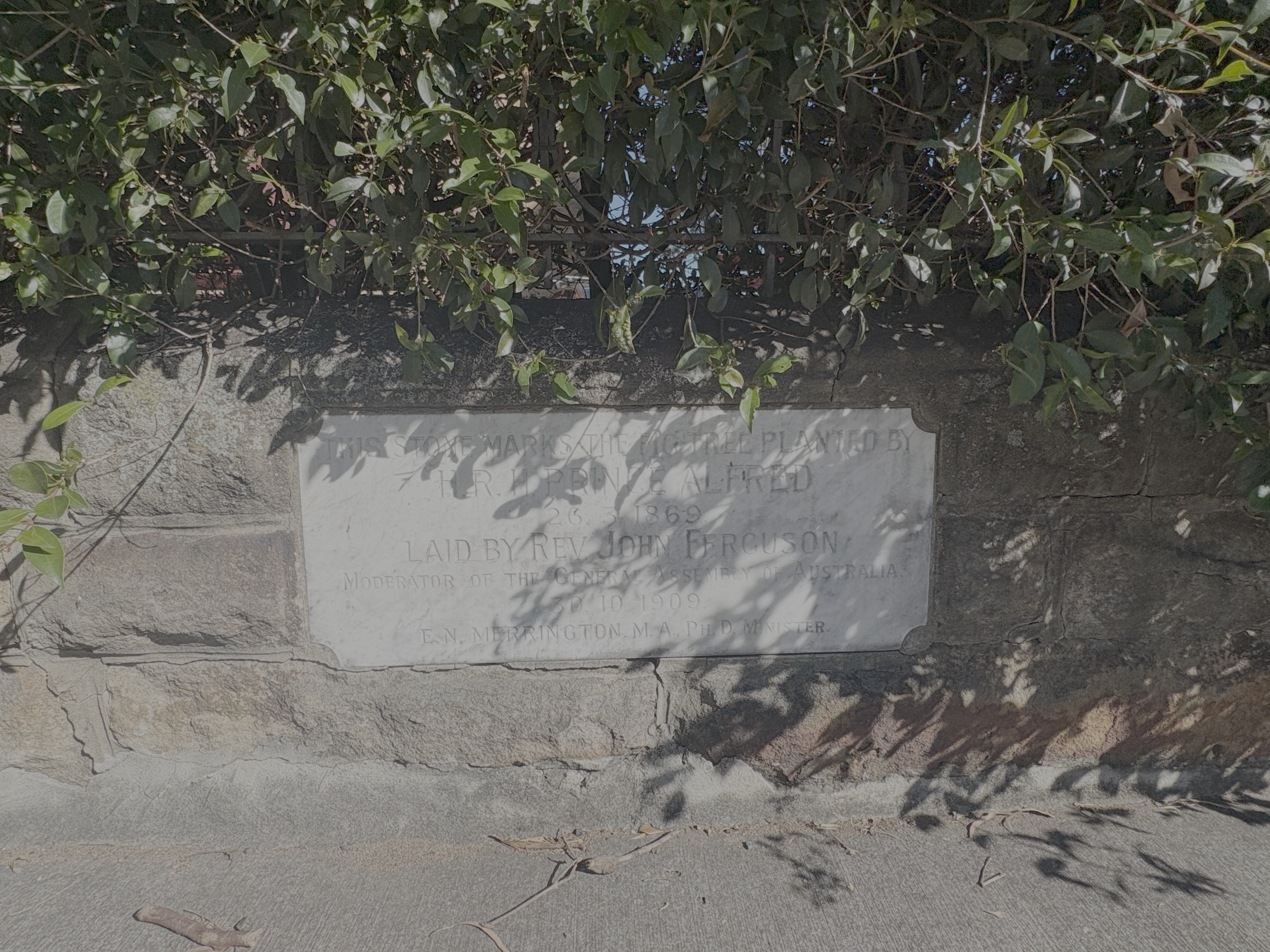
Plaque commemorating a fig tree planted by Prince Alfred upon the church opening in 1869

Eleven months later, on 26 March 1869, Good Friday, St David's Presbyterian Church opened for worship. This time the Duke of Edinburgh was in attendance and he planted a Moreton Bay figtree to the south-west of the church porch, where it flourished until it went the way of the forest oak in 1921.

The church was described in 1892 (and it had not changed materially since 1869) as:

"... one of the prettiest of our suburban churches, it is hidden by trees on one side, and shut in by the public school on the other ... The only objection which seems to be against the architecture is that the tower is too small in proportion to the rest of the building. This tower is topped by a graceful spire, which, if it were of stone, would harmonise well with the other work: but as it seemed to me to be made of wood, and is painted black, is not quite so picturesque in reality as it looks upon paper".

— Town and Country Journal, 1892.

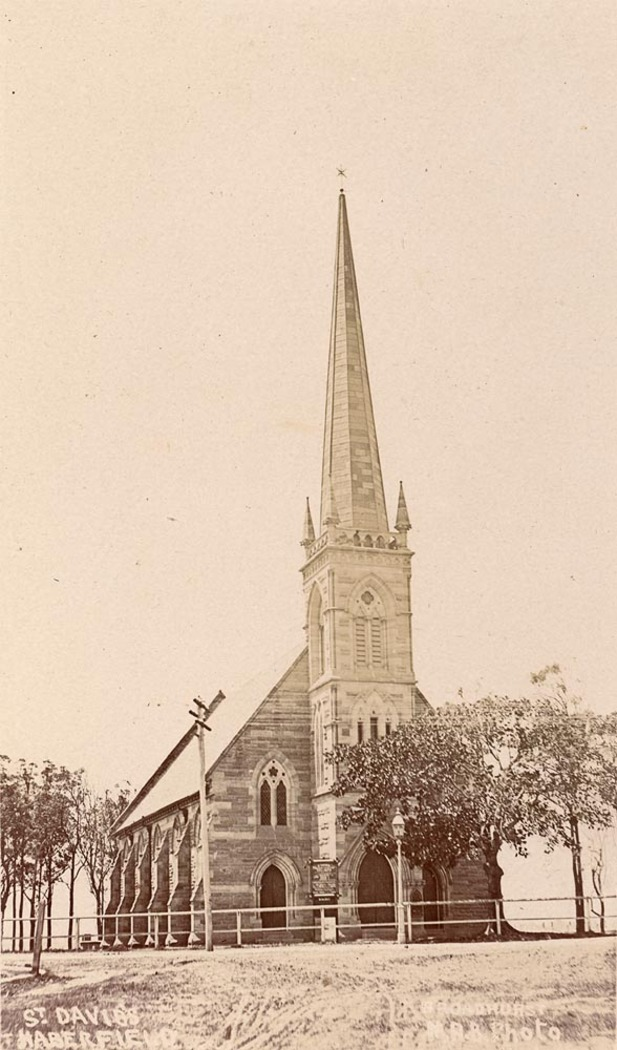
St David's with its spire

The Town and Country Journal correspondent was mistaken about the material used for the spire. It was in fact 'hollow and made of metal sheets supported by a stiff iron rod running down the centre into the ... tower'. The argument of Belinda Cohen that there was first a wooden spire and then a metal one is based on a misreading of the 1892 article. The spire (demolished in 1915) was surmounted by a weathervane and the four top corners of the tower were decorated with stone obelisks on pillars with stone palisading on each side of the tower.

When it opened in 1869 St David's was the only Presbyterian presence in the area. Ashfield was growing and was declared a municipality in 1871, with subsequent improvements in transport and an increasing tempo of sub-division. Just as the residents of Ashfield south of Parramatta Road had sought their own school in 1862, so in 1875 the Presbyterian residents of Ashfield petitioned the Presbytery of Sydney for a church of their own. As the petitioners said, 'there were few houses around St David's, whereas the village of Ashfield had a number of residences and it was a long walk from Ashfield to Dobroyde'. As a result, in 1876 a new church on the Liverpool road was inaugurated (also by Dunmore Lang). It is usually known as the Liverpool Street church. Its founding minister was John Auld who had answered the call to St David's only in 1874. Auld brought to the new church twenty-six of the St David's communicants, including one of the elders.

These new arrangements for Presbyterian worship in the Ashfield area were amicably introduced and St David's recovered its numbers as population increased. Both Liverpool Street and St David's were fortunate in having outstanding and long-lived ministers in the last quarter of the nineteenth century. Auld continued at Liverpool Street until 1906 and at St David's the distinguished theologian Dr MacInnes was minister from 1880 until his death in 1908.

MacInnes was Moderator in 1894 and for many years Convener of the Assembly's Church Property Law and Documents Committee. He was well known for 'his watchfulness and diligence in securing valid title deeds for much of [the church's] property' (White, 1951). It was fortunate that MacInnes was at the helm to steer his own church of St David's through the reefs surrounding the title to its land. These problems were resolved eventually only on appeal to the Privy Council in Britain, "which laid down the principle that land donated to a church could not subsequently be sold by the donor".

Under MacInnes some significant changes were also made to the church fittings at St David's. The flooring was completely removed in 1895, the area below the floor-boards was cleaned and coated with asphalt and a new floor was laid in both church and vestry. At the same time the internal walls of the church were cleaned and coloured with wash.

The church roof required new woodwork and replacement of slates in 1907, while in the following year an asphalt path 1.8 metre (6 feet) wide from the porch to Dalhousie Street was laid by P. Duffy and the original small entry gates were taken elsewhere and new gates erected by a Lewisham contractor, E. Cannon.

There was much activity from 1909 until 1911 under MacInnes' successors, Dr Merrington (1908-1910) and Angus King (1910-1923). In 1909 Excelsior ventilators were inserted in the roof under the supervision of the architect W. A. Rostron and the lead ridge-capping was replaced. In the same year, a new front fence was erected (described in section 2.6 below). The church bell which had hitherto hung outside on a pole was now in December 1909 put up the tower under the supervision of A.M. Allen, the architect commissioned to build the manse in 1910–11.

Meanwhile, the sub-division of the original Ramsay gift to the church of 1.6 hectare (4 acres) was proceeding. St David's Road, which had been created in a sub-division of 1885 from Parramatta Road to the southern boundary of the Presbyterian precinct, was now extended to the north across the precinct. St David's Road now ran to the east of the Vault Reserve, cutting across the L-shaped Manse Reserve (reducing it to a rectangle) and joining the existing Kingston Street on the north side of the church land. This part of Kingston Street was then renamed St David's Road and Kingston Street now beams only north-east of Ramsay Street. Eight allotments were created by this sub-division and the proceeds from their eventual sale were earmarked for building the manse.

In March 1913 the tower was struck by lightning. As a result, it was necessary to remove the original palisading and the corner obelisks at the top of the tower and base of the spire. The present stone arrangement was substituted.

Although the spire was damaged to the extent that it became "crooked and bent", it was not removed until 1915 when the architects Power and Adam supervised its demolition. The church then assumed its present external appearance.

In 1914 electricity had been laid on to the church (and to the school-hall in 1915, the manse in 1924) Music in the church had hitherto been supplied by a reed organ: the school-hall also had a second reed organ and a piano. The advent of electric power to the church made a pipe organ highly desirable and in 1917 the first moves were made to erect a suitable instrument as a memorial to those of the parish who had fallen in World War I. (One of the reed organs was presented to the Marulan Mission at this time. An agreement with the Adelaide organ-builder J. E. Dodd was reached in 1917 and a two-manual organ was duly installed in 1920 (UCA, Box 6, Pipe Organ accounts).

Josiah Eustace Dodd (1856-1952) was Victorian born but had been an independent organbuilder in Adelaide since 1894. Dodd was a successful competitor to the well-established organ firms of Sydney and Melbourne: by 1906 he had constructed 47 new organs for South Australia and Western Australia and between 1909 and 1930 built eleven new organs in New South Wales churches. The St David's organ was the sixth Dodd organ in the state, following on Lithgow St Mary's. Lismore St Carthage, Walla Zion, Killara St Martin's and Murrumburrah Ross Memorial The handsome case was supplied by Dodds also. The contract specified that the "front pipes shall be silvered, the lips gilded and outlined With a band of colour. The pipes may be otherwise decorated by arrangement." The 415-volt electric motor from Lever Bros' Sunlight Soap Works and Oil Mills was installed in a vault below the vestry, 150 by 125 em. (5' by 4W) and 150 em high at the lowest point. This arrangement made the motor too audible in the church, however, and in 1923 the motor was moved outside. In 1926 this motor and the blower were entirely replaced by a Weston Patent Blower.

The next major changes in the interior of the church came in 1959 when the architect Finlay Munro drew up plans to make substantial alterations in levels to the elders' dais at the east end of the church. New choir stalls were also introduced in 1959 in the north aisle of the church by the massaging of existing pews.

The organ itself was originally placed in the chancel at the east end of the church, between tile doors leading to the vestry. As part of changes to the chancel planned by Dr Cumming Thorn in 1964, it was moved to the opposite end of the church by the Melbourne organ builders, George Fineharn and Sons Pty Ltd. The Session Clerk, Bill Buchanan, organised the building of suitable footings for the organ above the west porch. The names of seventy-seven men who had served in World War I had been inscribed on panels of the organ case: since these were no longer accessible in the new location, Buchanan made an entirely new honour board which was installed in the west porch and dedicated in 1969 as part of the second stage of the centenary celebrations. In 1947 a World War II honour board had been unveiled by the governor in the west porch: after the 1969 celebrations this World War II memorial was relocated in the church under the resited organ.

To ensure ongoing maintenance for the entire complex the St David's Foundation and Memorial Fund was set up in 1974. Its first act was to establish a Memorial Book in 1974, displayed in a cabinet sitting on part of the former pulpit of Haberfield Methodist Church. The cabinet was designed and constructed by a former elder of St David's, Robert Lang, as a memorial to Alfred and Amelia Hedger, while the pulpit was modified by W. R. Buchanan.

No fewer than eight modem stained glass windows have been donated as memorials to individuals between 1946 and 1998, both before and after the decision by the Presbyterian congregation to Join the Uniting Church.

=== The Manse ===
There was no manse at St David's for the first 42 years of the church's existence. Ministers lived in their own houses in the vicinity. In September 1910 a contract was made with the architect A. M. Allen to design a manse with four bedrooms, drawing room, dining room, study and usual offices. The building contractor was Bowle. Originally foundations were to be of concrete but this specification was altered early in 1911 to brick and concrete, while the design was modified to allow entry to the "library" (presumably the "study" of the original contract) from the back verandah.

The foundation stone was to be laid on 22 April 1911 by Sir James Burns, of Burns Philp, who had founded the Burnside Homes in the previous year (68), but in the event Mrs Goodlet performed the ceremony. Elizabeth Mary Forbes (1865-1926) was the second wife of Colonel John Hay Goodlet, head of a great building materials firm and a major Presbyterian benefactor, who lived at Canterbury House in South Ashfield. Goodlet was an elder of the Liverpool Street church in Ashfield, where, like Learmonth at St David's, he was for many years superintendent of the Sunday School. Neither John nor Elizabeth is recorded as a donor to St David's but they were extremely active in all manner of Presbyterian causes. Elizabeth was particularly dedicated to foreign missions.

Further changes in design were made after the foundation stone of the manse was laid. The original laundry became an additional bedroom for the family of the Revd Angus King, a new brick laundry was created and the picture rails were omitted from the kitchen. The south-west side of the house was to be tuck-pointed at extra cost in August 1911. Venetian blinds from Nock and Kirby were supplied.

The manse is illustrated in Trevor Howells' magisterial study of Federation architecture in the state. Howells comments that: though the detailing of the stuccoed chimneys, slate roof and floor plan are typically Italianate, the use and decorative treatment of materials for the walls and roof massing are distinctly Federation in style, while it takes the expression of its identity in its stride. Religion is suggested merely by giving the sitting room window a low, pointed-arched head, with a plaster label mould above, and punching three trefolled openings in the valance under the porch roof (Howells & Nicholson).

The undeveloped land around the new manse was laid out as a garden by Mr Whealey and the actual creation of the garden in 1912 was the responsibility of Mr Parnwell (Howells & Nicholson).

The manse continue to be lit and heated by gas until November 1924 when electricity, already connected to the church and school-hall, was installed (Howells & Nicholson).

In 1930 the Women's Guild raised money to renovate the manse. Riggs, a painting and decorating firm from Homebush, renovated the interior and painted the exterior. There were also extensive repairs in 1940 and 1951 but the details are not recorded.

=== The Grounds ===
Originally the grounds were heavily wooded. Still in 1892 'the tall trees in the background [showed] up the church in strong relief'. The earliest fencing along the Dalhousie Street frontage was simply a one-rail wooden fence, shown in a sketch in 1892. By 1905 this had been replaced by a two-rail wooden fence in front of the church and school hall, but continuing to the south with a fence of vertical slabs between two horizontals.

In 1909 the wooden fencing along the church frontage was replaced with a more handsome stone wall, 60 centimetres (24 in) high, surmounted by cast-iron railings 75 centimetres (30 in) high. The new entrance, curving in from the street alignment, had stone pillars on both sides, designed by A. M. Allen who was to be the architect for the manse in 1910–11. The north gate-post was inaugurated with a stone inscription unveiled by the Mayor of Ashfield, Herbert Pratten, the other by a member of the Ramsay family.

The asphalt path from the church porch to the street was first laid in 1908 and a wider area of asphalt there in 1910. At the same time in 1910 the first tennis court was laid out immediately behind the school-hall, parallel to the southern boundary. St David's Tennis Club was formed in 1910 'to provide recreation for Younger People and others of St David's Church', but membership was open to non-adherents. A second tennis court was built in 1913 to the east of the first court but at right angles to it and hard against the southern boundary, opposite the Vault Reserve.

In 1930 the extensions to the school-hall, discussed in section 3 above, removed part of the westerly tennis court, so only the lower court was thereafter available. The surface of the upper court was transferred to the lower and dug in over four days in May 1930. Although in c. 1946 the Youth Community Council, a coordinating body with particular interest in sport and leisure activities in the church grounds, planned the "eventual laying down of another tennis court" as well as the establishment of a basketball ground, neither of these projects seems to have been achieved and in due course the sole tennis court closed.

== Description ==
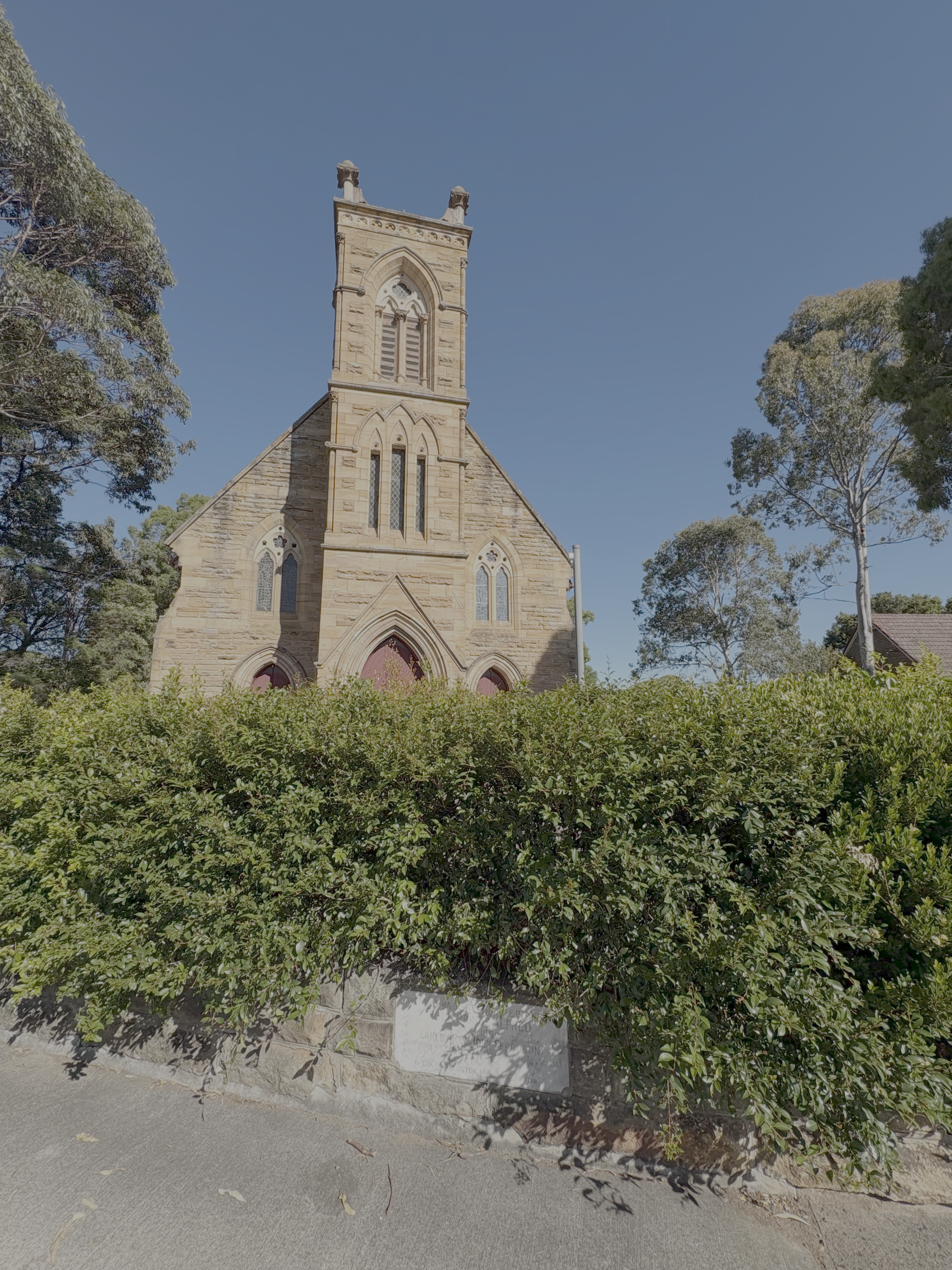
Viewed from the street, with commemorative plaque visible

=== Site ===
The site comprises a generally rectangular block with frontages to Dalhousie Street (to the west) and St David's Road (to the east) sited atop the low rise between the major thoroughfares of Parramatta Road (to the south) and Ramsay Street (to the north). Although only half of the original size remains from the 1860s, the site retains all its significant components - including church, hall, manse and Vault Reserve. In the midst of a densely developed suburban area, the grounds are surprisingly spacious - both visually and physically. The informally landscaped grounds and scattered tall trees contribute both to the settings of individual site elements and to the Dalhousie and St David's Road streetscapes - as well as providing an important visual and physical legacy of the early, picturesque, semi-rural character of the site.

Site landscaping is generally characterised by generous areas of open lawn, a variety of tree plantings and gardens and shrub plantings (generally associated with specific buildings such as the Manse) or elements such as the front fence.

There are a number of visually important tall trees on the site associated with the Manse and the churchyard. Several of the large camphor laurels on the site are located adjacent to the Vault Reserve and have been found to cause problems here. A row of she oaks marks the eastern i.e. St David's Road boundary of the churchyard. The trees around the Manse are a mix of species, ages and condition and include jacarandas, evergreens, palms and various native plantings.

The front and side views of the hall reveal relatively little substantial planting other than a lone (quite large) pencil-pine/Mediterranean cypress (Cupressus sempervirens) beside the front gate (possibly one of a pair planted not long after the gate's installation) and some relatively young native tree saplings (and seedlings) to the north of the building. More substantial plantings are, however, located to the rear of the hall and adjacent to the area of the old tennis court. This area is now simply an area of open lawn but its original function can still be read in its landscape character in views to the south-east through the site.

The cement paved driveway/forecourt in front of the church is lined along its western edge by a variety of tall shrubs which spill through (and largely obscure) the front fence. Recent plantings of natives such as grevillea feature closer to the entrance porch.

The main driveway and turning area in front of the church is finished with concrete paving which extends to the base of the (west front) of the church. The major pathways along the sides of the church and hall are also concrete paved. To the north of the church, along the northern boundary shared with the manse is an informally defined, lightly gravelled parking area for church visitors.

A small, plain wall of red texture-brick on which is mounted the base of a cast-cement drinking fountain is sited to the south of the main entrance to the church. A small plaque indicates the structure was erected in the 1950s as a memorial to a church officer Steve Stretton.

The Dalhousie Street frontage features a pair of fine early 20th century fences designed by A. M. Allen. The 1909 fence in front of the church and hall features a base of rock-faced, coursed stone supporting a wrought iron balustrade with a variety of curlicue ornamentation reflecting early 20th century Arts & Crafts influences. Two vehicular-width gateways provide access to the hard-paved area in front of the church and feature dressed sandstone gateposts with intersecting gabled tops and stop-chamfered corners. A pedestrian gate with ornamental tendrils, curls and spears mounted between a pair of similar gate-posts is located opposite the main Hall entrance.

The fence as a whole is generally in quite good condition but showing evidence of the general weathering and wear and tear common with such structures of this age (including open joints, various impacts from the laying of paved surfaces against the base, etc). More significant however, was the condition of the gate posts either side of the two vehicular entrances which showed evidence of repeated and substantial impact damage and resultant movement - resulting in one post having to be dismantled and the body and jointing of the others appearing less than satisfactory. Some movement in associated sections of tied in wall was also noted.

In front of the Manse the fence (dating to c.1911) has a brick base matching the brickwork of the residence (with red-brown body and purple brown bull-nosed coping). The wrought iron railing employs some of the elements of the church fence in a more open manner, providing a related but subtly different decorative treatment. The two iron pedestrian gates are supported on decorative cast iron posts which feature an eclectic mix of decorative elements.

Elsewhere on the site the fences are more recent and include the timber paling fences along the north, south and east boundaries of the site and between the manse and churchyard and the various modern steel fences along the west of the churchyard and behind the hall. The boundary between the Manse and church is lined with a light framed timber post and wire infill.

=== Vault Reserve ===
The separately fenced Vault Reserve is located generally in the centre of the site to the east of the church and has a substantial frontage to St David's Road. Timber paling fences line the north (manse), south and east (road) boundaries and a modern wire-mesh fence the remaining west boundary providing some visual connection with the church precinct. All the fences to the churchyard and adjacent Manse appear to be of relatively modern vintage and apparently close to original alignments.

The Vault Reserve provides the earliest evidence of the site's use and associations with the Ramsay family - this being the area first developed and still retaining its oldest and most significant feature, the Ramsay family vault. The Reserve comprises a sizable, roughly rectangular area to the east (and slightly below the level) of the church with a street frontage to St David's Road. The somewhat unusual "scalloped" northwest and south-west corners of the fenced-in area appear in the configuration of the site from the earliest available plans, though how exactly the modern wire-mesh and paling fences of the present boundaries follow the original alignments may well need to be verified by survey. The character of the Reserve as a whole is generally quite informal and picturesque despite the burial plots being laid out in a relatively regular manner (aligned east–west) across the width of the site.

The large number of trees - most notably some sizeable camphor laurels - the privacy provided by planting to St David's Road and the somewhat untamed character of the landscaping generally all clearly contributing to the special character of the area. The Reserve contains twenty grave plots altogether, including the vault, holding 53 burials. The Ramsay vault itself is structure of particular quality and architectural merit built of ashlar stonework of seven courses above ground level at the rectangular dromos, the entrance at the east side leading via stone steps into a square vaulted chamber which is largely underground and lined with shelves for coffins. The stone roof over the vault features a carved stone urn at each corner (recently restored and partially reconstructed).

Various issues relating to the physical condition of the area and its monuments were noted during site inspections and/or were raised as matters of concern by the minister and church members, Items of particular concern include continuing problems with ground water accumulation within and around the Ramsay vault, the lifting of memorials by tree roots, the suckering of trees and their growth within (and too closely around) grave plots, the general maintenance needs of both memorials and landscaping (lawns, tree plantings, etc.) and vandalism. The generally poor visual quality of the surrounding fencing was also noted.

=== Built elements ===
The three major buildings on the site, namely the church, hall, and manse all front Dalhousie Street with the church aligned on a strict east–west access in contrast to the flanking manse and hall which follow the convention of the surrounding streetscape in squarely facing the road frontage. The buildings are generally equally spaced apart with quite generous areas of open space between. Open lawns and sapling trees separate the hall from the church while the manse is separated from the church by an informal parking area and modern wire fence. An open concrete paved driveway/forecourt largely fills the area between the front of the church and Dalhousie Street.

==== Church ====
Thomas Rowe's 1868 sandstone church remains the dominant element in both general and immediate views of the site. Aligned along an east–west axis (and thus somewhat angled to the street frontage) the building is a symmetrically laid out and simply detailed example of mid Victorian "Ecclesiastical Gothic" church architecture. In formal terms the church comprises a simple rectangular nave with wide, steeply sloping slate roof terminating at the west end at a central, square tower originally (but no longer) surmounted by a thin metal clad steeple. At the east end is a lower gable-roofed vestry. Tied buttresses along the north and south walls and gothic arched heads to the main entrance porch, other external doors and the traceried windows generally conform to the details typical of the period, style and building type.

The external walls are of a warm gold sandstone (probably a Sydney stone) laid in narrow courses of rock-faced stone with dressed stone for corner quoins, window and door surrounds, mouldings and string-courses. The western tower, a compact structure with a shallow arch over the central doorway and stone traceried windows at clerestory and bell-tower level, terminates with a modest projecting string course surmounted by the squat circular finials with ball-mouldings installed in 1913 to replace the original corner spear finials and balustrade. The original diagonally boarded entry doors in the west elevation of the tower are flanked by pilasters with decorative heads and a frieze of carved foliage. The flanking doors in the west wall of the church, though featuring similar arched heads and tied pilasters, have simple hood mouldings instead of the elaborate frieze. Each of these doors is accessed by two to three stone steps - the central door having been fitted with quite discrete modern steel handrails and the north door having a removable timber ramp with attached handrail to facilitate disabled access.

The bays of the north and south walls of the nave are punctuated by pairs of lead-light, stained glass windows set in gothic stone tracery with variety given by the changes in the detailing of the quatrefoil in the spandrel above the main lights. The rear vestry wing has smaller pairs of gothic arch-headed windows without tracery, buttressed corners and a stone finial surmounting the apex of the stone coping on the end gable.

While generally in reasonable condition, the external stonework of the church, like the front fence, shows sufficient evidence of both general weathering and specific problems to warrant attention. Chief among these concerns is the evidence of rising damp and salt attack in stonework around the base of the building and particularly at the west end, most notably in and around the porch area. Associated with this is evidence of stone decay and loss of joints. On the tower there is also evidence of quite significant stone weathering and loss of joints, with mouldings around the top of the structure being affected.

The main spaces include the entrance porch under the west tower, a small foyer which leads into the main body (nave) of the church and the Vestry at the east end accessed via a pair of doors off the raised dais at the east end of the nave. The simple interior of the church is typical of the layout and character of Protestant churches of its period and style and retains much that is important of the original character and fabric. The main space features the traditional exposed timber truss roof framing typical of the style and period, dark stained and supporting a timber boarded lining (beneath the external slates). Decorative braces featuring cut-out foils are supported on carved stone corbels where each truss meets the side walls. Additional metal tie rods link the horizontal hammer-beams.

The walls generally are of plain rendered masonry with a painted finish with face stone used for window and door surrounds, the latter featuring carved mouldings to the gothic-arched heads supported on tied pilasters. The east end of the church features a symmetrical layout of three such doorways, the two smaller openings on either side fitted with timber doors and fixed boarded "fanlights" and the larger central arch filled in with modern sawn stone facing (c. 1970s-80s) as the backdrop to the central timber cross.

The internal layout is generally similar to the original with paired aisles between the rows of early carved timber pews facing the raised dais, carved communion table and pulpit. The present configuration of the raised front dais and northern choir stalls, however, largely dates to 1959 (with some more recent alterations) when architect Finlay Munro prepared plans which provided for the extension of the area around the communion table dais to the north and south walls, the relocation of the choir facilities from the north-east corner, the cutting back of steps into the vestry and the installation of new steps up to the main "elders dais". Further changes were made in the 1970s-80s with the removal of the original Dodds organ to the west end of the church and the infilling of the central arch with sawn stone above a relocated timber panelled dado. The layout of the choir stall against the north wall also generally dates from 1959 though much of its fabric was reused original material (including carved panelling, etc.). Recent removal of the pews and installation of a removable floor over the stepped structure below allows the use of this area for more modern music making. At the west end of the church the north corner has been partially enclosed with sections of relocated carved timber railing (possibly a communion rail) around the display cabinet (sitting on part of the former pulpit of Haberfield Methodist Church) holding the church's Memorial Book installed in 1974. The original Dodd's organ has also been relocated to this end of the church since the 1970s. Stained glass windows feature on the north and south walls.

The various fittings and fixtures on the internal walls include significant early memorials (such as the Roll of Honour from the first world war) and early fittings such as the hymn board. As well, there are traditional flags, contemporary banners and a range of modern and somewhat less at home elements such as a projection screen, cameras, fire-hydrant and associated cabling.

The vestry is a simply detailed room with a timber boarded ceiling, plastered walls with stone dressings to windows and doors and a boarded timber floor. Much of the fabric and general character of the room appears to be original.

==== Hall ====
The T-shaped layout of the hall provides a remarkably clear account of its original form and character as well as the significant 1930s alterations and extensions. The main auditorium of the hall is a substantial remnant of Munro's original 1861-62 structure, its exposed north and south walls retaining the 5 buttresses and 4 pairs of windows of the original. The brickwork of these walls bears evidence of the original pale lime-wash finish which appears in early photographs together with areas of more modern paintwork and areas washed clean of earlier finishes. The original stone surrounds to the windows have generally been painted though this too has worn off in exposed locations (such as the sills). Gone, however, as part of the 1930s alterations, are the original western porch, the gabled end walls and the slate roof with its central "belfry".

The 1930s additions at the east and west ends generally take the form of simple gable-roofed wings in an extremely pared down style incorporating elements of both Inter-War Old English and Inter- War Gothic styles. The warm-red face brickwork of the walls, the wide-eaved red tiled roofs with exposed rafters and white-painted timber joinery are generally typical of the period and simply but carefully detailed. The symmetrical front elevation features a small projecting porch with gothic-arched opening decorated with chamfered bricks and hood-moulding and surmounted by a plaque bearing the St Andrew's cross (signifying the building's Presbyterian allegiance). Decorative elements generally include the modified "gothic arch" head to the main windows and doors, the decorative chamfered brick heads around these openings, the lead lighting to the original fanlights and small decorative friezes at the top of the gables on the major elevations.

Stones laid either side of the main entry date to 27 September 1930, one being set "on behalf of the congregation of St David's by Mrs T. McLeod and the other in grateful remembrance of the gift by the Ramsay family of this land, church building and the original school hall in 1869 ... by Rev W.J. Gray, BA. Minister of St David's.

At the rear (east end) of the hall the slope of the ground has allowed the insertion of a basement level below a raised level comprising the stage and associated storerooms. On this elevation both ingle and two-storey elevations are more simply dealt with (including, for example, only squarehead casement windows and doors) but retaining some of the detailing of the major frontages in the chamfered brick heads and corner buttresses. The yard to the south-east of the hall has recently been enclosed with modern steel-mesh to allow the secure storage of garden equipment while a children's play area has similarly been provided to the south of the west end of the hall. The interior of the hall bears witness to the varied origins of its component parts in much the same manner as the exterior. At the western end a pair of small offices adjacent to larger meeting rooms are located either side of the entry hall within the 1930s wing across the front of the original building. This Junction is clearly expressed at the point where the north–south-running brick walls of the 1930s intersect the remaining section of the 1860s brick west wall (both walls currently being painted white).

The main auditorium (the original hall) retains some important evidence of its origins – including the plastered finish of the side walls with their pairs of gothic-arched windows with stone surrounds (now painted) but much of the fabric and character of this space dates to its 20th century alterations including the battened and sheeted ceiling (presumably lining the underside of the original roof framing) and the various high-waisted, panelled doors at the east and west ends. The stage at the east end, modified several times before 1931 generally appears to comprise early 20th century fabric and detailing. Rooms along the east wall of the stage provide storage and dressing room facilities.

Of the two flanking wings, the north contains a single large room while the south contains kitchen and servery/scullery and smaller meeting (now store) room. These 1930s additions generally feature face-brick walls, timber floors (in several areas covered with vinyl tiles), battened and sheeted plaster ceilings (probably fibrous plaster), timber panelled doors and built- in timber joinery (cupboards, benches, etc.). Though showing signs of age and general wear and tear, many of the spaces appear to be largely as built with fit-out and finishes remarkably intact. The basement rooms at the rear (east) end of the hall generally comprise lavatory and storage facilities, this area being accessed from the outside via the central door.

==== Manse ====
The 1911 Manse, built to the design of A. M. Allen, and located to the north of the church with a frontage to Dalhousie Street, was the last of the major structures to be erected on the site. Built in the 'Federation Bungalow" style which characterised much of the early 20th century's residential development in the state - and in Haberfield particularly - the building is a substantial, well designed and notably intact example of this important style. The building is set in a substantial, well established garden, located back from the road and behind a decorative wrought iron fence which picks up elements of the adjacent fence in front of the church. The separation from the church is relatively generous the two precinct sharing a boundary which is informally defined by a modern wire fence. Though sited away from the street frontage and church, the Manse maintains important links to both, visually and functionally. The main west elevation features the asymmetrical layout, massing and formal elements typical of its style including a broad-spreading slated hip roof with terracotta ridging and small ventilator gambrels, a gable-roofed projecting wing with rectangular bay window expressing the presence and importance of the main living room, a smaller gable-roofed porch breaking the line of the verandah roof to mark the entrance with its decorative cut-out frieze and brackets (understood traditionally to represent the Trinity and thus point to the ecclesiastical context of the building).

The front verandah, under the slated main roof, continues around the north-west corner to line the front half of the north elevation 'm a manner typical of the Federation style and to provide sheltered access to the Minister's study. The verandah roof is supported on squat timber posts supported on a brick balustrade. Moulded timber capitals, neck-moulds and a "gothic-arch" frieze provide decorative interest. The floor is paved with encaustic tiles and stairs provide access on both the front (west) and north elevations. The external walls are generally of warm-red face-brick with darker purple-brown bricks used dressings such as windows heads, the surrounds to the rondel window, window sills and balus Rough-cast plaster is used at the top of the gable of the front bay while the gables to the north east are left plain as befits their secondary status. The two pairs of rendered chimneys feature decorative mouldings and fluting and are topped with terracotta chimney pots. The timber-framed windows and doors include casements with a semi-circular fanlight above to the front bay window, a small rondel window opposite the main entry stairs, double-hung sash windows more generally and high-waisted panelled doors throughout. Decorative stained-glass leadlight feature in the small rondel window and main entry door.

The layout of the Manse is generally as originally built with the main entry hall/corridor flanked by bedrooms to the north, living and dining to the south. At the east end of this hall, a doglegged cross hall allows internal access to the Minister's study and bedroom on the north and bathroom to the south. The continuation of the central corridor to the rear bedrooms and living rooms is then itself offset to give useful privacy to this area of the residence - with a cast iron column used to provide the necessary roof support in the line of the corridor wall. The rooms at the rear (east) of the building, though generally within the original envelope, are (as noted in the exterior) both simpler in character and more altered. Throughout the residence much of the original fabric, fitout and finishes survive, these including plastered walls with moulded timber picture rails and plaster vents, decorative pressed metal ceilings and cornices, panelled timber doors (many with glazed fanlights) and timber floors (mostly carpeted).

Features of particular interest include the built-in linen cupboard (in the rear cross hall), the original timber mantle-pieces in the main bedroom and Minister's study, the simple timber frieze (with cut out leaf-motifs) to the rear cross hall (so typical of the Federation bungalow) and the window bay to the main living room. Alterations in the major front rooms are surprisingly few and are generally restricted to the removal of the living and dining room mantle pieces (the living room being replaced with a reproduction Victorian surround and grate) together with the usual changes to the bathroom fitout, lighting and decoration.

The condition of original fabric varies and though quite good and sound in many areas. evidence of past and on-going deterioration was noted in some places including rusting of pressed metal ceilings and staining of upper wall areas due to water entry (through the roof), lifting paintwork and plaster due to rising damp in lower wall areas and settlement cracking both in (generally) exterior walls and the plaster lining to the archway in the cross hall. At the rear of the building the spaces are more substantially altered both in layout and detail including the recently renovated kitchen-family room, the infilling of the rear verandah as a sunroom (with modern sheeted ceiling and external wall linings) and attached laundry and WC (accessed at ground level). Problems with fabric deterioration, water penetration and staining (particularly through the low-pitched sun-room roof and its various junctions) and settlement of brickwork, notable in the south-wall of bedroom 5 opening into the sun-room.

As at 10 July 2002, it was reported that as a whole, the assemblage of historically, socially and aesthetically important values remain within the visually and functionally unified precinct. Much of the earlier and significant fabric of the site is in reasonable to good condition however works to areas and fabric are generally need where ongoing deterioration of significant fabric includes salt deterioration in stone, rising damp, deterioration in stonework of the tower, deterioration to exposed 19th century timbers and cracking of masonry. The Ramsay Vault within the Vault Reserve has archaeological potential available for study.

The overall site configuration has a high degree of integrity and intactness as it includes the remains of the original land holding and layout of major components that include vault reserve, church, hall and manse.

=== Modifications and dates ===
==== Original Boundary ====
In 1825 the building of a new carriage-house, stables and cow-house commenced on Dobroyd Estate. 1828 an important plant nursery was established that includes a new citrus orchard between Ramsay Road and Long Cove Creek. During the 1830s, an extension made to Dobroyde House . In 1855 the Ramsay estate was established 300 metres north-west of Dobroyde House. Dobroyde estate was divided in 1860 with 1.6 hectare (4 acres 16 perches) laid aside for a burial-ground, church, school-hall and manse.

==== Vault ====
During 1861–1862, building began on the vault and the school-hall. The vault was completed sometime before June 1862. By 1907 a 2-metre-high fence was erected around the whole Vault Reserve and general renovations made to the Burial ground. In 1910 the perimeter was trenched and a hedge of trees planted

==== Hall ====
The suburbs of Ashfield, Summer Hill opened in 1883 and Kegworth opened in 1887. Dobroyde estate broken up into sub-divisions. The Federation precinct of Haberfield begin in 1901. In 1903 the first two major land sales occurred, on which a garden suburb was created and Dobroyde House demolished. The Presbyterian precinct increasingly hemmed in by suburban streets and intensive housing. The original Dobroyde hall continued to be used for Sunday School. Repairs to the church were made in 1898 and in 1903 when a new ceiling and platform were installed: this platform was altered in 1924.(30) A borrowing library had been installed in the hall by 1904. In 1907 the Masonic Lodge put portable wooden shutters on the windows. An annexe was built at the east end of the hall well before 1908. In 1909 a new fence 17 metres (50 feet) long was installed in front of the hall and trees were planted as part of a wider improvement of the Dalhousie frontage of the church complex. During 1915, electricity was finally switched on in the hall. Around 1931 the walls of the 1862 hall were incorporated and rectangular sections were added at right angles to the front and back of the 1862 building.

==== Church ====
St David's church was completed in 1869. The flooring was completely removed in 1895, the area below the floor-boards was cleaned and coated with asphalt and a new floor was laid in both church and vestry. At the same time the internal walls of the church were cleaned and coloured with wash. The spire was surmounted by a weathervane and the four top corners of the tower were decorated with stone obelisks on pillars with stone palisading on each side of the tower. In March 1913 the tower was struck by lightning. As a result, it was necessary to remove the original palisading and the corner obelisks at the top of the tower and base of the spire. In 1915 the tower was demolished. The church roof required new woodwork and replacement of slates in 1907, while in the following year an asphalt path 1.8 metre (6 feet) wide from the porch to Dalhousie Street was laid and the original small entry gates were taken elsewhere and new gates erected. In 1909, Excelsior ventilators were inserted in the roof and the lead ridge-capping was replaced. A new front fence was erected. In 1909, the church bell was transferred to the tower. No fewer than eight modem stained glass windows have been donated as memorials to individuals between 1946 and 1998

==== Curtilage ====
St David's Road extended to the north across the precinct and St David's Road now ran to the east of the Vault Reserve, cutting across the L-shaped Manse Reserve (reducing it to a rectangle) and joining the existing Kingston Street on the north side of the church land. This part of Kingston Street was then renamed St David's Road and Kingston Street now beams only north-east of Ramsay Street. Eight allotments were created by this sub-division and the proceeds from their eventual sale were earmarked for building the manse resulting in the present boundary and curtilage.

==== Organ ====
A two-manual organ installed in 1920 along with the 415-volt electric motor that was installed in a vault below the vestry, 150 by 125 em. (5' by 4W) and 150 em high at the lowest point. In 1923 the motor was moved outside. In 1926 this motor and the blower were entirely replaced by a Weston Patent Blower. New choir stalls were also introduced in 1959 in the north aisle of the church. In 1964, the organ moved to the opposite end of the church

==== The Manse ====
The foundation stone was laid on 22 April 1911. The original laundry became an additional bedroom and a new brick laundry was created and the picture rails were omitted from the kitchen. The south-west side of the house was tuck-pointed and Venetian blinds were supplied. The undeveloped land around the new manse was laid out as a garden the actual creation of the garden occurred in 1912. The manse continued to be lit and heated by gas until November 1924 when electricity, already connected to the church and school-hall, was installed. By 1930, the interior and exterior of the manse was painted. There were also extensive repairs during 1940 and 1951 but the details are not recorded.

==== The Grounds ====
The earliest fencing along the Dalhousie Street frontage was simply a one-rail wooden fence, shown in a sketch in 1892. By 1905 this had been replaced by a two-rail wooden fence in front of the church and schoolhall, but continuing to the south with a fence of vertical slabs between two horizontals, In 1909 the wooden fencing along the church frontage was replaced with a more handsome stone wall, 60 cm (2 feet) high, surmounted by cast-iron railings 75 cm (2W') high. The new entrance, curving in from the street alignment, had stone pillars on both sides. The north gate-post was inaugurated with a stone inscription. The asphalt path from the church porch to the street was first laid in 1908 and a wider area of asphalt there in 1910 and the first tennis court was laid out immediately behind the school-hall, parallel to the southern boundary. A second tennis court was built in 1913 to the east of the first court but at right angles to it and hard against the southern boundary, opposite the Vault Reserve. In 1930 the extensions to the school-hall removed part of the westerly tennis court, so only the lower court was available. The surface of the upper court was transferred to the lower and dug in over four days in May 1930

== Heritage listing ==
The St. David's Uniting Church site is of state significance as one of a few surviving examples of a church precinct retaining its original church, hall, manse and private burial ground, all of which is an individual item of high significance located within a relatively expansive and attractive landscaped site. Such an assemblage of relatively high integrity and intactness is rarely found, particularly among Presbyterian or Uniting churches in NSW. The precinct is significant for reflecting the will for reunion of the schismatic Presbyterian churches in the 1860s, the deeply committed philanthropy of its founders, particularly the Ramsay family, and is associated with a succession of notable ministers, kirk sessions and congregational members. The individual components of the precinct - including church, hall, manse and Vault Reserve - each have notable historic, aesthetic and social significance at both state and local levels, the Ramsay vault in particular being an item of rarity and high value. The spacious grounds within the local area are an attractive landmark and open space within a more highly developed, important suburban precinct of state significance.

St David's Uniting Church was listed on the New South Wales State Heritage Register on 19 August 2003 having satisfied the following criteria.

The place is important in demonstrating the course, or pattern, of cultural or natural history in New South Wales.

St David's Uniting Church site is of historical significance to the state as a rare surviving example of a church precinct retaining its original church, hall, manse and private burial ground - each an item of individually high significance - within a still relatively expansive and attractively landscaped site. The hall is significant because it was built by private philanthropy to house the first Presbyterian Sunday School in the state and though subsequently altered, the major part of the original (1861-2) structure remains. The church's historic significance arises from a number of factors including its association with the earliest stages of the expansion of Presbyterianism in NSW after the reunification of the denomination in 1865, as a notable example of private philanthropy assisting the work of the church over a considerable period. The manse also reflects and contributes to the historical pattern of development of the new Federation suburb of Haberfield exemplifying and furthering its distinctive models of architectural and landscape character. The site has a high degree of historical significance as it has continued in its function as a church and for its associated community use that has extended over three centuries.

The place has a strong or special association with a person, or group of persons, of importance of cultural or natural history of New South Wales's history.

St David's precinct is highly significant for its important associations with the Ramsay family, past ministers of note including Auld, Merrington, MacInnes and Cumming Thom whose intellectual and leadership qualities gave the church standing not only in the local community but also within the Presbytery of Sydney and the wider ecclesiastical community. The church's organ in its original 1920 case is a fine example of the work of the major South Australian organ builder Josiah Dodd and is important as a good representative example of his work. The manse provides important evidence of the consolidation of the site as a center for Presbyterian outreach in the local area. It also has strong associations with three prominent Presbyterian layfolk - Sir James Burns and Colonel and Mrs Goodlet. Other important associations include Simeon Lord, Peter McCormick who published his "Advance Australian Fair" c. 1878, Dr John Dunmore Lang - a stormy petrel of Presbyterianism in NSW and Prince Albert, The Duke of Edinburgh.

The place is important in demonstrating aesthetic characteristics and/or a high degree of creative or technical achievement in New South Wales.

The St David's Church precinct has considerable aesthetic significance within the local area as a sizable landscaped precinct of contrasting but compatible structures - including church, hall, manse and private burial ground - each item having important aesthetic qualities of its own and set within an area of relatively open grounds and large trees. It is an important and sizable early remnant of past development within the notable Habeffield residential estate. The siting of the precinct - and particularly the church - atop a low rise with a sizable frontage to Dalhousle Street contributes to its role as a local landmark within an area more densely developed. It also demonstrates a way of life in the nineteenth century when churches were allocated prime landmark locations to emphasise their importance to the community. The church has high local significance as a substantial, well executed and relatively intact example of mid Victorian Gothic ecclesiastical architecture and a good example of the work of its architect Thomas Rowe. The manse has local significance as substantial and well detailed example of Federation bungalow, this significance enhanced by the building's high degree of intactness and important functional and visual relationships with the surrounding church precinct. The manse is also an important contributory component to the rich architectural fabric of Haberfield, exemplifying and furthering its distinctive models of architectural and landscape character.

The place has a strong or special association with a particular community or cultural group in New South Wales for social, cultural or spiritual reasons.

St David's Church has local social significance arising from both its historical and contemporary functions and associations including its early and continuing Sunday School and church operations and its provision of community and sporting facilities for the wider community. The site is also of high significance to the Ramsay family descendants of its founders, as shown by the continuing voluntary work on the Vault Reserve and the Ramsay memorial. The installation of memorial stained glass windows in the church within the last 50 years is also an example of the ongoing importance of the site within the lives of its members past and present. The grounds within the precinct have high local significance through their links with the original Dobroyd estate and because they have provided recreational facilities for the area over many years through the tennis courts and Tennis club and Youth Community and other facilities.

The place has potential to yield information that will contribute to an understanding of the cultural or natural history of New South Wales.

The Ramsay Vault within the Vault Reserve has archaeological research significance arising from its unusual construction, which is available for study. The Vault Reserve is of archaeological significance as a fine assemblage of grave-markers erected for a single family group over a century. The grounds of the church complex provide useful information on the development of the less well documented leisure and social activities of the congregation over time.

The place possesses uncommon, rare or endangered aspects of the cultural or natural history of New South Wales.

The Vault Reserve's cemetery is highly significant as a rare and substantial example of a private burial ground within a major church curtilage and reflects both the original influence and continued associations of the site with the Ramsay family. It is also one of a few surviving family graveyards in inner Sydney. The Ramsay Vault within the Vault Reserve is highly significant as a relatively substantial and well detailed example of early stone burial vault and is one of the finest of its kind in the state.. The organ at St David's is also rare as it was the sixth organ out of eleven to be built by Josiah Dodd for a NSW Church.

The place is important in demonstrating the principal characteristics of a class of cultural or natural places/environments in New South Wales.

The precinct has high representative values as a significant 19th century church property. It also represents 19th century social values where the allocation of prime landmark locations for the purpose of constructing a church symbolised a family's importance in society.

== See also ==
- List of Uniting churches in Sydney
- Presbyterian Church of Australia
