= Yasmar =

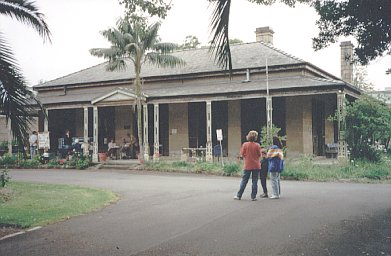

- Location within inner Sydney
- 33°52′51″S 151°08′02″E
- Location: 185 Parramatta Road, Haberfield, New South Wales, Australia

History
- Built: 1856–1858

Site notes
- Architect: John Bibb
- Owner: Land and Property Management Authority (LPMA)

New South Wales Heritage Register
- Official name: Yasmar; Yasmar Hostel; Juvenile Remand & Detention Centre; Yasmar School
- Type: State heritage (complex / group)
- Designated: 18 February 2000
- Reference no.: 1379
- Type: Villa
- Category: Residential buildings (private)
- Builders: Unknown

Yasmar is a heritage-listed house at 185 Parramatta Road, Haberfield, New South Wales, Australia. It has variously served as a private home, Sunday school, children's court and juvenile remand and detention centre, and is now used by community groups and as a correctional services training facility. It was designed by John Bibb and built from 1856 to 1858. The surrounding site has also been known as Yasmar Hostel, Yasmar Detention Centre, Yasmar Child Welfare Home, Ashfield Remand Home, Yasmar Shelter and the Yasmar Juvenile Justice Centre. The property is owned by Land and Property Management Authority (LPMA) (State Government). It was added to the New South Wales State Heritage Register on 18 February 2000.

== History ==
=== The Ramsay and Learmonth families and the construction of Yasmar ===
In 1803, a land grant of 480 acres, the boundaries of which form the present day suburb of Haberfield, was made to NSW Army Corps Ensign Nicholas Bayley (or Bailey) and known as "Sunning Hill" Farm. The land was sold for 850 pounds in 1805 to Simeon Lord (1773-1840), wealthy emancipist who changed the locality name to "Dobroyde" (note with an 'e') after his cousin's home, Dobroyde Castle, Lancashire, England where he had spent much of his youth. Lord had been convicted in 1790 for stealing cloth and was transported to Sydney for seven years. He arrived in 1791 and after his release became a very prosperous businessman. By 1820, he was recorded as being the largest landholder in Sydney.

In 1825, Simeon Lord's daughter, Sarah Anne, married Dr David Ramsay. Ramsay, born in Scotland in 1794, had graduated from the Royal College of Surgeons of Edinburgh and had arrived in NSW as a ship's surgeon aboard the "Surry", a convict transport in 1820. Two years later he returned and established a business with his former ship's captain, Thomas Raine. The firm of Raine & Ramsay was a broadly based trading enterprise, located on the corner of Bligh and Hunter streets, Sydney billing itself as 'ship owners, agents, general merchants and wool brokers'; Ramsay also held several offices with Scots Church, Sydney. There was a conditional transfer of Dobroyde Estate as a dowry. The Ramsays built their home "Dobroyde House" on a crest of their estate fronting Parramatta Road between present day Dalhousie Street and Rogers Avenue. It was a timber cottage with a garden. The Ramsays moved into their new house in 1826. Mary Louisa, first of 10 children to the Ramsays, was born the same year. (9 of the 10 surviving children are buried in St David's church yard: one died young. Percy is buried in Brisbane. Family names are commemorated in Haberfield's street names e.g.: Lord, Ramsay, Yasmar, Dalhousie, Percy, Edward [now Hawthorne], St David's, Learmonth).

The Raine & Ramsay partnership did not last and Ramsay devoted much of his time to his Dobroyde estate, especially horticultural pursuits. He also had an inn known as "Speed the Plough" or "The Plough Inn" built on the Dobroyde Estate side of Parramatta Road at its junction with Liverpool Road. He owned the inn but leased it out for others to manage. It was a two-storey building with a verandah across the front and a single storey wing on each side. It was a noted landmark in the district. Here locals, travellers, and drovers taking cattle or sheep to the Glebe Island abattoirs could quench their thirst. In the 1860s a flour mill and bakery were built near the inn.

In the 1830s, Ramsay established the Dobroyde Gardens Nursey alongside Iron Cove Creek (now Hawthorne Parade). In 1840, Sarah and David Ramsay set up a home Sunday School at Dobroyde House, the first Home Sunday School of the Presbyterian Church of NSW. That year Dr Ramsay was presented with a silver medallion for "Pine Apple" at the Flora & Horticultural Society Show. David Ramsay owned most of what is now Haberfield and grew oranges and pineapples along the creek. Their son Edward Pierson Ramsay, who would become a prominent zoologist, was born in 1842.

In 1850 Mary Louisa Ramsay married Alexander Learmonth. Learmonth had been born in Scotland and had arrived in New South Wales in 1842. In 1854 the Ramsay's 3rd daughter, Isabella Helen was married to Dr John Belisario, English dentist, at Dobroyde by the Rev. Dr J Dunmore Lang [SMH 7.10.1854]. Dr Belisario was accredited as first colonial dentist to use ether as an anaesthetic; tooth extraction for Duke of Edinburgh in 1869; later he became a member of Linnean Society and Australian Museum. In 1855, four roads were constructed through Dobroyde Estate and named Ramsay, Dalhousie, Waratah and Boomerang. In the same year, 46 acres of the estate was transferred to Alexander and Mary Louise Learmonth.

In 1856, Learmonth commissioned architect John Bibb to draw plans for Yasmar house. The name stemmed from the Ramsay surname spelled backwards. It was designed for he and his wife Mary Louisa, who was the eldest daughter of David and Sarah Ramsay. The house was built between 1856 and 1858. The house and garden face Parramatta Road on a crest between present-day Bland & Chandos Streets further west of Dobroyde House. It is U-shaped with the rear wings for servants' quarters and service rooms. Learmonth lived at Yasmar until his death in 1877. The house's siting and garden layout was designed according to John Claudius Loudon's "Gardenesque" principles, including being set back from the main road, the carriage way, the siting of the stables, vegetable garden and offices.

Bibb had been arrived in Australia in 1832 and soon been employed by John Verge, continuing Verge's practice after he retired to Dungog in 1837. Bibb became auditor to Flora & Horticultural Society and committeeman for the Sydney School of Arts; he designed the School of Arts' headquarters in Pitt Street. He would also later design the Congregational Church in Pitt Street, Sydney. He died in February 1862 and was buried in the family vault at St Peter's Church, Cooks River.

The 1858 Sands Directory showed Alexander Learmonth as residing at Parramatta Road; Mary Louisa Learmonth is shown in residence at 70 Upper Fort Street, Sydney. The Dobroyde Sunday School was transferred to the western side room of Yasmar house in 1860. In June David Ramsay died in the garden of nearby Dobroyde house. The estate was divided into 20 blocks ranging in size from 1 acres to 23 acres amongst David and Sarah's 5 daughters and 5 sons, as required by the marriage settlement of 1825. Sarah Ramsay donated 4 acres for the dedication of the Presbyterian church, school, family vault and manse (built 1911) (now the heritage-listed St David's Uniting Church precinct, Dalhousie St Haberfield). In 1861 the foundation stone of St David's Church Hall was laid by Sarah Ramsay (the building continues to this day as the hall to St David's Church precinct; after Yasmar this the 2nd oldest building in Haberfield).

In 1861 Edward Pierson Ramsay was elected the founding treasurer of Entomological Society of NSW. He was a keen botanist who was friendly with the powerful plant men of the day, including William Macarthur of Camden Park and Alexander Macleay of Elizabeth Bay House. When Edward moved to Queensland to capitalise on the sugar rush, his plantation neighbour (at Tinana, Maryborough) was John Carne Bidwill, botanist and plant hunter (and Commissioner of the Wide Bay district), who discovered the Queensland kauri (Agathis robusta) and the bunya pine (Araucaria bidwillii).

In 1862 St David's Church Hall opened as a Sunday School and a day school, called Yasmar, during week days (the forerunner of Haberfield Primary School); Mary Louisa Ramsay was appointed Superintendent of the school. In 1864 the Ramsay brothers Edward Pierson, James and Percy purchased the Jindah sugar plantation at Maryborough, Queensland; Percy resided there. In May 1866 the first Divine worship was held in St David's School Hall, conducted by the Rev. Dr John Dunmore Lang. In 1867, Edward Pierson Ramsay opened the New Dobroyde Plant and Seed Nursery on the same Iron Cove Creek site as Dr Ramsay's Dobroyde Gardens Nursery. As a horticulturist he had much input into Victorian garden design and species registration.

In 1874 Edward Pierson Ramsay, ornithologist and zoologist, was appointed the Curator of the Australian Museum (a post he held until 1894). He moved from Dobroyde house to quarters at the Museum. In January 1875 the Linnean Society of NSW held its 1st meeting with Sir William Macleay and Edward Pierson Ramsay original committee members. E. P. Ramsay became a fellow of the London Linnean Society and married Ellan Fox that same year.

In 1877 Alexander Learmonth died in his garden at Yasmar, he was buried in the family vault at St David's Church. His wife Mary Louisa stayed there until 1891.

1882 saw the release of "The Dobroyd Estate" along St David's Road to St David's Church, being inheritance lands of Louisa Ramsay. In 1885 three further sections of The Dobroyde Estate were subdivided and sold for Victorian type residential subdivision near Parramatta Road (being Ramsay heirs Isabella's portions between present day Wattle/Alt Streets and southern end of Dalhousie/St David's/Dobroyd (now O'Connor) streets; and an area around Percy/Lord/Sloane/Marion/Hawthorne streets belonging to Louisa, Margaret and David Ramsay).

In 1886 Edward Pierson Ramsey sold a portion of his inheritance. Long Cove Creek and Parramatta Road. In 1888, following the museum's decision to use the curator's quarters for office space, he moved to Dalhouise house, on the present day site of Dobroyd Point Public School in Waratah Street, in 1888.

In 1889 Sarah Anne Ramsay died. In 1892 the depression inhibited further sale of the Dobroyde Estate inheritance lands. In 1894 Mary Louisa Learmonth and her unmarried daughter, Mary, took an Indenture Mortgage to Mutual Life Association. In the 1890s land west of Yasmar was leased to horticultural nursery Wadd Pty Ltd.

In 1902 Mary Louisa vacated Yasmar and moved to live with her daughter, Mary, at Concord.

=== Grace family and Stanton residential development ===
In 1901 real estate agent and entrepreneur Richard Stanton purchased 43 acres of The Dobroyde Estate from Ramsay heirs Margaret (present day bounded by Waratah, Dalhousie, Hawthorne and Barton Streets) and David (Dalhousie, Ramsay, Barton and O'Connor). He commenced development of Australia's 1st "garden suburb" - residential subdivision on a "design and construct" formula. Stanton named the new garden suburb "Haberfield", and subsequently bought further Ramsay heirs' land, including Dobroyde House.

In 1903, Yasmar house and 49 acres were leased to Joseph Grace. Grace, born in England in 1859, had migrated to Australia c.1880. He and his brother Albert established a drapery business which became Grace Bros. During this period leadlight panels were fitted in Yasmar's doorways and "Federation" style mantelpieces were installed reflecting contemporary taste. Joseph Grace died at Yasmar on 5 July 1931. His wife Sarah Selina continued to live there.

Also in 1903, Mary Louisa transferred Yasmar land from the Old System to Torrens Title and transfers Yasmar land to her unmarried daughter, Mary. The same year Stanton released the 2nd Haberfield Estate on Ramsay heirs Margaret, John and James' lands (around Haberfield/Stanton streets). He demolished Dobroyde House to construct his own home, "The Bunyas", in the Arts and Crafts architectural style. This was reputedly designed by Haberfield Estate architect John Spencer-Stansfeld (the site is now in Rogers Ave and was later used as headquarters for the Scout Association of Australia).

In 1904 Yasmar house and 8 acres of land was sold to Albert Edward Grace.

In 1905 a large portion of Yasmar land to the north west of the house was resumed by the State Government for Haberfield School (now bounded by Bland, Denman and Chandos Streets). That year Stanton released his 3rd Haberfield Estate on Ramsay heirs Louisa's and Percy's lands, being land east and west of Yasmar house and Dobroyde house (present day bounded by Alt/Ramsay/Dalhousie streets); continuation of 1st Estate to Deakin, Dickson street. The Haberfield School opened in 1910.

In 1907 was the naming of the new post office as "Haberfield" which was contested by the Ramsay family.

In 1908 Denman Avenue was created (honouring the 3rd Baron and 5th Governor-General of Australia) along a reduced northern curtilage of Yasmar; the original rear entry to stables became Yasmar Avenue in the last Stanton Haberfield subdivision.

In 1911 Stanton subdivided Edward Pierson Ramsay's inheritance lands on what had been the New Dobroyde Plant and Seed Nursery (now Tressider Avenue) (Tressider was a horticulturist who took over New Dobroyde Plant and Seed Nursery then later moved the business to a site opposite Yasmar, renaming it 'Camellia Grove'; this was later involved with Professor Waterhouse of Eryldene at Gordon (site now present day Muirs Motors).

That year Joseph Neal Grace married Sarah Selina Smith B.A. (known as 'Gypsy'), who was Lady Superintendent (Deputy Headmistress) of the Presbyterian Ladies' College, in Shubra Hall, Croydon (which had been built for previous owner, Anthony Hordern of the Hordern Bros Emporium). A. E. Grace transferred Yasmar to Gypsy Grace on her marriage to his son.

In 1912 Stanton developed his 5th Haberfield Estate on Ramsay heir, Sarah Buchan Thomson's lands (around Logan and Nicholls Avenues) (Buchan Thompson was the manager of Dr Ramsay's pastoral leases in NSW).

In 1913 James Ramsay (b. 1838) died at Dobroyde. In 1914 Mary Louisa Learmonth died, aged 88. In 1916 Edward Pierson Ramsay died at Croydon Park and was buried in the family vault St David's Church, Haberfield.

In November 1926 the Municipality of Ashfield approved resumption of Yasmar land north of its stables and west of its rear entrance, as an extension for Haberfield School.

On 5 July 1931 Joseph Neal Grace died "at his residence Yasmar".

=== Army quarters, children's court and detention centre ===
Between 1940 and 1944 Yasmar and Shubra Hall were both commandeered for officer quarters by the Australian Army during World War II. In 1944 the last remaining 6 acres of "Yasmar" land were transferred to the NSW Department of Education for an extension to playgrounds of Haberfield School and for use as a Children's Court. In April 1946 Yasmar house commenced use as a Children's Court and within its grounds "a remand centre for delinquent boys" started.

In 1948 the NSW Government acquired Gypsy Grace's property (2 acres being the last section of Ramsay's Dobroyde Estate) which had been leased to Wadds (Horticultural Nursery) Pty Ltd. (This was west of Yasmar's current estate). In 1949 Gypsy Grace died in The Astor apartments, Macquarie Street, Sydney, leaving no issue.

In 1959 a high corrugated iron fence was built to Parramatta Road (it was demolished in 1979) leaving only the Yasmar entrance gates and small section of original palisade fence. Detention centre wings were later constructed on either side of the driveway.

In the 1970s alterations and additions were made to the stables (carriage house). In 1976 the service wings of Yasmar house were altered and a 4th (northern) side of courtyard was constructed.

In 1976 Yasmar house and gardens were classified by the National Trust of Australia (NSW). In 1978 Yasmar house and gardens were listed on the Register of the National Estate. In 1981 James Broadbent (then of the National Trust of Australia (NSW)) nominated the house and garden as having State significance. That September the Heritage Branch of then Department of Planning recommended the house, its grounds and gates be a heritage item within the terms of the Heritage Act 1977.

In 1982 staged redevelopment of the remand centre occurred. The Heritage Council on 5 August that year requested a detailed landscape study be carried out and a management plan be prepared for the garden.

In 1984 footings of a brick wall between Yasmar house and the stables were uncovered.

In 1990 renovation works were carried out to the stables (carriage house). The garden was resuscitated by horticulturist Anne Steng, working with heritage landscape specialist Michael Lehany - including major weed removal efforts.

=== Closure of detention centre and community use ===
In 2003 the house and gardens were offered to be formally handed over to Ashfield Municipal Council. The NSW Department of Corrective Services still run a training facility in the western side of the property.

The NSW Department of Crown Lands administer the property.

An updated conservation management plan was prepared in 2008 (updated in 2012–13) and a garden action plan was prepared in 2012–13. Expressions of interest over future uses of the property were advertised by the Department of Crown Lands.

== Description ==
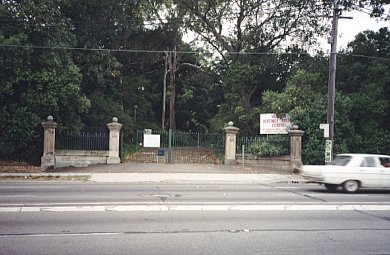
Original gates and section of palisade fence as seen from Parramatta Road with garden beyond

=== Remnant Estate and Grounds ===
The estate /garden is approached through Italianate-style sandstone gateposts, with Gothic recesses, and topped with a ball motif. "Yasmar 185" and "Yasmar 183" are painted on the post in black and gold paint. The remaining portion of the iron palisade fence also survives. The entrance has been widened to accommodate prison trucks as has the driveway generally, which has reduced the earlier border planting along the carriageway.

The winding entrance drive, with flanking shrubberies and central carriage loop (in fact an oval) of a mid 19th Century large suburban, leads from an impressive iron and sandstone entrance gateway, to an irregularly shaped carriage loop consisting of a roughly triangular shrubbery and an oval flower garden. The drive and loop are asymmetrically planned, curved for maximum length, screening and visual effect.

The carriageway turns around a tear drop shaped garden that is landscaped with modern plantings of shrubs and roses. It is likely that the planting within the carriageway circle was originally simply grassed with one or two feature trees. A depression within this area may have been an early water feature.

=== Garden ===
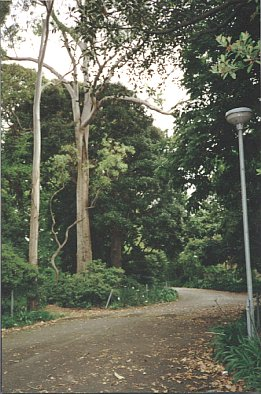
The serpentine carriageway with mature garden either side

The garden, established by the Learmonths dates from the Gardenesque, early Victorian period.

Archaeological remains of the dividing garden wall have been located towards the stables.

The diversity of plant material, particularly those indigenous to Queensland, is attributed to the association with Edward Pierson Ramsay, who was an active member of the Royal Horticultural Society of NSW. Today many of the special and rare trees planted have grown to maturity, examples being the Chilean wine /coquito palm (Jubaea chilensis), bunya pines (Araucaria bidwillii), figs (Moreton Bay fig, Ficus macrophylla and Port Jackson fig, F.rubiginosa), kauris (Queensland kauri, Agathis robusta and New Zealand kauri, A.australis) and fire wheel trees (Stenocarpus sinuatus), black bean trees (Castanospermum australe), brush box (Lophostemon confertus), pepperberry (Cryptocarya obovata) and cabbage tree palm (Livistona australis). Many of these species are uncommon in gardens, some are very rare. The New Zealand kauri is one of perhaps six mature such trees recorded growing in Australian gardens.

One nationally rare tree growing at Yasmar (one of only 31 known in Australia) is the palo alto tree (Picconia excelsa), a "cloud forest" or rainforest tree from the Canary Islands and Azores. This species is endangered in the wild due to land-clearing. Other specimens are in the Royal Botanic Gardens in Melbourne, Geelong and Sydney and select gardens such as Denham Court, Camden Park and Cooma Cottage, in NSW. The presence of such species in this garden give an indication of the level of horticulture practised by the Ramsays and Learmonths, and their connections.

Another is the puzzle bush (Ehretia rigida) from South Africa - this is the only specimen in a NSW garden apart from a couple growing in Camden Park estate's garden.

Unusual trees include maidenhair tree (Ginkgo biloba) south-west of the house's verandah.

A range of old-fashioned and now rare or at least unusual shrubs in Yasmar's garden includes native pear, Dombeya natalensis (South Africa); Lobelia laxiflora; Rangoon creeper (Quisqualis indica); some unusual Camellia japonica cultivars (likely with links to Camden Park) .

The garden beds below the verandah of the house also appear to be a recent addition as it was not common practice to plant gardens close to verandah at the time of the original layout of the garden. The land near the entry steps has been raised.

To the west of the carriageway is a rectangular, sunken masonry-lined (terraced) pit with brick detailing on the bottom, an ornate coping and end piece and benches on either side. Some sources suggest that this was a very early "swimming pool", however this could not be confirmed nor have other suggestions that it may have been a sunken conservatory or a shade house. The pit is now used a sunken garden but retains water and a pump was installed to remove the water, however this was taken from the site soon after installation. The brick sides appear to be bowing into the void and structural advice should be sought.

Above the "pool" there was a recent timber pergola (since collapsed and removed) but around this site is evidence of remains of timber posts and brick footings from previous structures.

The whole area is densely planted with trees and shrubs, many of which could be presumed to be original or early (i.e. 1850s-90s). Other large trees and shrubs are likely the progeny of original or early plantings. The largest trees are the Moreton Bay figs, bunya, hoop and kauri pines and several camphor laurels (Cinnamomum camphora). The garden may have been planned and planted by Edward Pierson Ramsay of the Drummoyne Plant Nursery.

An overgrown structure to one side of the drive appears to have been a sunken conservatory or shade house - a rectangular masonry pit with benches to either side. It is now covered by a later pergola. An unsympathetic timber annex has been built close by.

=== Former Service Drive ===
This ran on the current western perimeter boundary of the garden from Parramatta Road to the coach house/stables. Its alignment is still clearly marked by fig and bunya pine stumps which survive, a large camphor laurel tree at the rear of the Department of Corrective Services Training Facility block (this tree is approved for removal as it is impeding truck access to that block), and a clump of giant bamboo (Bambusa balcooa) near the northern end of the same block (also approved for removal for the same reason, but on condition of the replanting of another giant bamboo elsewhere in the rear garden/service yard. One of a former two old pepper(corn) trees (Schinus molle) survives north of the former coach house/stables block.

=== Service Yard ===
The original service yard at the house's north and west survives, much of it now paved with bitumen. It is used for parking.

=== Buildings - the House ===
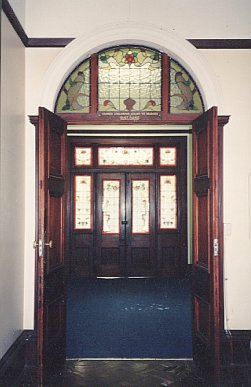
Internal hall doors

Built in the Victorian period, it is a symmetrical Georgian style residence but with cast iron pillars rather than columns on its verandah which encompasses it on 3 sides.

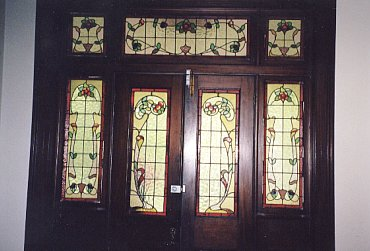
Art Nouveau stained glass doors, circa 1900

Yasmar's house is a single storey symmetrical building in Greek Revival style. It is built of sandstone blocks with flagstone verandah. The main slate roof has terra cotta ridge. The verandah is separately roofed and is supported by cast iron posts. There are French doors with shutters on the main and rear elevations. Windows display early and finely worked joinery detailing.

The wide entrance hall has curved corners. The original archway to the Secondary Hall has been infilled, with double-leaf swinging doors and a lead light top light. The main rooms to either side of the front hall are approached through 8 panelled, double doors. The hardware is not original and is in an art nouveau style.

Throughout the house there is evidence of changes to the original fabric in the door hardware, ceilings, lead lighting and some fireplaces, c. 1900. The ceilings reveal the original lath and plaster finish behind later cornices and there is a later wall frieze above the picture rail in the main hall and front rooms. The marble fireplace in front room 2 is original, however the fireplace in front room 3, with its timber batten wall detailing, may have been installed prior to Yasmar being sold to the Grace Family.

The house is flanked at the rear by two outbuilding service wings to form a courtyard behind the main house. The western wing has a cellar below. The wings have slate roofs with verandahs to the courtyard. Since Government ownership these wings have undergone extensive alterations, mainly to the internal spaces. Some detailing survives such as 6 panel doors.

The original well in the courtyard survives and today is a garden bed.

=== Stables ===
The stable building survives and underwent restoration works in 1995.

=== Condition ===
The physical condition of the house was reported as good at as at 18 October 1999. Because the central spine of the site has remained relatively undisturbed, there is high potential for archaeological investigation into the original garden layout and possibly earlier cultural artefacts.

The physical condition of the garden/ estate is overgrown, and while this makes it "romantic" it is really rather rundown. There are a lot of (probably bird-dropped seed) seedling/wildling trees and shrubs, along with some natural regeneration of deliberately planted species, such as the large trees (e.g.: bunya pine seedlings).

Both the House and the Garden are quite intact and remain as they were originally designed, both individually and as a purposefully contrived entity.

=== Modifications and dates ===
There have been only 3 major phases of changes to house and land by the 3 owners, the Ramsay and Grace Families, and current institutional owner. Overall there is minimal intrusion into the fabric and core significant areas.

==== The Land ====
- 1803 The original 480 acre land grant to Bayley (is now the current day suburb of Haberfield having the same peninsular and Parramatta Road boundaries)
- 1830s Dobroyde Gardens Nursery established alongside Iron Cove Creek.
- 1855 four roads built through the estate: Ramsay, Dalhousie, Waratah and Boomerang Streets.
- 1856-8 Yasmar House built and gardens, driveway laid out
- 1860 4 acres donated for building of a church, family vault and manse (to the north-west)
- 1862 Church hall opens
- 1867 New Dobroyde Plant & Seed Nursery established (on same site as Dobroyde Gardens & Nursery)
- 1869 "Princess Tree" Moreton Bay fig planted outside St. David's Church
- 1882 release of "Dobroyde estate" along St. David's Road to St. David's Church
- 1885 & 1886 Three small portions of the Dobroyde Estate are sold by Ramsay children heirs for residential subdivision
- 1890 land west of Yasmar leased to a horticultural nursery Wadd P/L
- 1901 Richard Stanton purchases the north eastern portion of Dobroyde Estate for the Haberfield garden suburb subdivision; further portions to east and around Yasmar are bought for subsequent extensions to Stanton's Haberfield Estates; the Haymarket Co. imitates the garden suburb philosophy in the Dobroyd Point area and portions on western edge
- 1903 release of second Haberfield estate subdivision and demolition of Dobroyde House. "The Bunyas" house is retained
- 1905, 1926 & 1944 part of remaining Yasmar lands resumed for Haberfield School.
- 1909 road widening (Dalhousie Street) and loss of "Princess tree" at St. David's Church
- 1920s St. David's Church spire removed
- 1944 construction of infill (court) building between house and both rear wings
- 1946 construction of Remand Centre for boys within grounds
- 1959 high corrugated iron fence erected to Parramatta Road frontage
- 19?-70s wings for Detention Centre built within grounds on either side of driveway
- 1970s alterations/additions to stables (carriage house)
- 1976 service wings of house altered and a fourth (new) side of the courtyard added
- 1979 corrugated iron fence on Parramatta Road frontage demolished, leaving only gates, posts and a small section of the original iron pallisade fence
- 1982 staged redevelopment of Remand Centre
- 1990 renovation work to stables (Carriage house)

==== The House ====
- 1856-8 built
- c. 1900 Low level Edwardian modifications by the Learmonth Family involved a few changes of interior decor (stained lead light glass, some fireplaces, room use changed to a library)
- 1944 Low level modifications by NSW Government for use as Court involving enclosure of part of east side verandah as magistrate's room, west side removal of wall to end verandah room to expand a room, construction of infill building between the house and both rear wings
- 1976 new addition to form northern 4th side of rear courtyard added (reversible)

==== Garden ====
The garden beds below the verandah of the house also appear to be a recent addition as it was not common practice to plant gardens close to verandah at the time of the original layout of the garden. The land near the entry steps has been raised.

- 1990/1: restoration of the Yasmar gardens under a Dept. of Public Works contract.
- 2009:

RTA built pedestrian overpass bridge slightly south-west of Yasmar near Parramatta Road/Bland St. intersection.

== Heritage listing ==
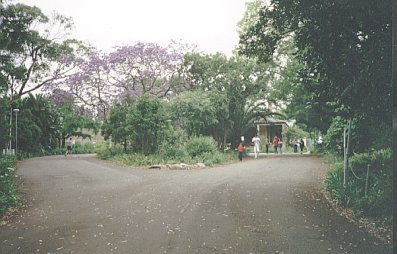
The carriageway 'tear drop' loop

The site of Yasmar survives as a rare example of a suburban villa in its garden setting that remains in a relatively intact condition. Yasmar is the only relatively intact villa house estate remaining on Parramatta Road, the oldest roadway in Australia, commenced in 1792. Other great estate houses in the vicinity no longer exist - Annandale 1808, Elswick 1805–25, Dobroyde, Ashfield Park 1820s. The house, stables and garden survive in layout and in relation to each other as originally intended. For these reasons the site is rare.

The garden has historic and aesthetic value as a now very rare example of the Gardenesque style surviving close to the city on a major arterial road and retaining connection with its original residence. The existing remnant garden allows an understanding both of the kind of setting thought appropriate to persons of wealth and taste and of this style's principles. The garden has historic, aesthetic, social and scientific significance for its purposeful layout in relation to the house and outbuildings, range of remnant vegetation and formal entrance gates on Parramatta Road.

The gateposts, gates and curved carriageway leading to the turning circle survive in near original condition. The scale of the surviving, now mature, garden marks it a landmark feature along Parramatta Road. The garden's scale and diversity of planting make it an important element in the Haberfield and Ashfield townscape; a welcome contrast to later commercial development along Parramatta Road.

Many examples of the garden's vegetation have high individual significance as well as being physical evidence of 19th century practices. The olives may be derived from William Macarthur's Nursery at Camden Park. The garden has associational links with David Ramsay, his son Edward Pierson Ramsay and Alexander Macleay, the latter two being founders of the Linnaean and the Australian Flora & Horticultural Societies.

Yasmar's house has historic, aesthetic and social significance at state level. It is a rare example of John Bibb's residential work. The property has strong associations with Simeon Lord, the Ramsay Family and GJN Grace. The house was used as a Sunday School in the 1860s, the first home Sunday School for the Presbyterian Church in New South Wales. This led onto the establishment of a week day school in the church hall, c. 1866, and subsequently Haberfield School in 1907. The use of the house as a children's court and in association with the remand centre and its school, has been a significant public use of the building.

Yasmar was listed on the New South Wales State Heritage Register on 18 February 2000 having satisfied the following criteria.

The place is important in demonstrating the course, or pattern, of cultural or natural history in New South Wales.

Yasmar house and its grounds have a strong association with the 3 former owners and their families, whose endeavours helped shape Australian society.

The property has associations with Simeon Lord, who was a wealthy merchant in the colonial period and who in 1840 had the greatest land ownership in the colony.

There is an association with the Ramsays, who were a significant family in the foundation of the suburb of Haberfield and in their role of establishing the local Presbyterian Church community. Members of the Ramsay family were also pioneers of the horticultural industry from the 1840s onwards.

The property was subsequently owned and has associations with J N Grace, a founder of the Grace Bros department stores.

The garden has a strong association with the Ramsay family, the Dobroyde Plant Nursery which was established by Edward Pierson Ramsay, and members of the Flora & Horticultural Society, including members of the Macleays of Elizabeth Bay House, and the architect John Bibb, who was the auditor of the Society. E P Ramsay was Curator of the Australian Museum, a founder of the Linnean Society and close associate with the Scott and Mitchell Families.

The place is important in demonstrating aesthetic characteristics and/or a high degree of creative or technical achievement in New South Wales.

Yasmar house remains as principal evidence of architect John Bibb's work. It is a rare example of his residential design and is the only known work surviving in a substantially unaltered condition to Bibb's original design. Bibb was an English-trained architect whose work here was almost entirely in the Greek Revival style. Before working in his own practice, Bibb had worked in, then took over, the office of architect John Verge, a highly significant architect in colonial Sydney.

The house is a fine example of a Regency designed villa in the Greek Revival style, with quality examples of Regency joinery detailing.

Yasmar grounds area rare example of the Gardenesque style garden, still in contact with the original residence, and surviving close to the city of Sydney.

Although much reduced in size, the existing remnant allows an understanding of the principles of a villa garden as set out by J C Loudon in his influential book "The Suburban Villa Gardener", reprinted in the 1850s. The classically designed gate posts, the gates and curved carriage way leading to the turning circle in front of Yasmar house, survive in near original condition, following Loudon's principles.

The scale of the surviving garden, which is now mature, makes it an important element in the local townscape and a landmark along Parramatta Road.

The place has a strong or special association with a particular community or cultural group in New South Wales for social, cultural or spiritual reasons.

Yasmar house remains as principal evidence of architect John Bibb's work. It is a rare example of his residential design and is the only known work surviving in a substantially unaltered condition to Bibb's original design. Bibb was an English-trained architect whose work here was almost entirely in the Greek Revival style. Before working in his own practice, Bibb had worked in, then took over, the office of architect John Verge, a highly significant architect in colonial Sydney.

The house is a fine example of a Regency designed villa in the Greek Revival style, with quality examples of Regency joinery detailing.

Yasmar grounds area rare example of the Gardenesque style garden, still in contact with the original residence, and surviving close to the city of Sydney.

Although much reduced in size, the existing remnant allows an understanding of the principles of a villa garden as set out by J C Loudon in his influential book "The Suburban Villa Gardener", reprinted in the 1850s. The classically designed gate posts, the gates and curved carriage way leading to the turning circle in front of Yasmar house, survive in near original condition, following Loudon's principles.

The scale of the surviving garden, which is now mature, makes it an important element in the local townscape and a landmark along Parramatta Road.

The place has potential to yield information that will contribute to an understanding of the cultural or natural history of New South Wales.

The site of Yasmar survives as a rare example of an early 19th century villa garden in the Gardenesque style, that remains in a relatively intact condition. There are many examples of vegetation in the garden that are of high individual significance and research value.

Individual items in the garden are also physical evidence of the practice of the exchange of exotic plan specimens between members of the Flora & Horticultural and Linnean Societies. The olives in particular may be derived from the Macarthur's Nursery.

The place possesses uncommon, rare or endangered aspects of the cultural or natural history of New South Wales.

Yasmar house is considered commensurate with John Verge buildings which have Permanent Conservation Order Status, such as Tempe House and Rose Bay Cottage. The house layout and fabric has survived relatively intact since it was first conceived and built, and is the only known example of a single storey residential building designed by John Bibb to survive. The garden is rare for its maturity and species of plants, and the fact that a fragile environment has survived within 5 km of the Sydney GPO. The 19th Century landscape principles remain evident as a rare research and educative resource. The house within its garden setting is a rare cultural environment and evidence of mid 19th Century society. Yasmar is the only example of a "villa estate" to survive along the length of Parramatta Road.

The place is important in demonstrating the principal characteristics of a class of cultural or natural places/environments in New South Wales.

The House is representative of the Greek Revival architectural style for a domestic mid 19th Century villa. The Garden is representative of the Gardenesque classical style of house and garden layout design typical of the early to mid 19th Century

== See also ==
- Australian residential architectural styles
