= St Stephen's Lutheran Church, Adelaide =

- St Stephani
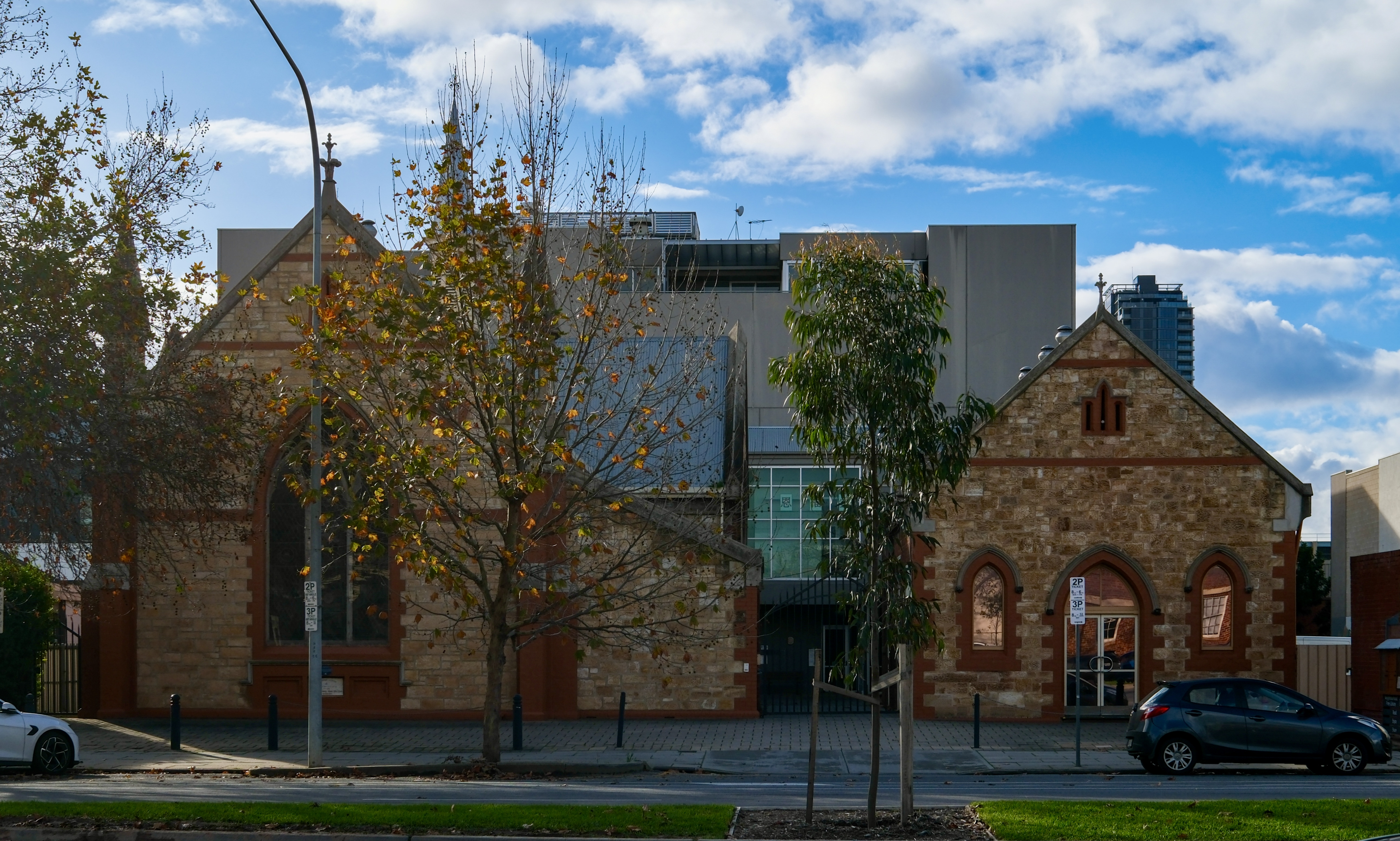
- The church in June 2026
- St Stephen's Lutheran Church, Adelaide
- 34.9279°S 138.6066°E
- Location: Adelaide, South Australia
- Country: Australia
- Denomination: Lutheran

History
- Founded: 1899
- Dedicated: 1900

Architecture
- Completed: 1900

St Stephen's, also referred to as St Stephani, (Note: Saint Stephen (feast day 26 December) is known in Germany by the Romanized Stephanus, of which the genitive case may be written Stephani. Note that in British (and Commonwealth) typography "St" is the standard abbreviation for "Saint", where "St." stands for "Street", the full stop (period) representing the elided terminal letters.) is a Lutheran Church on Wakefield Street, Adelaide, South Australia.

== History ==
Adelaide's first Evangelical Lutheran minister was Fred. Borgelt (died 1856), who led his congregation at premises in Klemzig through the years 1848–1856 and later met at the Dreifaltigkeits Kirche (Trinity Church), off Flinders Street. Borgelt was succeeded in 1859 by Johan Christian Maschmedt (died 1891), who served the congregation, which called itself the Evangelical Lutheran Church of Klemzig and Adelaide. Around 1860 some 40 members left to form a separate congregation.

The remainder, under Maschmedt, set about establishing a church in Pirie Street: the original St Stephen's, whose foundation stone was laid in 1862, and became known as the smallest church building in the city. He was replaced in 1891 by Rev. John Peter Niquet (1811–1903), who was forced by ill-health to resign a year later.

The congregation then aligned itself with the Immanuel synod, one of the three synods governing Lutherans in South Australia, and so received in 1892 the services of Rev. Johan Gottlieb Hegelau, who had been officiating in the Barossa Valley. (Note: Hegelau subsequently served at Horsham and Toowoomba, and retired to Melbourne.)

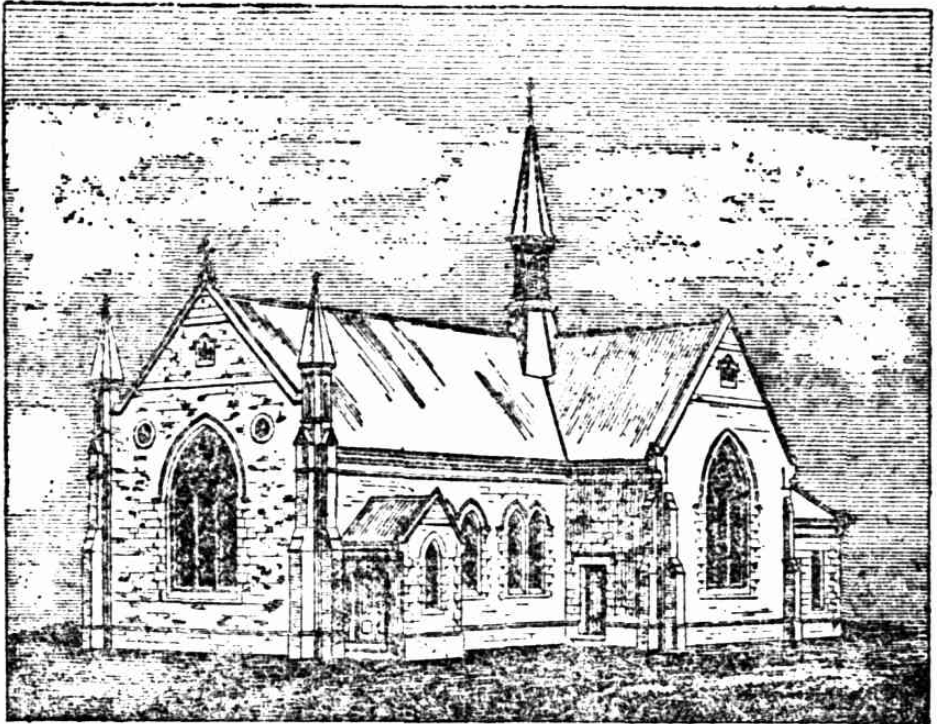
Architect's drawing

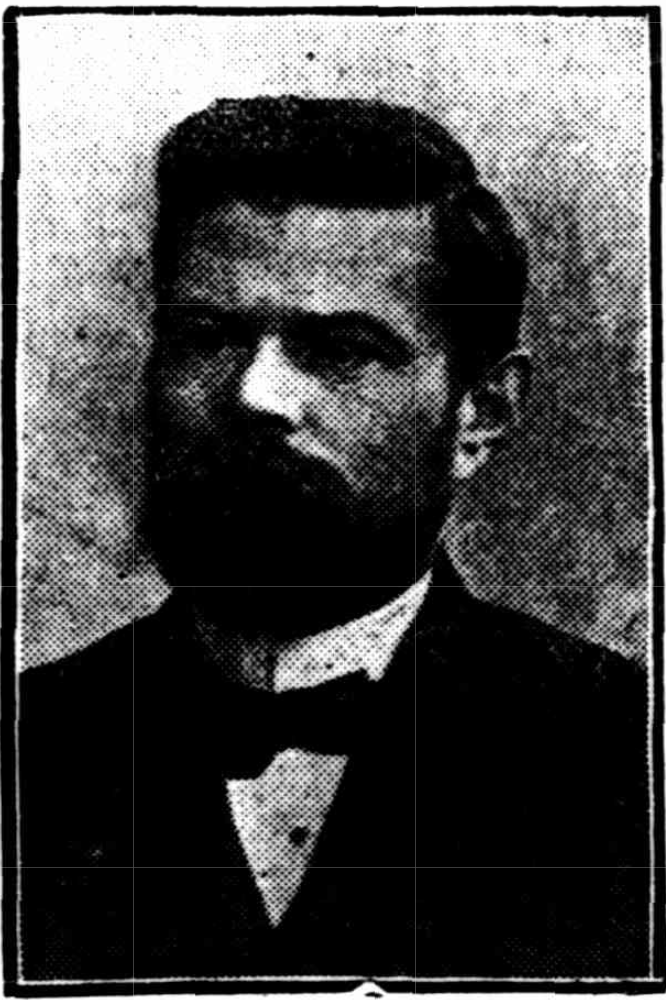
F. W. Basedow

He was relieved in 1896 by Ernst Johann Eitel, who wasted no time in establishing a much larger place of worship, on the north side of Wakefield Street, between Roper and Ackland streets, the foundation stone being laid on 14 October 1899. The church was opened for service on 11 February 1900, and cost £1705; subsequent additions and improvements brought its cost to £3500. St Stephen's was reported in 1912 as unique, in that services were entirely conducted in a foreign language (German), a local decision, not Lutheran policy. Eitel, a man of "marked ability", who invested his "whole time and strength" into his work and, "ably assisted by his whole family", was obliged to resign his pastorate "for stated reasons". He was succeeded in 1906 by Rev. Frederick William Basedow, who had a similar history of missionary service — ten years in Kamerun before returning to Australia, taking temporary positions as a relief pastor. He was in Murtoa when he received the call to St Stephen's. Basedow, a man of firm convictions and unshakeable faith, attracted a devoted congregation who soon whittled the church debt to a more manageable £400.

Basedow, whose family held a notable place in South Australian politics, administration and exploration, was the first Australian-born Lutheran pastor, and the longest-serving, though to many the most controversial. He was noted at the outbreak of The Great War for placing British citizenship above German heritage. His position statement was widely reported, but greeted with suspicion by conservative politicians, who viewed Germans, even established settlers, as untrustworthy.

In 1921 the United Evangelical Lutheran Church was formed with a view to healing the schisms in the denomination. Those taking part included the Immanuel Synod, Immanuel Synod a.a.G. (auf alter Grundlage = "on old basis"), Synod of Victoria, Synod of New South Wales, United German and the Scandinavian Synod of Queensland. St Stephen's was one of those who elected to join. Notwithstanding, a non-participating Evangelical Lutheran Church continued in South Australia.

Basedow retired at age 70 in 1937 and died in 1939; his remains were buried in the West Terrace Cemetery. His successor was Rev. Walter Wilfred Fritsch (1892–1983).

== Pipe organ ==
In 1913, with church debt mostly paid, the congregation turned its attention to the need for a pipe organ, (Note: Pastor Eitel's daughter had served as church organist, but details of the instrument have not yet been found.) and fundraising with that object began under pastor Basedow.

Fund raising for its replacement began in 1940, and the new instrument, a 21-stop two manual and pedal direct electric action instrument, built at J. E. Dodd's Gunstar works at Plympton, South Australia, was blessed by Rev J. H. Heidenreich, and opened by Clem. A. Geyer, (Note: Clemens August Geyer (died 1981) was a son of organist Theo Geyer.) of Tanunda.
