= Josiah Eustace Dodd =

Australian pipe organ builder (1856–1952)

- Born: 16 August 1856
- Died: 1952 (aged 95–96)

Josiah Eustace Dodd (16 August 1856 – 30 January 1952) was an Australian pipe organ builder, based in Adelaide.

== Biography ==
Josiah Eustace Dodd was born in Richmond, a suburb of Melbourne, Victoria, to Ebenezer Daniel Dodd (c. 1827–1889) and his wife Johanna Dodd, née Moloney, later of Castlemaine, Victoria. He was educated at St Stephen's Church School in Richmond, and apprenticed to the organ builder George Fincham of Bridge Road, Mitcham.

In 1881 Fincham sent Hobday and Dodd to South Australia to open a branch of the business in Adelaide, setting up in Twin Street. Arthur Hobday (1851–1912) was a son of Justin Harold "Harry" Hobday, organist and choir master at Christ Church, Geelong until 1870 when he left for Trinity Church, Geelong. Hobday was apprenticed to Fincham, then acted as client manager, organising plans and specifications, contracts, final inspection, tuning and voicing, then chasing up payments. Hobday and Dodd complemented each other, with Dodd taking responsibility for construction and finish, for which Hobday had no talent. Their first commission was a new organ for the Norwood Baptist Church, taking their old one (ex-Christ Church, North Adelaide) as part-payment; its component parts were later used to upgrade or refurbish other instruments.

They won a gold medal at the Adelaide Jubilee Exhibition in 1887.

In 1888 Hobday came into some money, purchased a half share of Fincham's business, and returned to Melbourne, leaving Dodd as Adelaide manager. The partnership of Fincham and Hobday was dissolved in September 1896 amid recriminations; Hobday settled in Wellington, New Zealand, where he ran a successful organbuilding business and died on 9 October 1912. In the early 1890s Australia was hit by a financial recession, and organ-building became unprofitable. Fincham & Hobday began laying off workers and taking any kind of work, even unprofitably, in order to retain their skilled staff. In this climate Dodd was able in 1894 to purchase the Adelaide business for £1000.

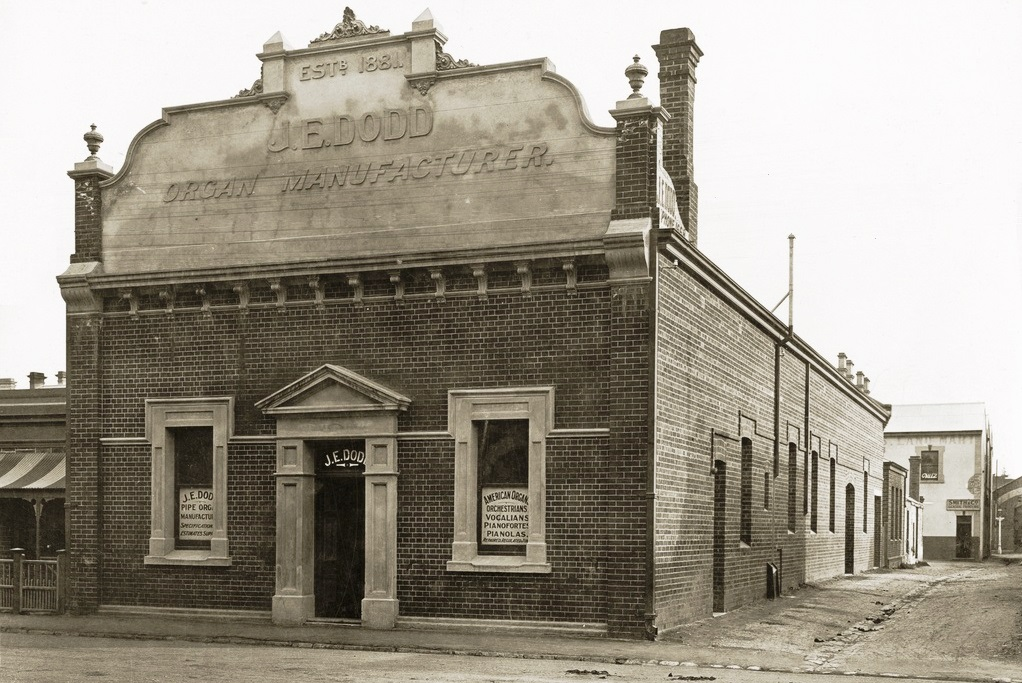
J E Dodd's Gawler Place premises c. 1906

Dodd workshops (Note: Before 1970, only the southern section of what is now Victoria Place was known by that name; the northern section was Molton Street and the centre section was further north, and extended to Gawler Place as the western half of Bray Street.) (Note: The workshop in Twin Street is likely to be that which became J. L. Lōb's electroplating shop in 1904.) and several nearby installations
1 Twin Street workshop (1881–1904)
2 Gawler Place workshop (1904– )
3 St John's church
4 St Paul's church
5 Unitarian church
6 Francis Xavier Cathedral

Dodd was able to convince South Australian churches of the benefits to be gained from dealing with a local manufacturer, and within a few years he had secured some substantial orders, notably Clayton Congregational Church in Norwood (1897), the Methodist Church in Kent Town (1898), and the Elder Hall on North Terrace (1901). His instruments were praised for their "high order of workmanship, light touch, and the ease with which they may be played" though they may have been less powerful than others.

In 1903 he opened a branch in Perth, managed by his eldest son Ebenezer, who won the contract for renovation and upgrading of the St George's Cathedral, Perth organ.

In 1905 he had a new showroom and factory built on Acre 271, west side of Gawler Place, between Flinders and Wakefield streets. The upper floor was devoted to refurbishment of pianos, which shortly became a growth industry as a result of Federal import duties being applied to musical instruments. Arthur Bishop (1868–1948) was appointed to manage this section.

In 1918 he opened a branch in Melbourne managed by his younger son Eustace.

Around 1935 the Gunn brothers, Bill Binding and Joseph Starling, frustrated by Dodd's autocratic ways and reluctance to adopt the latest technology, left the company and founded Gunstar Organ Works with premises at Plympton. With the advent of World War II, and many workers joining the 2nd AIF, the two companies amalgamated as J. E. Dodd & Sons Gunstar Organ Works.

Dodd retired around 1948.

In 1966 the company was still operating, as J. E. Dodd & Sons, at 2 Winifred Avenue, Plympton.

In 1979 the company was taken over by George Stephens.

== Some installations ==
Fincham & Hobday

- Norwood Baptist Church (1882)
- Christ Church Mount Gambier (1883 (opened by Boult, organist of St Peter's Cathedral, Adelaide)
- Rebuilt Pirie Street Wesleyan Church (Eagles of London)
- Tynte Street Church
- Archer Street Wesleyan Church
- Rebuilt Brougham Place Methodist Church
- Adelaide Jubilee Exhibition organ before installation in the Archer Street Wesleyan Congregation Church. "Presented by Mrs. John Dunn, assisted by a few friends, 1888."
- North Adelaide Baptist Church
- Modifications to (Hill & Sons) organ in Adelaide Town Hall (1886)

J. E. Dodd

- Clayton Congregational Church, Norwood (1897)
- St Andrew's Church, Walkerville (1897)
- Clayton Congregational Church (1898)
- Kent Town Wesleyan Church (1898)
- Methodist Church, Kent Town (1898)
- Unitarian Church, Wakefield Street (1901), replacing the Wolff organ described as "out of date and in hopelessly bad repair"
- Elder Hall, University of Adelaide (1901), later shifted to St Mark's Roman Catholic Cathedral, Port Pirie.
- St John's Church, Adelaide (1901)
- Extensive renovations to the German Church, Flinders Street (1904)
- The Church of St. Laurence the Martyr, North Adelaide (c. 1907)
- St Mary's, Eskbank, Lithgow, New South Wales (1909)
- St Mary's Cathedral, Perth (1910) This instrument, after being rebuilt twice, is still in use.
- St John's Cathedral, Napier, New Zealand (1910)
- St Matthew's Church, Guildford (1911)
- Victoria Square Methodist Church, Kadina (1911)
- Patterson Street Methodist Church, Launceston, Tasmania (1912)
- St Carthage's Cathedral, Lismore, New South Wales (1912)
- Coudrey Memorial organ at the Baptist Church, Parkside, South Australia (1913)
- Modifications to Archer Street Methodist Church (1914)
- St. Matthew's Anglican Church, Hamilton, South Australia (1914)
- Zion Lutheran Church Walla Walla, New South Wales
- St Martin's Anglican church, Killara
- Ross Memorial church, Murrumburrah
- St David's Uniting Church, Dodd's sixth in New South Wales
- All Souls' Church, Adelaide (1916)
- St Columba's Church, Adelaide (1916)
- Gartrell Memorial Church, Rose Park (1915)
- St Joseph's Church, Malvern, Victoria (1917)
- St Francis Xavier's Cathedral, Adelaide (1926, with additions to come when funds available)
- Trinity Congregational Church, Perth (1926)
- Wurlitzer organ in Regent Theatre, Adelaide (1928)
- Maughan Church (1929)
- St George's College Chapel, Perth
- St Stephen's Lutheran Church, Adelaide, Wakefield Street (1941) all-electric action
- Angaston Congregational Church (1943) historic organ from Draper Memorial installed by Dodd, Binding, Starling and Dodd jun.,
- St Patrick's Basilica, Fremantle electrified by Dodd's Gunstar works c. 1960

== Other Adelaide organ builders ==
- Walter George Rendall had a workshop at Ann Street, Stepney; built one for the North Adelaide Congregational Church, upgraded by Fincham & Hobday. Rendall was involved in 1908 dispute with Sydney's Pitt Street Congregational Church over non-payment of his account, they claiming breach of contract.
- Johann Wilhelm Wolff (c. 1818–1894) built nearly twenty church organs in SA, including St Francis Xavier's Cathedral's first organ in 1869, and the Unitarian church opposite, in 1877; both later replaced by Dodd.
- Robert McKenzie or Mackenzie (c. 1839–1905) erected the organs in Adelaide Town Hall (for William Hill & Sons, London) and St Peter's Cathedral (for Bishop & Son, London). He was obliged to defend the installation of both. His workshop was severely damaged by fire in 1881; he was suspected of arson.
- Samuel Marshall (1803–1879), music retailer of Adelaide, founder of Marshall & Sons, was originally an organ builder.
- William Leopold Roberts (died 1972), built "Memorial Organ" for St Andrew's Church in Brighton, Victoria.

== Family ==
On 10 April 1879 Dodd married Jessie Lovat Fraser of Inverness, Scotland at the Baptist Church, Richmond, Victoria. They had two sons and a daughter.

- Ebenezer Daniel Dodd ( – ) married Annie Maria Jordan in 1906. He was an organbuilder in Perth, with a shop on Hay Street and a home in Crawley.
- Duncan Eustace Fraser Dodd (c. 1886–1945) married Jessie Florence ?? in 1914, moved to Sydney, where he and partner William Crowle had business in York Street as Australasian representatives of the Rudolph Wurlitzer Company of New York. He left the firm around 1925, and an ex-employee, W. L. Roberts, took much of the cinema organ business.

They had a home on Osmond Terrace, Norwood, later Glenelg, where they celebrated their 70th wedding anniversary.
