= Pencil pine =

Pencil pine is a common name for several plants and may refer to:

- Athrotaxis cupressoides - Native to Tasmania, Australia
- Cupressus sempervirens - Native to the eastern Mediterranean region and widely planted as ornamentals in gardens
