= Henry Thomas Morris =

Australian pioneer and sheep inspector

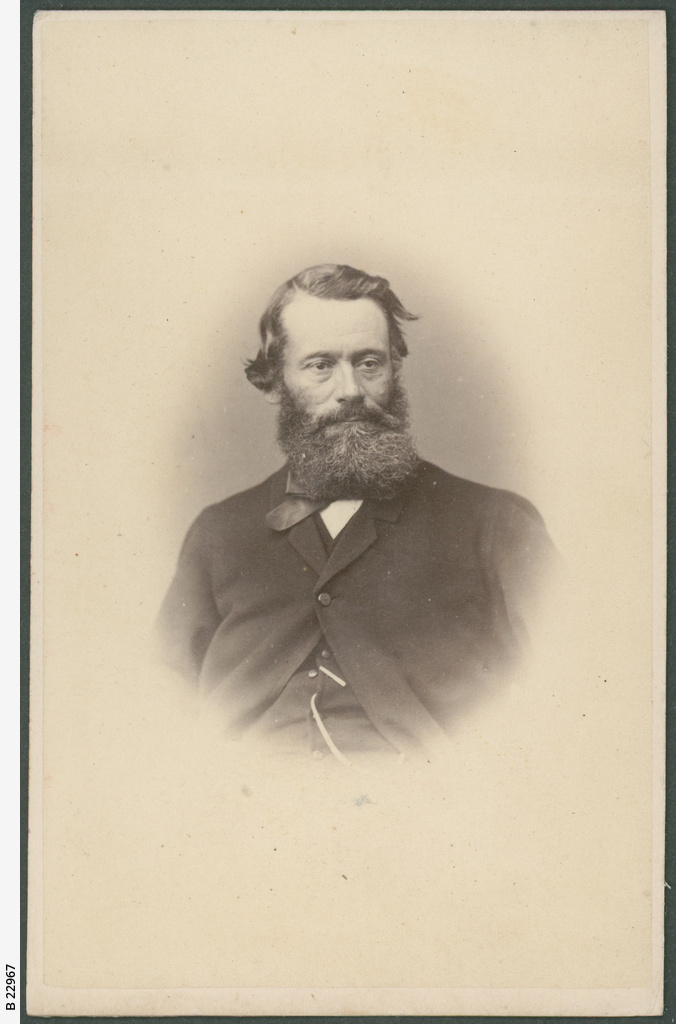
Henry Thomas Morris, c. 1864.

Henry Thomas Morris (1823 – 20 October 1911) was an early pioneer in South Australia, arriving on HMS Buffalo with is uncle, Governor John Hindmarsh. During his tenure as Chief Inspector of Sheep he eradicated scab in South Australia and was later appointed manager at Anlaby Station. He was also a justice of the peace.

== Early life ==
Morris was born in 1823 at Gravesend, England. He came to South Australia in 1836 with his uncle, Governor John Hindmarsh, making him a member of the First Fleet of South Australia. He was present at the declaration of the colony.

While living with his vice-regal uncle, Morris attended school under the tutelage of Rev. Thomas Q. Stow.

In 1849, while in the south-east, Morris and Harry Valette Jones were charged with feloniously shooting at and wounding, with intent to murder Malappa, an aboriginal native, at Yorke's Peninsula, on the 15th August. However, they were later acquitted of the charge South Australian Gazette and Mining Journal (20 September 1849)

He took up pastoral pursuits at Encounter Bay and Guichen Bay in the south-east and later went to the Californian gold diggings, returning to Australia in 1850. South Australian Gazette and Mining Journal (20 September 1849)

== Later life ==
On returning to South Australia in 1852, Morris found Adelaide nearly empty, mostly everybody having gone to the Victorian gold rush that was then at its height. He also joined in search of the precious metal, and with two mates travelled overland with a team of bullocks. They spent six or eight months on the fields and when they returned, they had done well enough to divide £700 apiece. After returning from the Victorian Goldfields, he was appointed a Government Sheep Inspector, and subsequently Chief Inspector.

Morris played a major role in the eradication of scab and by the mid-1860s, the disease was restricted to odd properties on the Victorian border. In 1863 he was given a purse of 600 sovereigns and a gold watch subscribed to by 82 Landowners at a complimentary dinner at the Pier Hotel. In addition to his duties as Chief Inspector Morris was, in 1860, given the task of assessing the carrying capacity of the northern runs under the Stock Act. This work took him 13 months to complete and took him eventually to all parts of the colony, visiting over 500 properties.

Morris was succeeded as Chief Inspector of Sheep in 1865, when he became manager of Anlaby Station, owned by Frederick Dutton. Morris succeeded Alexander Buchanan as manager at Anlaby and remained there until 1890, before retiring in Kapunda. On 1 June 1865, Morris was appointed a justice of the peace.

Morris supported a number of local organisations, including the Kapunda Rifle Club, Kapunda and Light Agricultural Society, and a number of sporting and athletic clubs. He also served on the Kapunda School Board, Central Road Board, Midland Road Board, and on the Julia District Council. As manager of Anlaby, he recommended the hospital and recreation ground movements to his employer, Frederick Dutton, and the £3000 cheque which came in response to that recommendation was the means of securing the establishment of the Kapunda Hospital and Dutton Recreation Park.

He died on 20 October 1911 at his Kapunda home, Oak Lodge.

== Family ==
Henry Thomas Morris married Elizabeth Lee on 3 February 1853 in Adelaide. Elizabeth arrived in South Australia in December 1839 on board the ship the "Moffat." They had four children:

- Letitia Rebecca Morris (1856 - ????)
- Henry Thomas Hindmarsh Morris (1857–1936)
- William Owen Hindmarsh Morris (1858–1946)
- Herbert Alfred Hindmarsh Morris (1861–1951)

On 15 June 1895, Morris married Bessie Osborne (???? - , St. Paul's Church, Port Adelaide, the service being officiated by the Rev. F. W. Barnwell. Bessie Osborne was the second daughter of Stephen Osborne, J.P., former manager of the Kapunda and Mutooroo mines. Henry and Bessie had one child:

- Bessie Lee Hindmarsh "Queenie" Morris (1897 - ?)
  - On the 18th February 1925, Queenie married Charles Keith Benbow Scott at Parkside.
