= Hampden Dutton =

- Born: William Hampden Dutton c. 29 October 1807; Colne, Lancashire, England
- Died: 21 November 1849 (aged 41–42); Melbourne, Colony of New South Wales
- Occupations: pastoralist in New South Wales and South Australia
- Spouse: Charlotte da Silva Cameron (1813–1885)
- Children: Mary Anne Elizabeth Taylor (1832–), Luduvina Charlotte Jane Moore (1833–1868), Mary Broughton Rebecca Emma Dutton (ca. 1837–1896), William Broughton Dutton (1838–1863), Charles George Cameron Dutton (1842–1887), Henry Dutton (1844–1914), Zelie Adele Dutton (1846–1909), Ewin Cameron Dutton (1848–1864)
- Parent(s): Frederick Hugh Hampden Dutton (formerly Mendes) and Mary Ann (née Norris)
- Relatives: Frederick Hansborough Dutton (brother), Robert Waters Moore (son-in-law), Henry Hampden Dutton (grandson), Geoffrey Piers Henry Dutton (great-grandson), Charles Cameron (father-in-law), John Finnis (Charlotte's step-father)

William Hampden Dutton (29 October 1807 – 21 November 1849), generally known as Hampden Dutton, was a pioneering pastoralist in New South Wales and South Australia.

== History ==
Hampden was the eldest child of Frederick Hugh Hampden Dutton and his wife Mary Ann Dutton, née Norris. His father, whose surname was originally Mendes, was from 1814 to 1832 British consul at Cuxhaven, Hanover. Hampden studied agricultural science in Germany from around 1822 to 1824, specialising in wool classing and sheep breeding.

He was employed by the Australian Agricultural Company in 1825 to select a flock and arrived in Sydney on 22 March 1826 with a selection of around 240 sheep, though many were in poor condition and so many died subsequently that Hampden's contract was terminated. He returned to England in 1827.

In 1830 Hampden and his brother Frederick Hansborough Dutton returned to Sydney. Frederick moved to Mullengandra near Albury (and later famously took up 70,000 acres (28,000 ha) in South Australia which he called Anlaby), while Hampden had extensive properties in Monaro region of New South Wales (then generally spelled "Manaro"). He was appointed Magistrate at Yass in 1834, Justice of the Peace in Sydney..

On 26 December 1838, Hampden, his wife Charlotte, and three children arrived in South Australia from Sydney aboard the ship Parland, which also carried for him a full cargo of 1,500 sheep and a number of horses. He was in 1839, with fellow Sydney pastoralists Moore and Duncan Macfarlane, granted a selection of 4,000 acres (1,600 ha) from South Australia's first Special Survey of 15,000 acres (6,100 ha) of land in South Australia, near Mount Barker (part being J. B. Hack's station); He shortly returned to Sydney. He, Macfarlane, and Capt. John Finnis, who were by then the three partners, organised three overland sheep drives from Sydney to Adelaide over the next few years.

He was consul or vice-consul at Sydney for Hanse Towns from 1840 to 1842, then was declared insolvent, and his business affairs were put in the hands of his brother Frederick, who paid out all creditors in full.

He died four years later in Melbourne, Victoria. His eldest son William Broughton Dutton died in North Adelaide in 1863; his widow sold by auction some 64 blocks in the township of Mount Barker in 1866, and the family either returned to, or had remained in South Australia, later living at Strangways Terrace, North Adelaide..

Both Hampden Road and Dutton Place in Mount Barker are named after him.

== Family ==
William Hampden Dutton married Charlotte da Silva Cameron (1813 – 11 May 1885) on 2 July 1831. Charlotte was a daughter of Charles Cameron and stepdaughter of Captain John Finnis (1802–1872). Their children included:

- Mary Anne Elizabeth Dutton (25 April 1832 in Raby, also reported as Cobbitty, New South Wales – ) married John Taylor on 13 August 1857
- Luduvina (often written Luduvine, Ludivine) Charlotte Jane Dutton (1833 in Sydney – 14 May 1868) married Robert Waters Moore M.R.C.S. (1819 – 6 December 1884) on 3 December 1851. Dr. Moore was the Colonial Surgeon.
- Mary Broughton Rebecca Emma Dutton (b.1837 in Sydney – 21 May 1896)
- William Broughton Dutton (1838 in Sydney – 27 June 1863 at North Adelaide)
- Charles George Cameron Dutton (1842 at Merri Creek, Vic – 14 July 1887 at Adelaide)
- Henry Dutton (1844 at Melbourne – 25 August 1914 at Anlaby) married Helen Elizabeth Thomas (ca.1844 – 8 October 1901) on 10 May 1873. He inherited Anlaby Station from his uncle Frederick Hansborough Dutton.

- Ethel da Silva Dutton (3 February 1876 – 8 February 1892) died after fall from rocks, Granite Island
- Henry Hampden Dutton (13 February 1879 – 15 June 1932) inherited 'Anlaby' in 1914. He married Emily Martin, daughter of John Felix Martin of Gawler on 29 November 1905; their children included:

- John Hansborough Dutton (23 August 1906 – 1989)
- Richard Hampden Dutton (6 August 1909 – ) married to Margaret Elizabeth Newland on 25 February 1933
- Bryony Helen Dutton (22 October 1918 – 2005) was engaged to William Weatherly in 1940 but married Professor Richard Blackburn on 1 December 1951.
- Geoffrey Piers Henry Dutton (2 August 1922 – 17 September 1998), noted writer, grew up at "Anlaby"

- Zelie Adelaide Dutton (1846 in Melbourne – 12 Nov 1909 at North Adelaide)
- Ewin Cameron Dutton (1848 – 26 October 1864 at Glenelg)
