= Julian Barbara Waugh =

(1857–1938) political and community worker

Julian Barbara Waugh MBE
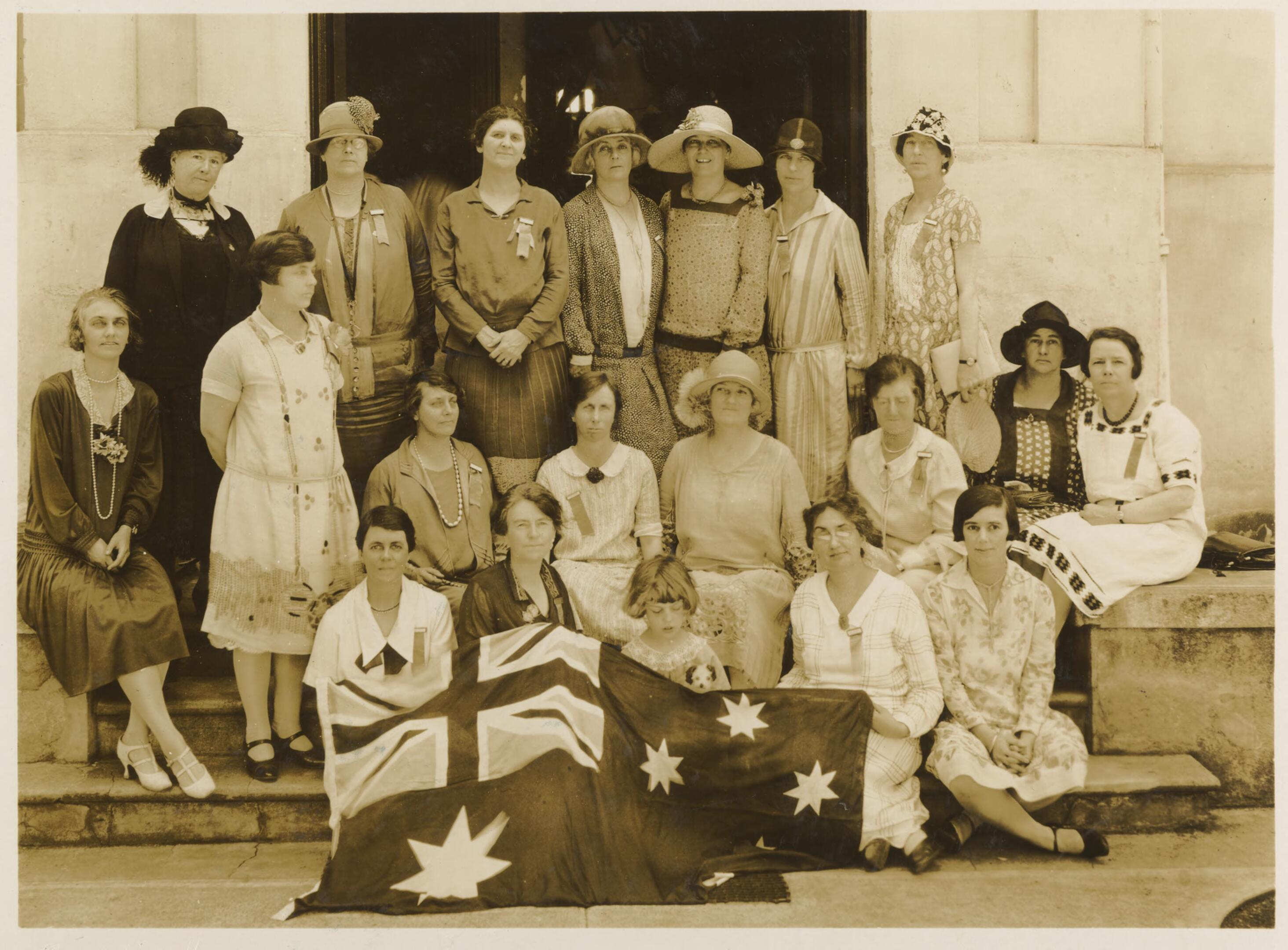
- Mrs Julian Barbara Waugh c.1930
- Born: Julianna Barbara Cameron; 9 June 1857; Balmain, New South Wales, Australia
- Died: 2 January 1938 (aged 80); Mosman, New South Wales, Australia
- Other name: Mrs John Waugh
- Occupation: Community worker
- Spouse: John Waugh
- Children: two

Julian Barbara Waugh MBE (née Cameron; 9 June 1857 – 2 January 1938) was an Australian political and community worker. She became the mayoress of Parramatta in 1909 when her husband was mayor. She was an enthusiastic supporter of the First World War and Australia's contribution of conscripted soldiers.

== Life ==
Waugh was born in 1857 in the Sydney suburb of Balmain. Her parents were Sophia Usher (née Nail) and Ewen Wallace Cameron. Her parents had been born in Mauritius and France respectively. Her father was a merchant and had tried to enter parliament but he was narrowly beaten. She spent part of her childhood in France.

In 1879 she married John Waugh, who became a bank manager. They had two children. They lived in Parramatta and she became president in the local croquet club. Her husband became an alderman in Parramatta in 1904, and in 1909–10 he became the Mayor, so she became the Lady Mayoress.

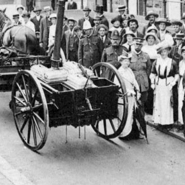
Mrs John Waugh presents a travelling kitchen in 1914

She became the President of the Travelling Kitchen Fund in New South Wales. Seven kitchens were funded by the group. In December 1914 she presented one to Lieutenant Colonel Cox CB outside Sydney Town Hall.

She was a strong supporter of the war effort and she encouraged Australians to agree to conscription.

In 1928 the Pan Pacific and Southeast Asia Women's Association organised its first conference in Hawaii and Waugh was a delegate.

She became a Member of the Most Excellent Order of the British Empire in 1934. Waugh died in the Sydney suburb of Mosman in 1938.
