= George Bennett (naturalist) =

English-born Australian physician and naturalist

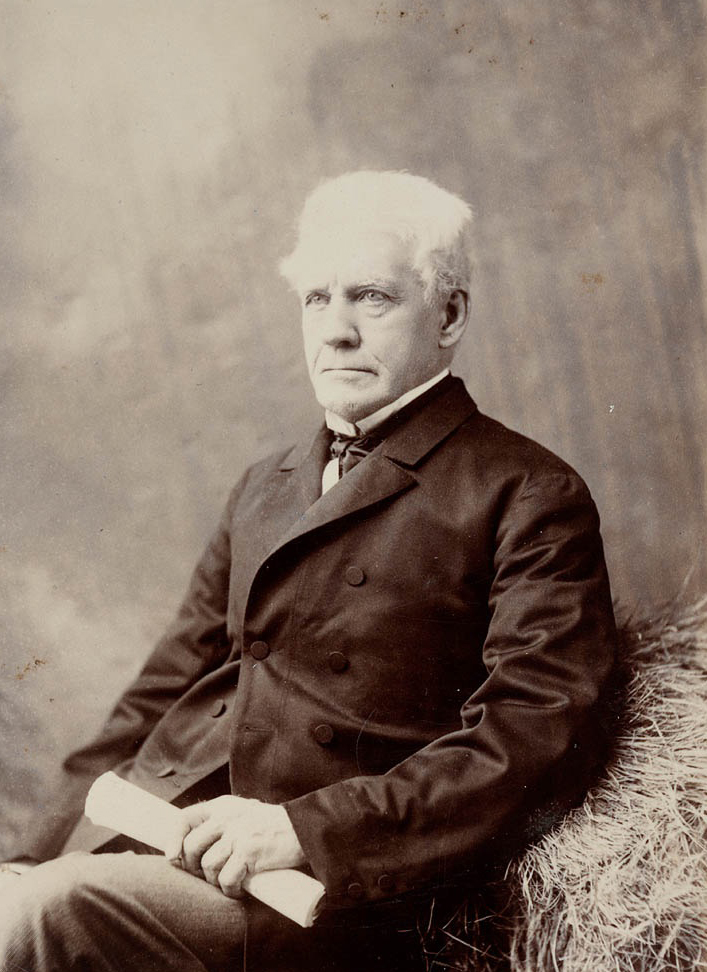
- Bennett in c. 1880
- Born: 31 January 1804; Plymouth, England
- Died: 29 September 1893 (aged 89); Sydney, Australia
- Occupations: Physician, naturalist
- Known for: Casuarius bennettii, Dendrolagus bennettianus, Myrrophis bennetti

George Bennett FRCS FLS FZS (31 January 1804 – 29 September 1893) was an English-born Australian physician and naturalist, winner of the Clarke Medal in 1890.

== Early life ==
Bennett was born at Plymouth, England. On leaving school at 15 years of age he visited Ceylon and on his return studied for the medical profession, initially at Plymouth, later at the Middlesex Hospital and the Hunterian School of Medicine. He obtained the degree of M.R.C.S. on 7 March 1828, and later became F.R.C.S.

== Career ==
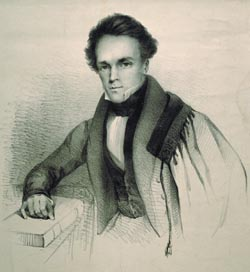
Portrait of Dr George Bennett

In 1833, Bennett lent support in absentia to the founding of what became the Royal Entomological Society of London. Bennett was awarded the honorary gold medal of the Royal College of Surgeons in recognition of his contributions to zoological science.

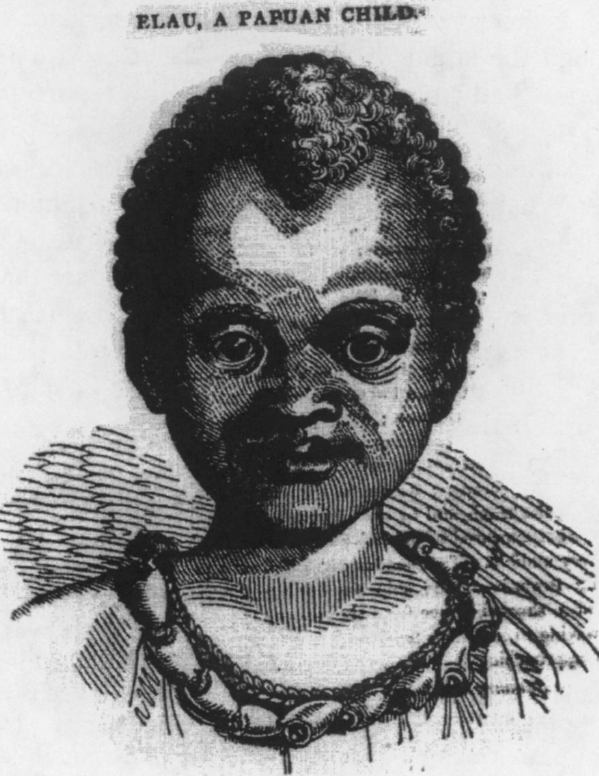
Portrait of Elau

== Elau and the gibbon ==
In addition to the nautilus, Bennett took a Sumatran gibbon specimen to England as well as a young Erromangan girl named Elau, who was the first person from the New Hebrides to visit Europe. All died swiftly, with Elau surviving 4 years until the age of 10 before dying of tuberculosis. Bennett had Elau and the ape dissected. His method of acquisition of Elau is unclear, but his intentions were to 'civilise' her in an effort to investigate the nature of 'goodness' and investigate his and his peers' theories that were based in scientific racism.

== Late life and legacy ==
Bennett was 84 years of age when he contributed the chapter on "Mammals" to the Handbook of Sydney. Bennett died in Sydney on 29 September 1893.

Bennett is commemorated in the scientific names of the dwarf cassowary (Casuarius bennettii), Bennett's tree-kangaroo (Dendrolagus bennettianus), Bennett's two-pored dragon (Diporiphora bennettii), Bennett's water snake (Myrrophis bennetti), and the beetle Eupholus bennetti.

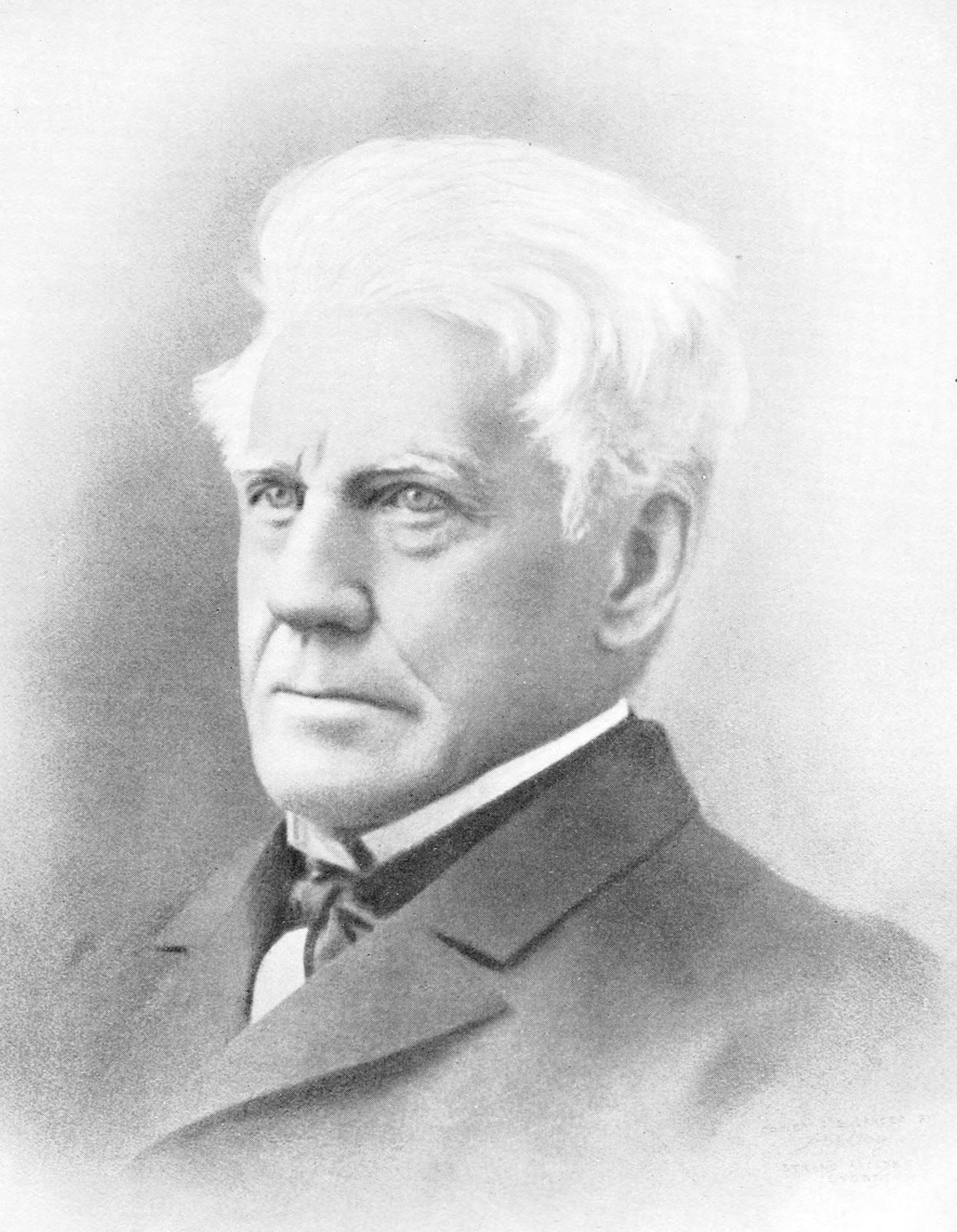
George Bennett in late life

He left a large library of books on Australiana that was purchased by William Dymock.

== Family ==
Bennett married three times: on 28 November 1835 to Julia Anne Ludovina Cameron (c. 1820 – 15 June 1846), daughter of Charles Cameron and step-daughter of John Finnis. She took her own life by taking prussic acid. They had two sons and three daughters. He married Charlotte James Elliott (c. 1817 – 20 February 1853) on 10 December 1846; they had one son. He married Sarah Jane Adcock on 4 January 1854; their two children died as infants.

== Works authored ==
- Wanderings in New South Wales, Batavia, Pedir Coast, Singapore and China: being the journal of a naturalist in those countries, during 1832, 1833 and 1834 (Vol. 1). London: Richard Bentley, University of Hong Kong Libraries, Digital Initiatives, China Through Western Eyes. 1834. Archived from the original on 25 March 2016.
- Wanderings in New South Wales, Batavia, Pedir Coast, Singapore and China: being the journal of a naturalist in those countries, during 1832, 1833 and 1834 (Vol. 2). London: Richard Bentley, University of Hong Kong Libraries, Digital Initiatives, China Through Western Eyes. 1834. Archived from the original on 26 August 2016.
- Gatherings of a naturalist in Australasia : being observations principally on the animal and vegetable productions of New South Wales, New Zealand, and some of the Austral Islands. 1860.
- Acclimatisation: its eminent adaptation to Australia (1 ed.). Melbourne: Acclimatisation Society of Victoria. 1862.

Awards
Preceded by Robert L. J. Ellery	Clarke Medal; 1890	Succeeded by Frederick Hutton
