= Alexander Buchanan (stockman) =

Pioneer in South Australia (1810–1865)

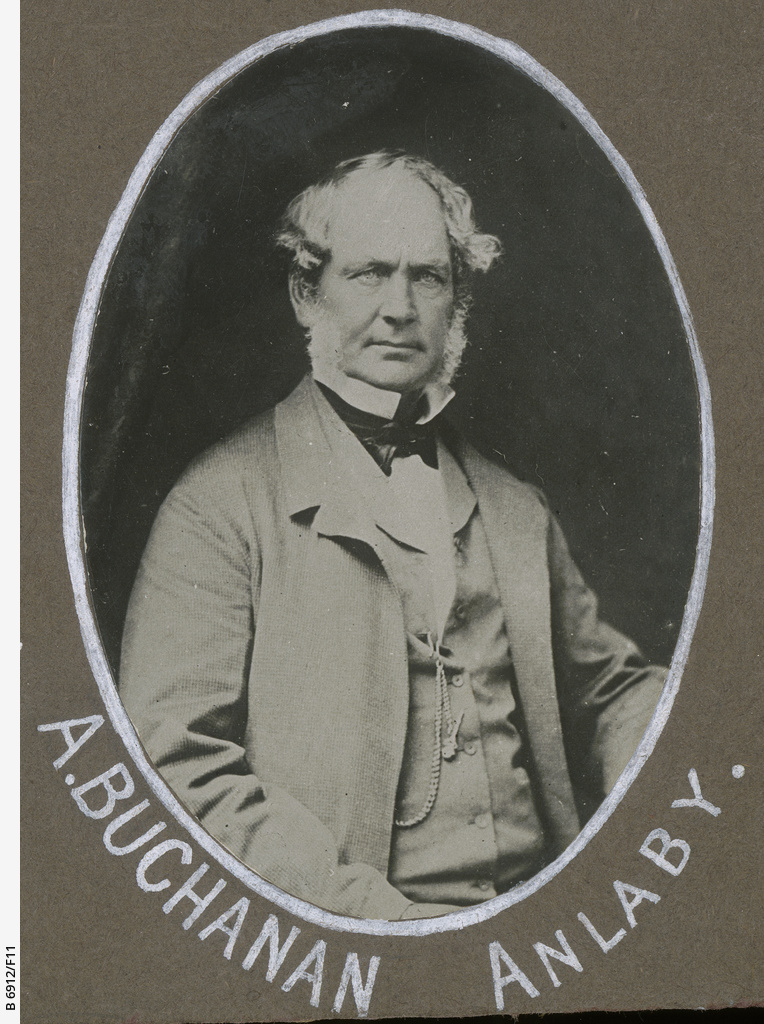
Alexander Buchanan (c.1808-1865)

Alexander Buchanan (3 November 1810 – 21 May 1865) was an early pioneer in South Australia, responsible for bringing sheep overland from NSW, most notably for pastoralist, Frederick Dutton. He later served as manager at Anlaby Station. He was also a Justice of the Peace.

== Early life ==
Buchanan was born in Glasgow, Scotland, the son of Jean Logan and Alexander Buchanan, a coffee plantation owner with interests in Newport and St. Mary, Jamaica.

His parents returned to Jamaica soon after his birth, leaving Alexander in Scotland. He attended Glasgow High School and Glasgow College. He gained commercial experience in Glasgow and Manchester before moving to Canada.

In 1832, Buchanan relocated to Toronto, Canada, to establish a mercantile and importing business with his half brother. It was reputedly the first business to import from the UK directly to Toronto. On account of finding the business uncongenial, he returned to Scotland in 1838 and shortly after sailed from the port of Greenock, Scotland, for Adelaide, South Australia aboard the Welcome which arrived 3 April 1839.

== Career ==
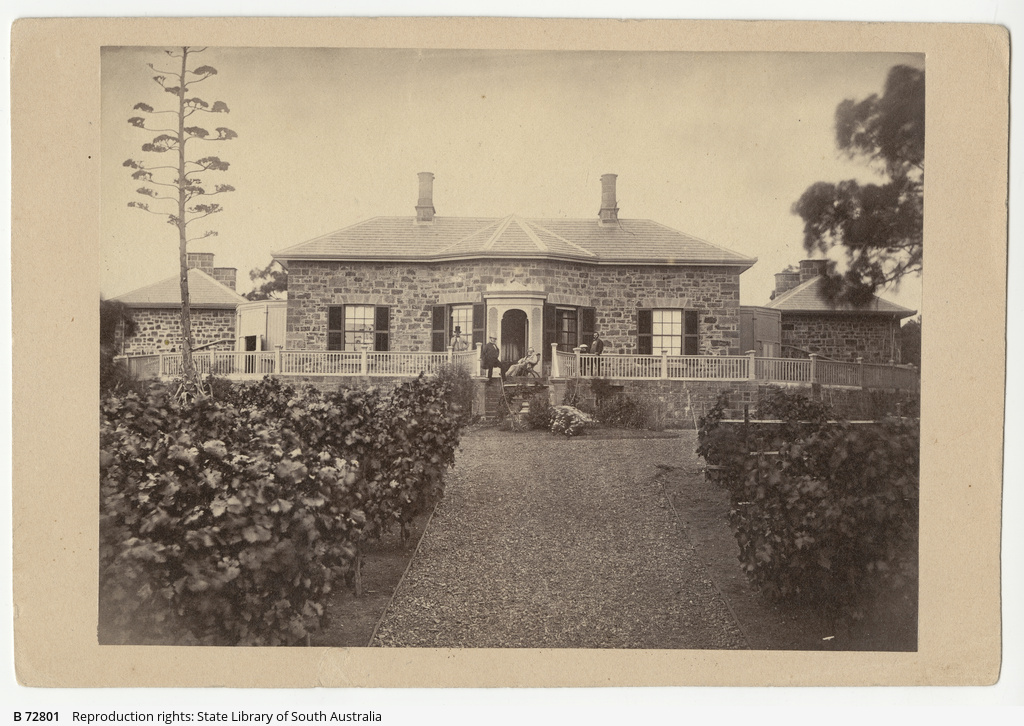
Anlaby Station Homestead, c. 1872.

On 3 June 1839, two months after arriving in Adelaide, Buchanan boarded the Resource, bound for Sydney. He was part of a company of eight young men, consisting of William Sharples, Alexander Buchanan, James Turner, R. P. Cunningham, Edward Spicer, a Mr Coutts, a Mr Deas, and a Mr Edgar.

The young men, Buchanan included, sought to purchase sheep in New South Wales and walk them overland to South Australia as a speculation. The number of sheep obtained numbered around 13,000. To improve the viability of the endeavour, the young men also drove a flock of sheep, numbering 5,000, on behalf of Frederick Dutton, taking the total flock to 18,000.

The group left Sydney on 11 July 1839. They reached Liverpool - which Buchanan described as a 'very nice little village' - the following day, and Campbelltown on 13 July. Berrima was reached on 16 July, Goulburn on 19 July, and Yass on 26 July.

Near Yass, the party came upon the Murrumbidgee River, which remained a constant water source. The sheep crossed the Lachlan River on 15 October, before deviating northward. Buchanan missed the meeting of the Murrumbidgee and Murray rivers, instead joining the Murray near its intersection with the Darling River in early November. The sheep and men passed Lake Victoria on 23 November and Lake Bonney nearly a week later.

On 9 December 1839, Buchanan left the main group to ride ahead. He encountered a surveying team that had departed Adelaide only ten days prior. The surveyors explained Governor George Gawler and Captain Charles Sturt were sailing upriver from Lake Alexandrina. Buchanan changed course to meet them. After meeting them, he relayed information regarding conditions upstream, particularly the behaviour of Aboriginals, and provided them with some provisions.

Buchanan rode to a squatting station formerly occupied by Edward John Eyre. The site is described as being in the River Light Valley; possibly where modern-day Anlaby sits. Buchanan referred to the area as a 'gentleman's park...fine plains and thinly studded with trees.' He said it was exceedingly better than Kilkerran Park (a possible reference to Kilkerran House in Ayrshire) and Eaton Hall, the residence of the Earl of Grosvenor.

Buchanan engaged in other ventures for two years before entering Frederick Dutton's employ at Anlaby in 1842. His work consisted of managing the sales of sheep, shearing, and overseeing the shepherds responsible for looking after Dutton's growing flocks.

Frederick Dutton left for England in 1853, leaving the management of Anlaby Station to Buchanan. He improved sheep husbandry, breeding, and the condition of the land; efforts which were lauded by other colonists.

On 5 July 1858, Buchanan was appointed Justice of the Peace by command of the Governor of South Australia, Sir Richard Graves McDonnell. His appointment obliged him to serve as Magistrate at the Kapunda Police Court during the Rainbird Murders hearings in March 1861.

== Death and funeral ==
Buchanan died on 21 May 1865, at Anlaby Station.

His health had been poor for the last two years of his life. He succumbed to low fever, ascribed to overexertion at recent local land sales.

He was buried at the Kapunda Public Cemetery on 23 May. The funeral procession left Anlaby at 10am, followed by a long cortege of horse-drawn vehicles. The hearse was followed by Francis Stacker Dutton (brother of Frederick Dutton), Mr Jaffrey, Peter Miller (a trusted servant), and a son of Alexander Buchanan. The funeral service was held at Christ Church, Kapunda, led by The Rev. T. Sabine. Every shop and store in the town was closed as a sign of respect.

== Family ==
Buchanan married Penelope Anne Haddrick (1819–1854) on 22 January 1848. Two of five children survived:

- Alexander Buchanan (1 November 1848 – 11 January 1939); went on to become a Master of the Supreme Court of South Australia and Puisne Judge.
- John (Jack) Bryce Buchanan (1853–1939); married Dolly Mena Mordant. He died in Swaziland.

Following the death of his first wife, Buchanan married Cecilia Haddrick (1828–1903) on 9 April 1857. Two of four children survived:

- Frederick Dutton Buchanan (1859–1900); married Alice Edna Rickitts. Died in Natal, South Africa.
- Penelope Anne Buchanan (1862–1935); married William St Clare White on 29 April 1886. Died in Cottesloe, Western Australia.

== Legacy ==
The South Australian rural locality of Buchanan, located west of Eudunda and south of Hampden, was named in his honour. Lake Buchanan (27.647962805465056°S 139.5657835989284°E), also known as Cudye-cudyena, was also named in his honour.

Following his death, Buchanan's name continued to be held in high regard. Half a century after his death, one of his surviving contemporaries commented, "in the North his name was a household word".
