= Charles Cameron (army officer) =

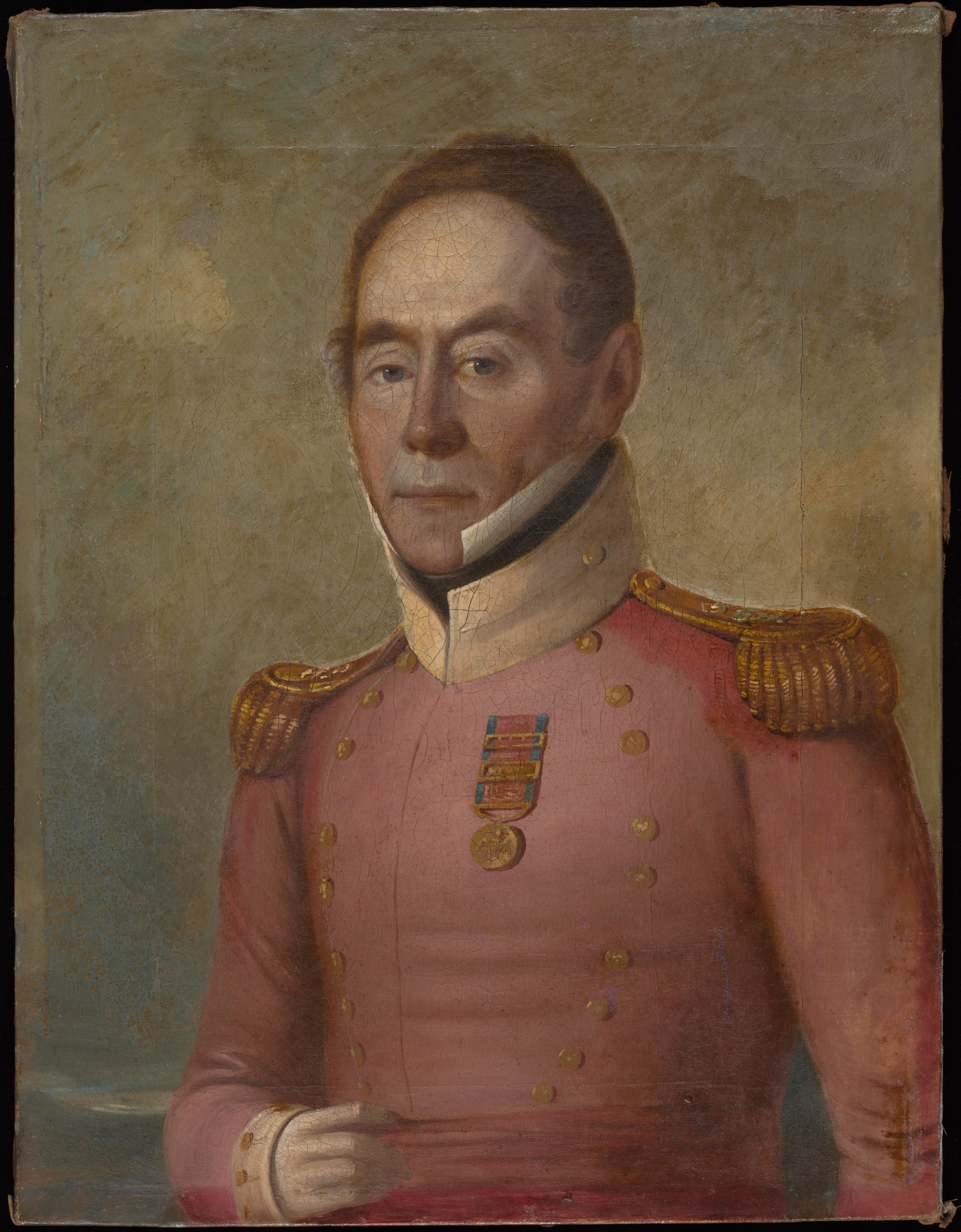
- Portrait by Augustus Earle, c. 1825
- Born: 26 July 1779; Driminasalie, Kilmallie, Inverness-shire, Scotland
- Died: 14 May 1827 (aged 47); Chinsurah near Kolkata, Bengal Presidency, India
- Spouses: Mary MacDonnell; Luduvina Rosa Da Silva
- Children: Charlotte Da Silva Cameron (1813–1885), Charles Berry Cameron (1814–1828), Ewen Wallace Cameron (1816–1876), Julia Anne Luduvina Da Silva Cameron (1818–1846), Donald Anderson Cameron (1823– ), Ludovina Catherina De Silva Cameron (1824–1851), Anne Slade Cameron (1826–1834)
- Parent(s): Donald Cameron and Catherine
- Relatives: father-in-law of George Strickland Kingston, William Hampden Dutton
- Military career
- Rank: Lieutenant-colonel
- Units: 92nd Regiment, 3rd Regiment

Charles Cameron (26 July 1779 – 14 May 1827) was a Scots born soldier. Through his children he is linked with a number of political and other people influential in Australian history.

== Military career ==
Initially serving as a volunteer, he was commissioned an ensign and lieutenant in the 92nd Regiment in 1799, later joining the 3rd Regiment, promoted captain in 1804, major in 1813 and lieutenant-colonel in 1819.

From 14 December 1822, Cameron was appointed commandant of Port Dalrymple, serving from 1 February 1823 – 6 April 1825.

== Family ==
Cameron was the son of Donald and Catherine Cameron. He married Charlotte Euphemia Cameron (1779–1803) in 1800, Mary MacDonnell in 1807 and after her death Luduvina Rosa Da Silva in Portugal in 1812.

After his death, Luduvina married Captain John Finnis in 1832 in Sydney.

The children of Charles and Luduvina included:

- Charlotte (1813-1885) married William Hampden Dutton (Sydney 1831)
- Julia Anne Ludovina (c. 1820 - 1846) married Dr George Bennett of Sydney
- Ewen Wallace Cameron (1816-1876) married Sophia Usher Nail from Mauritius
- Luduvina (1824-1851) married (Sir) George Strickland Kingston (1841)
