= Anlaby Station =

Pastoral lease in South Australia

Coordinates: 34.2182°S 138.9659°E

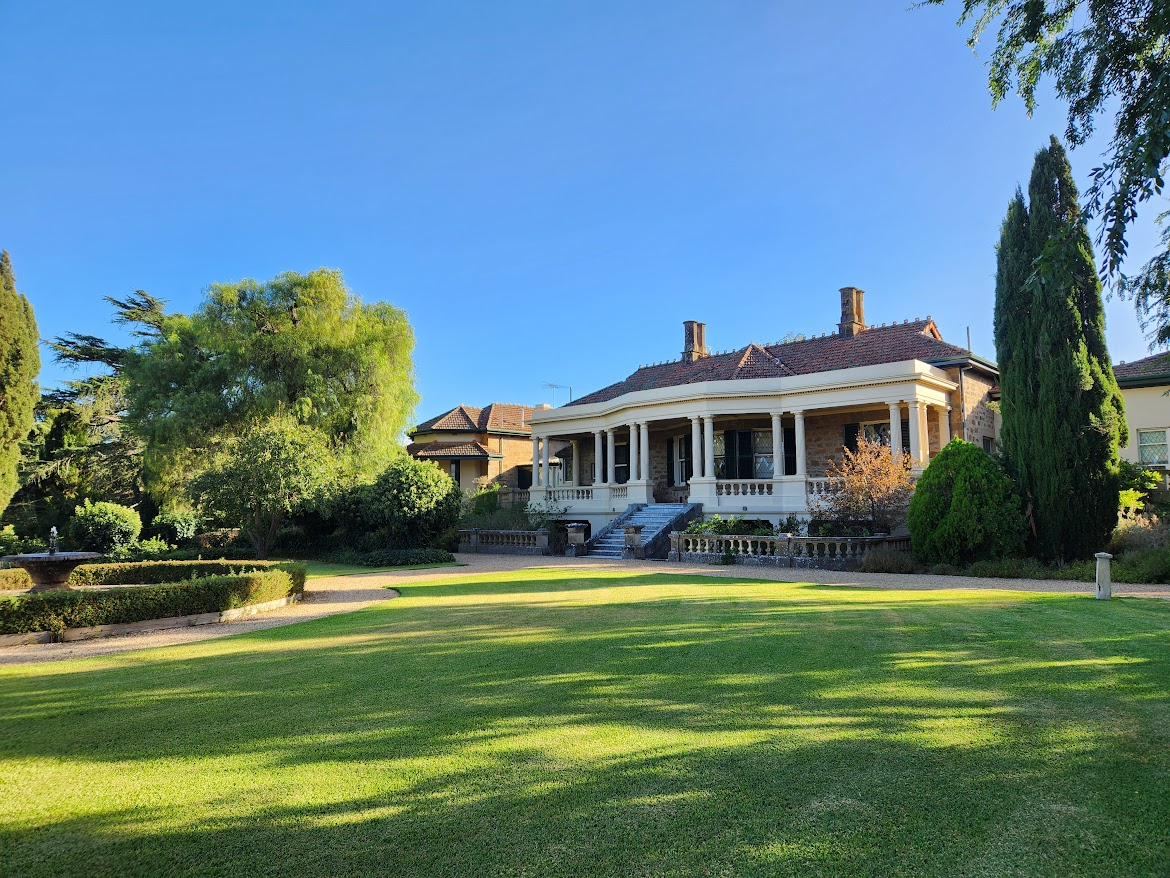
Anlaby Homestead.

Location in South Australia

Anlaby or Anlaby Station is a historic heritage tourism destination located about 12 kilometres (7 miles) southeast of Marrabel and 14 kilometres (9 miles) north of Kapunda in South Australia. The property was originally established in 1839 by Frederick Dutton, and is home to the oldest Merino stud in South Australia and the second-oldest in Australia. Anlaby features a significant collection of heritage buildings on the South Australian Heritage Register, extensive gardens covering 10 acres, and continues to operate as a working farm.

== History ==
The locality was first explored by Europeans in March 1838 by the party of Hill, Wood, Willis, and Oakden, who were scouting an overlanding route from the Murray.

The station is the oldest merino stud in South Australia and was settled in 1839 by Capt. John Finnis, who called it "Mount Dispersion" (the Aboriginal name was Pudna), and stocked it with 12,000 sheep. The property was acquired in 1841 by Frederick Dutton, at which time it was at the frontier of European settlement. In the early days Anlaby extended from near Kapunda to Tothill's Creek occupying an area of 160,000 acres (64,750 ha) with a length of 25 miles (40 km) and a width of 10 miles (16 km). The neighbouring pastoralist to the west and north was W. S. Peter, while to the south was Bagot's Koonunga. To the east was the Murray scrub. A two-man mounted police station was established at Julia Creek between 1842 and 1846 to protect the Anlaby and Koonunga flocks from attacks by local Aboriginal people. The property ran as many as 70,000 sheep and shearing lasted nine months, employing 70 people.

In 1843 a log hut was constructed for the manager Alexander Buchanan. The name of the run was also changed by Dutton to Anlaby, the name of the Yorkshire village that his sister's husband hailed from. By 1851 the property had been reduced to 70,000 acres (28,328 ha), with the loss of another 24,000 acres (9,712 ha) so that closer settlement could be made. The homestead, comprising three interconnected wings, was constructed in 1861 for Alexander Buchanan.

Explorer John McKinlay stopped at Anlaby in August 1861 on the way north as part of South Australian Burke Relief Expedition. McKinlay later wrote, "this party met with the utmost kindness and consideration" from Alexander Buchanan, manager at Anlaby.

Another 30,000 acres (12,141 ha) from Anlaby was subdivided for wheat farming up until 1917. Returned servicemen were allocated another 8,000 acres (3,237 ha) between 1918 and 1922 in the Soldiers Settlement Scheme.

Frederick Dutton died in 1890 and left Anlaby to his nephew Henry Dutton, who was responsible for making significant extensions to the house and gardens. Notably, Henry ordered an enormous conservatory be built in the gardens by A. Simpson & Son of Adelaide in 1891.

Henry's son, Henry Hampden Dutton (H.H. or "Harry"), inherited the property upon his death in 1914. Harry married the accomplished musician and socialite Emily Martin on 29 November 1905. Together they carried out extensive improvements at Anlaby, including the addition of a library in 1928, designed to hold the family's expanding collection of first edition books. A set of four oil paintings by Thomas Baines, who accompanied Augustus Gregory on his 1855 expedition to the Northern Territory, were acquired by Harry to hang above the library's fireplace. The library included complete sets such as James Cook's Voyages and John Gould's Mammals of Australia.

On Henry's death in 1932 Emily took over management of the station and the 1132 ewes she inherited.

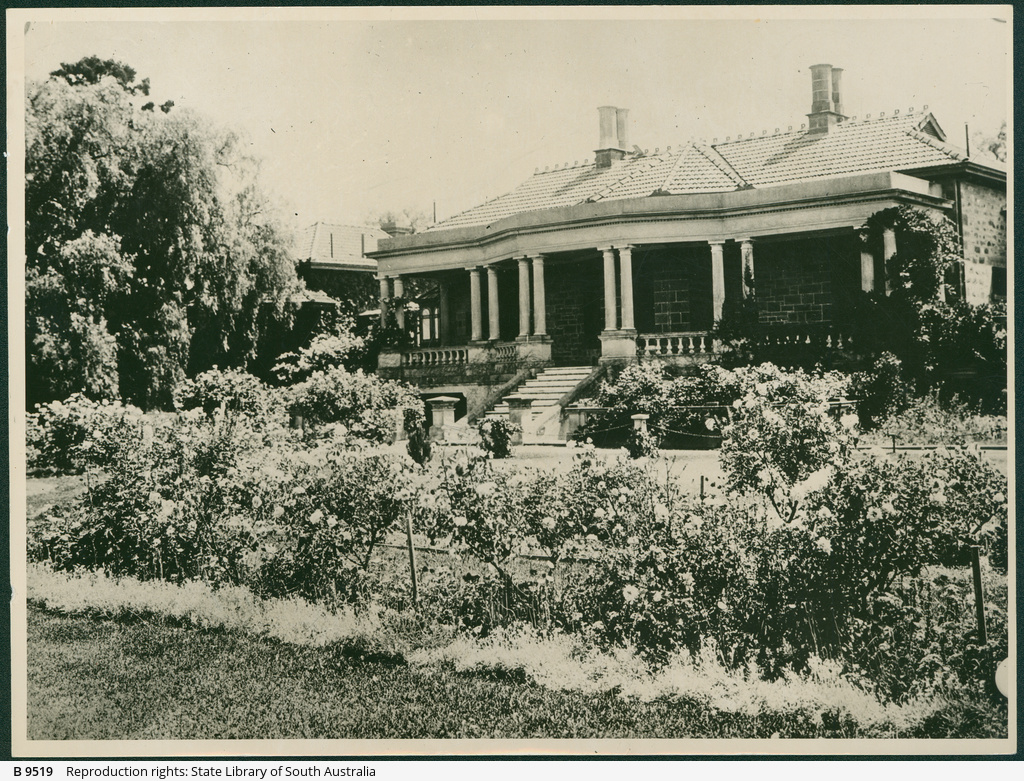
Façade of Anlaby Homestead, near Kapunda, South Australia, c. 1936

Miles Franklin, describing the exotic trees in the gardens close to the house and the distinct lack of Australian natives, said it was like a ring around the house to keep Australia out.

The Anlaby Pastoral Company was formed in 1957 and took over control of the property. Partners were Emily Dutton (manager), John H. Dutton, Geoffrey P. Dutton, Helen Blackburn and Leonie Dutton. On 1 December 1967 the stud and property, excepting 500 acres around the main homestead, were sold at auction. The Merino stud and large parts of the property, including the Woolshed, were acquired by the Mosey family. The homestead was retained by Geoffrey Dutton.

In 2004, Andrew Morphett and Peter Hayward acquired the homestead. The homestead, outbuildings, and extensive gardens have been restored. In early 2009 Andrew Morphett acquired the Anlaby Stud.

== Managers ==
Anlaby Station was managed by a succession of individuals when the property was owned by the Dutton family. The managers were:

- Alexander Buchanan (3 November 1810 – 21 May 1865); served as manager from 1842 until his death in 1865. His son, Alexander Buchanan, became Master of the Supreme Court of South Australia.
- Henry Thomas Morris (21 November 1823 – 20 October 1911) a nephew of John Hindmarsh, and one of the original HMS Buffalo immigrants of 1836. Served as manager at Anlaby following Buchanan's death, until 1890. Originally served as a stock inspector.
- Peter Mayoh Miller; served as manager under Henry Dutton, between 1890, and his retirement on 1 November 1895.
- Claude de Neufville Lucas (3 Oct 1873 – 26 April 1936); assumed position of manager following Miller's resignation. Served between 1895 and 1932.
- Harry Edkins; manager until 1945. Prior to taking control of Anlaby, he managed Uno Station, Iron Knob, which was also owned by the Dutton family.
- Norman Bridle; manager from 1945.

== Heritage listing ==
Anlaby Homestead and the Anlaby Shearing Shed, Slaughterhouse, Shearers' Quarters and Manager's House are both separately listed on the South Australian Heritage Register.

=== Woolshed (Shearing Shed) ===
The first woolshed at Anlaby was constructed in the early years of the property, possibly in 1841. It was a wooden structure demolished in 1871 to make way for a new shed. The new stone shed, which measured 85ft by 46ft, was designed by William Gore. A German-born immigrant, Johann Friedrich Schramm, won the contract to build the shed, while the work was overseen by the Adelaide-based engineering firm, English & Rees. Manager, Henry Morris, placed £1 under the foundation stone on 11 July 1871, and the shed was completed in time for shearing on 15 September 1871. A short distance away, the Shearer's Kitchen was constructed by Kapunda-based plasterer and contractor, Peter McLaren, for accommodation and dining. In 1871, shearer's consumed the carcasses of eight to nine sheep, between 60 and 70 gallons of tea, and a large quantity of bread. A galvanised iron extension shed was added in 1904, and in 1906 mechanised shearing was undertaken for the first time.

== Heritage gardens ==
The 10-acre garden and arboretums at Anlaby contain the largest collection of National Trust registered heritage trees in one location under private ownership in Australia. There are 620 specimens, including Australian natives and exotic tree specimens from around the world.

Some of the most important heritage-listed planting include:

- Himalayan cedar (blue form) – Cedrus deodara
- Common pistachio – Pistacia vera (male)
- Siberian elm – Ulmus pumila var. pumila
- Cut-leaf Turkey-oak – Quercus cerris
- Pashia pear – Pyrus pashia
- Algerian oak – Quercus canariensis
- Rough-barked Arizona cypress – Hesperocyparis arizonica var. arizonica
- Common yellowwood – Afrocarpus falcatus
- Golden deodar cedar – Cedrus deodara 'Aurea'

Trees planted at Anlaby are listed at a local, regional, state, and national level.

== In literature ==
The prolific author Geoffrey Dutton grew up at Anlaby, and includes information about his ancestors in his 1985 book The Squatters.

== See also ==
- Dutton family of South Australia
- List of ranches and stations
