= Ewen Wallace Cameron =

French-born Australian businessman

Ewen Wallace Cameron (26 July 1816 – 25 May 1876) was a French-born Australian businessman.

He was the son of Lieutenant-Colonel Charles Cameron and Luduvina Rosa Da Silva, and migrated to New South Wales in 1822 with his family. He became a clerk, and was involved in early overlanding expeditions to South Australia. He made unsuccessful attempts to run land in New England and the Darling Downs, and also unsuccessfully went to the Californian Gold Rush. On his return he went into business with Thomas Mort, and became financial manager and then partner in 1856. He continued this partnership until 1866. On 7 October 1852 he married Sophia Usher Nail, with whom he had twelve children including Julian Barbara Waugh.

Cameron contested the seat of the Glebe at the 1859 colonial election, supporting free selection and very limited state aid to religion, but narrowly lost to the incumbent, John Campbell. He was actively involved in charitable organisations, including the Sydney Hospital and the Royal Prince Alfred Hospital. In 1868 he was elected president of the Balmain Working Men's Association, and was disturbed by growing union militancy. He was also active in the militia, joining the Balmain Rifles in 1861. He attained the rank of captain in 1868, and was also captain of the Sydney Battalion from 1869 to 1870. Cameron was also closely involved with the Anglican Church, and from 1875 was a member of the Royal Society of New South Wales. He died in Balmain in 1876.
