= Diporiphora bennettii =

Conservation status
- Least Concern (IUCN 3.1)

Scientific classification
- Kingdom: Animalia
- Phylum: Chordata
- Class: Reptilia
- Order: Squamata
- Suborder: Iguania
- Family: Agamidae
- Genus: Diporiphora
- Species: D. bennettii

Binomial name
- Diporiphora bennettii (Gray, 1845)

Synonyms
- Gindalia bennettii Gray, 1845; Diporophora bennettii — Boulenger, 1885; Diporiphora bennettii — Cogger, 1983

Species of lizard

Diporiphora bennettii, also known commonly as the Kimberley sandstone dragon or the robust two-line dragon, is a species of lizard in the family Agamidae. The species is endemic to Australia.

== Etymology ==
The specific name, bennettii, is in honor of Australian naturalist George Bennett.

== Geographic range ==
D. bennettii is found in Kimberley region, Western Australia state, Australia.

== Habitat ==
The preferred natural habitats of D. bennettii are forest and savanna.

== Description ==
D. bennettii may attain a snout-to-vent length (SVL) of 5.5 cm (2.2 in). The tail is less than twice SVL.

== Reproduction ==
D. bennettii is oviparous.
