= Alexander Buchanan (judge) =

Australian judge (1848–1930)

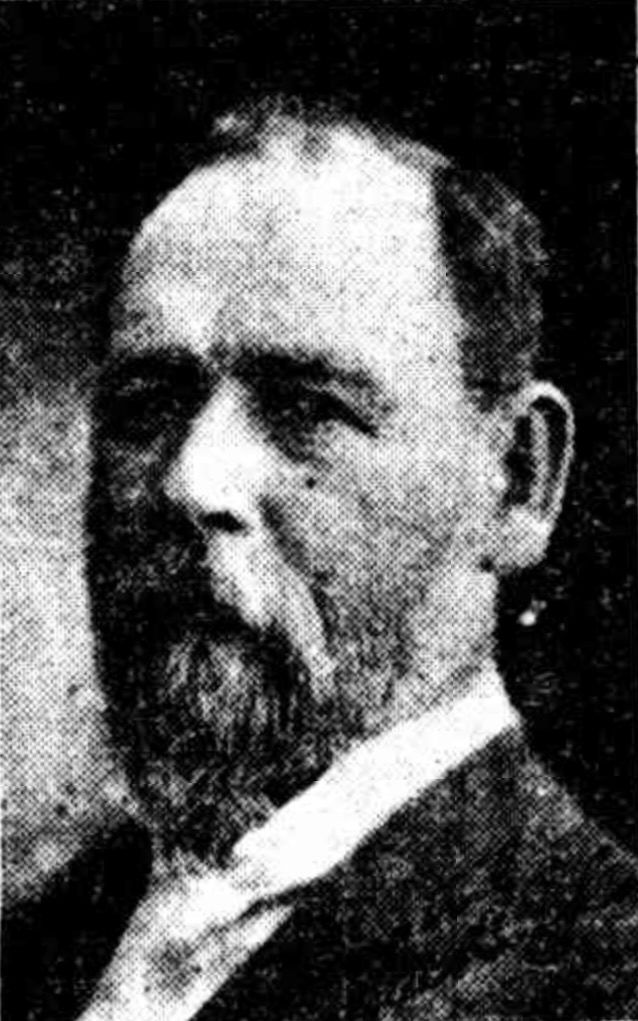
Alexander Buchanan, 1916

Alexander Buchanan (1 November 1848 – 11 January 1930) was Master of the Supreme Court of South Australia from 1891 to 1912 and puisne judge 1916–1921.

== Biography ==
Buchanan was born at Anlaby Station, near Kapunda, the eldest son of Celia Buchanan (died 27 November 1903) and Alexander Buchanan JP (c. 1808 – 21 May 1865), who came out to South Australia in 1839, was with a party of eight that drove 20,000 sheep overland from Sydney with William Sharples, James Turner, R. P. Cunningham, Edward Spicer, Coutts, Deas and Edgar and from around 1841 managed the station for Frederick Dutton.

Buchanan was educated at St Peter's College, Adelaide, at Hofwyl (now Hofwil), Switzerland, and Glasgow University.

On his return in 1870 he spent two years prospecting in the Northern Territory. He entered the auctioneering and stockbroking business in partnership with John W. Gleeson, of Clare as Gleeson & Buchanan 1877–1878.

=== Law ===
Buchanan by David Low

In 1879 Buchanan began to pursue a legal career. He served his papers with Bright of Clare, and was admitted to the Bar in 1884, and was taken on as an associate, later partner, in the office of the Charles Mann, and when Mann died he joined with E. A. Thornton. In August 1891, he was appointed special magistrate for the State and stipendiary magistrate at Port Adelaide. A month later, following the death of W. D. Scott, he was appointed Master of the Supreme Court, which carried with it the duties of Registrar of Probates, Companies, Trade Unions, Industrial and Provident Societies, Registrar in Admiralty, Registrar of the State Board of Conciliation, and District Registrar of the High Court. He was appointed to Bench in October 1911 as acting judge, and continued to act in that capacity until February 1913. He served as temporary judge March 1913 – December 1915, then appointed puisne judge in January 1916, a position he held until his retirement in December 1920. He also presided at the Industrial Court from December 1912 to January 1916.

=== Public Service Association ===
He was president of the Public Service Association for two years, and was an instigator of the South Australian Public Service Provident Fund (founded 1893) and the Public Service Superannuation Fund (1902) and was for many years chairman of its board of management.

=== Last years ===
Buchanan retired from the bench in December 1920. He moved to Sydney and died at the residence of his daughter, Mrs. George Ashwin Yuill, Cremorne Road, Cremorne, New South Wales.

== Family ==
Buchanan married Jane Matilda Copland (died 21 October 1914) of Clare on 12 October 1880. They had one daughter and six sons, four of whom served in the Great War.

- Alexander Buchanan (born 20 July 1881), served with 5th? 6th? Australian Motor Transport Company; died in France.
- Bryce Copland Buchanan (30 November 1882 – 27 September 1944)
- R(obert) Keith Buchanan (born 17 January 1885), served with 40th Battalion and 5th Australian Motor Transport Company; married Mary Brennan of Melrose on 11 February 1922.
- John St Clair Buchanan (21 April 1886 – 15 March 1935) served with 15th Australian Field Ambulance
- George Buchanan (born 28 October 1888) served with 10th Battalion and 15th Australian Field Ambulance.
- Mayoh James Buchanan (born 13 November 1891)

Their only daughter, Mary Buchanan (born 14 May 1890), married George Ashwin Yuill on 12 November 1918.

Their first home was "Burton Cottage", Clare; later "Wawanosh", Wood Street, Hyde Park, South Australia (became Millswood), later "Kingsmead", Brougham Place, North Adelaide.

His only brother, John Brice Buchanan, died in South Africa in 1929.
