= Charles Hervey Bagot =

Australian politician

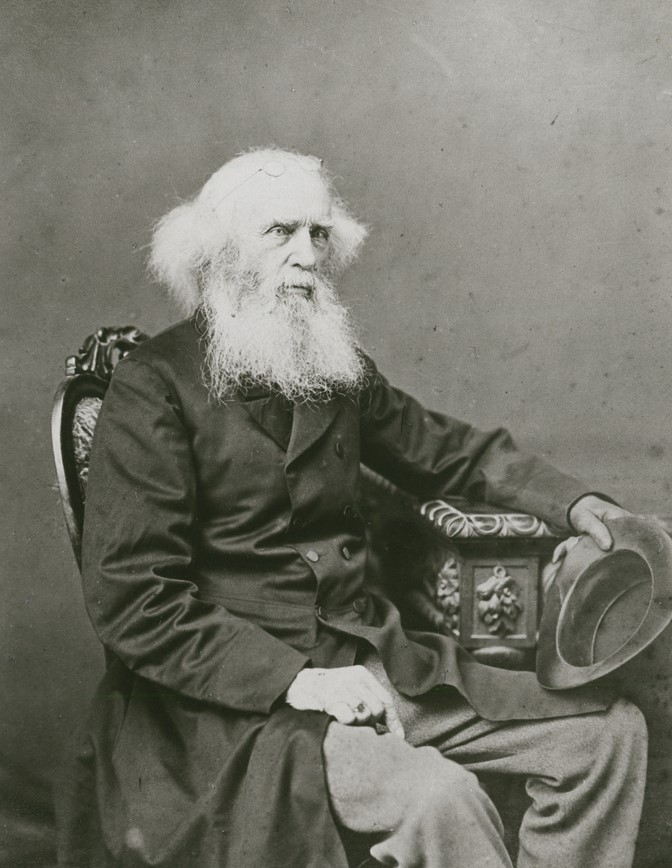
Charles Hervey Bagot

Charles Hervey Bagot (17 April 1788 – 29 July 1880), often referred to as "Captain Bagot", was a South Australian pastoralist, mine owner and parliamentarian, and was the ancestor of a number of notable South Australian citizens.

== Life ==
Charles Hervey Bagot was born on 17 April 1788, in Nurney, County Kildare, Ireland, the son of Christopher and Elizabeth (née Clibborn). He joined the British Army in 1805 and was gazetted to the 87th Regiment of Foot. He is reported as having served with distinction in India during the Mahratta War and was promoted to the rank of captain. About the year 1819 he was retired on half pay to Ennis, County Clare, where he was appointed to the Commission of the Peace, and generally lived the life of a country gentleman.

In 1840 he emigrated to South Australia on the Birman with his wife Mary, née MacCarthy, and their five children, arriving at Port Adelaide on 17 December 1840.

=== Pastoralist ===
Around 1840 Bagot selected a section of 1,500 acres (610 ha) at Koonunga on the River Light, on which he ran sheep in partnership with Frederick Hansborough Dutton. The partnership was dissolved in 1843 and Dutton took the lease on another property near Kapunda, which he named Anlaby for a village in Yorkshire.

Bagot was the first to use John Ridley's reaping machine.

=== Copper mining ===
Towards the end of 1842 his youngest son Charles Samuel Bagot came across mineral specimens on his father's property near the site of the present Kapunda. Around the same time Francis Stacker Dutton found similar outcrops on nearby Anlaby, which he was developing with his brother Frederick Hansborough Dutton. When the Dutton brothers took steps to secure the land around this discovery, they learned of Bagot's find and together got 80 acres surveyed, tendered for it in the Government Gazette, and bought it for the fixed government price for "waste lands" at £1 an acre. Later, when a second section was put up for auction, Dutton and Bagot had to bid up to £2210 to secure it. They secured a mining lease, for which, with a Mr Ravenshaw, (Note: Perhaps J. B. Ravenshaw, who was, with several better-known South Australian financiers, a director of the Australasian Colonial and General Life Assurance and Annuity Company.) he floated a company to work what was in 1844 the first copper mine in Australia (some 18 months before Burra Burra). It produced the richest and purest copper ore the world has ever seen. Kapunda's mine was the saviour of South Australia's financial woes in the 1840s. The mine closed in 1877.

=== Politics ===
Bagot was appointed as Member of the South Australian Legislative Council on 1 July 1844 then was elected to the Assembly seat of Light 12 July 1851 until resigning on 7 July 1853 and for the Legislative Council again, in the days when the whole colony voted as one electorate ("The Province") on 9 March 1857, serving until 27 March 1861 and on 1 March 1865 until 29 January 1869. When he resigned in 1853, John Tuthill Bagot, a distant relation, perhaps a nephew, was elected in his place.

In the first council Bagot distinguished himself by his opposition to Colonel Robe's proposals for endowing selected religious bodies ("State aid") and for imposing a royalty on minerals.

=== Other interests ===
Bagot helped found North Adelaide Congregational Church in 1864 and was a leader of the Total Abstinence League. He published The National Importance of Emigration (London, 1863).

He was Chairman of the Royal Agricultural and Horticultural Society in 1848. (And his grandson Christopher Michael Bagot Jr. (1852–1899) was Secretary from 1890 to 1899.)

In 1853 Bagot built the family residence "Nurney House" on Stanley Street (later 127 Kingston Terrace), North Adelaide, later largely rebuilt around 1930.

== Family ==
Charles Hervey Bagot (c. 17 April 1788 – 29 July 1880) married Mary MacCarthy ( – 17 January 1860) around 1815. He died in North Adelaide, South Australia. Their extensive family included:

- Christopher Michael Bagot Sr. (1817 – 8 November 1853) married John Cliffe Watts's eldest daughter, Margaret Elizabeth (c. 1823 – 6 November 1910) on 6 August 1846. They died at Koonunga and Nurney House, Stanley Street, North Adelaide respectively.

- Charles Hervey Bagot CB (18 May 1847 – 8 November 1911) married Laura Mildred Daniel (– 15 August 1879) on 22 July 1874, in London, moved to India. Second marriage to Alice Law ( – ) on 14 September 1886. With the Royal Engineers; by 1887 he had attained rank of Major, and Colonel in 1899. He was appointed Companion of the Order of the Bath in 1900.

- Beatrice Bagot (11 August 1876 – 4 September 1959)
- Cicely Bagot (22 January 1878 – )
- son (11 May 1879 –)
- son (9 July 1887 – )
- daughter (28 November 1888 – )
- son (19 October 1891 – )

- John Bagot JP (10 January 1849 – 29 August 1910 at Pennington Terrace) married Lucy Josephine Ayers (c. 1857 – 11 May 1945), daughter of Sir Henry on 24 September 1878. Home at Buxton Street, North Adelaide, later Park Terrace, Fitzroy until 1901, then "Forest Lodge", 19 Pine Street, Stirling. He was a director National Bank of Australasia from 1888 to 1893 or later. His widow endowed a prize for botany at the University of Adelaide in his name from 1912.

- Walter Hervey Bagot (17 March 1880 – 27 July 1963) born in Fitzroy, South Australia, married Josephine Margaret Barritt (1889 – 7 June 1946) on 18 November 1908. Home at 101 North Terrace. A noted architect, partner in Woods and Bagot, he rebuilt the family's "Nurney House" between Kingston Terrace and Stanley Street, North Adelaide and designed the garden for their "Forest Lodge" in Stirling, South Australia around 1930.

- John Hervey Bagot (1910–2008) was a prominent lawyer

- Henry Charles Hervey Bagot (25 January 1886 – 27 February 1889)
- son 19 October 1891

- Mary Jane Bagot (23 July 1850 – 2 November 1901) married George Mathieson Turnbull (c. 1840 – 29 November 1885) on 12 December 1868. Died at "Leith House" Barton Terrace.

- George Bagot Turnbull (7 May 1876 – 1 December 1911) married Elsie Stewart Patterson. He died of typhoid and pleurisy at Cottesloe, Western Australia.

- Don Turnbull (28 May 1909 – 30 January 1994) was a prominent tennis player and squash champion.

- Christopher Michael Bagot Jr. (15 June 1852 – 8 October 1899) married Eleanor Mary Hawker (1855 – 11 January 1939) on 1 February 1878. He was Secretary of the Royal Agricultural and Horticultural Society from 1890 to 1899. Home on Anthony Street, Largs Bay, councillor for Largs Ward, Town of Semaphore at the time of his death. Mrs Bagot moved to Heriot Bay then "Forest Lodge", Valdes Island, British Columbia sometime before 1914.

- Nesta Marguerite Bagot (20 October 1878 – 9 February 1882 at "Cliff Cottage" Port Elliot)
- Christopher George Seymour Bagot (23 June 1880 – 1975) Born at "Alverstoke", Glen Osmond. Married Frederica Turquand Clarke ( – ) on 30 November 1910 in Vancouver, Canada, settled on Valdes Island. He was in Pawtucket US http://nla.gov.au/nla.news-article56685413
- Eleanor Ruth Bagot (11 May 1882 – ) at Nurney House, married William Robert Swan (1866– ) on 26 February 1906
- Bessie Violet Bagot (5 June 1884 – ) at Molesworth street, and married (later Sir and CBE) Edward Wilmot Francis Gilman (16 August 1876 – 1955) on 7 December 1904. He became a prominent public servant in Malaysia, finally Resident Councillor of Penang 1930–1931 then retired to Oxfordshire.
- Lieutenant John Frederick Bagot (13 February 1886 – 1961) born at the Grange, married Eileen Dubois Ive ( – ) of Woodville on 22 May 1915.
- Arthur Gerald Bagot (26 April 1888 – 12 November 1979) born at Unley Park, moved to Piawaning, Western Australia, married Noel Irene Harris on 29 March 1938.
- Francis Hawker "Frank" Bagot (11 March 1890 – 26 November 1952) born at Brighton
- Trevor Hope Bagot (30 December 1891 – ) born at Largs.
- Margaret Joanna Bagot (20 September 1894 – ) married William de M. Ive on 31 August 1915 at "Forest Lodge", Valdes Island.
- Aileen Diana Bagot (22 June 1898 – )

- Margaret Elizabeth Bagot Jr. (3 May 1854 – 10 August 1929).

- Mary Elizabeth Bagot (c. 1822 – 20 January 1892) married William Jacob (c. 1815 – 14 July 1902) at Castle Bagot in Ireland on 31 August 1842. and died at 192 Barton Terrace, North Adelaide. William, who arrived on the Rapid in 1836, was a draftsman with Col. William Light and ran a farm "Morooroo" (later often spelled Moorooroo) of 1,100 acres near Rowland Flat and the brother of pioneer Ann Jacob; Jacobs Creek is named for them.

- eldest son Charles Bagot Jacob (15 July 1844 – 30 October 1873)
- John Christopher "Chris" Jacob (1857–) married (Alberta) Martha Esselbach (1863– ) on 1 January 1891. He successfully managed his father's farm, leased it in 1913 and retired to England.

- Edward Meade "Ned" Bagot (13 December 1822 – 24 July 1886) married Mary Pettman (1830 – 5 March 1855) on 1 August 1853. He married again, to the widow Anne Smith, née Walworth ( – 16 February 1892), on 30 July 1857. Anne had at least one child, James Churchill-Smith (1851 – 4 October 1922) by her previous marriage, whom Ned adopted.

- Edward Meade "Ted" Bagot, Jr. (17 July 1848 – 5 June 1881) was born to Mary Pettman before her marriage to his father. Ted died at Dalhousie Springs.
- James Churchill-Smith (1851 – 4 October 1922) was adopted by E. M. Bagot on his marriage to James's mother. He was educated at St. Peter's College and worked all his life for his stepfather at Dalhousie Springs then for Bagot Shakes & Lewis Ltd. He married Lucy McManus ( –1959) in 1890.

- James Churchill-Smith (15 October 1894 – 15 March 1968) served as a Major in both World Wars. His diaries are an important record of World War I.
- Sydney Churchill-Smith ( – ) worked at Newcastle Waters, Northern Territory

- George Wallwall Bagot (2 March 1858 – 3 July 1919), often described as Ned's eldest son, married Ellen Keynes (c. 1858 – 12 January 1925) of Keyneton on 14 April 1881. He was a director of Bagot's Executor and Trustee Company, became partner in Bagot, Shakes & Lewis, land agents, with James Shakes, John Lewis (father of Essington Lewis), A. L. Harrold, W. Gilbert, H. W. Hughes, David James and George Dowling. The company absorbed Luxmoore, Dowling & Jeffrey Ltd. in 1906 then was absorbed into Goldsbrough Mort and Co. Ltd. in 1924.

- George Wallwall Bagot Jr. (15 September 1878 – )

- Richard Neetlee "Dick" Bagot (11 July 1860 – 20 January 1934) married Agnes Adeline King (c. 1860 – 4 August 1951) on 27 December 1887. Residence 7 Marlborough Street, St Peters.

- Frank Neetlee Bagot ( – ) married Caroline Martha Holmes (1893–) on 28 November 1918, with Elder, Smith & Co., Limited, living at Subiaco, Western Australia.
- John Neetlee "Jack" Bagot (17 December 1898 – )

- William Watermit Bagot (20 August 1861 – 16 July 1862)
- Charles Mulcra Bagot (9 March 1863 – 22 July 1895) married Ada Annie Westmacott, lived at Oodnadatta to 1907 then 30 Marlborough Street, College Park

- Charles Ernest Bagot (26 December 1893 – 7 December 1915), twin, died of wounds at Gallipoli.
- Almerta Ann/Annie "Girlie" Bagot (26 December 1893 – 1984), twin born at Oodnadatta married Robert Owen Wilson (1893– ) in London in September 1926
- George Edgar Bagot (24 April 1895 – ) dairy farmer of Echunga married Isabel Galbin on 9 October 1928.

- Mary Bagot (25 August 1864 –) born at "Beefacres"
- Lucy Cowra Bagot (18 November 1865 – 5 February 1898) born at "Beefacres", died at (which?) brother's place, Walkerville
- Lille Nellnell Bagot (2 July 1867 – 1956) married sportsman and administrator Mostyn Evan (22 September 1861 – 25 December 1924) on 7 October 1891
- Sophie Rose Bagot (14 February 1869 – 5 November 1889) at Brougham Place, North Adelaide
- Annie Meade Bagot (31 July 1870 – 4 May 1910)
- Edgar Watermeit Bagot (8 September 1872 – 13 April 1895) With Bank of New South Wales; died at Coolgardie.
- Allan Walter Bagot (24 March 1874 – ) (a mourner at death of E. M. Bagot and mentioned in will of John Haimes)

- Charlotte Owen Bagot (1824 – 22 October 1893) married Captain William H. Maturin CB (1814–1889) on 2 October 1845
- Sir Charles Samuel Bagot (1828 – 21 July 1906) moved to London, became a barrister, married Lucy Francisca Hornby on 29 July 1851 in Lancaster and became Commissioner in Lunacy. He may have been the Charles S. Bagot of East Sheen who adopted Beatrice, the daughter of Lt. Col. C. H. Bagot RE

Another Bagot line

Charles Bagot (1791 – 8 August 1864) of Kilcoursey House, Kings County, Ireland, who also had a number of descendants in South Australia, may have been a brother of Charles Hervey Bagot. He married Anna Tuthill, died in Ireland.

- Charles Emilius Bagot MD (c. 1815 – 29 November 1863) died in Ireland
- John Tuthill Bagot MLC (15 February 1819 – 6 August 1870) barrister and MLC for Light. Married Eliza Meyler (c. 1815 – 14 September 1898) (sister of Rachel below) on 1 June 1848 in Dublin. Died at "Yallum", Buxton Street, home of C. F. Wells. He has been described as a nephew of Charles Hervey Bagot.

- Sarah Ann Woodcock Bagot (September 1849 – 19 January 1853)
- Charles Ulysses Bagot (28 July 1851 – 15 December 1919) born at Kilcoursey Cottage, North Adelaide, married Margaret Eleanor Lawson ( – 24 January 1925) on 22 May 1895, settled on LeFevre Terrace, North Adelaide.
- John Meyler Bagot (27 August 1852 – 29 June 1924) died in Sydney
- (Elizabeth) Frances Harriett Bagot (20 July 1856 – 16 July 1889) married Kenneth John Macaulay (1858 – 1 June 1892) on 22 September 1888. He committed suicide by cutting his throat.
- son (18 June 1858 – )

- Ulysses North Bagot (1822 – 8 November 1882 at MacKinnon Parade) married Rachel Meyler (c. 1826 – 15 October 1884) (sister of Eliza above) in 1850

- Rachel Deborah Bagot (5 September 1854 – 17 April 1934) died of burns at "Elton" 202 Melbourne Street cottage shared with sister Mary
- Mary Gardner Bagot (27 January 1857 – 11 November 1943)
- Eva Bagot (May 1862–1862)

- Anna Frances Bagot (c. 1827 – 18 August 1910) married George Augustus Labatt ( – 1895) in 1853, residence at Brougham Place.

- Charles Bagot Labatt (1855 – 16 January 1929) died in New York
- Henrietta Mary Jane Labatt (1856–) married William Montgomery Orr ( – ) in 1889
- Samuel Bell Labatt (1858–1944)
- John Bagot Labatt (1861 – 12 May 1928) died at "Ru Rua" North Adelaide
- Elizabeth Eva Labatt (1863–1950)
- Anna Georgina Labatt (1865–1943)

- Eliza Mary Bagot (c. 1828 – 3 November 1906)
- Daniel W. W. Bagot (c. 1844 – 1 September 1863), youngest son, died at his father's house "Kilcoursey", King's County, Ireland

Robert Cooper Bagot (c. 1827 – 14 April 1881), born in Fontstown, County Kildare, civil engineer in Queensland and Victoria and first secretary of the Victoria Racing Club invariably referred to as R. C. Bagot, was not clearly related.

== Placenames in SA and NT ==
Named for C. H. Bagot

- Hundred of Bagot (South Australia)
- Bagot Range
- Bagots Flagstaff
- Bagots Gap
- Bagots Well
- Bagot Road, North Adelaide

Named for John Tuthill Bagot

- Hundred of Bagot (Northern Territory)

Unreferenced

- Bagot Street, Kapunda
- Bagot Street, Wallaroo
- Bagot Street, Broken Hill
- Bagot Avenue, Hilton and Mile End
- Bagot Road, Darwin
