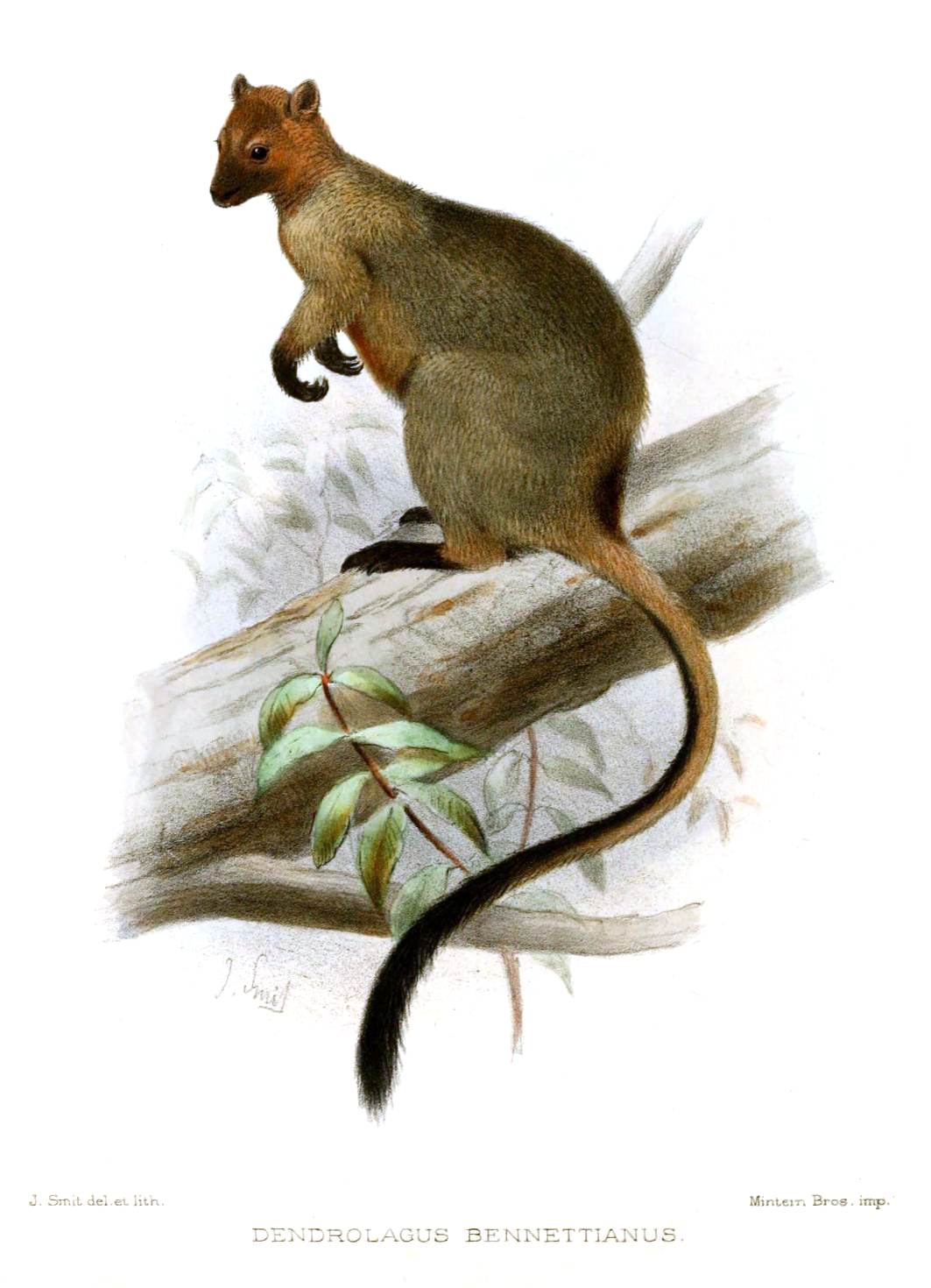

Conservation status
- Near Threatened (IUCN 3.1)

Scientific classification
- Kingdom: Animalia
- Phylum: Chordata
- Class: Mammalia
- Infraclass: Marsupialia
- Order: Diprotodontia
- Family: Macropodidae
- Genus: Dendrolagus
- Species: D. bennettianus

Binomial name
- Dendrolagus bennettianus De Vis, 1887
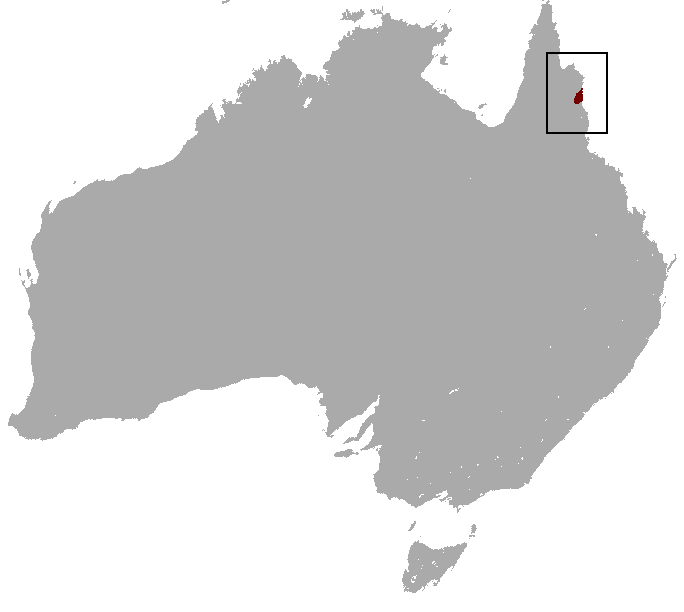
- Bennett's tree-kangaroo range

= Bennett's tree-kangaroo =

Species of marsupial

Bennett's tree-kangaroo (Dendrolagus bennettianus) is a large tree-kangaroo. Males can weigh from 11.5 kg up to almost 14 kg (25 to 31 lbs), while the females range between about 8 to 10.6 kg (18 to 23 lb). They are very agile and are able to leap 9 metres (30 ft) down to another branch and have been known to drop as far as 18 metres (59 ft) to the ground without injury.

== Taxonomy ==
The species was first described by Charles Walter De Vis. It was named for George Bennett.

== Description ==
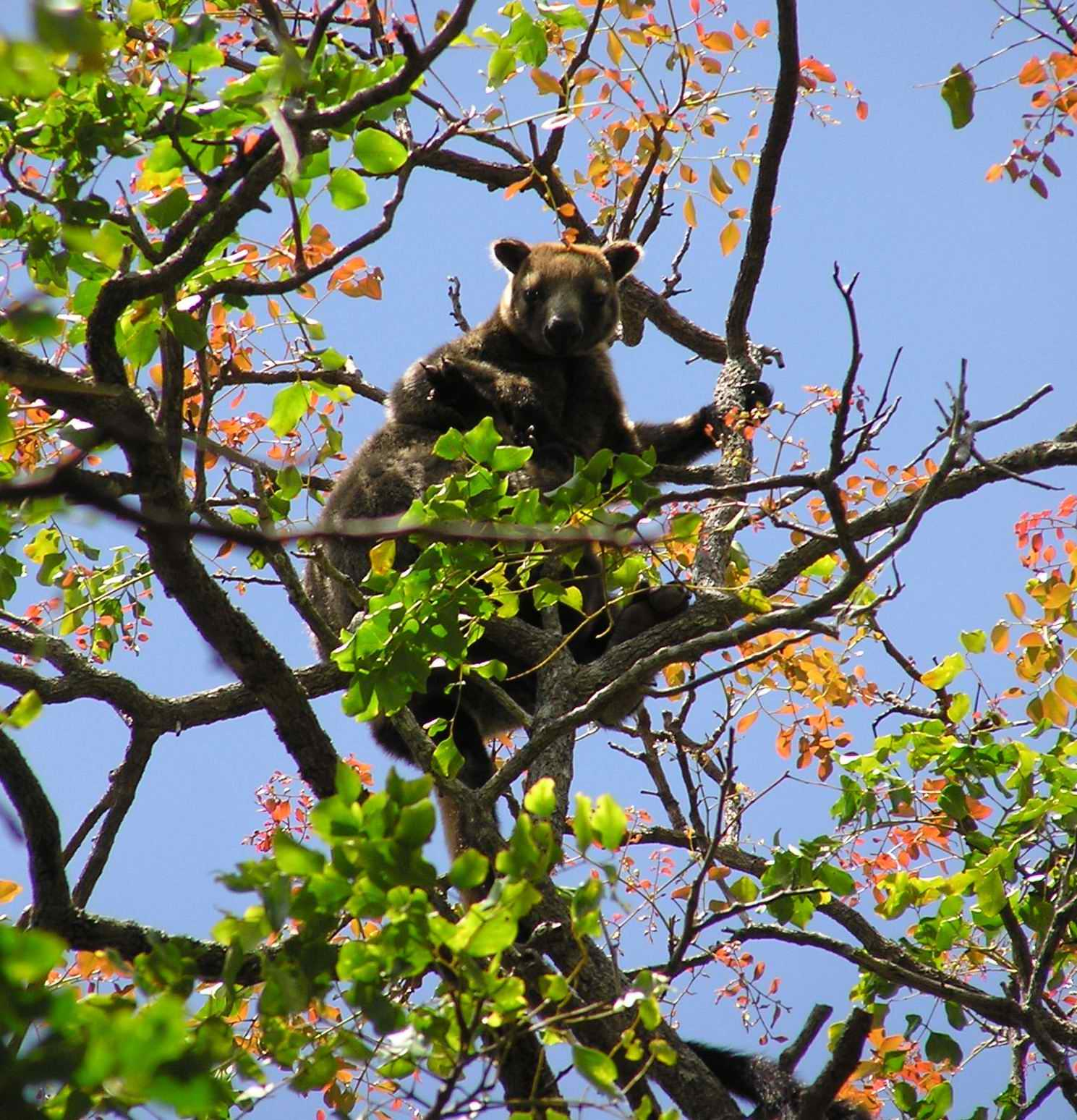
Bennett's tree-kangaroo mother and baby

Like other tree-kangaroos it has longer forelimbs and shorter hindlimbs than terrestrial kangaroos and a long bushy tail. It is mostly dark brown above and lighter fawn on chin, throat and lower abdomen. The forehead and muzzle are greyish. The feet and hands are black. The tail has a black patch at the base and a light patch on the upper part. The ears are short and rounded.

== Habitat ==
This very elusive (or "cryptic") tree-kangaroo is found in both mountain and lowland tropical rain forests south of Cooktown, Queensland to just north of the Daintree River; an area of only about 70 by 50 km (43 by 31 mi). It is also occasionally found in sclerophyll woodlands. It lives almost completely on the leaves of a wide range of rainforest trees, notably Heptapleurum actinophyllum (the umbrella tree), vines, ferns and various wild fruits.

== Diet ==
The Bennett's tree-kangaroo is a herbivore. It mostly eats leaves off 33 different plant species.

Now that it is rarely hunted by Aboriginal Australians, its main predators are Australian scrub pythons and the dingo. It is thought to be the closest tree-kangaroo to the ancestral form.

== Conservation status ==
Although the IUCN still rates the status of Bennett's tree-kangaroo as "near threatened", its numbers seem to be increasing and its range expanding. Sightings have become far more common in recent years. In 2006 a dead specimen was found along Amos Bay Road, just south of Cooktown. The increases in numbers and range are likely because most of its range is now protected under World Heritage legislation, and it is no longer hunted by Indigenous Australians. Both Roger Martin and Lewis Roberts, two of the world's top experts on this species, agree that it should now be classified as "secure".
