= John Finnis (captain) =

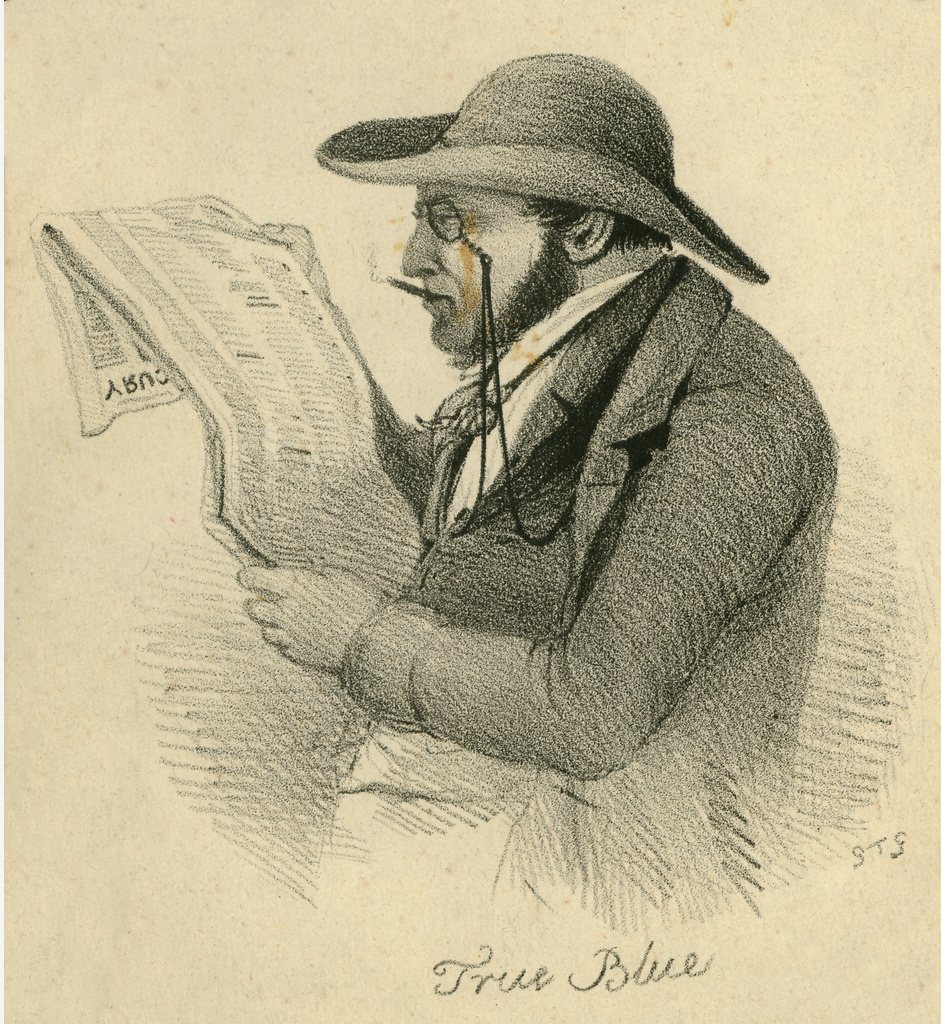
S. T. Gill Captain John Finnis

John Finnis (3 December 1802 – 13 August 1872), generally known as "Captain Finnis", was a seaman who is remembered for his association with Charles Sturt in the colonial period of South Australia.

== History ==
Finnis was born in Dover, a son of Gilbert Finnis and his wife Elizabeth Finnis (née Nash). He became a mariner and in 1831 with Joseph Montefiore purchased the barque Elizabeth. As captain he then spent a number of years whaling in the southern seas.

In September 1838, he, with Captain Charles Sturt, Giles Strangways and George McLeod (a Norfolk Island friend of Sturt) brought 400 cattle overland from the Hume River. In 1839 Finnis, with Hampden Dutton and Duncan McFarlane, purchased 4000 acres (the Mount Barker Special Survey, the first such), to the chagrin of John Barton Hack, who was squatting there and had no intimation of the Special Survey. The land was used to fatten their cattle for sale, and settle 39 German families. brought to Australia by George Fife Angas on the Zebra (Captain Hahn) and Catharina (Captain Schecht). The following year he drove 10,000 sheep from New South Wales to Adelaide with Nelson and John Tooth, then supervised several later musters. Early in 1841 he and Frederick Dutton had another 12,000 sheep brought overland, which they offered for sale in March 1841, and also quantities of brandy, cigars and tobacco which they had brought by sea.

In 1843 he returned to the sea, chartering the Joseph Albino to bring goods from New Zealand and by the return journey export wheat and other commodities. He then purchased the ship and made other voyages, but the Joseph Albino was impounded in America with no redress.

He died at his home in Franklin Street, Adelaide.

== Family ==
In Sydney, on 23 March 1832, he married Ludovina Rosa Da Silva Cameron (1796 – 21 August 1854), the widow of Colonel Charles Cameron (1777–1827). Children of Rosa and Charles included:

- Charlotte da Silva Cameron (1813 – 11 May 1885) married (William) Hampden Dutton (1805 – 21 November 1849) on 2 July 1831.
- Ewan Wallace Cameron (26 July 1816 – 25 May 1876) married Sophia Nail in 1856
- Julia Anne Ludovina Cameron (c. 1820 – 15 June 1846) married Dr. George Bennett (1804–1893) of Sydney on 28 November 1835. She took her own life by taking prussic acid. They had two sons and three daughters.
- Ludovina Catherina da Silva Cameron (1824 – 21 October 1851) married George Strickland Kingston on 10 April 1841 (she was his second wife). They had five surviving children:

- Ludovina Cameron Kingston (16 March 1842 – 6 May 1908)
- Hester Holland Kingston (30 October 1843 – 12 May 1893)
- Charlotte Julian (not Julia) Kingston (11 September 1845 – 20 May 1913) married Hubert Giles (21 October 1842 – 11 August 1901), son of William Giles, on 17 March 1880
- Strickland Gough Kingston (18 December 1848 – 3 October 1897) a lawyer, killed himself after losing a case
- Charles Cameron Kingston (22 October 1850 – 11 May 1908), Premier of South Australia from 1893 to 1899

On 3 September 1856, at his home in Franklin Street, Adelaide, Finnis married Mary Ann Russell, a daughter of his sister. The Rev. James Pollitt was charged under canon law, on the information of G. S. Kingston, of officiating at a clandestine marriage within the Anglican Church's prohibited bounds of consanguity, and had his licence suspended for a year. They had two sons, one of whom, John Mercer Finnis ( – 2 April 1909) survived to adulthood, and whose son, Harold Finnis, was a longtime secretary of the R.A.& H.S

== Legacy ==
The State Library of South Australia has a portrait of Finnis by S. T. Gill
