= Frederick Dutton (Australian politician) =

Australian politician (1812–1890)

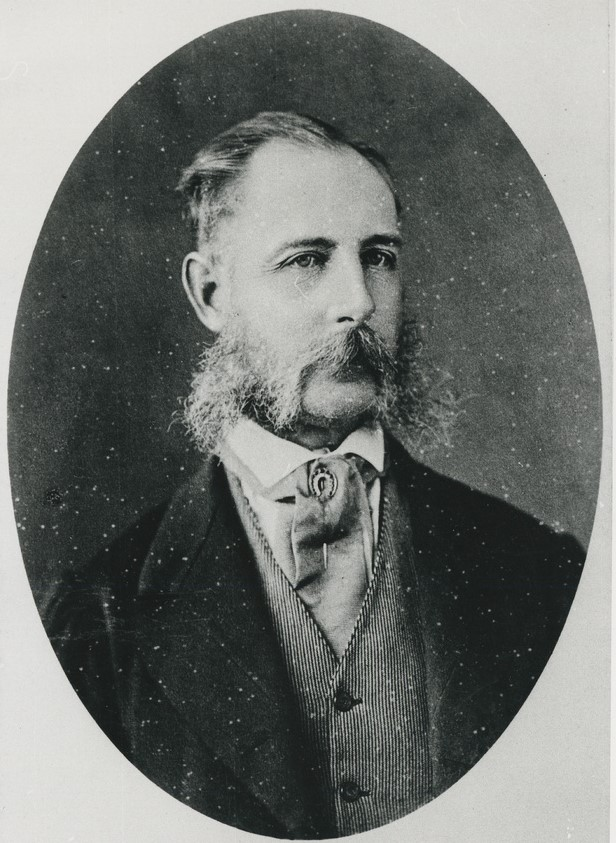

Frederick Hansborough Dutton (2 April 1812 – 22 April 1890) was a pastoralist and politician in the colony of South Australia.

== Early life ==
Frederick Hansborough (sometimes Hansbrow) Dutton was born on 2 April 1812 at Colne, Lancashire, and was baptised at St. Bartholomew's Church, Colne, on 25 May 1813.

== Career ==
Dutton first set foot on Australian soil on Thursday, 4 March 1830, arriving aboard the Lady Blackwood (captained by John Dibbs), with his brother, William Hampden Dutton. Between 1830 and 1838, Frederick and William embarked upon several livestock-rearing endeavors, including on the Yass Plains, in the Monaro district, and in the vicinity of Albury on the banks of Lake Hume.

Frederick first arrived in South Australia from New South Wales by ship around the beginning of 1841, having, in partnership with (sea) Captain John Finnis, had some 12,000 sheep brought overland, which they offered for sale in March 1841, and also quantities of brandy, cigars and tobacco which they had brought by sea.

Around 1840 he selected, in partnership with Charles Hervey Bagot, a section of 1500 acres (600ha) at Koonunga on the River Light, on which they ran sheep. The partnership was dissolved in 1843 and Dutton took the lease on a property near Kapunda, which he named Anlaby for a village in Yorkshire. He installed his brother Francis as manager and Alexander Buchanan (c. 1809 – 21 May 1865) as overseer. He and Alexander Lang Elder took up a special survey at Mount Remarkable. Apart from his pastoral properties, he had substantial interests in copper mines at Burra, Kapunda and Montacute. He was a director of the Bank of Australasia.

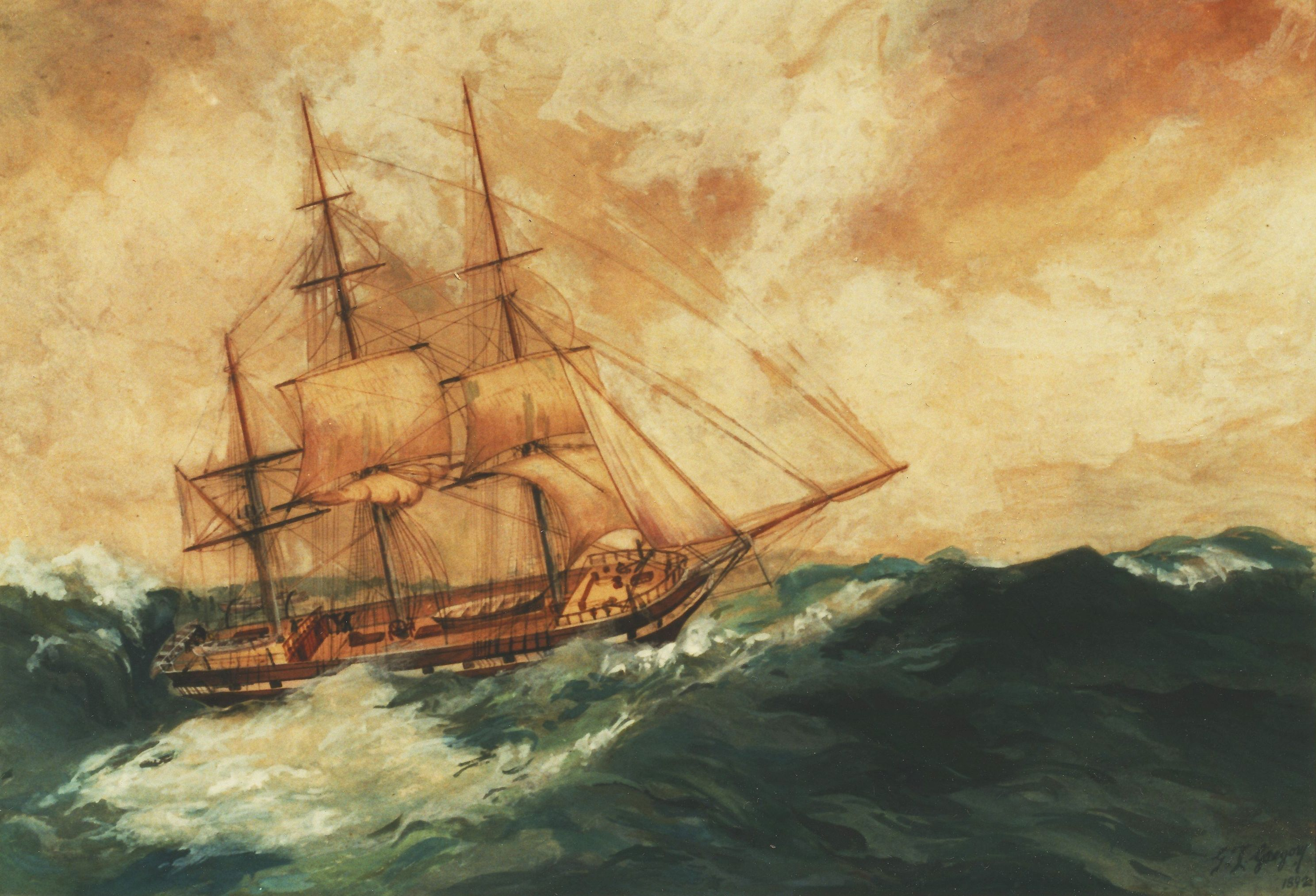
The Lady Blackwood, which brought Frederick Dutton to Sydney in 1830.

He sat in the South Australian Legislative Council between 25 August 1852 and 14 July 1853, (see Members of the South Australian Legislative Council, 1851–1855) having been nominated by the Governor of South Australia, Sir Henry Edward Fox Young, as a Non-Elective Member following the resignation of George Anstey. He resigned in 1853, and left for England, only returning in 1858. Six months later he left again, returning in 1868. He left again, never to return; his ability to participate actively in his business interests being greatly hampered by cataracts. He joined the Royal Colonial Institute in 1872.

Dutton never married. He died in London with assets valued at £800,000 (around AUD150,000,000 today). He left Anlaby to his nephew Henry Dutton.

Newspaper articles record that in his final years he laboured under the great affliction of being blind and deaf. At the time of his death, he was living at the Buckingham Palace Hotel, opposite Buckingham Palace. He was buried at Paddington Cemetery, London.

== Philanthropy ==
Unlike many "pioneers" who made their fortunes and retired to the "Old Country" as absentee landlords and shareholders, Frederick Dutton did leave some assets for the people of South Australia. During his lifetime he gave £2,500 for the establishment of the Kapunda Hospital, gave land and funds to establish Dutton Park recreation area in Kapunda, and endowed the Kapunda and Light Agricultural Society and Kapunda Institute. He also made considerable donations to the St. Peter's Cathedral building fund and St. Peter's College.

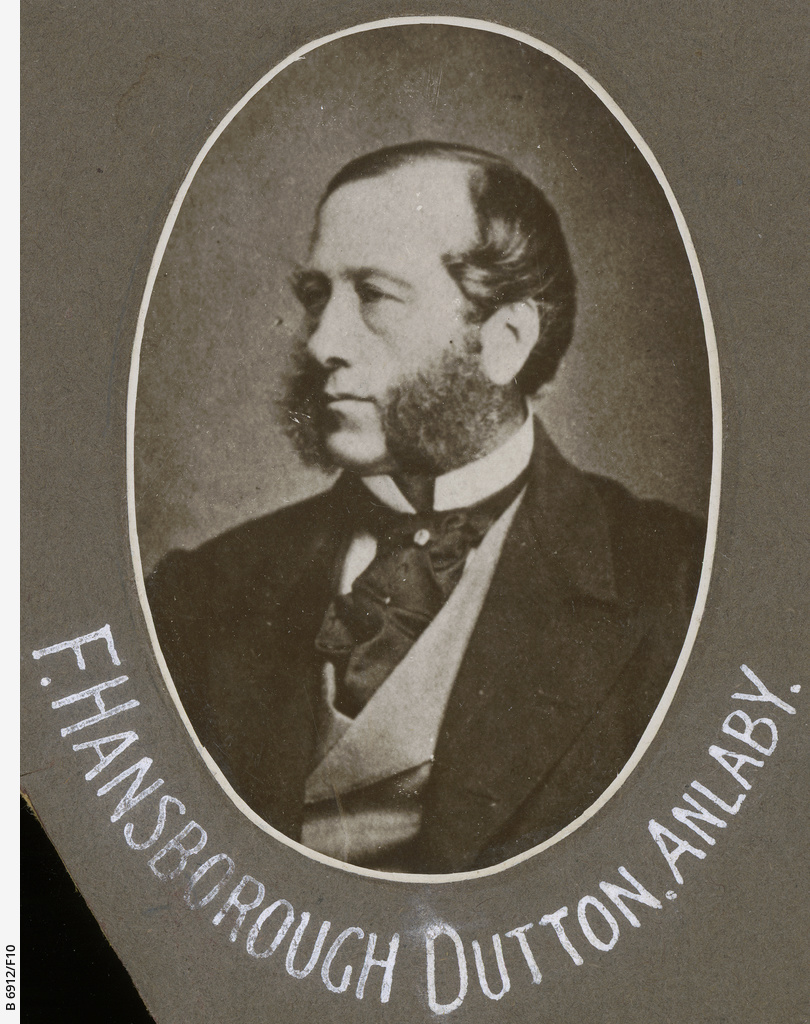
Frederick Hansborough Dutton, c. 1860.

== Family ==
Frederick Hugh Hampden Dutton married Mary Ann Pollock on 30 August 1804, lived in England and Cuxhaven, Germany had five sons:

- William Hampden Dutton (1805–1849), married Charlotte Cameron on 2 July 1831
  - Henry Dutton.(1848–1914) inherited Anlaby
- Frederick Hansborough Dutton (1812 – 22 Apr 1890) subject of this article, never married
- Pelham John Dutton (c. 1813 – 11 April 1847) married Elizabeth Wilson on 1 October 1839, lived in Sydney, died in Adelaide. Elizabeth married again, to Richard Willoughby Laws on 7 July 1849.
- Francis Stacker Dutton C.M.G. (1818–1877), twice Premier of South Australia, married Caroline MacDermott on 7 November 1849

- Sir Frederick Dutton (14 April 1855 – ca.9 May 1932) knighted 1921 for wartime efforts
