= Kadina =

Kadina may refer to:

== Australia ==
=== New South Wales ===
- Kadina, New South Wales, a locality
- Kadina High School

=== South Australia ===
- Kadina, South Australia, a town and locality
- Kadina Cemetery
- Kadina Town Hall, a town hall in South Australia
- Corporate Town of Kadina, a former local government area
- District Council of Kadina, a former local government area
- Hundred of Kadina, a cadastral unit in South Australia

== North Macedonia ==
- Kadina River

== See also ==
- Kadena
