= Hundred of Wallaroo =

Wallaroo
- Cadastral division
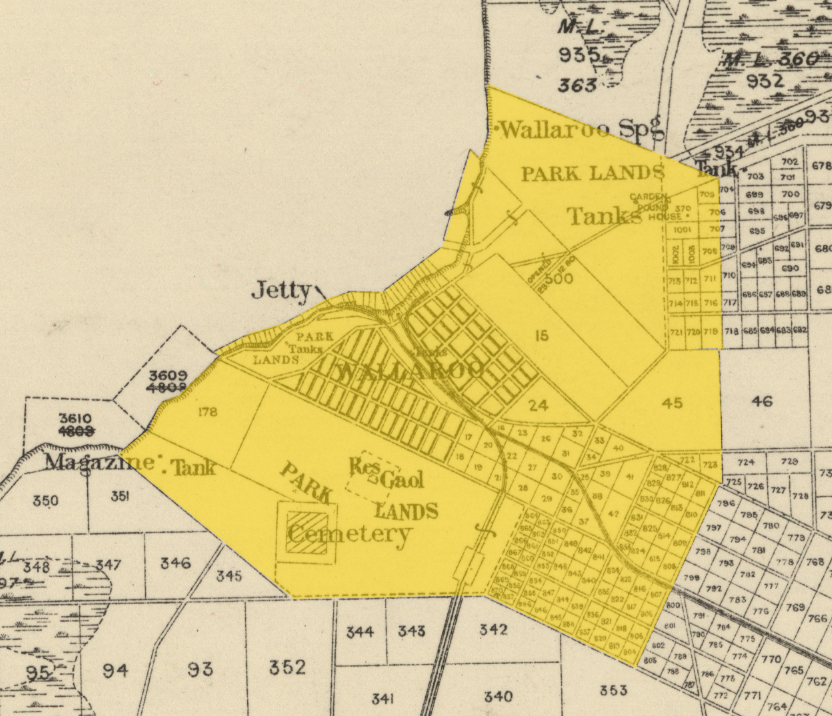
- 1874 boundaries of Wallaroo Town shown on an excerpt of an 1888 map of the hundred

- Coordinates: 33.995°S 138.652°E
- Country: Australia
- State: South Australia
- Region: Yorke Peninsula
- LGA(s): Copper Coast
- Established: 12 June 1862

Area
  - Total: 320 km^{2} (124 sq mi)
- County: Daly
Lands administrative divisions around Wallaroo
Spencer Gulf	Tickera	Tickera
Spencer Gulf	Wallaroo	Kadina
Spencer Gulf	Tiparra	Tiparra

The Hundred of Wallaroo is a cadastral unit of hundred located on the Copper Coast of South Australia. It is one of the 16 hundreds of the County of Daly. It was named in 1862 by Governor Dominick Daly after the indigenous term wadla warru presumed to mean wallaby urine.

== Locations ==
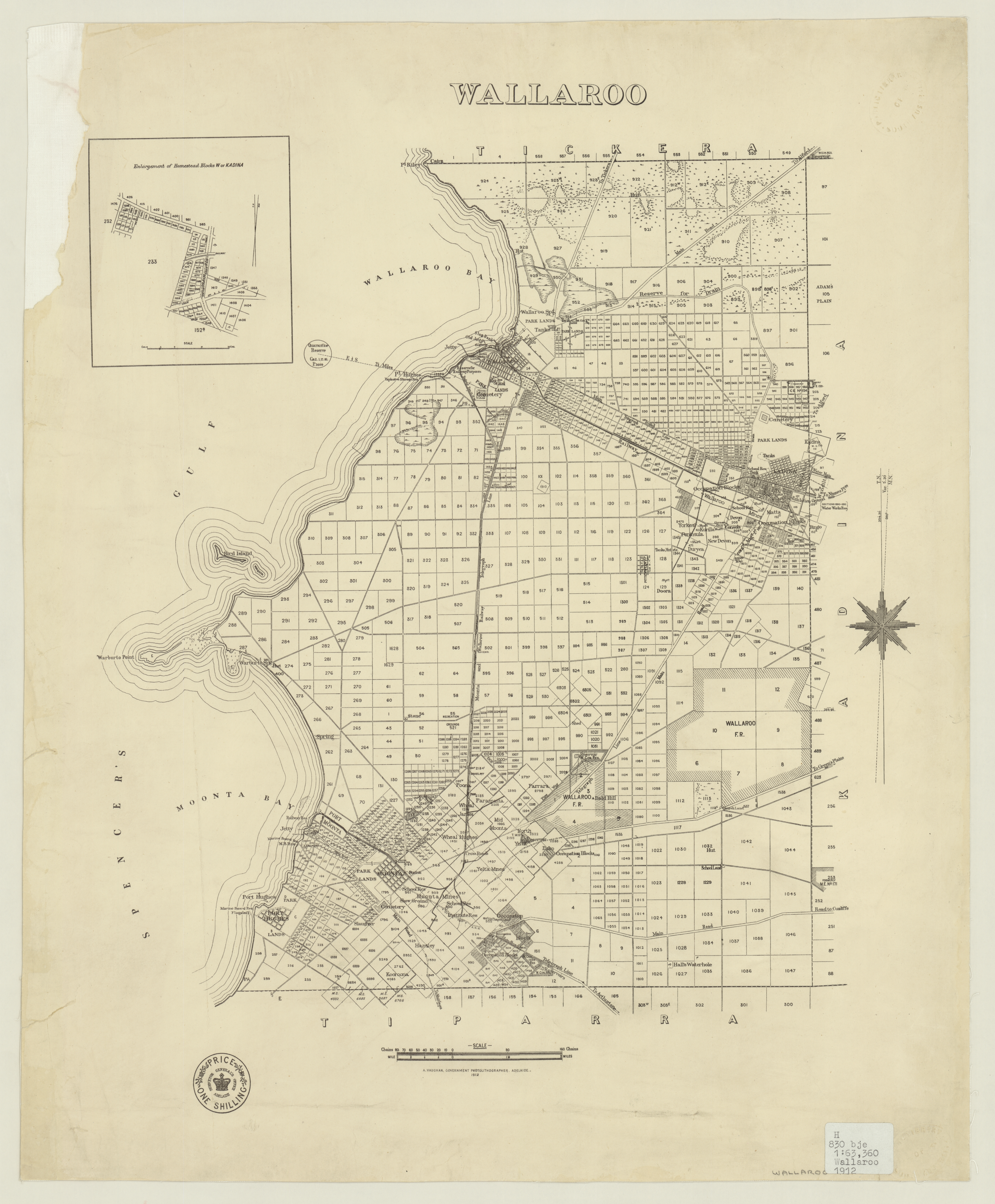
Map of the hundred in 1912

The most densely populated town and localities of the Copper Coast council are situated inside (or largely inside) the bounds of the Hundred of Wallaroo:

- Wallaroo and North Beach
- Kadina (western half) and its suburbs: New Town, Jericho, Wallaroo Mines, Matta Flat and Jerusalem
- Moonta and its suburbs: Moonta Bay, North Moonta, Paramatta, Cross Roads, North Yelta, Yelta, Moonta Mines, East Moonta, Hamley, Port Hughes and Kooroona
- Rural localities of Wallaroo Plain (west portion), Warburto and Boors Plain (larger west portion)

== Local government ==
- Corporate Town of Kadina (1872-1977)
- Corporate Town of Moonta (1872-1984)
- Corporate Town of Wallaroo (1874-1997)
- District Council of Kadina (1888-1984)
- District Council of Northern Yorke Peninsula (1984-1997)
- District Council of the Copper Coast (1997-)

== See also ==
- Lands administrative divisions of South Australia
