= Wallaroo, South Australia (disambiguation) =

Wallaroo, South Australia is a town and a locality in South Australia

Wallaroo, South Australia may also refer to:

- Corporate Town of Wallaroo, a former local government area
- Electoral district of Wallaroo, a former state electorate
- Hundred of Wallaroo, a cadastral unit
- Wallaroo Times, a former newspaper which became part of the Kadina and Wallaroo Times

== See also ==
- Wallaroo (disambiguation)
- Wallaroo Mines, South Australia
- Wallaroo Plain, South Australia
