= Hundred of Kulpara =

Kulpara
- Cadastral division
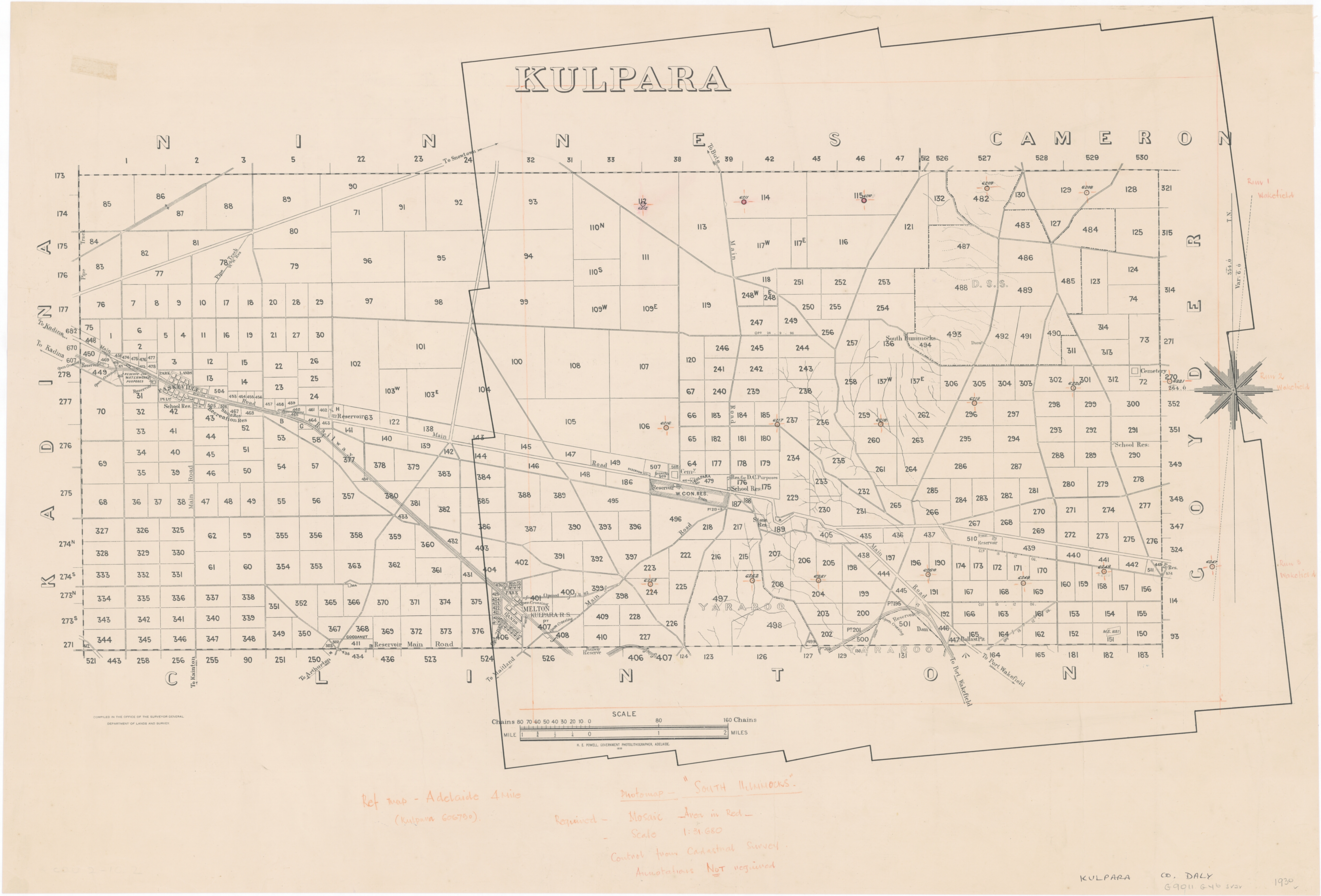
- Cadastral map of Hundred of Kulpara, 1930

- Coordinates: 34.043°S 138.005°E
- Country: Australia
- State: South Australia
- Region: Yorke Peninsula
- LGAs: Barunga West; Copper Coast
- Established: 12 June 1862

Area
  - Total: 280 km^{2} (109 sq mi)
- County: Daly
Lands administrative divisions around Kulpara
Kadina	Ninnes	Cameron
Kadina	Kulpara	Goyder
Tiparra	Clinton	Goyder

The Hundred of Kulpara is a cadastral unit of hundred located on the northern Yorke Peninsula in South Australia and centred on the township of Kulpara. It is one of the 16 hundreds of the County of Daly and was proclaimed by Governor Dominick Daly on 12 June 1862.

The hundred was named for a Kulpara Pastoral Station, a pastoral lease in the area in the mid-1800s. The name Kulpara is thought to derive from an indigenous term meaning 'water in the head'. Apart from the town of Kulpara, the hundred also contains the localities of Paskeville, Melton and South Hummocks.

== Local government ==
The District Council of Green's Plains was established in 1871, bringing the hundreds of Kadina and Kulpara under local administration for the first time. In 1888 the new District Council of Kadina absorbed all of Green's Plains as well as surrounding unincorporated lands in the hundreds of Moonta and Wallaroo. On 1 July 1890 the District Council of Kulpara was established to locally govern the Hundred of Kulpara independent of Kadina council. In 1932, due to flagging population, Kulpara council was abolished and the Paskeville ward (the western third of the hundred) was returned to Kadina council while the remainder (the eastern two thirds of the hundred) was absorbed by the District Council of Bute.

Kadina district council ultimately became part of the District Council of Northern Yorke Peninsula in 1977, which included both the township of Moonta and Kadina district, and then part of the District Council of the Copper Coast in 1997, which included the slightly larger township of Wallaroo with the rest of the Copper Coast district.

Bute district council ultimately became part of the District Council of Barunga West in 1997 by amalgamation with the District Council of Port Broughton.
