= District Council of Kadina =

Coordinates: 33°57′45″S 137°42′55″E

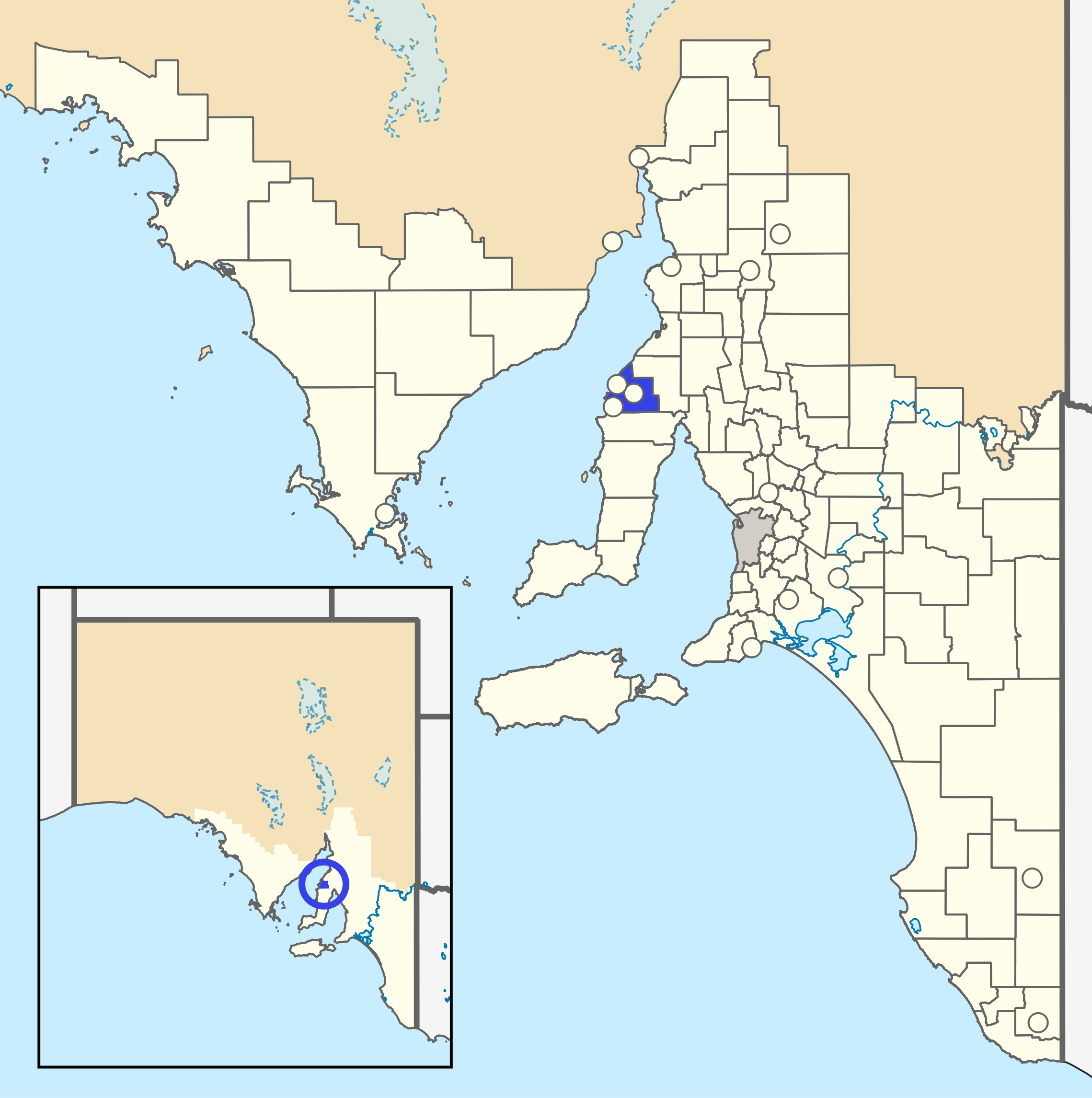
The District Council of Kadina as it was in 1970 (blue), before absorbing the Corporate Towns (marked by circles)

The District Council of Kadina was a local government area in the Copper Coast area of South Australia from 1888 to 1984.

== History ==
It was established by the District Councils Act 1887, which took effect from 5 January 1888. It comprised the former District Council of Green's Plains, which amalgamated into the new council, and the areas of the cadastral Hundreds of Moonta and Wallaroo not contained in the Corporate Town of Kadina, Corporate Town of Moonta or the Corporate Town of Wallaroo. There had earlier been a serious attempt by Kadina residents to establish a Kadina council in 1866-1867, prior to the creation of the Corporate Town of Kadina, but it had been defeated by Wallaroo residents and the owners of the Wallaroo Mines.

The council first met in the town of Paskeville, but the Paskeville Ward was severed from the council and added to the District Council of Kulpara on 1 July 1890. It operated out of offices in the Kadina Town Hall from 1889 until 1916, when it purchased a former shop on the corner of Digby Street and Taylor Street in Kadina and converted it to council chambers. The council had made frequent complaints in the early 1900s about being continually ignored in favour of the three corporate towns in the area (Kadina, Moonta and Wallaroo), and being excluded from important meetings.

The Kadina council regained the Paskeville area on 12 May 1932 when the Kulpara council was abolished. In June 1932, it lost portions of Moonta Bay, North Moonta and Port Hughes to the Corporate Town of Moonta. In 1936, it was responsible for an area of 155,200 acres with a capital value of £606,580. The council opened new chambers on 23 October 1959.

The Corporate Town of Kadina had shown interest in amalgamation with surrounding municipalities, particularly the District Council of Kadina, as early as 1968. The development of the Kadina township had reached the limits of the municipal boundaries, and the historical Kadina suburbs of Jerusalem, Jericho, New Town and Wallaroo Mines were all across the boundary in the District Council of Kadina. The District Council declined attempts at amalgamation in 1970 and 1972, but changed its stance in 1976 after the town council instead sought to annex the surrounding suburbs. As a result, the Corporate Town of Kadina merged into the District Council of Kadina in 1977. The District Council ceased to exist on 1 July 1984 when it amalgamated with the Corporate Town of Moonta to form the District Council of Northern Yorke Peninsula.

== Chairmen ==
- Peter Allen (1888-1891)
- David Taylor (1892-1893)
- John Wearne (1894)
- Hermann Fuss (1895-1896)
- Peter Roach (1897-1900)
- James Malcolm (1901)
- W. T. Andrewartha (1902)
- Paul Roach (1903-1906)
- Alfred Rodda (1906-1940)
- John Pedler (1940-1942)
- Robert John Daddow (1942-1944)
- Norman Campbell McCauley (1944-1946)
- Leonard Edwin Young (1946-1948)
- Francis Perrin Price (1948-1950)
- Hartley Rodda (1950-1952)
- Harold Goldsworthy (1952-1954)
- Frederick George Albert Bensen (1954-1956)
- Joseph Norman Abbott (1956-1958)
- Charles Emmanuel Larcombe (1958-1960)
- Francis Perrin Price (1960-1961)
- Harold Goldsworthy (1961-1962)
- Frederick George Albert Bensen (1962-1963)
- Cyril Keith Kennett (1963-1965)
- Albert Alexander Haynes (1965-1967)
- Donald William Hawke (1967-1969)
- Harold Goldsworthy (1969-1970)
- John Campbell Allen (1970-1972)
- Cyril Keith Kennett (1972-1974)
- Graham Dale Morphett (1974-1977)
- John Olsen (1977)
- Graham Dale Morphett (1977-1984)
