= Corporate Town of Kadina =

Local government area in South Australia

Coordinates: 33°57′45″S 137°42′45″E

Seat of the former Corporate Town of Kadina in South Australia

The Corporate Town of Kadina was a local government area in South Australia from 1872 to 1977, based in the town of Kadina.

== History ==
The council was proclaimed on 31 July 1872, following a 200-strong public meeting in May and subsequent petition to the government. The boundaries of the municipality were defined as Eliza Terrace, Julia Terrace, Lindsay Terrace, Doswell Terrace, Sophia Terrace, Cameron Terrace and Frances Terrace. It was divided into four wards at its inception: Elder Ward, Hughes Ward, Stirling Ward and Taylor Ward. The proclamation named Thomas Herne Hall as the first mayor, and Thomas Cornish and James Martin (Elder), R. W. Bawden and R. S. Haddy (Hughes), Thomas Tregoweth and John Rundle (Stirling) and William Harris and John Tonkin (Taylor) as the first councillors. The council meetings were initially held in Hall's store.

In 1883, the new council conducted a beautification scheme in what was to become Victoria Square, replacing the "veritable eyesore" that had existed beforehand. The council acquired the Kadina Institute in 1889 after the institute committee had struggled to make repayments on a loan for the 1883 addition of a hall; the building then became the Kadina Town Hall. On 23 June 1908, the council became the first municipality in South Australia to be powered by its own electric lighting plant.

On 3 May 1917, it annexed the adjacent area of Kadina South, a residential area south of the railway land that had until then been controlled by the District Council of Kadina and thus lacked town council municipal services. In May 1932, it assumed control of the Kadina Cemetery from the former board of trustees. In 1936, it was responsible for an area of 1,030 acres with a capital value of £542,880. The council would remain responsible for electricity in the town until the 1950s, when the town plant was taken over by the Electricity Trust of South Australia.

By 1968, there was support for amalgamation with the surrounding municipalities, as the development of the town had reached the limits of the municipal boundaries, and the historical Kadina suburbs of Jerusalem, Jericho, New Town and Wallaroo Mines were all across the boundary in the District Council of Kadina, which wholly surrounded the town. Merger discussions in 1969, 1970 and 1972 were unsuccessful, but after the town council attempted to annex the surrounding suburbs instead, an agreement was reached to amalgamate the two Kadina councils in September 1876. The council held its last meeting on 4 April 1977 before merging into the District Council of Kadina.

== Mayors ==
- Thomas Herne Hall (1872-1873)
- Frederick W. Gurner (1874-1875)
- John Gaskell (1876-1877)
- Richard Haselgrove (1878-1879)
- Robert W. Bawden (1879)
- John Gaskell (1879-1880)
- John J. Christmas (1881-1882)
- James Martin (1883-1884)
- Robert J. Nobes (1885)
- Thomas W. Rendell (1886-1888)
- Alfred France Jr. (1889-1891)
- Richard Haselgrove (1892-1895)
- William M. Blackney (1896-1897)
- Robert J. Nobes (1898-1899)
- Philip Jackson (1900-1901)
- H. Arthur Powell (1902-1903)
- John Mitchell (1904-1906)
- John Albert Southwood (1907-1908)
- Joseph Tonkin (1909-1912)
- C. Albert E. Hall (1913-1914)
- Paul Roach (1915-1919)
- Leslie H. H. Shepley (1920-1921)
- John B. K. Dunstone (1922-1923)
- Paul Roach (1924)
- Charles E. C. Wilson (1925)
- Walter C. Hallam (1926-1927)
- Richard L. Spry (1928)
- Harold Bruce (1929-1930)
- Edwin H. C. Hall (1931-1933)
- William Lakeland Pinnell (1934-1936)
- Henry Measday (1936-1946)
- James Crimeen Ellery McCarthy (1946-1951)
- Clifford James Dunstone (1951-1952)
- Spence Du Rieu Crosby (1952-1962)
- William Francis Wearn (1962-1964)
- Kenneth Barry Warmington (1964-1966)
- Frederick Lewis Thyer (1966-1968)
- Keith Russack (1968-1971)
- Lloyd George Davies (1971-1974)
- John Olsen (1974-1977)
