= Hundred of Kadina =

Kadina
- Cadastral division
- Coordinates: 33°59′12″S 137°48′02″E
- Country: Australia
- State: South Australia
- Region: Yorke and Mid North
- LGA(s): Copper Coast
- Established: 12 June 1862

Area
  - Total: 320 km^{2} (124 sq mi)
- County: Daly
Lands administrative divisions around Kadina
Tickera	Tickera	Wiltunga
Wallaroo	Kadina	Ninnes; Kulpara
Tiparra	Tiparra	Clinton

The Hundred of Kadina is a cadastral unit of hundred located on the north-western Yorke Peninsula in South Australia. It is one of the 16 hundreds of the County of Daly and was proclaimed by Governor Dominick Daly on 12 June 1862.

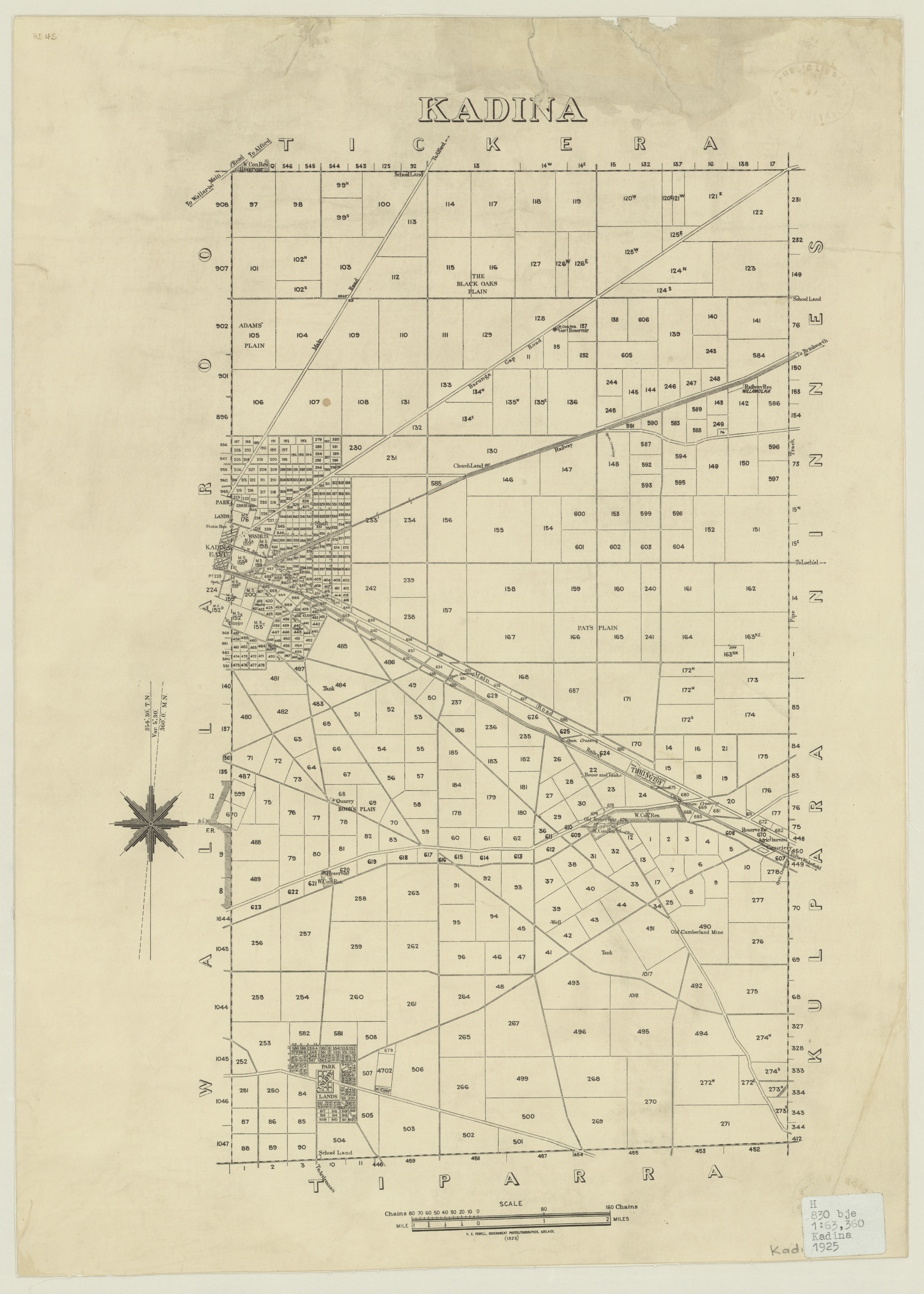
Plan of Hundred of Kadina, 1925

The hundred was named for a Narungga term Gardina which is thought to mean 'lizard plain'. The township of Cunliffe is located in the south western corner of the hundred and the eastern outskirts of the eponymous major township of Kadina cross the mid-western border of the hundred.

== Local government ==
The District Council of Green's Plains was established in 1871, bringing parts of the hundreds of Kadina and Kulpara under local administration for the first time. In 1888 the council was abolished by promulgation of the District Councils Act 1887 and replaced with the new District Council of Kadina, which administered both the Hundred of Kadina and much of the adjacent Hundred of Wallaroo as the part of the Hundred of Kulpara formerly in Green's Plains council. In 1984 Kadina council became a large part of the new District Council of Northern Yorke Peninsula, Then, in 1997, the last remaining independent local government body, the Corporate Town of Wallaroo, was amalgamated with the district council to form the new District Council of the Copper Coast.
