= Gulf FM (Australia) =

- Australia
- Broadcast area: Copper Coast and surrounding Yorke Peninsula
- Frequency: 89.3 MHz

Programming
- Format: Community

Ownership
- Owner: Community

History
- First air date: March 1998

Technical information
- Transmitter coordinates: 34.2564°S 137.7694°E

Links
- Website: Gulf FM website

Gulf FM (ACMA callsign: 5GFM) is a community radio station based on the Copper Coast in South Australia. Gulf FM broadcasts 24 hours a day, 7 days a week, to the Copper Coast and surrounding areas. A proportion of the output is automated, but live announcers are used from 7am to midnight.

Its studios are at 31 Hallett Street, Kadina, South Australia and its broadcast tower is at Tank Hill, Kadina.

The Station is run entirely by volunteers, including a Board of eight (8). Main source of funding is Sponsorship, Fundraising Events, Membership Subscriptions, Community Support Groups Subscriptions, Buddy Subscriptions, Donations, and Grants sourced from the Community Broadcasting Foundation and the Copper Coast Council's Annual Community Grants Scheme.
