= Doora mine =

Former copper mine in South Australia

Doora Mine
- Location within South Australia

Location
- Location: South Australia, Australia; 33°59′20″S 137°40′45″E

Production
- Products: Copper Ore

History
- Opened: 1870

Doora Mine was a copper mine in the Copper Coast region of South Australia, to the south of Kadina. It began to produce copper around the start of 1871.

== Foundation ==
The Doora Mine opened at the end of 1870. It lay in the same district as the Moonta and Wallaroo mines. The main outcrop of copper in this area lies almost due north and south, with the lodes running east and west. The mine owners operated a light railway line. According to the Chronicle on 3 June 1871, "He would be a bold man who should affirm that all the mineral treasures buried on Yorke's Peninsula have as yet been discovered... About 12 months ago we gave an account of the discovery of the new mine, which Mr. Hughes has named the Doora - the native name of the Peninsula tribe of blacks..."

== Operations ==
In December 1870 The South Australian Advertiser noted that the Wallaroo Mining Company was suspending operations at the Matta Mine and the Wandilta, but reported "a continually increasing field for operations at the Doora Mine". As reported in the Walleroo Times of 31 December 1872, a remarkable collection of copper ores and samples of the lodes from the Doora Mine and the Walleroo Mines was sent to England for the 1873 World Exhibition in Vienna, Austria. At the time of the exhibition, the mine was said to be prospering. In April 1874 the Wallaroo miners joined the Moonta miners on strike. Women with brooms drove off all men found working. The miners at Doora Mine met and decided to continue work.

In 1877 it was reported in a discussion of the Walleroo Railway Bill that the Doora Mine was almost abandoned, and little had been done for the last year or two. Since then the price of copper had fallen. On 20 February 1889 the Kadina and Wallaroo Times reported that Wallaroo Mines had purchased the freehold of the Doora Mine and four adjoining section at auction for £1,416 18s.

== Ore ==
The ore stratum exploited by the mine has been named by geologists at different times the Doora Schist, Doora Metasediments or Doora Member of the Wandearah Formation in the Wallaroo Group. It is typified by iron-rich and calcsilicate metasediments. It was formed in the Paleoproterozoic. The U-Pb zircon age of intercalated acid volcanics is 1741±9 Ma. The copper mines around Moonta and Kadina, including Doora Mine, produced excellent specimens of the mineral atacamite (formula: Cu_{2}Cl(OH)_{3}), which has been adopted as the official emblem of the Mineralogical Society of South Australia.

== Sources ==
- Bottrill, Ralph (2009-03-31). "Atacamite".
- Cowley, Wayne; Conor, Colin; Zang, Wenlong (April 2003). "New and revised Proterozoic stratigraphic units on northern Yorke Peninsula" (PDF). MESA Journal.
- Government of South Australia (2015), Place Names of South Australia: Dirty Light - Dry Creek
- Howard, Les (2009-03-13). "Light railway locations in South Australia, the Northern Territory and around Broken Hill (NSW)" (PDF). Light Railway Research Society of Australia Inc. South Australian Group.
- MacColl, Norman, ed. (1873-03-08). "Science Gossip". The Athenaeum: A Journal of Literature, Science, the Fine Arts, Music, and the Drama. J. Francis. p. 316.
- "Mining". The Kadina and Wallaroo Times. 1889-02-20. Archived from the original on 2016-03-04.
- Society of Arts (1873). "The Australian Court at the International Exhibition". Journal of the Society of Arts. The Society.
- "South Australia". West Coast Times. 1874-04-21.
- South Australia Parliament (1878). Proceedings of the Parliament of South Australia: With Copies of Documents Ordered to be Printed ..
- "Topics of the Day". The South Australian Advertiser. Adelaide. 1871-02-25 [1870-12-12].
