= Brucefield =

Brucefield may refer to:

- Brucefield, South Australia, a locality east of Tickera in Australia
- Brucefield, Fife, near Dunfermline in Scotland
- Brucefield, Ontario, a community in Bluewater in Canada
