= Willamulka, South Australia =

Locality in South Australia

Willamulka South Australia
- Coordinates: 33.92°S 137.87°E
- Population: 65 (SAL 2021)
- Postcode(s): 5554
- Elevation: 64 m (210 ft)
- Location: 11 km (7 mi) northeast of Kadina; 19 km (12 mi) southwest of Bute
- LGA(s): Copper Coast Council; Barunga West Council
- State electorate(s): Narungga
- Federal division(s): Grey
Localities around Willamulka:
Wallaroo Plain	Alford
	Willamulka
Kadina	Thrington	Thomas Plain

Willamulka is a locality at the top of Yorke Peninsula in South Australia. It is on the road between Kadina and Bute. Its name is derived from an Aboriginal word meaning "shiny green stone" (copper ore).

Willamulka is also located on the former railway line between Kadina and Brinkworth. It closed to regular traffic in 1993. Tourist trains last used the line in 2009.

The Willamulka Bible Christian church opened on 21 December 1885 and became a Methodist church in 1901. It is located on the corner of Willamulka and Church Roads, east of the modern boundary of the locality. It closed in May 1977.
