= Kadina and Wallaroo Times =

Defunct newspaper in South Australia

Front page of the first issue of Kadina and Wallaroo Times, 1 August 1888

The Kadina and Wallaroo Times was a newspaper published in Kadina, and also serving the nearby Wallaroo, South Australia from August 1888 to August 1966. In 1968 the paper merged to form the Yorke Peninsula Country Times.

== History ==
With the 1861 discovery of copper at a property in the northern Yorke Peninsula, the town of Kadina quickly grew to 8,000. Brothers David and Andrew Fyfe Taylor, and George Thompson Clarkson founded the newspaper in the nearby port of Wallaroo in 1865. The newspapers mainly focused on reporting the happenings in these two towns and nearby Moonta. Editorial opinion was generally politically conservative and supportive of free trade. It opposed miners' strikes and in particular opposed to Premier Charles Kingston. Some early editions of the paper contained articles written in Welsh. "In 1870 South Australian Parliament debated the newspaper's 'contempt of this House.' The unpopular MP and newspaper owner, Ebenezer Ward, reputedly charged the newspaper with libel three times. However the outspokenness of the Times in the 1860s and 1870s stopped after this and particularly from 1878 under the editorship of David Bews."

Historically, its origin was the Wallaroo Times and Mining Journal, published from 1 February 1865 to 31 December 1881, then the Wallaroo Times from 4 January 1882 to 28 July 1888. It became Kadina and Wallaroo Times on 1 August 1888, when the paper moved its offices from Wallaroo to Kadina. From 1966 it became the Kadina, Wallaroo and Moonta Times, then following a merger with the South Australian Farmer in 1968 the paper became the Yorke Peninsula Country Times.

== Preservation ==
For the period of August 1888 (Volume 24, no. 2574) to March 1966 (Volume 101, no. 10,172) the newspaper title has been preserved on microfilm by the State Library of South Australia. This collection has been digitised and available online up to December 1954 as part of the Australian Newspapers Digitisation Program of the National Library of Australia.

== See also ==
- Harry Kneebone
