= Hancock's Billiard Saloon =

Heritage-listed building in Kadina, South Australia

Coordinates: 33°57′45″S 137°42′48″E

Hancock's Billiard Saloon is a heritage-listed former billiard saloon and barber shop at 36-38 Taylor Street, Kadina, South Australia. It is also known as Hancock's Barber Shop and Humphries Barber Shop. It was listed on the South Australian Heritage Register on 28 May 1987 and on the former Register of the National Estate on 1 November 1983.

== History ==
Hancock's Billiar Saloon was built in 1906 by shoemaker Charles Whitbread as a one-storey building containing two shops. In 1907, Whitbread sold the building to barber Fred Hancock, who moved his business from its previous premises across the street. The second-floor billiard room, also operated by Hancock, was added in September 1914, with three large tables and raised platforms capable of accommodating up to fifty spectators. The addition was designed by Firmin Jenkins of Port Pirie and built by S. Edevyan. In later years, the saloon was carried on by its owner while the ground floor shops were leased out. The saloon closed in the 1960s. The bottom-left shop was later used by barber Don Humphries for many years; Humphries had been in business in Taylor Street since at least 1953.

The Register of the National Estate listing stated that the building was significant historically because "it reflects a period in the development of Kadina based on agricultural expansion in the northern Yorke Peninsula", architecturally as "a rare example of [its] building type, reflecting the social (male) ideals of the period [and] is an early and excellent example of the use of industrialised building materials", and environmentally as "a relatively intact building which was an important social landmark [and] still an important visual landmark which establishes and continues the historic character of Kadina."

It appeared endangered in the 1980s, with a local historian speculating that it may "fall into the street" despite its interest and describing it as "now a refuge for homeless pigeons", while the National Estate noted that though it was "structurally sound", "all external timber work [was] in neglected and poor condition. The building was subsequently renovated, and in recent years has housed two cafes and two florists at various times.

A painting of the building appeared on the cover of several reprints of the Phyllis Somerville novel Not Only In Stone.
