= North Beach =

North Beach may refer to:

== Places ==
=== Australia ===
- North Beach, South Australia, a locality
- North Beach, Western Australia, a suburb of Perth

=== South Africa ===
- North Beach, Durban, about the residential area in central Durban
- North Beach (Durban), about the beach proper

=== United States ===
- North Beach, San Francisco, California
- North Beach, Indian River County, Florida, a former census-designated place in Indian River County
- North Beach, Miami Beach, the northern section of the city of Miami Beach, Florida
- North Beach, Maryland, a town on the western shore of Chesapeake Bay, in Calvert County
- North Beach, Oregon, an unincorporated community
- North Beach, Corpus Christi, Texas, a neighborhood
- North Beach, a community in Long Beach Township, New Jersey

== Other uses ==
- North Beach (album), a 2006 compilation jazz album by Vince Guaraldi
- North Beach (film), a 2000 film co-directed by and starring Richard Speight, Jr.
- North Beach, a former amusement park and beer garden in Queens, New York; it closed with Prohibition and is now part of LaGuardia Airport

== See also ==
- Northern Beaches, area in the northern coastal suburbs of Sydney, New South Wales, Australia
