= Hundred of Tiparra =

Tiparra
- Cadastral division
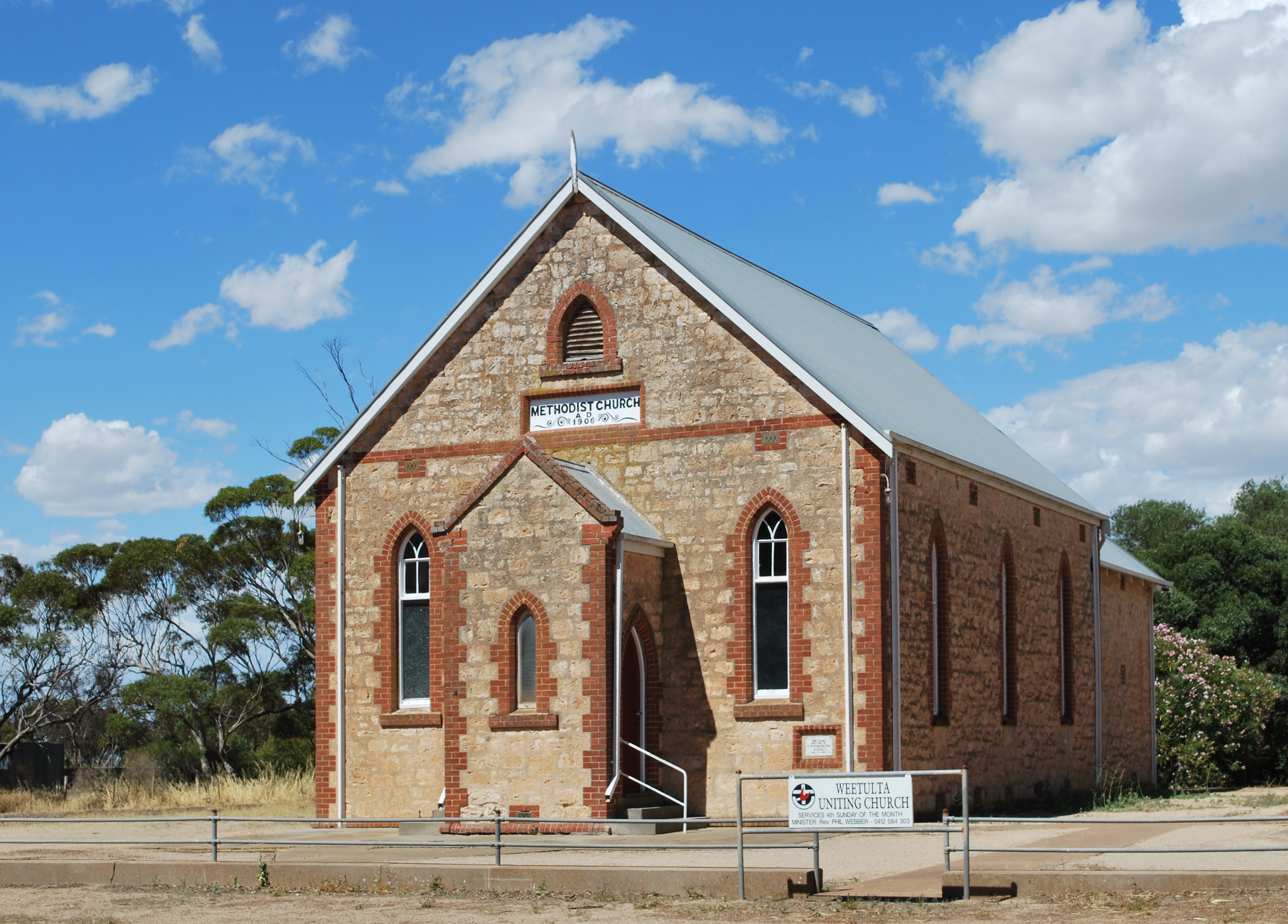
- Early 20th century church at Weetulta in the south west of the hundred

- Coordinates: 34.188°S 137.710°E
- Country: Australia
- State: South Australia
- Region: Yorke Peninsula
- LGA(s): Yorke Peninsula
- Established: 12 June 1862

Area
  - Total: 690 km^{2} (268 sq mi)
- County: Daly
Lands administrative divisions around Tiparra
Spencer Gulf	Wallaroo; Kadina	Kulpara
Spencer Gulf	Tiparra	Clinton
Spencer Gulf	Kilkerran; Maitland	Cunningham

The Hundred of Tiparra is a cadastral unit of hundred located in the Mid North of South Australia. It is one of the 16 hundreds of the County of Daly and was proclaimed by Governor Dominick Daly in 1862.

The main town in the hundred is Arthurton with the localities of Nalyappa, Agery, Sunnyvale and Weetulta also lying within the hundred.

== Local government ==
The District Council of Clinton was established in 1878 at Clinton and, in 1888, it annexed the Hundred of Tiparra by promulgation of the District Councils Act 1887, bringing the hundred under local administration for the first time. In 1987 the Clinton district council was merged into the District Council of Central Yorke Peninsula. Ten years on in 1997 the same area was amalgamated with three other local councils spanning Yorke Peninsula into the new unified District Council of Yorke Peninsula.
