= The Pioneer (South Australia) =

- Owner: Ben L. Wilkinson
- Launched: 21 January 1898
- Ceased publication: 1969
- City: Yorketown, South Australia
- Country: Australia
- ISSN: 2204-8200

The Pioneer was a weekly newspaper published in Yorketown, South Australia, from March 1898 until June 1969, when it absorbed the Maitland Watch and was renamed to Yorke Peninsula News Pictorial. For thirty years an opposition newspaper, the Clarion (7 June 1902 - 21 May 1931), existed in the town, too.

== History ==
The Southern Yorke's Peninsula Pioneer was first published on 21 January 1898, and sold at a discounted price due to its late appearance. It was originally owned and established by Ben L. Wilkinson, and later helped by his brother Richard, in Yorketown. In Issue 10, on 25 March that year, the newspaper adopted a simpler title, The Pioneer.

In 1969, the newspaper absorbed the Maitland Watch (22 December 1911 - 26 June 1969), and became the short-lived Yorke Peninsula News Pictorial (3 July 1969 - 28 May 1970), which was then incorporated into the Yorke Peninsula Country Times from June 1970.

== Digitisation ==
With the exception of a few missing issues, the newspaper digitisation program of the National Library of Australia has digitised photographic copies of The Pioneer from its inception to 24 December 1954. The State Library of South Australia carried microform copies of the newspaper (shelved as S. Y. P. Pioneer) from its inception to December 1960.
