= Yorke Peninsula Country Times =

Weekly newspaper in South Australia

Yorke Peninsula Country Times is a weekly South Australian newspaper, which was first published on 4 September 1968. It was formed by the merging of Kadina, Wallaroo and Moonta Times and South Australian Farmer, representing numerous former publications dating back to 1865.

== History ==
Yorke Peninsula Country Times was created following a merger between Kadina, Wallaroo and Moonta Times and South Australian Farmer in August 1968. As a result, the newspaper's website traces its origins through 13 previous publications back to February 1865.

=== Kadina, Wallaroo and Moonta Times ===
This publication evolved through a number of changes, namely:

- Wallaroo Times and Mining Journal (1 February 1865 - 31 December 1881)
- Wallaroo Times (4 January 1882 - 28 July 1888)
- Kadina and Wallaroo Times (1 August 1888 - March 1966)
  - In 1966, the newspaper merged with Moonta People's Weekly (29 September 1961 - 31 March 1966), which itself was a renamed version of an older publication, The People's Weekly (17 May 1890 - 22 September 1961).
- Kadina, Wallaroo and Moonta Times (7 April 1966 - 29 August 1968)

=== South Australian Farmer ===
This publication evolved through a number of changes, namely:

- Yorke's Peninsula Advertiser and Miners' News (4 October 1872 - 29 December 1874)
- Yorke's Peninsula Advertiser and Miners' and Farmers' Journal (1 January 1875 - 9 July 1878)
- Yorke's Peninsula Advertiser (12 July 1878 - 28 July 1922)
- Yorke Peninsula Farmer (29 June 1923 - 20 January 1933)
- Farmer (27 January 1933 - 19 December 1947)
- South Australian Farmer (9 January 1948 - 28 August 1968)

In June 1970, the combined newspaper then absorbed the short-lived Yorke Peninsula News Pictorial (1969–1970), which was formed following the merger of The Pioneer (1898–1969) and Maitland Watch (1911–1969).

It is headquartered in Goyder Street, Kadina and its weekly editions (published Tuesdays) are distributed across "the entire peninsula" from Port Broughton in the north to Stenhouse Bay in the south.
