= Wallaroo (disambiguation) =

A wallaroo is a medium-sized marsupial found in Australia. It can also be:

== Places ==
- Wallaroo, New South Wales, a rural locality near Canberra in New South Wales in Australia
- Wallaroo, Queensland, a rural locality in the Central Highlands Region
- Wallaroo, South Australia (disambiguation), articles associated with the town and locality
- Wallaroo, Western Australia a town in Australia

== Ships ==
- HMS Wallaroo (1890), a Pearl-class cruiser active off Australia before World War I
- HMAS Wallaroo, a Bathurst-class corvette sunk in a collision during World War II
- Wallaroo, a Sydney K-class ferry

== Rugby football ==
- Wallaroo FC, a Sydney rugby union football club 1870 to 1899
- The "Wallaroos", the Australia women's national rugby union team
