= Kadina Cemetery =

Cemetery in South Australia

Coordinates: 33°56′52″S 137°42′34″E

Kadina Cemetery is a heritage-listed cemetery in Drain Road, Kadina, South Australia. It was listed on the South Australian Heritage Register on 28 November 1985 and on the former Register of the National Estate on 1 November 1983. It is managed by the District Council of the Copper Coast.

A cemetery reserve was surveyed adjacent to Drain Road, near the old trotting track, in 1861, and the first occupant was buried there in September that year; however, the cemetery was soon relocated to the present site and the graves there reburied due to concerns about the original location. The Kadina Cemetery had been established to replace an earlier pioneer cemetery at Wallaroo Mines, where 28 people had been buried. In March 1862, mine manager Gavin Young ordered the removal of remains from the pioneer cemetery to the new Kadina Cemetery, as the old ceremony was likely to be encroached upon by the mines; it is not known how many graves were actually removed.

A management committee was established in January 1866, but a fire in 1867 destroyed all the cemetery's early records. Cemetery records now date from 26 October 1867. The mortuary was built by Thomas Robert Heath in 1875. Paths were laid out and trees planted around this time, while the cemetery had already been encircled by a stone wall. Control of the cemetery passed to the Corporate Town of Kadina in May 1932.

== Interments ==
- John Fennescey
- Mary Jane Fennescey
