= Kadena =

Kadena may refer to:

- Kadena, Okinawa, a town in Japan
- Kadena Air Base

== People with the surname ==
- Reon Kadena, Japanese model and actress

== See also ==
- Kadeena Cox, British parasport athlete
- Kadina (disambiguation)
- Cadena (disambiguation)
