= David Bews =

Australian politician

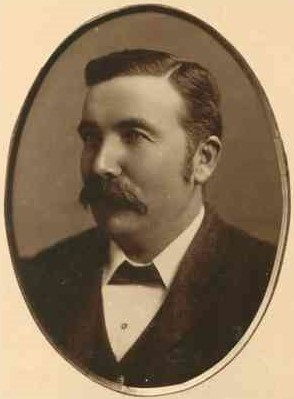

David Bews (April 1850 – 24 February 1891) was a newspaper editor, politician in colonial South Australia and Minister of Education. He was a member of the South Australian House of Assembly from 1885 until his death in 1891, representing the electorate of Wallaroo.

Bews was born near Kirkwall, in the Orkney Islands of Scotland, and went to South Australia with his parents the following year. In 1853, during the gold rush in Victoria, his family removed to that colony, but only to return one year later. Bews' father then engaged in farming operations near Port Elliot, and afterwards near Adelaide. Bews was educated at Allen Martin's school in Port Adelaide then worked as a farmer until he reached the age of majority, when he secured a position as clerk with the Kadina & Wallaroo Railway Company. He subsequently became goods manager, but seven years later (in 1878), when the Government took over the line, he left the service to work for the Kadina and Wallaroo Times. He soon became editor of the newspaper, serving in that position for the rest of his life. He was mayor of the Corporate Town of Wallaroo from 1880 to 1882, besides which he was a member of the Yorke's Peninsula Board of Main Roads and the School Board of Advice.

Bews was elected to the South Australian House of Assembly on 16 February 1885, at a by-election following the resignation of Henry Allerdale Grainger; he had previously contested and lost the seat at the 1884 election. Bews was re-elected on 19 March 1887, and at the 1890 election. In August of that year he accepted the office of Minister of Education in Thomas Playford II's Government. Bews, who had been appointed one of the South Australian delegates at the Postal Convention, died in Melbourne whilst en route to Sydney on 24 February 1891. A memorial fountain in honour of Bews was constructed in 1893.
