= Peter Allen (Australian politician) =

Australian politician (died 1925)

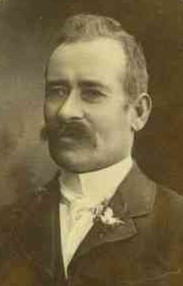

Peter Allen (c. 1855 – 22 October 1925) was an Australian politician. He was a farmer and a correspondent for the Adelaide Advertiser before entering politics. He was a member of the South Australian House of Assembly, representing Wallaroo from 1902 to 1912 and Yorke Peninsula from 1915 to 1925 as a representative of the Farmers and Producers Political Union, the Liberal Union and Liberal Federation. He contested the 1891 Wallaroo by-election.

Prior to entering state politics, he was chairman of the District Council of Green's Plains, and was the first chairman of the District Council of Kadina from 1888 to 1891.
