= District Council of Green's Plains =

Coordinates: 34°00′47″S 137°50′54″E

The former District Council of Green's Plains

The District Council of Green's Plains was a local government area in South Australia from 1871 to 1888. It was the first local government on the Yorke Peninsula.

It was proclaimed on 20 July 1871 under the District Councils Act 1858, following a memorial signed by 32 local residents as required under the Act. It comprised parts of the cadastral Hundreds of Kadina and Kulpara, and was named after early sheep station Green's Plains established by John Green in 1851.

It had five councillors at its inception, with Richard Renfrey, John Reid, James Hosking, Daniel Skipworth and John Scoble appointed the first councillors in the founding proclamation. In the early 1880s, the council undertook a program of building reservoirs to secure water supply along with the adjoining District Council of Clinton and District Council of Kulpara.

It was the subject of some controversy in 1883 when it was revealed that in an unusual arrangement, it shared the same clerk, Kadina resident James Wiltshire, with the Kulpara and Clinton councils. The colonial government exercised their powers to audit the accounts of a district council for the first time, but Wiltshire "positively refused to produce the books" to the colonial Audit Commissioners. Upon the intervention of the Commissioner of Crown Lands with the chairman, Wiltshire produced the books, which were discovered to be "six months in arrears and without vouchers". The Audit Commissioners described the council's accounts as "very unsatisfactory in several respects" and requested that the council's books be sent to Adelaide, but after they did not arrive, "found that Mr. Wiltshire had been for some time pretending they had been sent to us." When the books finally arrived, the Audit Commissioners found that they "had been kept so badly they involved a very large amount of labour to unravel, and the result shows a large debit balance, which will require explanation." The council was denied their subsidy for that year, and denied further subsidies so long as Wiltshire remained clerk; he would subsequently resign in early 1884. The council's auditors also received strong criticism when the report on the matter was tabled before the House of Assembly. The Yorke's Peninsula Advertiser labelled the Green's Plains council "the worst in the colony in the eyes of the Audit Commissioners" and claimed the councillors had been "bamboozled and humbugged by their paid officer".

It was abolished from 5 January 1888 following the passage of the District Councils Act 1887, which established a much broader District Council of Kadina covering the Green's Plains area. The abolition was met with continued local opposition, with residents arguing that they had "no sympathy with Wallaroo or Kadina", and variously suggesting as alternatives that they should stand alone or be joined with some combination of the District Council of Kulpara, District Council of Clinton and District Council of Ninnes.

The last chairman of the District Council of Green's Plains, Peter Allen, subsequently became the first chairman of the District Council of Kadina, and later a long-serving state MP.

== Chairmen ==
- John Reid (1879)
- W. L. Belling (1884)
- Peter Allen (1887)
