= Matta Flat, South Australia =

Matta Flat
- Town
- Coordinates: 33.974°S 137.705°E
- Country: Australia
- State: South Australia
- LGA: Copper Coast Council

Government
  - State electorate: Narungga
  - Federal division: Grey

Population
  - Total: 82 (SAL 2016)
- Postcode: 5554
Localities around Matta Flat
Kadina	Kadina	Kadina
Wallaroo Mines	Matta Flat	Jerusalem
Kadina	Jerusalem	Jerusalem

Matta Flat is a suburb of the town of Kadina on the Yorke Peninsula. It is located in the Copper Coast Council. The boundaries were formally gazetted in January 1999, although the name had long been in use for the area.

== History ==
It was the location of the Matta Matta Mine, which operated from 1860 until 1870. In the 1860s, the mining company built an "elaborate underground drain" to remove mine seepage water from the low-lying Matta Flat area. The historic Matta House, now operated by the National Trust of South Australia as part of The Farm Shed Museum, was built just south of the mine as a house for mine manager Edward Austin Horn. Later, in 1871, the Matta Flat area was surveyed as one of four "occupation blocks" to meet high demand for housing near Wallaroo Mines. The Matta enginehouse chimney was demolished in May 1932, leading a newspaper correspondent to complain about the demolition of local landmarks.
