= Kadina, New South Wales =

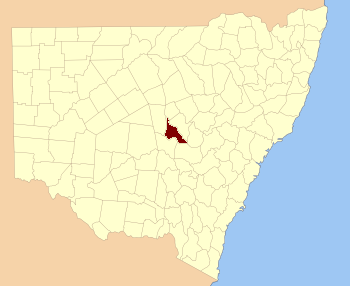
Kennedy County NSW.

Kadina, located north of Alectown, New South Wales at 32°52′54″S 148°18′04″E, is a rural locality in Parkes Shire.

There was a school there, from 1888 to 1914.
