= Wallaroo Plain, South Australia =

Wallaroo Plain South Australia
- Coordinates: 33.866950°S 137.676940°E
- Population: 51 (SAL 2021)
- Established: 1999
- Postcode(s): 5556
- Time zone: ACST (UTC+9:30)
  - Summer (DST): ACST (UTC+10:30)
- Location: 148 km (92 mi) north-west of Adelaide city centre; 13 km (8 mi) north of Wallaroo
- LGA(s): Copper Coast Council
- State electorate(s): Narungga
- Federal division(s): Grey
| Mean max temp | Mean min temp | Annual rainfall |
| 23.8 °C; 75 °F | 9.8 °C; 50 °F | 330.1 mm 13 in |
Suburbs around Wallaroo Plain:
| Spencer Gulf | Tickera | Tickera; Alford |
| Spencer Gulf | Wallaroo Plain | Wallaroo; Willamulka |
| Spencer Gulf; North Beach | Wallaroo; Kadina | Willamulka |
- Footnotes: Distances; Coordinates; Climate; Adjoining localities

Wallaroo Plain is a locality in the Australian state of South Australia located on the west coast of Yorke Peninsula immediately adjoining Spencer Gulf about 148 kilometres (92 miles) north-west of the state capital of Adelaide.

The area's name was derived from the plain which the locality now occupies. Its boundaries were created in January 1999 along with the selection of the name. As of 2014, land within the locality was zoned for agriculture while a strip of land along the coastline adjoining Spencer Gulf was zoned for conservation.

Wallaroo Plain is located within the federal division of Grey, the state electoral district of Narungga and the local government area of the Copper Coast Council.
