= North Beach, South Australia =

North Beach South Australia
- Coordinates: 33.901130°S 137.6295°E
- Population: 676 (SAL 2021)
- Established: 1999
- Postcode(s): 5556
- Time zone: ACST (UTC+9:30)
  - Summer (DST): ACST (UTC+10:30)
- Location: 145 km (90 mi) north-west of Adelaide city centre; 2.6 km (2 mi) north of Wallaroo
- LGA(s): Copper Coast Council
- State electorate(s): Narungga
- Federal division(s): Grey
| Mean max temp | Mean min temp | Annual rainfall |
| 23.8 °C; 75 °F | 9.8 °C; 50 °F | 330.1 mm 13 in |
Suburbs around North Beach:
| Wallaroo Plain | Wallaroo Plain | Wallaroo Plain |
| Spencer Gulf | North Beach | Wallaroo |
| Wallaroo | Wallaroo | Wallaroo |
- Footnotes: Distances; Coordinates; Climate

North Beach is a locality in South Australia located on the west coast of Yorke Peninsula immediately adjoining Spencer Gulf about 145 kilometres (90 miles) north-west of the Adelaide city centre.

== Description ==
North Beach is located within the federal division of Grey, the state electoral district of Narungga and the local government area of the Copper Coast Council. Its boundaries were created in January 1999 for the “long established name” and which includes a private subdivision of Part Sections 925 and 928 of the cadastral unit of the Hundred of Wallaroo, the Pudden Rocks Shack Site and the Wallaroo North Shack Site. Its coastline includes Wallaroo Bay and its northern headland, Point Riley. As of 2014, land use within the locality was zoned for residential accommodation at its northern end and the site of the former Wallaroo North Shack Site at its south end while the coastline adjoining Spencer Gulf and the remainder of the locality's southern end was zoned for conservation.

== See also ==
- North Beach (disambiguation)
