= Corporate Town of Moonta =

Local government area in South Australia

Coordinates: 34°04′00.3″S 137°35′20″E

Seat of the former Corporate Town of Moonta in South Australia

The Corporate Town of Moonta was a local government area in South Australia from 1872 to 1984, centred on the town of Moonta.

== History ==
The town was proclaimed on 1 August 1872, following local debate over the merits of local government earlier in the year. It was divided into four wards: North, East, West and South, each electing two councillors. The new council decided not to build their own town hall for financial reasons, but instead decided to collaborate with the trustees of the Moonta Institute in building a replacement institute building on council-owned land. The new building would include a council chamber and corporation offices, a public hall, a reading room and other facilities. The new institute and council chamber was opened by Governor William C. F. Robinson in September 1885.

The corporation instituted its own electric lighting system and plant in 1917, which replaced the previous privately-run gas system. In June 1932, its boundaries were enlarged alongside widespread local government reform that year, and it gained portions of Moonta Bay, North Moonta, Port Hughes and eleven acres of mineral leases to the east of the town from the District Council of Kadina. A fifth ward (Moonta Bay) was added at this time, increasing the total number of councillors to ten. In 1936, it had an area of 323 acres. It ceased to exist on 1 July 1984 when it amalgamated with the District Council of Kadina to form the District Council of Northern Yorke Peninsula.

== Mayors ==
- Charles Drew (1872-1873)
- Luke Furner (1873-1876)
- Samuel Rossiter (1876-1879)
- Charles Drew (1879-1881)
- Edward Elphick (1881-1883)
- J. J. Beare (1883-1884)
- Thomas James (1886-1888)
- Henry Martin (1888-1889)
- John Symons (1889-1891)
- W. H. Wilkinson (1891-1893)
- James M. Symons (1893-1895)
- H. W. Uffindell (1895-1897)
- George Emerson (1897-1899)
- T. H. Cock (1899-1901)
- William Cowling (1901-1903)
- W. H. Goldsworthy (1903-1905)
- John Snell (1905-1907)
- William Cowling (1907-1909)
- E. Major Jr. (1909-1911)
- Edward Nankivell (1911-1912)
- Stephen Hill (1913-1914)
- E. Major Jr. (1914-1915)
- William Cowling (1915-1916)
- Robert Learmond (1916-1919)
- William Stocker (1920-1922)
- T. H. Hooper (1922-1924)
- Arthur Ross Clayton (1924-1926)
- Leslie Bennett (1927-1930)
- Richard C. Kitto (1930-1933)
- Robert John Hughes (1933-1936)
- Arthur Ross Clayton (1936-1937)
- Alan Thomas Harbison (1937-1939)
- Arthur Ross Clayton (1939-1940)
- Robert John Hughes (1940-1941)
- Alfred Peter Snell (1941-1947)
- Leland Riley Tossell (1947-1954)
- Henry Arthur Douglas (Harry) Dowling (1954-1956)
- Robert Kimberley Butler (1956-1961)
- Francis Rankin Ferguson (1961-1964)
- Alfred Peter Snell (1965-1966)
- Henry Arthur Douglas (Harry) Dowling (1967-1975)
- John Lambert (1975-1979)
- Henry Arthur Douglas (Harry) Dowling (1979-1980)
- Vincent Frederick Bowyer (1980-1981)
- John Lambert (1981-1984)
