= Kadina, South Australia =

Kadina
- Town
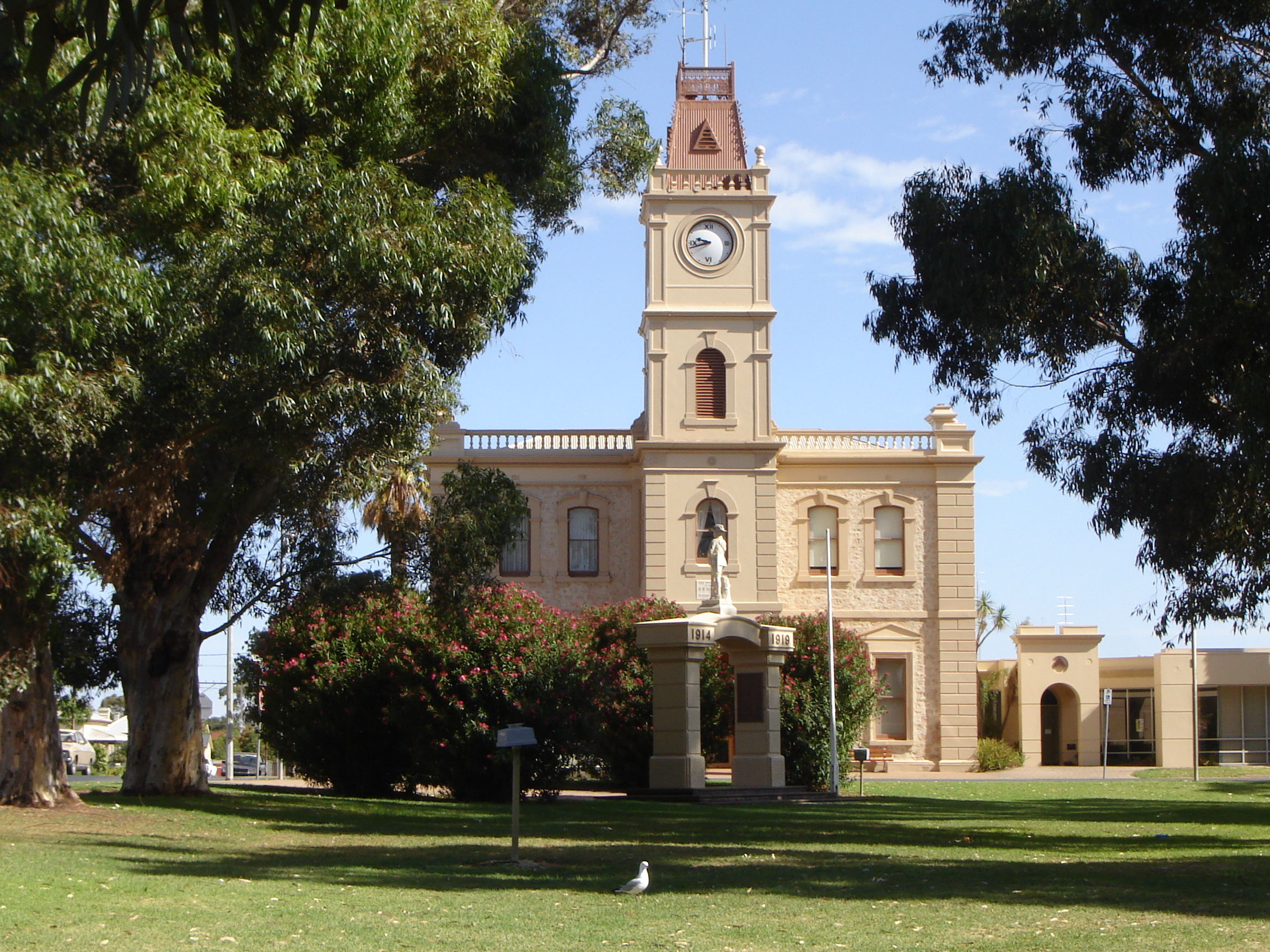
- Kadina Town Hall

- Coordinates: 33°57′45″S 137°42′45″E
- Country: Australia
- State: South Australia
- LGA: Copper Coast
- Location: 144 km (89 mi) NNW of Adelaide
- Established: 1861

Government
  - State electorate: Narungga
  - Federal division: Grey
- Elevation: 44 m (144 ft)

Population
  - Total: 4,666 (UCL 2021)
- Postcode: 5554
- Mean max temp: 23.0 °C (73.4 °F)
- Mean min temp: 10.8 °C (51.4 °F)
- Annual rainfall: 386.7 mm (15.22 in)
Localities around Kadina
Wallaroo	Tickera	Alford
	Kadina	Bute
Moonta	Arthurton	Paskeville

Kadina (/kəˈdiːnə/ kə-DEE-nə) is a town on the Yorke Peninsula of the Australian state of South Australia, approximately 144 kilometres north-northwest of the state capital of Adelaide. The largest town of the Peninsula, Kadina is one of the three Copper Triangle towns famous for their shared copper mining history. The three towns are known as "Little Cornwall" for the significant number of immigrants from Cornwall who worked at the mines in the late 19th century.

Kadina's surrounds form an important agricultural base for the region, and are used for growing cereal crops. Kadina used to be a mining town but now the majority of Kadina's land is used for farming.

== Description ==
Kadina is about 20 kilometres (12 mi) north-east of Moonta and 8 kilometres (5.0 mi) east of the port town of Wallaroo. There are 6 suburbs making up Kadina's township, each being a distinct historic locality or hamlet. These are: Jericho, Jerusalem, Matta Flat, New Town and Wallaroo Mines as well as central Kadina itself. Kadina East was previously a gazetted suburb east of Kadina's centre, later merged into Kadina itself.

== History ==
=== Aboriginal ===
The Narungga are the group of Indigenous Australians whose traditional lands include what is now termed Yorke Peninsula in South Australia. The name "Kadina" is thought to be derived from Kadiyinya, a Narungga word meaning 'Lizard Plain'.

=== European ===
Copper was discovered at Wallaroo Mines in 1859 and adjacent land north east of the site was surveyed in 1861 to house miners and became the Government Town of Kadina. Exceptional amounts of copper were found in the following years. Copper was also found in large amounts at the nearby Matta Mine and Doora Mine. The copper mines attracted a number of highly experienced Cornish miners to Kadina.

In 1862, the Hundred of Wallaroo and Hundred of Kadina were proclaimed in order to allow parcels of land to be sold in the vicinity of the copper mines. In the same year a horse-drawn railway from Kadina to the port at Wallaroo, west of the town, was opened. Further lines connecting Kadina to Port Wakefield, to the southeast, and Bute, to the northeast (Kadina-Brinkworth railway line), opened in 1878 and 1879, respectively.

In 1872 Kadina became a municipality by establishment of the Corporate Town of Kadina. By 1875, the population had increased to 20,000, mostly composed of Cornish miners. In 1907 the adjacent Government Town of Kadina East was surveyed west of Eliza Terrace to cope with the need to house the growing population of the town.

Mining at Kadina ceased completely in 1938, and the rail lines fell into disuse and were closed in 1989.

Historical population
Year	Pop.	±%
1921	2,503	—
1933	2,255	−9.9%
1947	1,744	−22.7%
1954	1,808	+3.7%
1961	1,866	+3.2%
1966	3,022	+62.0%
1971	2,828	−6.4%
1976	2,849	+0.7%
1981	2,943	+3.3%
1986	3,263	+10.9%
1991	3,536	+8.4%
1996	3,589	+1.5%
2001	3,742	+4.3%
2006	4,026	+7.6%
2011	4,470	+11.0%
2016	4,587	+2.6%
2021	4,666	+1.7%
Source: Australian Bureau of Statistics data.

== Heritage listings ==
Kadina has a number of heritage-listed sites, including:

- Drain Road: Kadina Cemetery
- 36-38 Taylor Street: Humphries Barber Shop
- 51 Taylor Street: Kadina Town Hall

== Geography and climate ==
Kadina has a semi-arid climate (Köppen: BSk), with moderately hot, dry summers and cool, wetter winters. The town is above Goyder's Line, and is surrounded by mallee scrub. It is located 8 km (5.0 mi) inland and 44 m (144 ft) above sea level. Temperatures vary throughout the year, with average maxima ranging from 30.5 °C (86.9 °F) in January to 15.5 °C (59.9 °F) in July, and average minima fluctuating between 15.8 °C (60.4 °F) in February and 5.7 °C (42.3 °F) in July. Annual precipitation is rather low, averaging 388.6 mm (15.30 in) between 92.3 precipitation days. There are 122.3 clear days and 102.6 cloudy days annually. Extreme temperatures have ranged from 47.9 °C (118.2 °F) on 24 January 2019 to −2.9 °C (26.8 °F) on 30 August 2019. Extremes were combined from the closed Kadina weather station and the current Kadina AWS station.

Climate data for Kadina (33º57'36"S, 137º42'00"E, 44 m AMSL) (1876-2005 normals, extremes 1957-2024)
Month	Jan	Feb	Mar	Apr	May	Jun	Jul	Aug	Sep	Oct	Nov	Dec	Year
Record high °C (°F)	47.9 (118.2)	45.2 (113.4)	42.1 (107.8)	38.0 (100.4)	30.5 (86.9)	26.1 (79.0)	24.2 (75.6)	29.1 (84.4)	35.0 (95.0)	38.9 (102.0)	44.6 (112.3)	46.0 (114.8)	47.9 (118.2)
Mean daily maximum °C (°F)	30.5 (86.9)	30.1 (86.2)	27.4 (81.3)	23.8 (74.8)	19.3 (66.7)	16.6 (61.9)	15.5 (59.9)	16.6 (61.9)	19.5 (67.1)	22.8 (73.0)	25.8 (78.4)	27.7 (81.9)	23.0 (73.3)
Mean daily minimum °C (°F)	15.7 (60.3)	15.8 (60.4)	13.8 (56.8)	11.3 (52.3)	8.5 (47.3)	7.1 (44.8)	5.7 (42.3)	6.0 (42.8)	7.4 (45.3)	9.4 (48.9)	11.9 (53.4)	13.8 (56.8)	10.5 (50.9)
Record low °C (°F)	6.7 (44.1)	6.7 (44.1)	3.6 (38.5)	1.2 (34.2)	−0.8 (30.6)	−2.8 (27.0)	−2.8 (27.0)	−2.9 (26.8)	−2.6 (27.3)	−0.2 (31.6)	1.3 (34.3)	4.6 (40.3)	−2.9 (26.8)
Average precipitation mm (inches)	14.9 (0.59)	18.2 (0.72)	19.1 (0.75)	32.5 (1.28)	45.8 (1.80)	51.8 (2.04)	48.5 (1.91)	45.3 (1.78)	38.9 (1.53)	33.2 (1.31)	22.5 (0.89)	17.8 (0.70)	388.6 (15.30)
Average precipitation days (≥ 0.2 mm)	3.2	2.9	3.8	6.5	10.0	12.1	13.1	12.6	10.0	8.1	5.6	4.4	92.3
Average afternoon relative humidity (%)	36	37	40	47	59	63	65	60	53	44	40	38	49
Average dew point °C (°F)	11.5 (52.7)	11.7 (53.1)	10.3 (50.5)	9.9 (49.8)	9.6 (49.3)	8.3 (46.9)	7.8 (46.0)	7.5 (45.5)	8.6 (47.5)	7.7 (45.9)	8.3 (46.9)	10.1 (50.2)	9.3 (48.7)
Source: Bureau of Meteorology (1876-2005 normals, extremes 1957-2024)

== Governance ==
Kadina is located within the local government area of the Copper Coast Council, which was formed in 1997. The Copper Coast Council replaced the District Council of Kadina, which existed from 1888 to 1984, and the District Council of Northern Yorke Peninsula. The Corporate Town of Kadina, which had existed since 1872, was previously merged into the District Council of Kadina in 1977.

Kadina is part of the federal division of Grey and lies within the state electoral district of Narungga.

== Local economy ==
=== Mining ===
Kadina was once chiefly a copper mining town with the Wallaroo Mines being south-westerly adjacent to the township. Since the closure of the mine in the 1920s, agriculture has been the dominant local industry.

=== Broadacre cropping ===
Kadina is surrounded by lands used for broadacre cereal cropping. Staples such as barley, wheat as well as various oilseeds and legumes like canola, chickpeas and field peas are commonly grown in the area. Barley and wheat from the region is considered to be some of the best in the world.

=== Tourism ===
The town today consists of important historical colonial and federation buildings gathered around Victoria Square. Kadina also contains the Farm Shed Museum & Tourism Centre (Kadina Heritage Museum) and remnants of the Wallaroo Mines. Kernewek Lowender, a Cornish festival, is held every odd year in May in Kadina (as well as Moonta and Wallaroo, with each location hosting the festival for one day). Kadina and its surrounds benefit generally from the tourism throughout the Copper Triangle and has experienced general growth due throughout the 2000s and 2010s due to the Copper Cove housing development at Wallaroo.

== Transport ==
The Copper Coast Highway passes through Kadina. The town was formerly the Junction of the now disused Balaklava–Moonta railway line with the Kadina–Brinkworth line. Both of these lines closed to regular service in 1993, with the Wallaroo to Kadina section of former converted to a rail trail in 2009. Nearby Kadina Airport caters to small private aircraft and emergency services.

== Media ==
The town serves as the base for local radio station Gulf FM, broadcasting at 89.3 FM. The Yorke Peninsula Country Times newspaper is based in Kadina.

== Notable people ==
- Oliver Badman (1885–1977), politician
- Richard Champion (b. 1968), former AFL footballer
- Lynton Crosby (b.1957), political strategist
- John Olsen (b. 1945), former South Australian Premier and South Australian Federal Senator
- Rex Pearson (1905–1961), politician
- Steve Prestwich (1954–2011), musician
- Cameron Sutcliffe (b.1992), AFL Footballer
- Horace Wilson (1864–1923), cricketer
- Leslie Heath (1902–1957), politicians

== Gallery ==
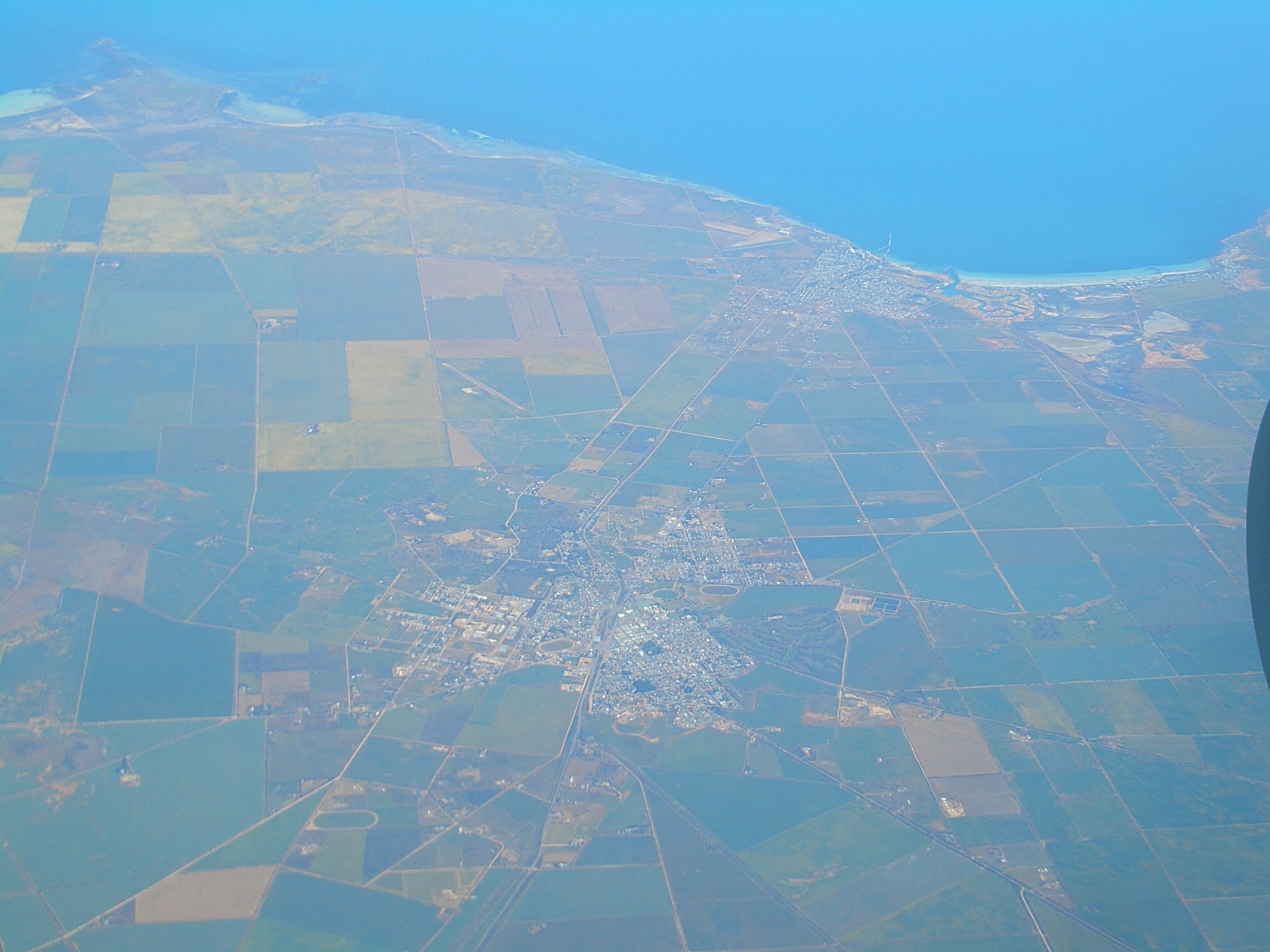
Aerial view of Kadina (centre, inland), looking west toward Spencer Gulf

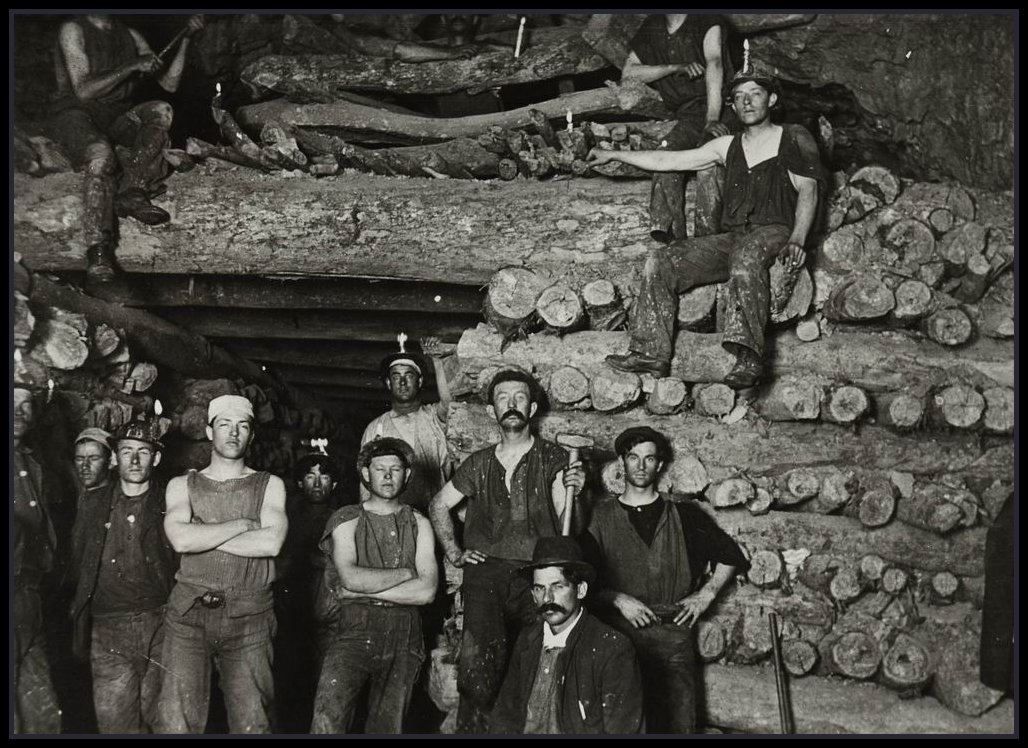
Miners, 1900

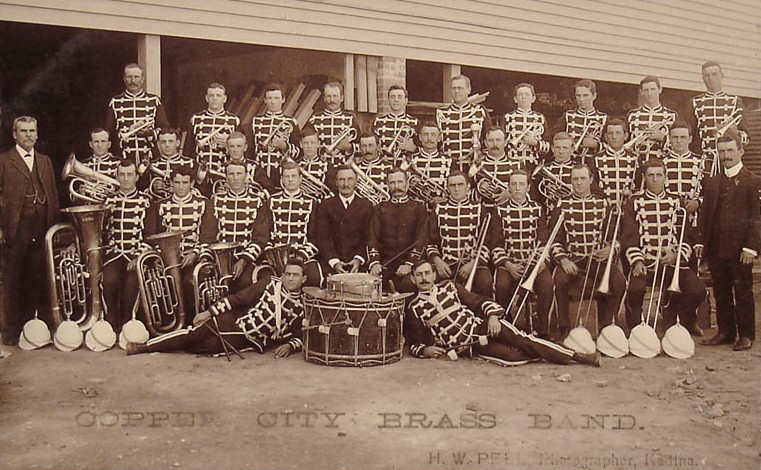
Copper City Brass Band, 1907

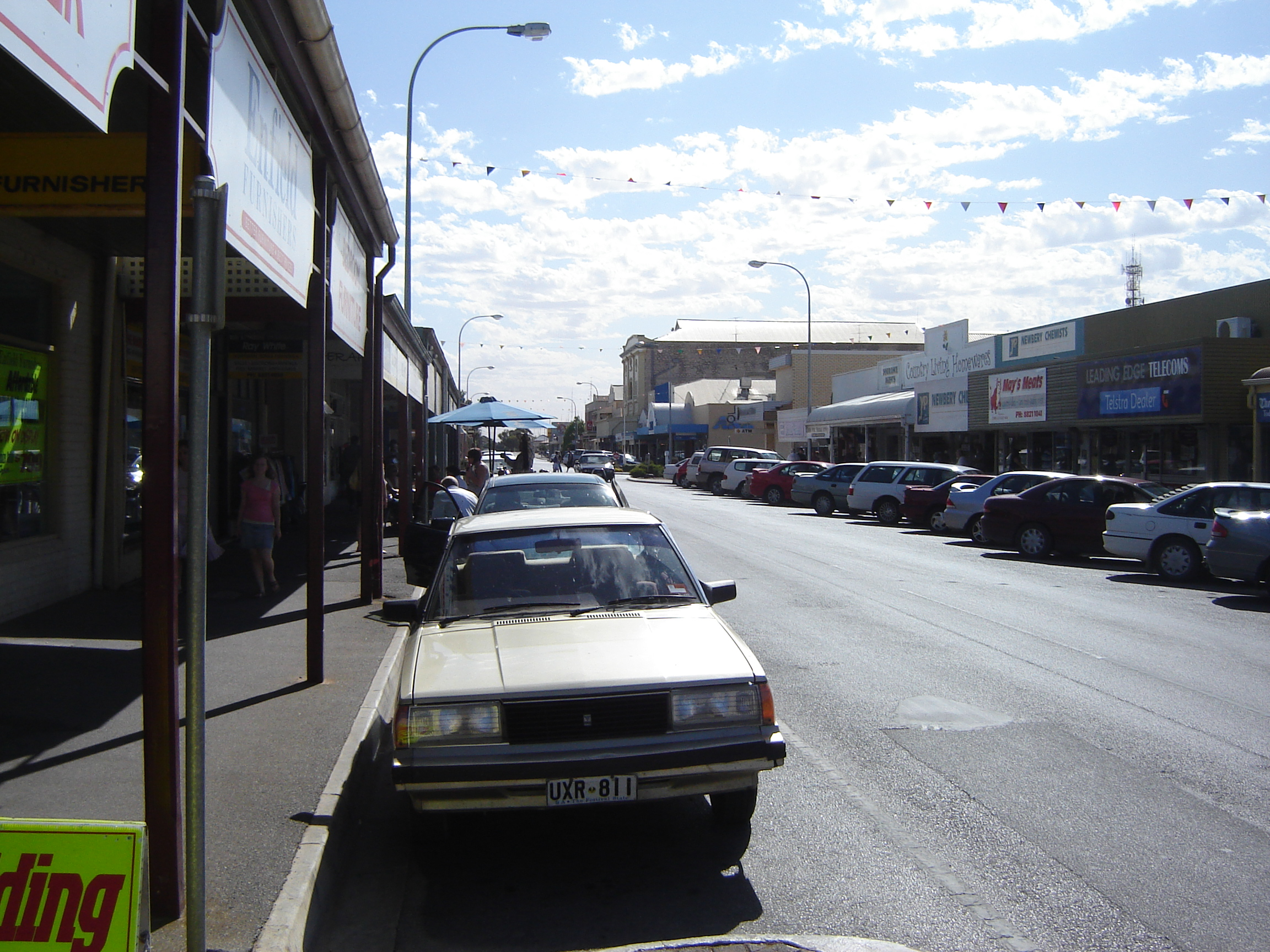
Shops in Graves Street, Kadina

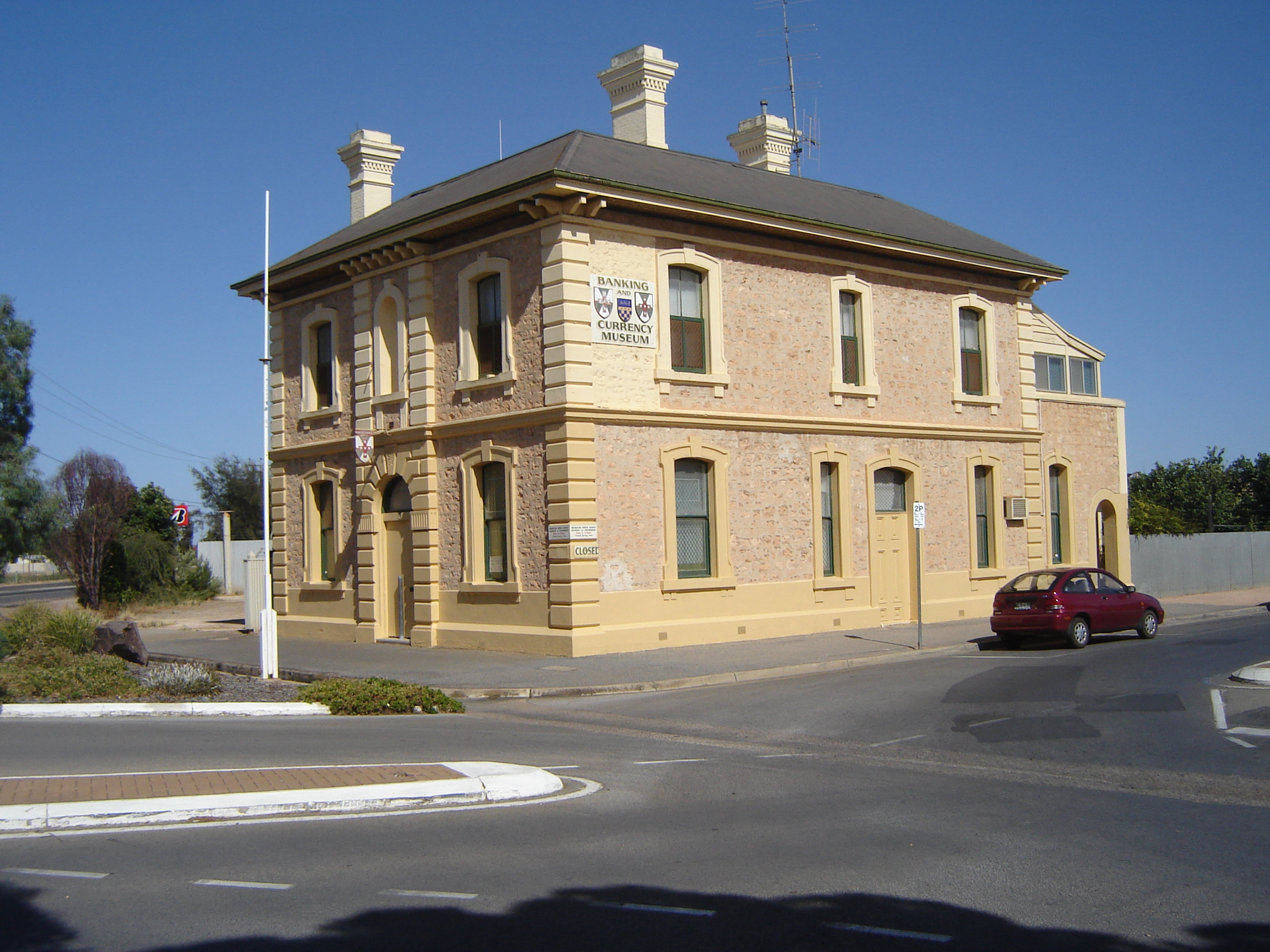
Banking & Currency Museum

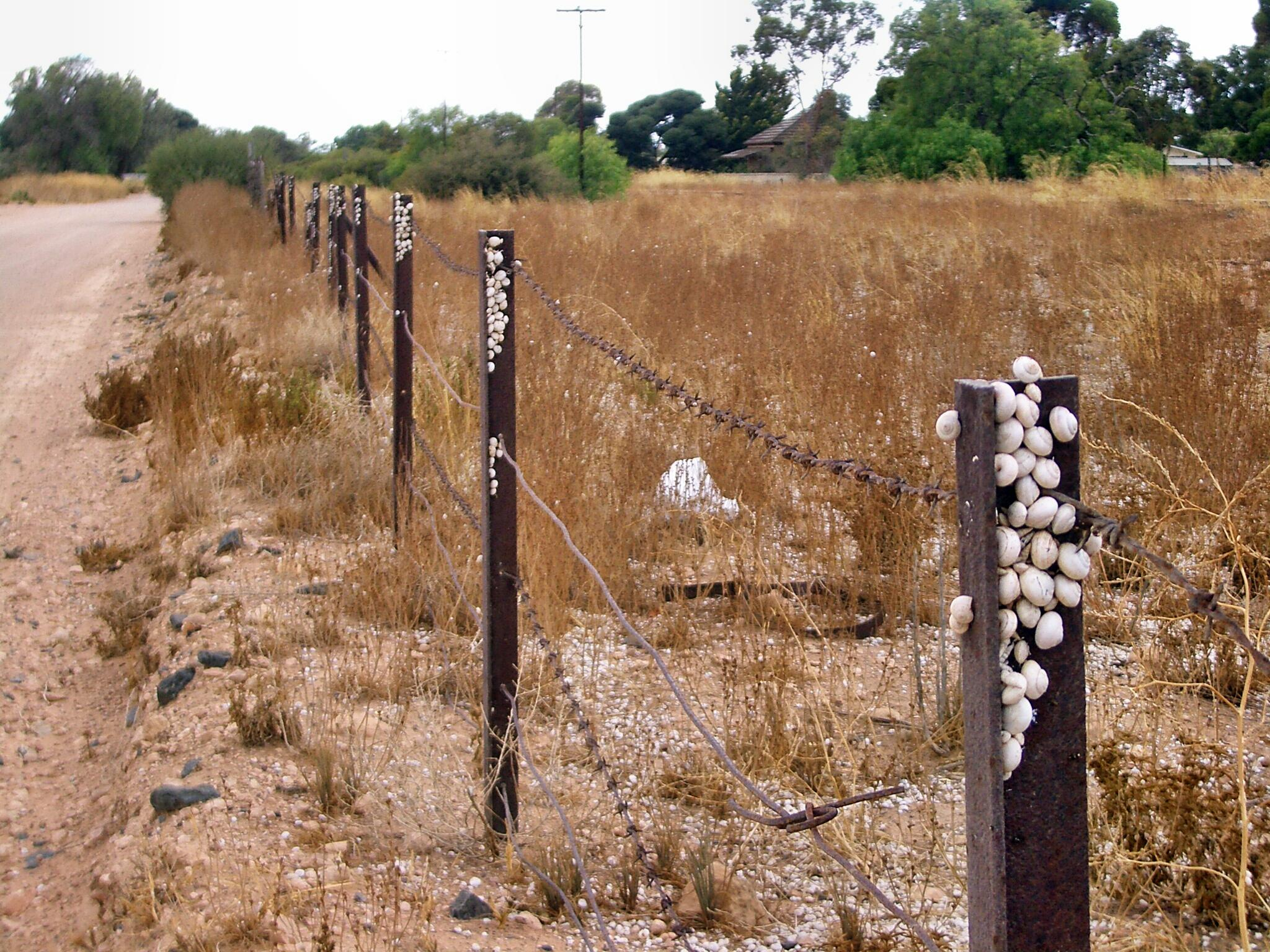
Introduced snails

== See also ==
- Wallaroo, South Australia
- Moonta, South Australia
- Cornish emigration
- Kernewek Lowender
