= Jerusalem, South Australia =

Jerusalem South Australia
- Coordinates: 33.979630°S 137.710830°E
- Population: 424 (SAL 2021)
- Postcode(s): 5554
- LGA(s): Copper Coast Council
- State electorate(s): Narungga
- Federal division(s): Grey
Localities around Jerusalem:
Matta Flat	Kadina	Kadina
Matta Flat	Jerusalem	Kadina
Kadina	Kadina	Kadina
- Footnotes: Coordinates

Jerusalem (originally New Jerusalem) is a suburb of the town of Kadina on the Yorke Peninsula. It is located in the Copper Coast Council. The boundaries were formally gazetted in January, 1999, although the name had long been in use for the area.

== History ==
It was surveyed in 1871 as a result of demand for housing from those involved in the nearby Wallaroo Mines, forming one of four "occupation blocks" in the area. An old resident claimed that the suburb was intended for "gentleman's residences" as opposed to the other occupation blocks, and that a "Councillor Rosenberg" had suggested Jerusalem as a name for an "aristocratic suburb". In 1874, the local newspaper stated that "the name is not considered suitable to the place, and generally strikes the ear of a stranger as somewhat ridiculous", while the local Bible Christian minister stated that "dog-fighting, wombat and wallaby-hunting were the regular Sunday exercises, and sin had stamped its wretched impress upon the whole neighbourhood."

A Bible Christian chapel opened at Jerusalem in February 1874. The main Jerusalem football team merged with the Kadina club in 1908, and the "Jews" football and cricket teams were later based at Jerusalem in the 1920s, competing in the local Kadina competitions. The Jerusalem Methodist Church opened in January 1922, built by voluntary labour on a block of land donated by the Wallaroo and Kadina Mining Company. The Jerusalem Sunday School began in March of the same year. Prior to the church's opening, the Wallaroo Mines Gospel Mission Band had been holding open-air and cottage meetings at Jerusalem for three years. It remains in operation as the Jerusalem Uniting Church.
