= Kadina Town Hall =

Heritage-listed town hall in South Australia

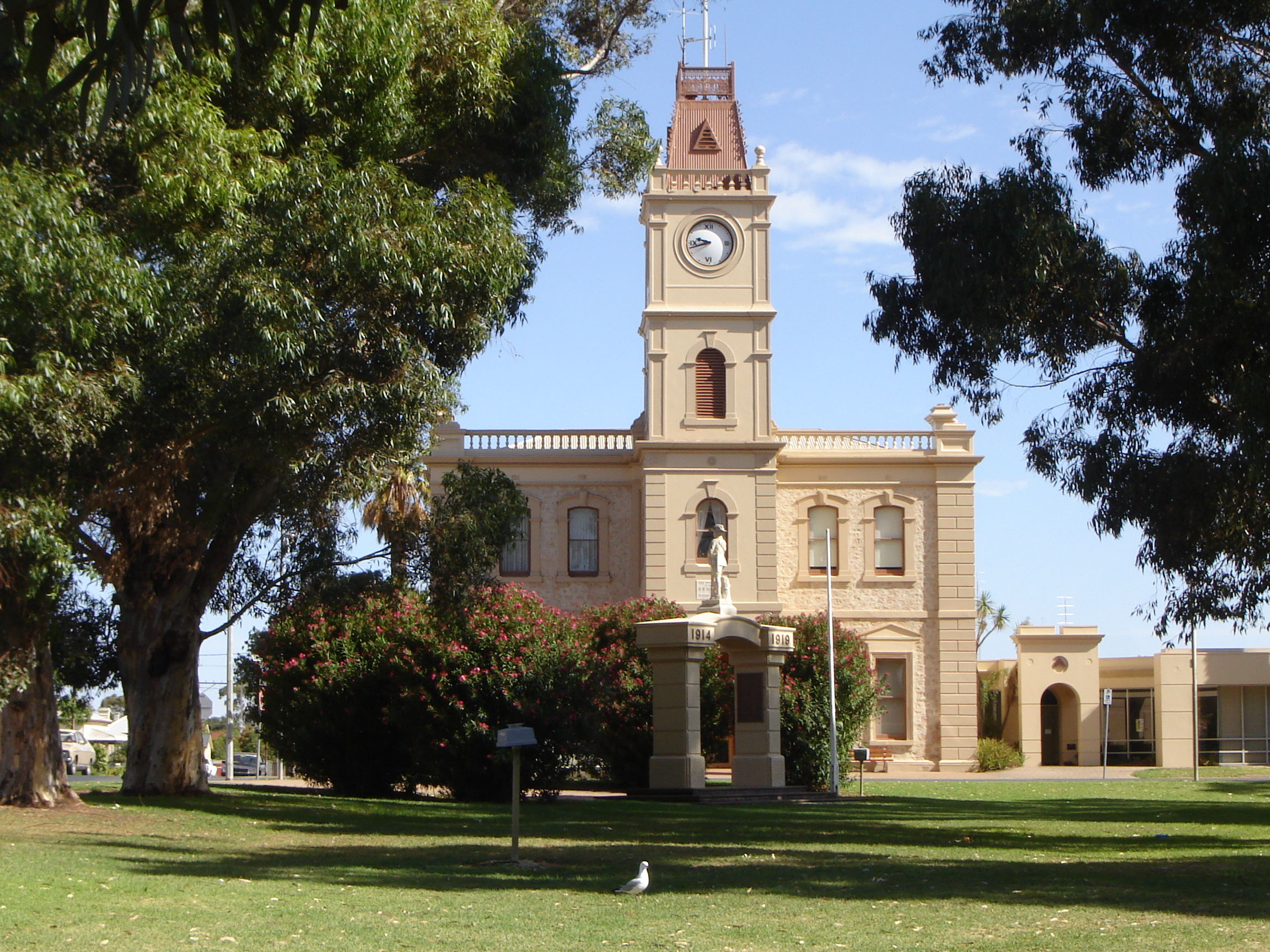
- The Town Hall in 2006
- Location: 51 Taylor Street; Kadina SA 5554
- Coordinates: 33.9618°S 137.7147°E
- Built: 1880
- Architect: John Gaskell
- Governing body: Copper Coast Council

South Australian Heritage Register
- Type: State Heritage Place
- Designated: 4 March 1993
- Reference no.: 13512

Register of the National Estate
- Type: Historic
- Designated: 1 November 1983
- Reference no.: 6770

Kadina Town Hall is a heritage-listed town hall at 51 Taylor Street, Kadina, South Australia. It was listed on the South Australian Heritage Register on 4 March 1993 and on the former Register of the National Estate on 1 November 1983. It is now managed by the District Council of the Copper Coast, who operate out of a modern extension to the building.

== Description ==
The first section of the building opened in 1880 as the permanent premises of the Kadina Institute. The institute had opened on 11 September 1871 in rented premises unflatteringly described as an "old shed", then shifted to an old shop in Graves Street in 1878. The institute committee had originally tendered for an architect in 1877 and had selected Adelaide architect Rowland Rees, but had rejected his plans; instead, John Gaskell was appointed architect, resulting in a one-storey, 30 ft by 20 ft and 26 ft high building, at a cost of £478. The foundation stone was laid on 28 April 1880 and the building opened on 28 July.

In 1882, Gaskell was also appointed to design an extension to the institute for a hall. It was built by William Hancock and opened by Governor William C. F. Robinson in June 1863, having cost £2,600. The institute committee struggled to make repayments on the extension loan, and in 1889 transferred the building to the Corporate Town of Kadina, at which time it became the Kadina Town Hall. The second storey was added in 1898 by contractors Grigg and Son, with two large rooms for a council chambers and library and a smaller room for a mayor's parlour; prior to this one councillor had reportedly complained that the town hall "looked like a bond store". The balcony and an ornamental gable were added at this time.

The clock tower was constructed in 1903 by W. H. Stocker to the design of T. R. Heath, and was built from stone and brick to a height of 65 ft. The clock itself had been donated by businessman Daniel Squibb, while the town council borrowed and increased rates to fund the cost of the tower. The tower opened in July of that year, and following its completion, Squibb paid the council for the entire cost of the tower.

The gallery in the hall itself was built in 1914 after concerns about insufficient seating; while the council were unable to finance it directly, they instead funded the project through private subscription of local businessmen. It was built by Bill Milliken from October that year and opened on 6 December. A roll of honour commemorating those who enlisted in World War I was unveiled on 4 December 1916. The hall was enlarged and extended 20 ft north in 1933 by builders Hedley Trenwith and Langdon Bros, and funded as a joint project between the council and the federal government as part of Great Depression relief efforts. The 1933 extension completed the heritage components of the building.
