= Tickera, South Australia =

Tickera South Australia
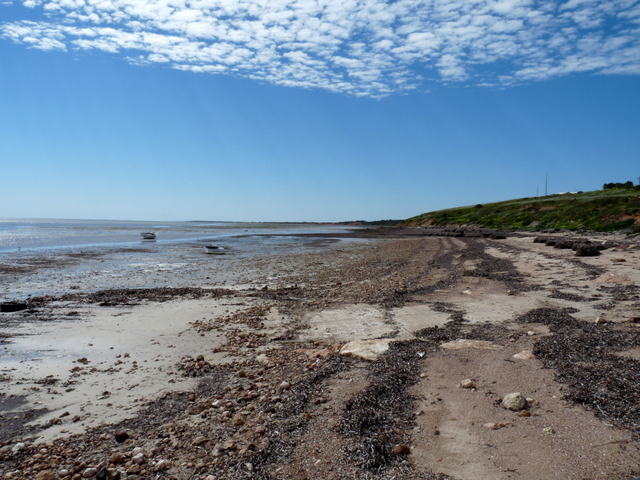
- Beach looking north from Tickera

- Coordinates: 33.7870°S 137.713°E
- Population: 194 (SAL 2021)
- Postcode(s): 5555
- Location: 150 km (93 mi) north of Adelaide city centre; 20 km (12 mi) north of Wallaroo
- LGA(s): District Council of Barunga West; Copper Coast Council
- State electorate(s): Narungga
- Federal division(s): Grey
Localities around Tickera:
Spencer Gulf	Spencer Gulf	Ward Hill
Spencer Gulf	Tickera	Alford
Wallaroo Plain	Wallaroo Plain	Alford
- Footnotes: Location; Adjoining localities

Tickera is a settlement in the Australian state of South Australia on the northern Spencer Gulf coast of Yorke Peninsula. It is located 20 km north of Wallaroo by road.

== Description ==
Tickera is a fishing town. The majority of the population are professional fishermen. Tickera is also known as "The Crab Capital of the Spencer Gulf". It is known as the crab capital because many fishermen fish for crabs in Tickera.

While fishing for crabs it is common for small sharks to follow fishermen in order to steal the crabs from the net. The shores are very shallow.

It was surveyed in 1882, but experienced neither significant growth nor stability until the early 1970s. At this time, people started considering Tickera for holiday home purchases and retirement prospects.

== History ==
The Tickera school opened in 1887, but the first teacher resigned on 30 September 1887 and the new teacher was not appointed until May 1892. There was another school at the locality of Brucefield half-way from the town of Tickera to Alford. The Inspector-General considered that Tickera and Brucefield schools were too close to both be supported by the Education Department. The school at Brucefield opened as "Tickera West" in 1883 and changed name to "Brucefield" in 1885. It closed in 1886. As there were only nine students at Brucefield at the time, the Minister for Education did not feel justified to appoint a replacement teacher. There was community discussion about which school should be kept. The Tickera school closed in 1933.

A Methodist church was built in 1889. The Tickera Hotel opened in September 1884, but was closed in October 1905 when it was purchased by the temperance movement.

== Gallery ==
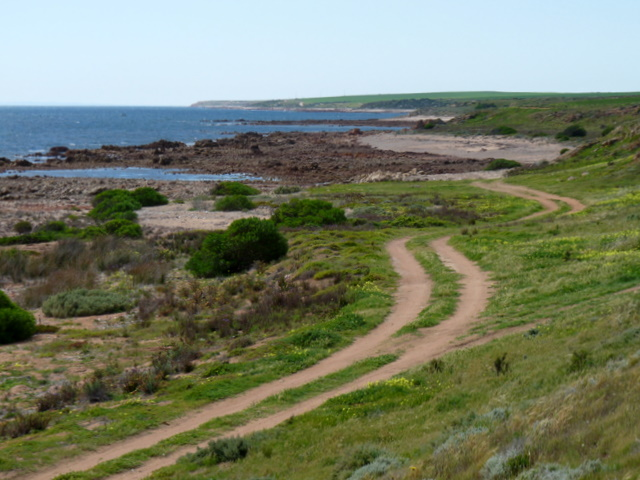
Coastline

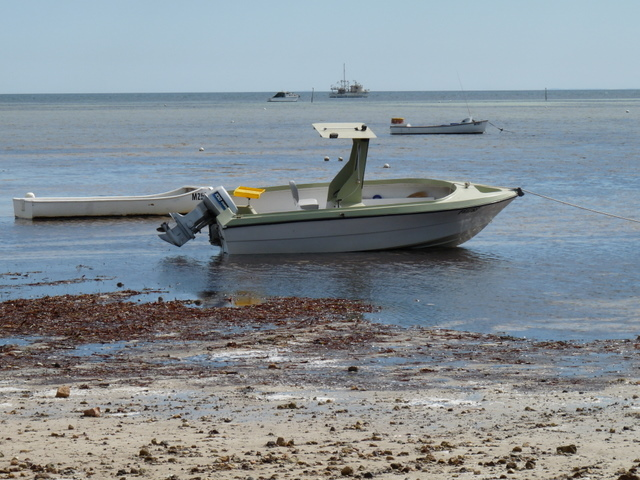
Local boats
