= Copper Coast =

Region of South Australia

Coordinates: 34.119763°S 137.491150°E

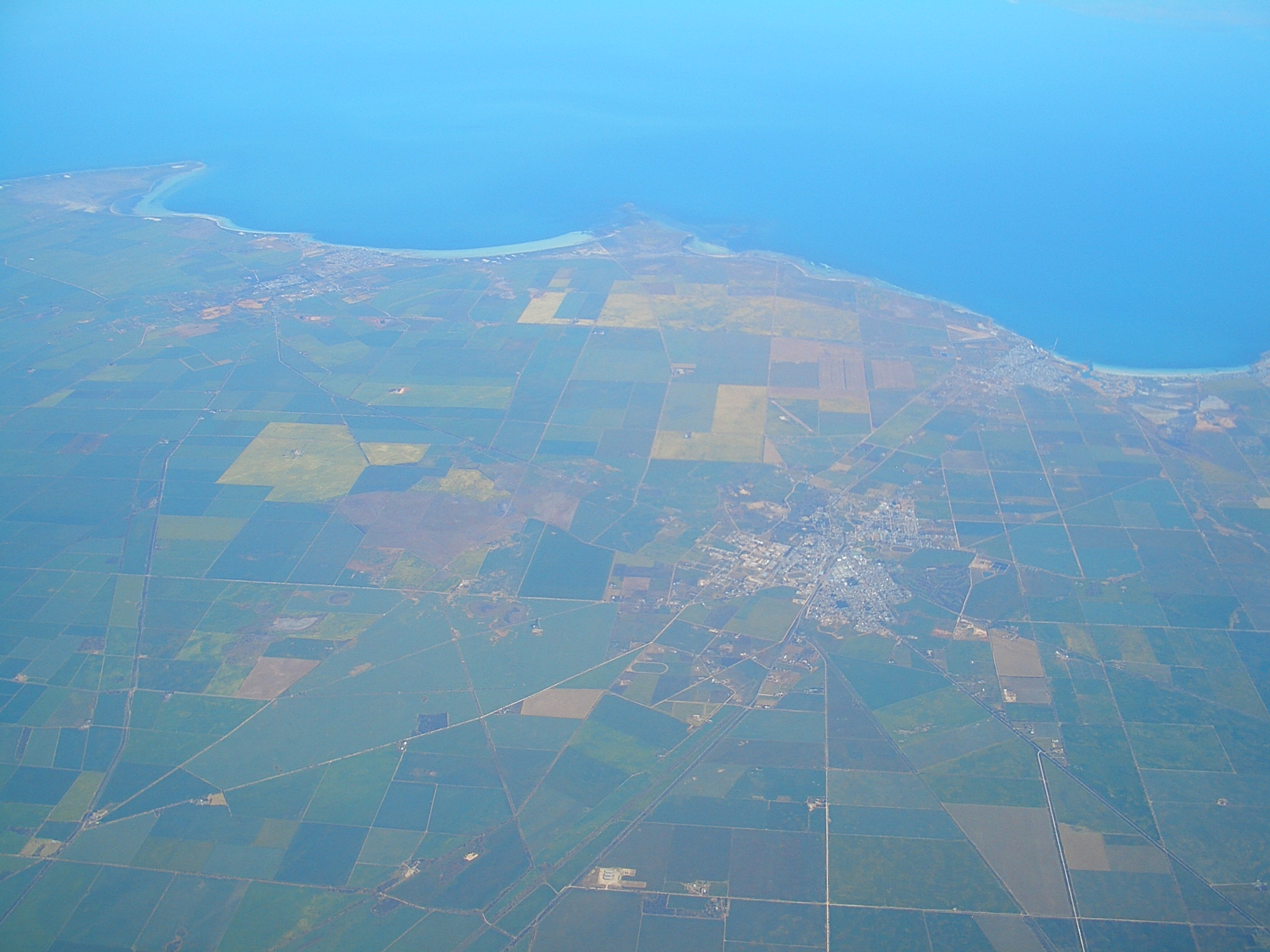
Aerial view of the Copper Triangle, looking roughly west, toward Spencer Gulf. Kadina is in the center (inland), Wallaroo and Moonta on the coast (right and left, respectively)

Copper Coast is a region of South Australia situated in Northern Yorke Peninsula and comprising the towns of Wallaroo, Kadina, Moonta, Paskeville and Port Hughes. The area approximately bounded by Wallaroo, Kadina and Moonta is also known as the Copper Triangle. The area is so named because copper was mined from there in the late 19th and early 20th centuries, a significant source of economic prosperity for South Australia at the time. These three towns are known for their large Cornish ethnicity, often called "Little Cornwall". Kernewek Lowender is the world's largest Cornish Festival, held biennially in the Cornish Triangle. The area continues to make a significant contribution to the economy of South Australia, as a major producer of grain, particularly barley and wheat.

== History ==
Copper was first noted on the Yorke Peninsula by Captain Richard Rodda in 1848, however due to the remoteness of the region in comparison with the mines of Kapunda and Burra, it was not exploited. The Yorke Peninsula was unsettled until the mines were established. In December 1859 copper was first discovered at the Wallaroo Mines and at the Moonta Mines in 1861, when Paddy Ryan found copper traces coming out of a wombat's burrow which was on a pastoral lease granted to Walter Watson Hughes. Hughes formed the Tipara Mining Company, which later became the Moonta Mining Company. By the late 1800s, Moonta had the largest urban population outside of Adelaide, with 12,000 people, including many Cornish miners and their families who brought with them their skills, and lifestyle. Much of the character of this period was captured by local cartoonist Oswald Pryor (1881–1971), son of a Cornish miner. Later, agriculture became more important to the region's economy from the 1880s onward. The region has been able to sustain its agricultural productivity as it is below the Goyder Line.

== Local economy ==
The Copper Coast's urban centres of Kadina, Wallaroo and Moonta form the core of Yorke Peninsula's retail sector. In recent years, the population of the region has grown significantly. Several new housing developments have taken place, including Patrick's Cove at Port Hughes, Copper Cove Marina at Wallaroo, and the Dunes at Port Hughes, which includes the first golf course designed by Greg Norman to be constructed in Australia. Wallaroo Shores Estate on the foreshore of Wallaroo is currently underway, and predicted to be the largest beachfront residential development in South Australia.

The coastal towns of the Copper Coast are popular destinations for tourists, particularly from Adelaide, as well as from regional areas of South Australia. The remains of the historic mines can be inspected, including the ruins of the old copper smelter at Wallaroo and the old Moonta mines. Fishing is a popular recreational activity. There are several local jetties. Also, there are boat ramps available to launch a boat to fish in the local waters. The biennial Kernewek Lowender is a major tourist attraction in May of each odd numbered year. Besides tourism, the major local industry is grain production, particularly barley and wheat, with a major grain export facility at Wallaroo.

== Local government ==
The local government is the Copper Coast Council, which was formed in May 1997 as a result of the amalgamation of the District Council of Northern Yorke Peninsula and the Corporation of the Town of Wallaroo. The council seat is in Kadina, and there are council branch offices in Moonta and Wallaroo.

== Historic sites and museums ==
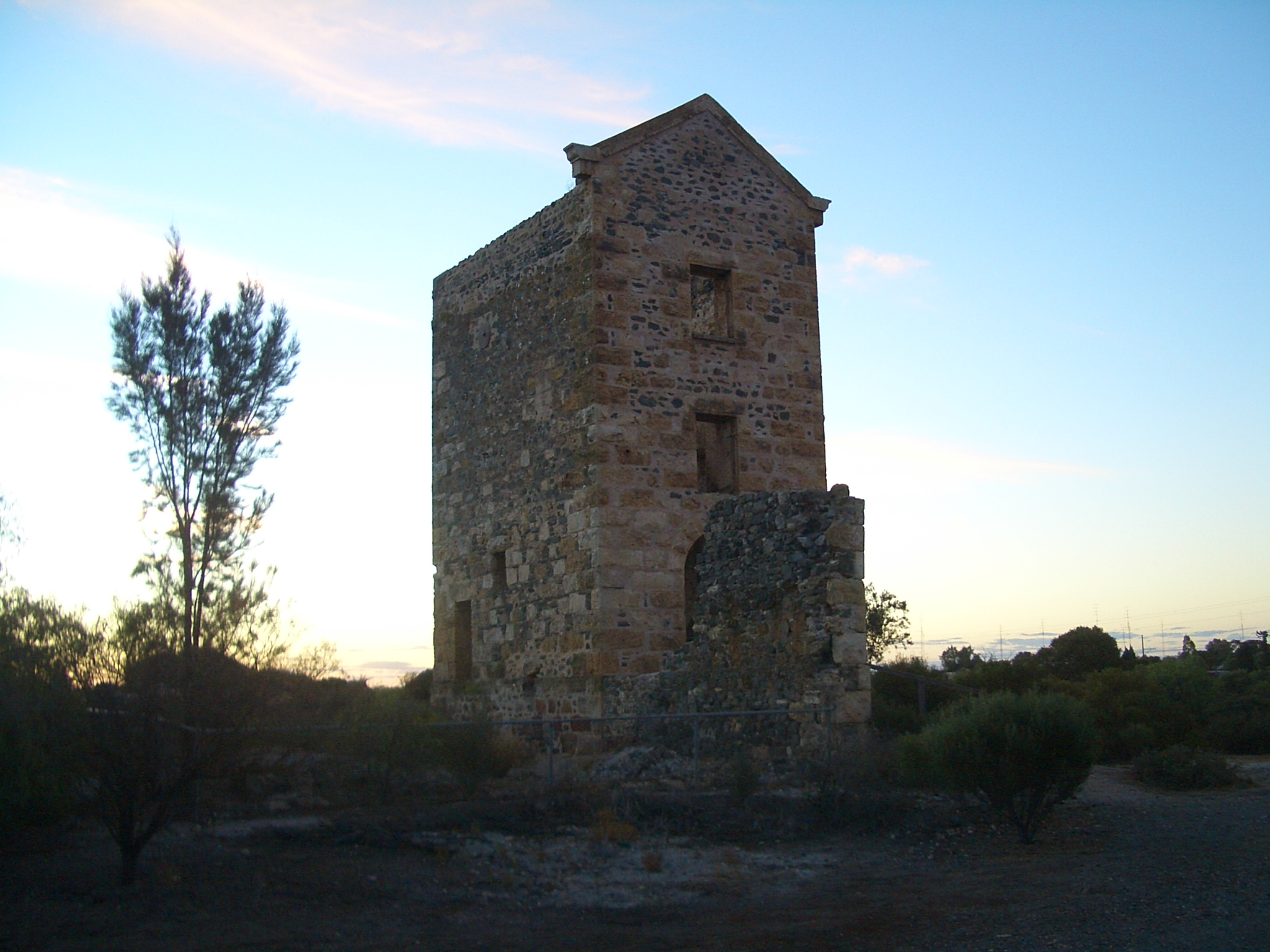
At the Wallaroo Mines site

Remains of the Cornish mining heritage continue to be evident, including stone cottages constructed by the miners, and the remains of mine sites, including Hughes' Engine House and Richman's Engine House. Information on local Heritage walks and drives can be obtained from the Copper Coast Visitor Information Centre in Kadina, the Moonta Tourist Outlet or the Wallaroo Information Outlet. Several museums have been established in the area to preserve the local heritage, including:

- The Farm Shed Museum - located at the Copper Coast Visitor Information Centre at 50 Moonta Road in Kadina and built around Matta Matta House, the original house for mines manager Edward Horn. Matta Matta house has been refurbished to the late Victorian period when the local copper mining industry was at its peak. The museum brings together some of the developments and practices of dry land farming. This museum records the history of local agriculture (including development of the stump-jump plough).
- Wallaroo Mines—a historical site of the abandoned copper mines just southeast of Kadina.
- Moonta Mines Museum—located in the former Moonta Mines Model School (which was established in 1878)

== Scuba diving and snorkelling ==
The Copper Coast is home to three historic jetties which are popular among scuba divers and snorkellers. Wallaroo and Port Hughes jetties are considered two of the best scuba diving sites in South Australia. Moonta's jetty has features an enclosed area where people can swim without fear of shark visitation.

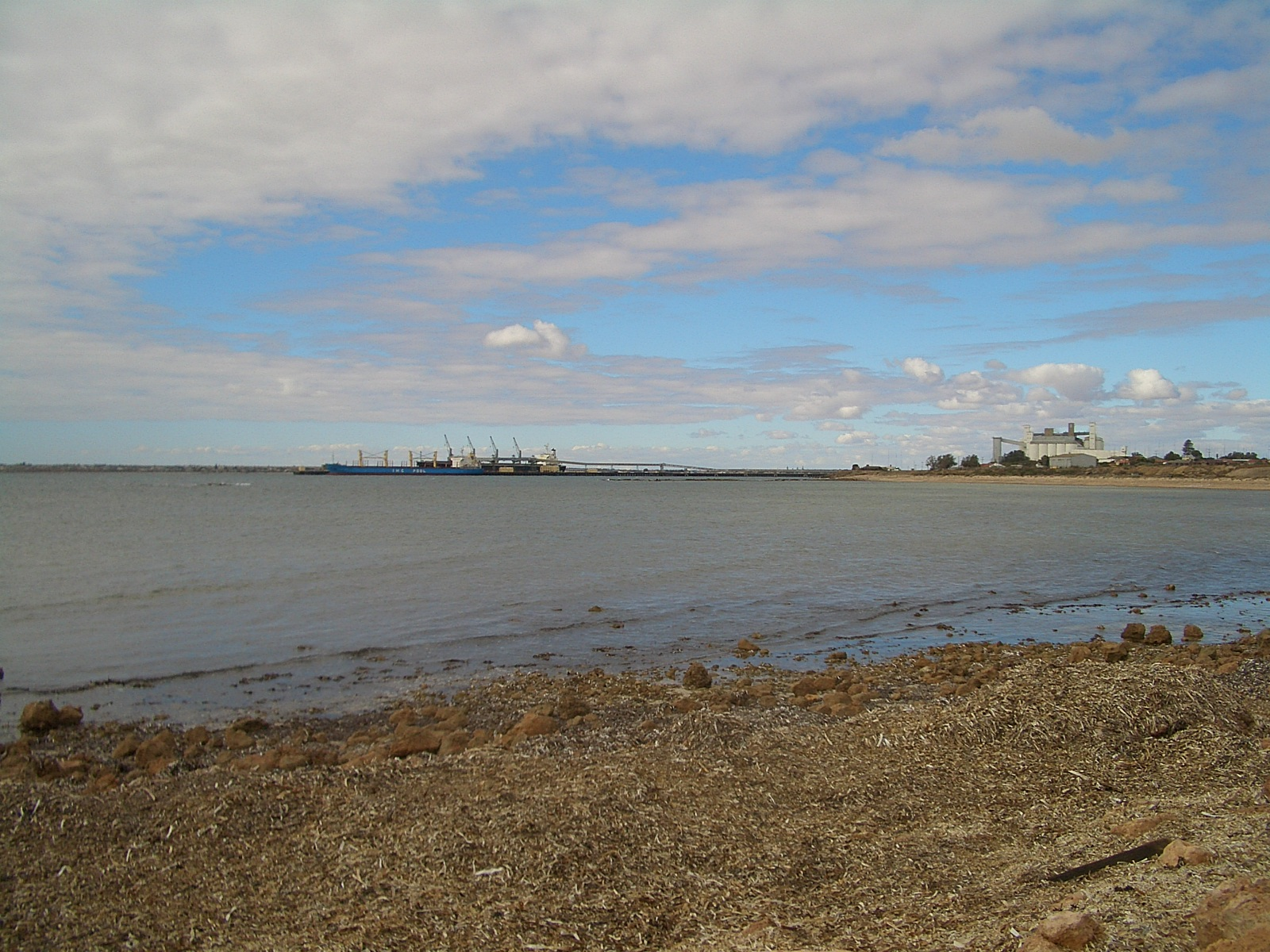
The port of Wallaroo, with its grain terminal
