= District Council of Northern Yorke Peninsula =

Former local government area of South Australia

Coordinates: 33°57′45″S 137°42′55″E

Seat of the former District Council of Northern Yorke Peninsula in South Australia

The District Council of Northern Yorke Peninsula was a local government area in South Australia from 1984 to 1997. The council seat was at Kadina.

== History ==
The District Council of Northern Yorke Peninsula was formed on 1 July 1984 with the amalgamation of the District Council of Kadina and the Corporate Town of Moonta. It covered an area of 748 square kilometres, including the towns of Kadina, Moonta, North Beach and Paskeville. It consisted of five wards: Kadina, Moonta Rural, Moonta Township, Paskeville and Wallaroo. The area had a population of 6,060 as of the 1981 census, and its primary industries were reported in 1986 as being cereal grain production, wool and fishing.

It ceased to exist on 3 May 1997 when it merged with the Corporate Town of Wallaroo to form the District Council of the Copper Coast.

== Chairmen ==
- Graham Dale Morphett (1984–1987)
- Ashley Gottlieb Schilling (1987–1991)
- Graham William Wearn (1991–1995)
- William Ivan Oates (1995–1997)
