= New Town, South Australia =

New Town South Australia
- Coordinates: 33.954°S 137.693°E
- Population: 1,291 (SAL 2021)
- Postcode(s): 5554
- LGA(s): Copper Coast Council
- State electorate(s): Narungga
- Federal division(s): Grey
Localities around New Town:
Kadina	Kadina	Wallaroo
Kadina	New Town	Kadina
Kadina	Wallaroo Mines	Kadina
- Footnotes: Coordinates

New Town (originally Newtown) is a suburb of the town of Kadina on the Yorke Peninsula. It is located in the Copper Coast Council. The boundaries were formally gazetted in January 1999, although the name had long been in use for the area.

== History ==
It is unclear when the suburb was established: Keith Bailey wrote that it "was settled as early as 1865", but little was reported until 1872, at which time it was noted that "several nice residences" were being built in the township. It once featured "two churches (Primitive Methodist and Wesleyan), a soap factory, two stores, three fruiterers, a wheelwright and a wine shop", as well as a small brickworks, lime kiln and butcher's slaughterhouses.
