= Jericho, South Australia =

Jericho South Australia
- Coordinates: 33.970°S 137.683°E
- Population: 17 (SAL 2021)
- Postcode(s): 5554
- LGA(s): Copper Coast Council
- State electorate(s): Narungga
- Federal division(s): Grey
Localities around Jericho:
Kadina	Kadina	Wallaroo Mines
Kadina	Jericho	Wallaroo Mines
Kadina	Kadina	Kadina
- Footnotes: Coordinates

Jericho is a suburb of the town of Kadina on the Yorke Peninsula. It is located in the Copper Coast Council. The boundaries were formally gazetted in January 1999, although the name had long been in use for the area. It was surveyed in 1871 as one of four "occupation blocks" to meet high demand for housing near Wallaroo Mines.
