= Corporate Town of Wallaroo =

Local government area in South Australia

Coordinates: 33°55′0″S 137°37′0″E

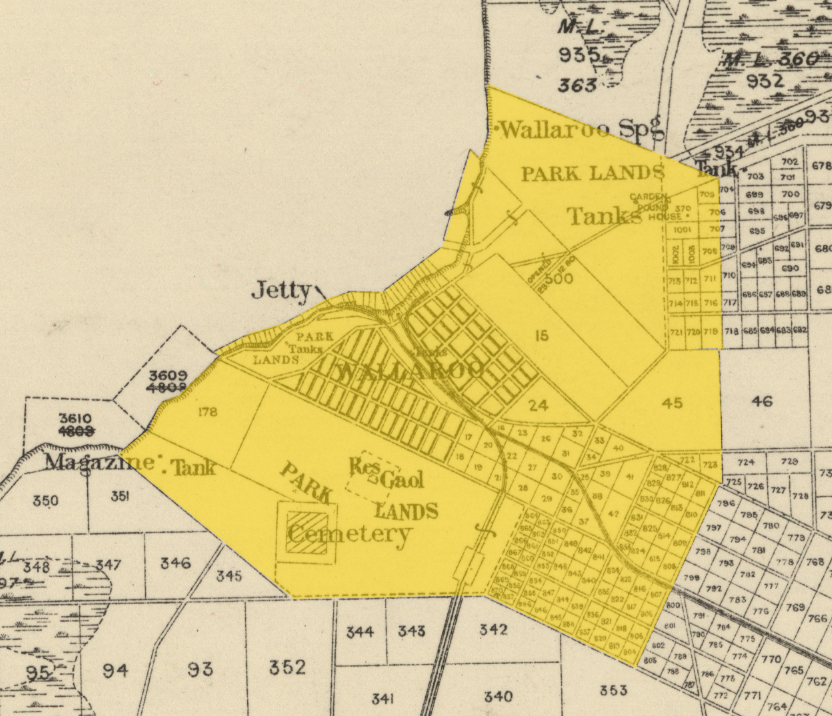
Boundaries of the Corporate Town of Wallaroo within the Hundred of Wallaroo at its establishment in 1874

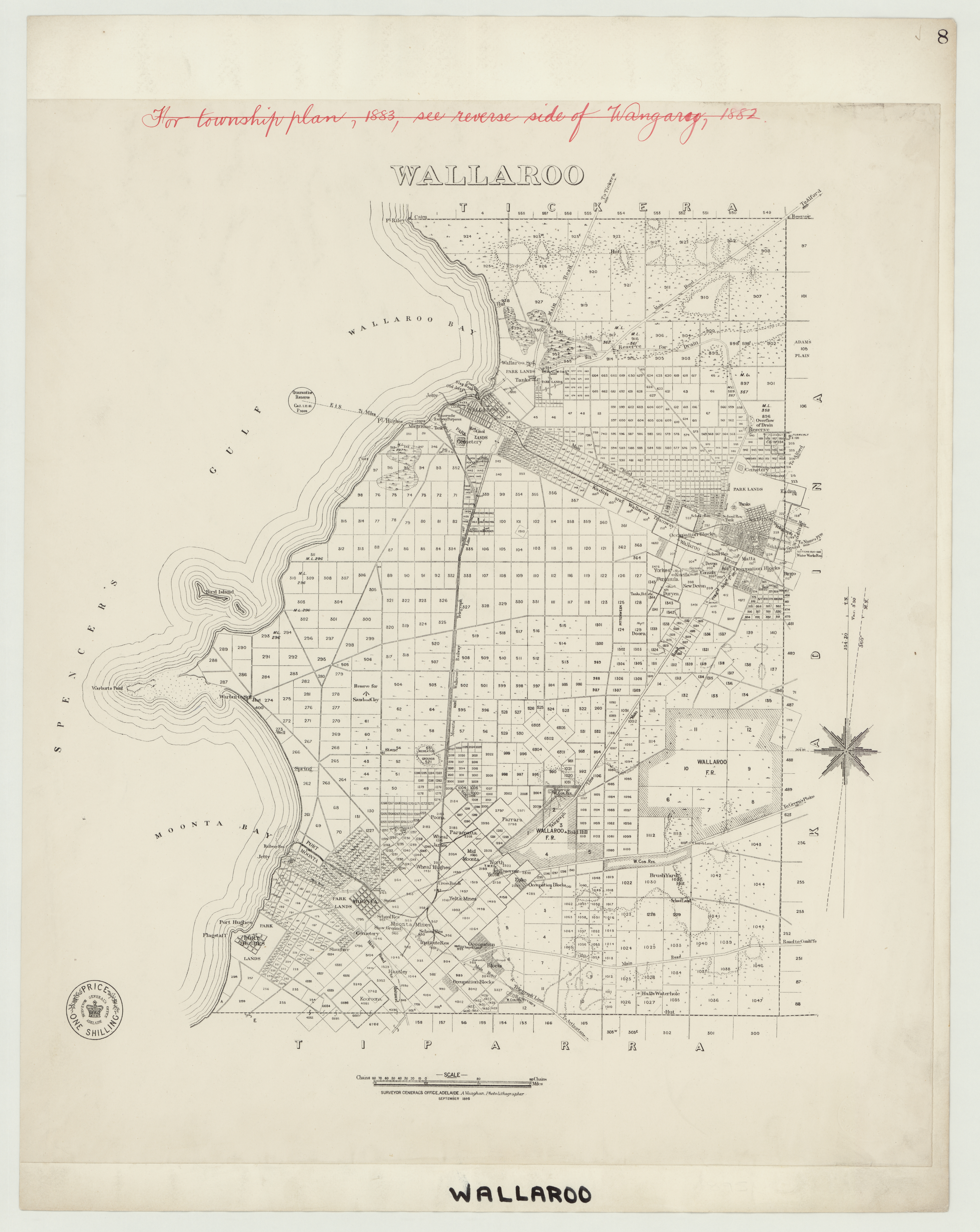
Map of the Hundred of Wallaroo, 1895, showing the township on the northern coast

The Corporate Town of Wallaroo was a local government area in South Australia from 1874 to 1997, centred on the town of Wallaroo.

== History ==
The municipality was proclaimed on 25 June 1874, following a petition from local residents that February, although there been had earlier opposition to incorporation. It consisted of five members at its creation, with two seats from each of a North Ward and South Ward and a separate position for the mayor.

The first town hall had originally been the Wallaroo Institute, but had subsequently been taken over by the council for use as a town hall. This became too small for community purposes, and a new town hall was built in 1902 at a cost of £3,050. The building was completely destroyed by fire on 26 December 1917, involving substantial loss of municipal records. It was immediately rebuilt, with the new hall reopening in February 1919.

Prior to the collapse of the Wallaroo and Kadina Mining Company in 1923, the Wallaroo council bought power from the company rather than producing it themselves, leaving them temporarily stranded when the company went into liquidation that year. In 1936, the municipality covered an area of approximately two and three quarter square miles, and had a population of 4,000. It was responsible for 29 miles of streets and roads and 800 acres of parklands, and had undergone an active tree planting program. It ceased to exist in 1997, when it merged with the District Council of Northern Yorke Peninsula to form the District Council of the Copper Coast.

== Mayors ==
- Thomas Davies (1874–1875)
- Eneder Warmington (1876)
- Thomas Davies (1877–1879)
- David Bews (1880–1882)
- William Phillips (1883–1884)
- Eneder Warmington (1885)
- William Philips (1886–1887)
- James Malcolm (1888)
- George Chatfield (1889–1890)
- Thomas Davies (1891)
- William Richardson (1892–1893)
- John Evans (1894–1895)
- James Malcolm (1896–1899)
- William Richardson (1900–1902)
- Edward Beare (1902–1904)
- John D. Phillips (1904–1906)
- James Brenton (1907–1911)
- John Frederick Herbert (1911–1913)
- William Price (1913–1914)
- Thomas E. Ashton (1915–1917)
- George Chatfield (1918–1921)
- William F. Errington (1922–1923)
- William Henry Harbison (1924–1925)
- Albert A. Chandler (1926–1927)
- William J. Williams (1928–1929)
- Douglas F. Warmington (1930–1931)
- William Henry Harbison (1932–1938)
- John Stanyer (1939–1940)
- Robert James Milne (1941–1942)
- Garnet Leopold James Boase (1943–1944)
- George Howes Seeley (1945)
- John Woods (1946–1948)
- Arthur Gladstone Clarke (1949–1956)
- John Magor Phillips (1957–1959)
- Ralph Emerson Allan (1960–1962)
- Francis Aloysius Jones (1963–1970)
- Rudolf Emil Otto Diedrich (1971–1974)
- Francis Aloysius Jones (1975–1976)
- David Kyffin Thomas (1977–1982)
- William John (Bill) Bollmeyer (1983–1989)
- Mick Rucioch (1989–1995)
- Heather Browne (1995–1997)
