= Moonta =

Moonta may refer to:

== Places ==
- Moonta, South Australia, a locality in the Copper Coast Council including:
  - East Moonta
  - Moonta Bay
  - Moonta Cemetery
  - Moonta Mines
  - North Moonta
- Corporate Town of Moonta, a former local government area
- New Moonta, a suburb in Bundaberg, Queensland

== Ships ==
- MV Moonta, a cruise ship now used as a casino
- SS Moonta (refer Moonta Herald and Northern Territory Gazette)
