= Hamley, South Australia =

Hamley
- Suburb
- Coordinates: 34.083790°S 137.600230°E
- Country: Australia
- State: South Australia
- LGA: Copper Coast Council
- Location: 131 km (81 mi) north-west of Adelaide city centre; 17 km (11 mi) south-west of Kadina
- Established: 1999

Government
  - State electorate: Narungga
  - Federal division: Grey

Population
  - Total: 31 (SAL 2021)
- Time zone: UTC+9:30 (ACST)
  - Summer (DST): UTC+10:30 (ACST)
- Postcode: 5558
- Mean max temp: 23.8 °C (74.8 °F)
- Mean min temp: 9.8 °C (49.6 °F)
- Annual rainfall: 330.1 mm (13.00 in)
Suburbs around Hamley
Moonta Mines	Moonta Mines	Moonta Mines
Kooroona	Hamley	Moonta Mines
Kooroona	Kooroona	Moonta Mines
- Distances; Coordinates; Climate; Adjoining localities

Hamley is a locality in the Australian state of South Australia located on the Yorke Peninsula, on the southern side of the urban area associated with Moonta. It is around 130 kilometres (81 miles) north-west of the Adelaide city centre.

== Description ==
Hamley is located within the federal division of Grey, the state electoral district of Narungga and the local government area of the Copper Coast Council. Its boundaries which were created in January 1999 for the “long established name.” Land use within Hamley is controlled by cultural heritage conservation requirements due to it being located within the historic site, known as the Moonta Mines State Heritage Area, where any use and associated built development must meet statutory planning objectives ensuring the promotion, conservation, enhancement and maintenance of the area’s “historic character and cultural significance".

== History ==
The Hamley Mine (originally the Karkarilla Mine) was one of the larger mines in the Moonta-Wallaroo area, producing an estimated 10,000 tonnes of copper throughout its lifetime. It primarily operated from 1862 to 1888, although it was subsequently reworked by tributors and sold to another company in 1914. Hamley was connected by horse tramway to East Moonta and Moonta Bay from 1869 to 1930. The sites of the Hamley mine and associated tramway are points on the Moonta Heritage Trail.
