= Kadina Airport =

Airport in Kadina, South Australia

Copper Triangle Aerodrome Kadina Airport
- IATA: none; ICAO: YKDI

Summary
- Airport type: Public
- Operator: Copper Coast Council
- Location: Kadina, South Australia
- Elevation AMSL: 138 ft / 42 m
- Coordinates: 33°58′12″S 137°39′36″E

Map
- Location in South Australia

Runways
Direction	Length		Surface
Direction	m	ft	Surface
05/23	1,200	3,937	Asphalt
- Sources: Australian AIP and aerodrome chart

Kadina Airport (also known as Copper Triangle Aerodrome or Copper Coast Airport) is a public airport located approximately 5 km (3.1 mi) west of Kadina, South Australia at the top of the Yorke Peninsula in the Copper Coast region. The airport is operated by the Copper Coast Council and provides facilities for aeromedical evacuation and emergency services aircraft, as well as general aviation and recreational users for the towns of Kadina, Wallaroo and Moonta which are all within close proximity. The airfield was opened on 18 April 1983.

== Airport facilities and operations ==
The airport has a single runway, 05/23, with a sealed surface measuring 1,200 m (3,900 ft) by 18 m (59 ft). The runway is equipped with pilot-activated lighting for operations at night, installed in 2003. However, as an unlicenced aircraft landing area, facilities and movement areas are not required to be maintained to the same standard as a certified airport and scheduled passenger flights are not permitted. Pilots operate into the airport at their own risk and must co-ordinate arrivals and departures and separate themselves from other aircraft using a Common Traffic Advisory Frequency. Basic facilities are provided for visiting aircraft and passengers, including an all-weather tie-down and parking area as well as toilet facilities. Avgas is also available 24 hours a day.

In June 2020, the airport was awarded a federal grant of $104,000 was received to reseal the taxiway connecting the runway to the emergency services and general aviation parking areas and to mitigate the risk of flooding affecting the operation of the airport.

As well as aviation uses, the runway is occasionally a venue for drag racing and motorsports events, such as the Copper Coast 500 sprint charity meet.

== See also ==
- List of airports in South Australia
