= Warburto, South Australia =

Warburto South Australia
- Coordinates: 34.021310°S 137.602350°E
- Population: 58 (SAL 2021)
- Established: 1999
- Postcode(s): 5556
- Time zone: ACST (UTC+9:30)
  - Summer (DST): ACST (UTC+10:30)
- Location: 140 km (87 mi) north-west of Adelaide city centre
- LGA(s): Copper Coast Council
- State electorate(s): Narungga
- Federal division(s): Grey
Mean max temp	Mean min temp	Annual rainfall
23.8 °C; 75 °F	9.8 °C; 50 °F	330.1 mm 13 in
Suburbs around Warburto:
Spencer Gulf	Wallaroo	Kadina
Spencer Gulf	Warburto	Kadina
Spencer Gulf	Moonta Bay; North Moonta; Paramatta	Boors Plain
- Footnotes: Distances; Coordinates; Climate; Adjoining localities

Warburto is a locality in South Australia located on the west coast of Yorke Peninsula, consisting of the rural areas south of the town of Wallaroo around the headland of Warburto Point. It immediately adjoins Spencer Gulf, and is located about 140 kilometres (87 miles) north-west of the Adelaide city centre.

== Description ==
Warburto is located within the federal division of Grey, the state electoral district of Narungga and the local government area of the Copper Coast Council. The boundaries of the gazetted locality were created in January 1999. As of 2014, land use within the locality consisted of agriculture being the major use, followed by conservation including the Bird Islands Conservation Park. In August 2014, sections were severed and added to the localities of Cross Roads, North Moonta and Paramatta to "better align postal delivery and to reflect historical associations". There was once a Warburto railway station on the former Wallaroo railway line.
