= Will Hope (cartoonist) =

Australian political cartoonist

William Francis Celestine Hope (March 1887 in Paramatta – ?) was an Australian-born political cartoonist. His work was published in the Cumberland Argus in Australia and in Truth in New Zealand in 1912. By 1915, he had moved to the United States, where he was published in the New York Globe and The Masses. He then worked in London, drawing for a number of Fleet Street newspapers and the Communist (from 1920 to 1923). He often worked under the pseudonym 'Espoir'.
