= Kooroona, South Australia =

Kooroona South Australia
- Coordinates: 34.094160°S 137.592550°E
- Population: 17 (SAL 2021)
- Postcode(s): 5558
- LGA(s): Copper Coast Council
- State electorate(s): Narungga
- Federal division(s): Grey
Localities around Kooroona:
Moonta	Moonta	Moonta Mines
Port Hughes	Kooroona	Moonta Mines; Hamley
Nalyappa	Nalyappa	Agery
- Footnotes: Coordinates

Kooroona is a rural locality at the north end of the Yorke Peninsula of South Australia, situated directly south of the town of Moonta. It is located in the Copper Coast Council.

== Description ==
The name and boundaries of Kooroona were formalised in January 1999, in respect of the long established local name. The area was alternatively known as Copper Valley, and had previously been known as South Bower, after a mining venture in the area. The historic Moonta Cemetery is located at the northern tip of Kooroona and is listed on the South Australian Heritage Register. The remainder of the locality is largely agricultural land.

== History ==
The South Bower Mining Company initially operated a mine at what is now Koonoona, and reconstituted itself in 1870 as the Copper Valley Mining Company. The mine itself was renamed South Hamley around 1874.
