= Boors Plain, South Australia =

Boors Plain South Australia
- Coordinates: 34.030440°S 137.6983°E
- Population: 56 (SAL 2021)
- Postcode(s): 5554
- LGA(s): Copper Coast Council
- State electorate(s): Narungga
- Federal division(s): Grey
Localities around Boors Plain:
Warburto	Kadina	Thrington
Paramatta; North Yelta; East Moonta	Boors Plain	Cunliffe
Agery	Agery	Agery
- Footnotes: Coordinates

Boors Plain (historically Boors Plains) is a rural locality at the north end of the Yorke Peninsula of South Australia, situated east of Moonta and south of Kadina. It is located in the Copper Coast Council.

== Description ==
The name and boundaries of the modern locality were formalised in January 1999. It is named after James Boor, a shepherd working for Sir Walter Hughes; Boor made the copper discovery that became Wallaroo Mines. Land within the locality is zoned for “agricultural production and the grazing of stock on relatively large holdings".

== History ==
A small village previously existed on the Kadina-Cunliffe Road. A limestone quarry nearby supplied building materials for the Moonta and Wallaroo Mines. Boors Plains Post Office opened in July 1882 and closed in September 1899. Boors Plains School operated from 1879 to 1941. The Boors Plains Methodist Church (1873-1967) consisted of three rooms – the church, the Boor's Plains School room + a third room used for Sunday School or celebration of community's event). Today, the former church site is marked by a memorial cairn. The Boors Plains Oval was located on Moonta-Thrington Road at a site known as Stanways Corner. The Boors Plains Cricket Club (1880-1965) and the Boors Plains Tennis Club (closed during World War II) were both based there. Boors Plain had its own branch of the Agricultural Bureau: it was reported as being highly successful in the 1930s, and in 1979 published a short history celebrating "the first 50 years". The Bald Hill 1864 Miners' Strike Site, located in the west of Boors Plain, is listed on the South Australian Heritage Register.
