= Moonta Cemetery =

Cemetery in Moonta, South Australia

- Interactive map of Moonta Cemetery

Details
- Established: 1867
- Location: 5 Tank Road, Moonta, South Australia
- Country: Australia
- Coordinates: 34.075034°S 137.585581°E
- Owned by: District Council of the Copper Coast
- Find a Grave: Moonta Cemetery
- Footnotes: Moonta Cemetery – CWGC

The Moonta Cemetery in Moonta, South Australia was established under the Moonta Cemetery Trust in May 1866. Burials had occurred prior to that, with the town having been surveyed and land sold in March 1863. Plans for the cemetery were made in 1867 with walls erected between 1871 and 1876, the front gates made by J. H. Horwood and Co. of Adelaide. J. H. Horwood and Co. also cast the copper bell installed in 1896.

The Moonta Cemetery, including wall, gates and waiting room were included in the South Australian Heritage Register on 28 November 1985. It is now managed by the District Council of the Copper Coast.

== People ==
Interments in the cemetery include:

- Thomas Boutflower Bennett (1808–1894) was an early colonist of South Australia
- John Verran, (1856–1932) miner and premier
- John Stanley Verran, (1883–1952) politician
