= Wheal Hughes =

Location of Wheal Hughes in South Australia

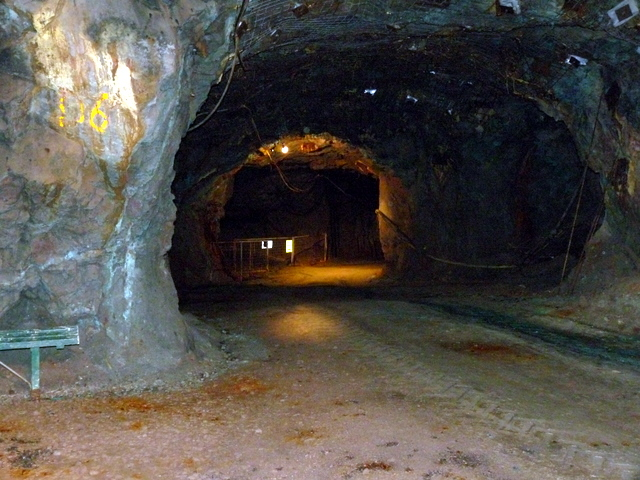

Wheal Hughes was a copper mine in the 19th century, but is now a tourist attraction at Cross Roads, near Moonta, Yorke Peninsula, South Australia.

The mine is named after Walter Watson Hughes a Scottish sea captain who had emigrated to South Australia in 1840 and purchased land in the vicinity of Moonta for keeping sheep. Minerals were discovered on his property two shepherds working for Hughes: firstly, in 1860 by James Boor, and then again in 1861 at what is now Moonta, by Patrick Ryan. The 'wheal' part of the name comes from Cornish, and means 'place of work' - Cornish miners were a big part of the early workforce.

One of the first mines to be discovered in the area, it remained workable as an underground mine until 1868, producing large quantities of copper and significant amounts of gold. Further deposits were extracted for a short time in 1890. .

It was subsequently worked using open-cut techniques between 1990 and 1993, and eventually reopened in 1998 as tourist attraction.

It was run by the Moonta Branch of the National Trust of South Australia in conjunction with other venues: Tourist Train, Miners Cottage, Museum, Old Fashioned Sweet Shop and Local & Family History Centre. Visitors could go underground to see the tunnels and large stopes.

Tourists are no longer able to go underground.
