= Yelta, South Australia =

Yelta South Australia
- Coordinates: 34.063710°S 137.6192°E
- Population: 21 (SAL 2021)
- Postcode(s): 5558
- LGA(s): Copper Coast Council
- State electorate(s): Goyder
- Federal division(s): Grey
Localities around Yelta:
Cross Roads	Paramatta	Paramatta
Moonta	Yelta	North Yelta
Moonta Mines	Moonta Mines; East Moonta	East Moonta
- Footnotes: Coordinates

Yelta is a rural locality at the northern end of the Yorke Peninsula and a satellite village to the town of Moonta, centred on the former Yelta Mine. It is located in the Copper Coast Council. The modern locality was established when the name and boundaries were selected in January 1999.

== Description ==
Land use within Yelta is divided between cultural heritage conservation and primary production. The western half of the locality is part of a historic site known as the Moonta Mines State Heritage Area where any use and associated built development must meet statutory planning objectives ensuring the promotion, conservation, enhancement and maintenance of the area's "historic character and cultural significance". The eastern half of the locality is zoned for “agricultural production and the grazing of stock on relatively large holdings". The Yelta Smelter Ruins are listed on the South Australian Heritage Register. The broader smelter and mine site had previously been listed on the Register of the National Estate.

== History ==
The Yelta mine, located on the current boundary with North Yelta, was worked in three distinct periods: from 1864 to the mid-1870s, from 1903 to 1907 by Paramatta Copper Mines Ltd., and as a state enterprise from 1910 to 1913. The Yelta Mining Company was founded in 1864 following small-scale operations by Henry Richard Hancock, leading to the discovery of the main lode in 1868, and by the time of its first closure following a downturn in copper prices in 1877, it had produced 1,700 tonnes of copper. The French-owned Paramatta company was optimistic about the mine's prospects when it reopened it in 1903, although it had been dormant for thirty years, and upgraded the mine and smelting plant and connected the Yelta and Paramatta mines to the Balaklava-Moonta railway line. However, the mine closed again in 1907, which the Register of the National Estate suggested may have stemmed from a downturn in copper prices that year. There continued to be high local hopes for the mine when it was controversially purchased by the Verran state Labor government in 1910; however, it was again unsuccessful, and closed permanently in 1913, with the machinery being sold off in 1915 and 1920. The total production of the mine over its lifetime is estimated at 4,300 tonnes of copper.

The state government also conducted a secondary mining operation in the east of the Yelta leases from 1906 to 1916. It was later reworked by private parties as the Black Dog Mine from 1924 to 1929 and again as part of the Moonta Mining Scheme from 1929 to 1938. It produced a further 1,920 tonnes of copper.
