= North Yelta, South Australia =

North Yelta South Australia
- Coordinates: 34.061630°S 137.632130°E
- Population: 0 (SAL 2021)
- Postcode(s): 5558
- LGA(s): Copper Coast Council
- State electorate(s): Narungga
- Federal division(s): Grey
Localities around North Yelta:
| Paramatta | Paramatta; Boors Plain | Boors Plain |
| Yelta | North Yelta | Boors Plain |
| East Moonta | East Moonta | Boors Plain |
- Footnotes: Coordinates

North Yelta is a rural locality in the Australian state of South Australia at the northern end of the Yorke Peninsula.

== Description ==
North Yelta lies on the far eastern outskirts of the town of Moonta. It falls under the local governance of the Copper Coast Council. The modern locality was established when the name and boundaries were selected for the long established local name in January 1999. Land within the locality is zoned for “agricultural production and the grazing of stock on relatively large holdings". Development controls are in place for residential buildings adjoining Mines Road which forms the northern boundary of the locality and which connects Moonta in the south to Kadina in the north in order to preserve the character of the building stock along the road which dates back to the late 19th and early 20th centuries.

== History ==
The former Yelta Mine lies on the modern boundary between Yelta and North Yelta. It was also the base for the separate North Yelta mine, operated by the North Yelta Mining Company, which worked lodes that continued over from the more prominent Yelta and Moonta leases. North Yelta Post Office opened in June 1877 and closed in May 1972.
