= Port Hughes, South Australia =

Coastal town in South Australia

Port Hughes South Australia
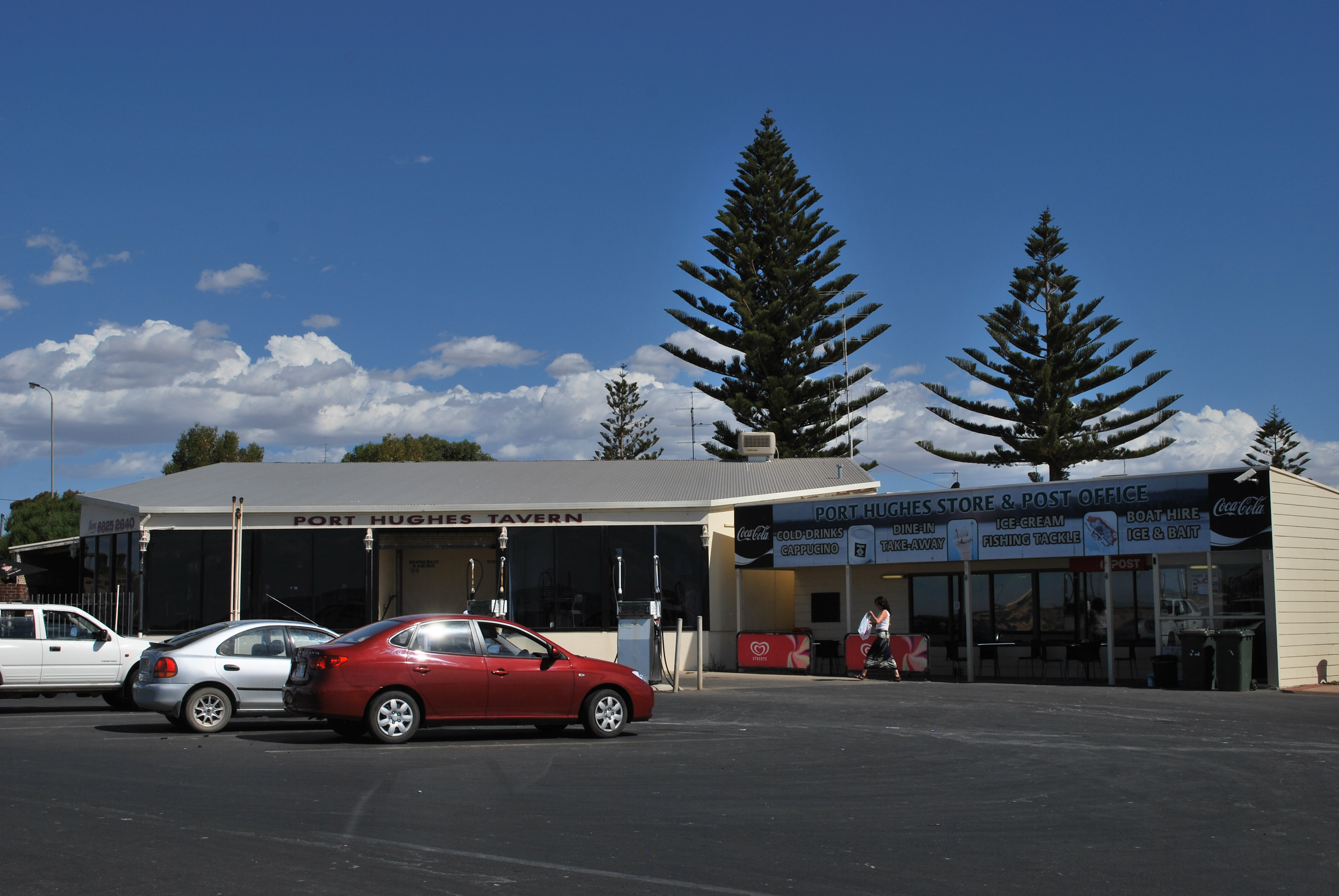
- Port Hughes General Store and Tavern

- Coordinates: 34°04′39″S 137°33′03″E
- Population: 647 (SAL 2021)
- Established: 1863 (town); 1999 (locality)
- Postcode(s): 5558
- Time zone: ACST (UTC+9:30)
  - Summer (DST): ACST (UTC+10:30)
- Location: 135 km (84 mi) NW of Adelaide; 3 km (2 mi) W of Moonta
- LGA(s): Copper Coast Council
- Region: Yorke and Mid North
- County: Daly
- State electorate(s): Narungga
- Federal division(s): Grey
Mean max temp	Mean min temp	Annual rainfall
23.8 °C; 75 °F	9.8 °C; 50 °F	330.1 mm 13 in
Localities around Port Hughes:
Spencer Gulf	Moonta Bay	Moonta
Spencer Gulf	Port Hughes	Kooroona
Spencer Gulf	Nalyappa	Kooroona
- Footnotes: Adjoining localities

Port Hughes is a town and locality in the Australian state of South Australia located on northern Yorke Peninsula about 135 kilometres (84 mi) north-west of the state capital of Adelaide. It is considered part of the Moonta urban area by the Australian Bureau of Statistics. At the 2016 census, Port Hughes had a population of 571.

== Description ==
Port Hughes is a popular tourist destination, with attractions including a Greg Norman-designed links style golf course, the beach and the historic timber jetty. The beach is regarded as safe for swimming, which attracts families going on vacation. People fish in Port Hughes from the jetty or from boats in Spencer Gulf which can be easily launched at the local boat ramp. Boats are also available for charter to go fishing. Tourists and visitors can find accommodation at the caravan park, which features onsite cabins and villas. Port Hughes also has a general store and tavern.

== Jetty ==
The current Port Hughes jetty was built in 1914 and is a popular fishing spot. An earlier jetty fell into disrepair and was condemned by 1908. The site was considered favourable for a jetty as it was able to reach into deeper water than the nearby jetty at Moonta. In the 21st century, the jetty is regarded as one of the best scuba diving sites in South Australia, notable for its extensive soft coral growth (Carijoa sp.). The jetty reaches out into water 6–7 metres deep and is approximately 250 metres long. Due to its relatively shallow waters (by contemporary standards) and predictable conditions, the jetty can also be enjoyed by beginners divers, underwater photographers, snorkelers and free-divers.

The jetty endured storm damage in August 2020 and was closed until repairs were completed in December that year.

== History ==
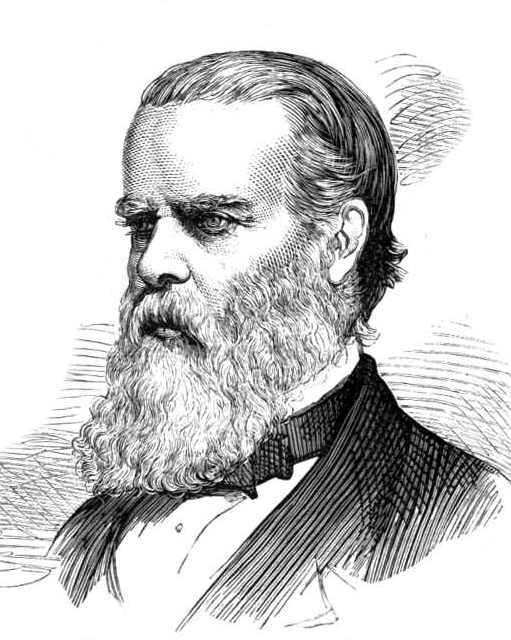
Etching of Sir Walter Watson Hughes

The government town of Port Hughes was surveyed in April 1863 and named after Sir Watson Hughes. The boundary of the town was extended in April 1960 and again in October 1985. Boundaries were created for the locality now known as Port Hughes in January 1999 which include the full extent of the former government town. The locality was enlarged in July 2008 by the addition of land from the adjoining locality of Moonta Bay.

In recent years, Port Hughes has been the subject of significant interest from land developers, with several land subdivisions in the local area. The most significant recent developments are the Patrick's Cove and Patrick's View land subdivisions, which have resulted in new housing being constructed and an influx of new residents. In June 2007, "The Dunes Port Hughes", a major new residential development was announced, including the construction of the first Greg Norman designed golf course in Australia, as well as a hotel and convention facility, as part of a major housing development. On 11 July 2012 Ferrier Hodgson partners David Kidman and Martin Lewis were appointed as receivers and managers to sell the remaining allotments and development properties.

== Governance ==
Port Hughes is located within the federal Division of Grey, the state electoral district of Narungga and the local government area known as the Copper Coast Council.

== Gallery ==
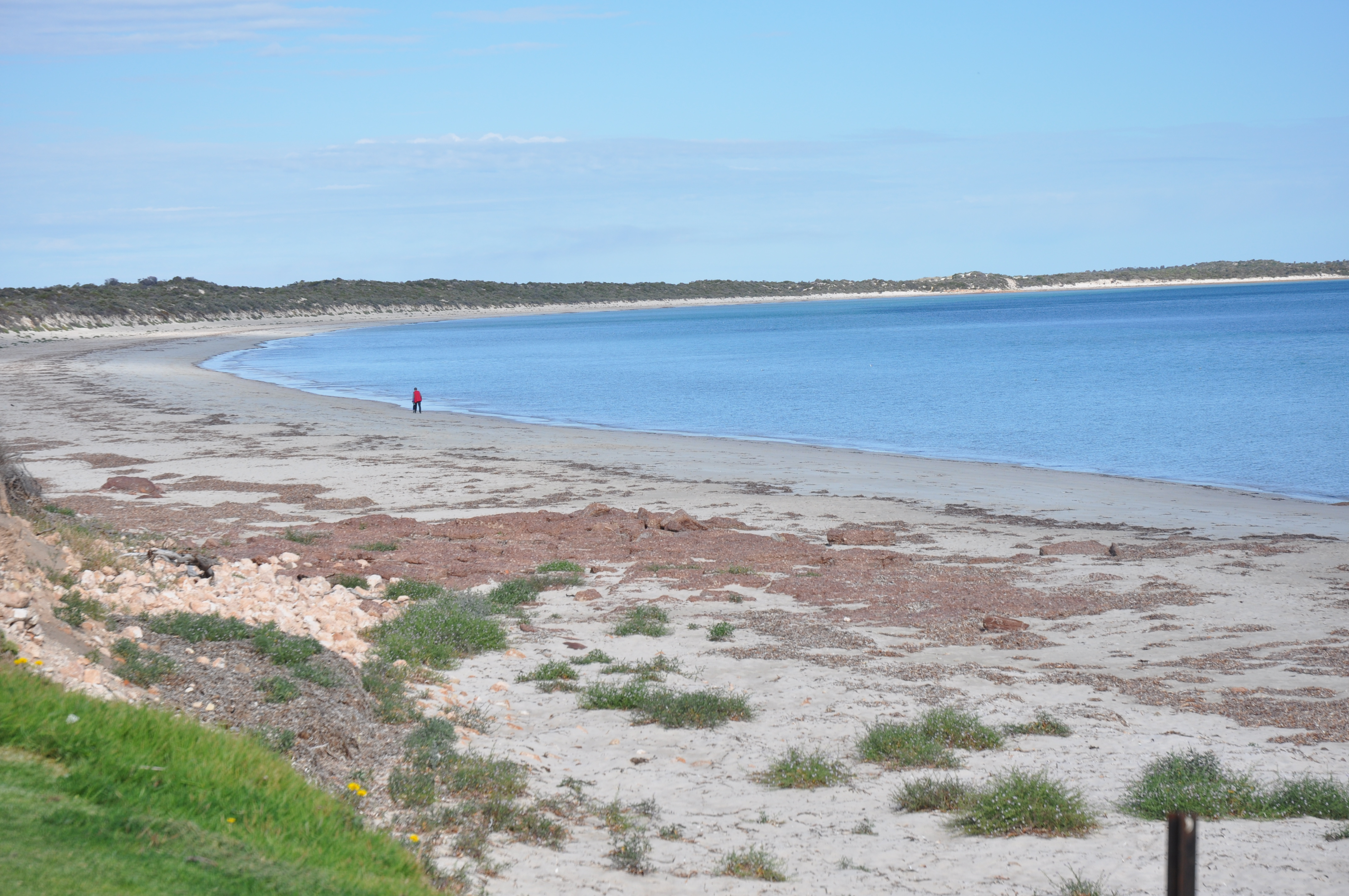
South Beach Port Hughes

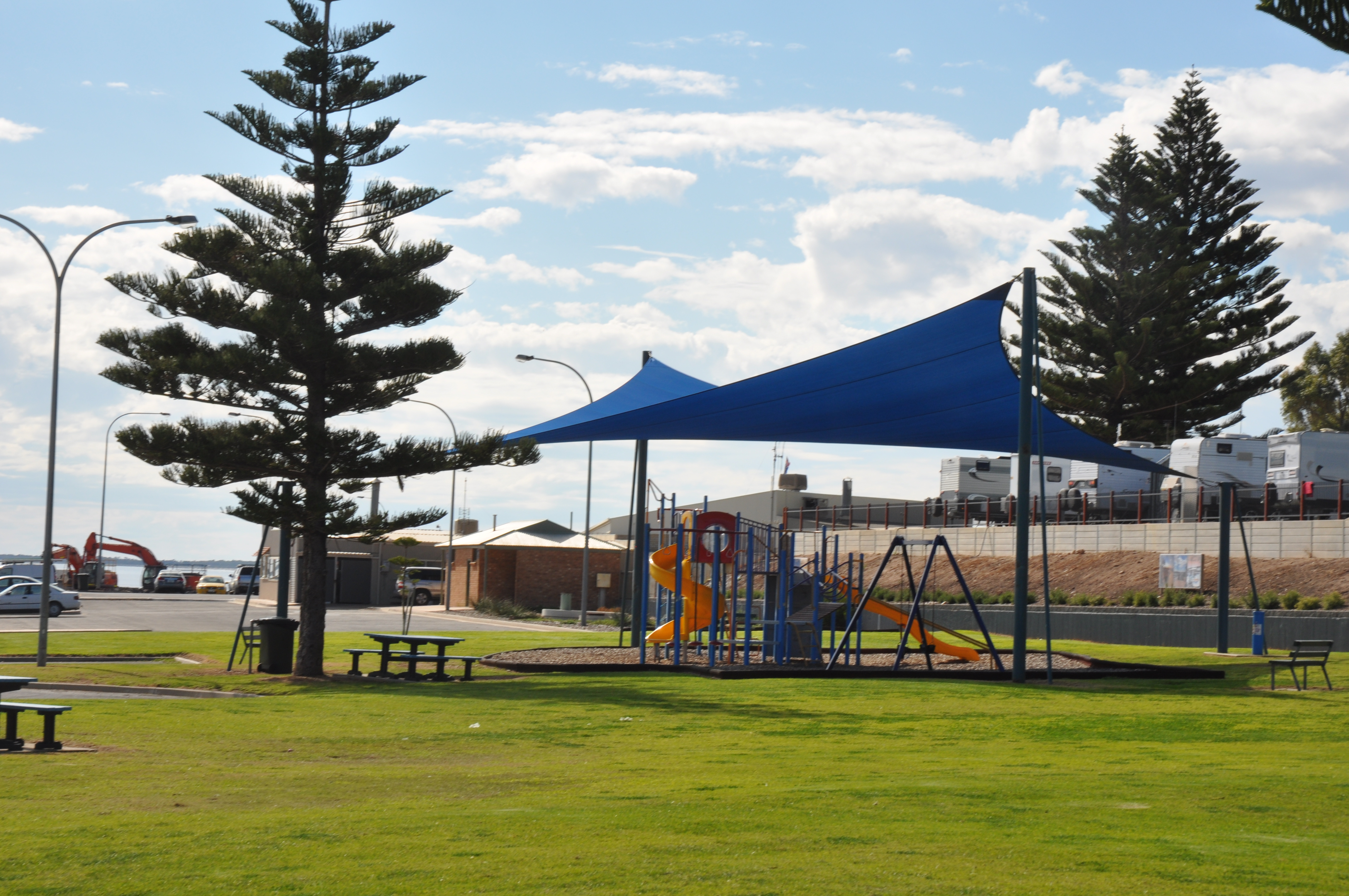
Port Hughes Foreshore

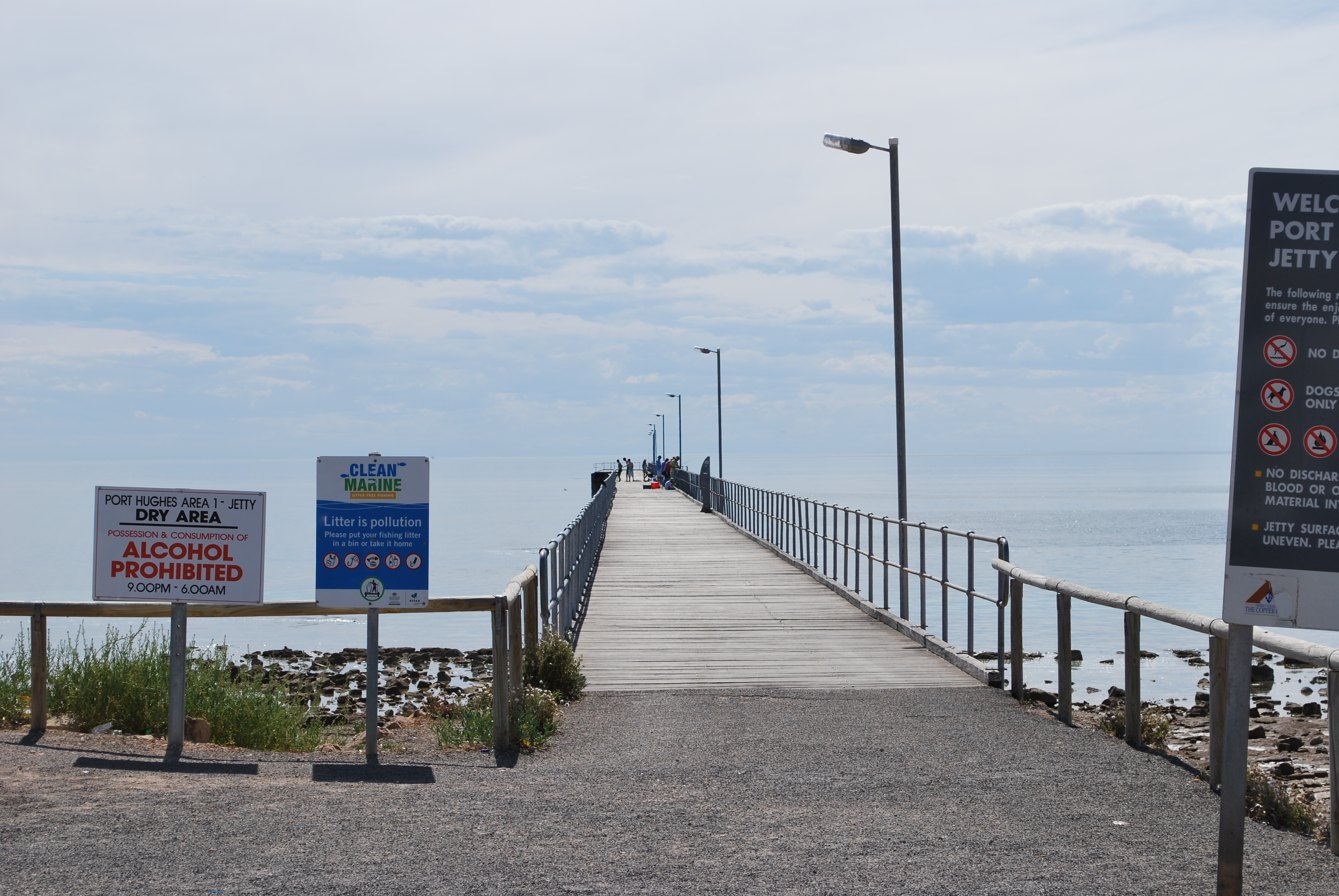
Port Hughes Jetty
