= Paramatta, South Australia =

Paramatta
- Suburb
- Coordinates: 34.05°S 137.625°E
- Country: Australia
- State: South Australia
- LGA: Copper Coast Council
- Location: 132 km (82 mi) north-west of Adelaide city centre; 14 km (8.7 mi) south of Wallaroo
- Established: 1999

Government
  - State electorate: Narungga
  - Federal division: Grey

Population
  - Total: 9 (SAL 2021)
- Time zone: UTC+9:30 (ACST)
  - Summer (DST): UTC+10:30 (ACST)
- Postcode: 5558
- Mean max temp: 23.8 °C (74.8 °F)
- Mean min temp: 9.8 °C (49.6 °F)
- Annual rainfall: 330.1 mm (13.00 in)
Suburbs around Paramatta
Warburto	Warburto	Boors Plain
North Moonta	Paramatta	Boors Plain
Cross Roads	Cross Roads; Yelta; North Yelta	Boors Plain; North Yelta
- Locations; Coordinates; Climate; Adjoining localities

Paramatta is a locality in the Australian state of South Australia located on the Yorke Peninsula on the north-east side of the urban area associated with Moonta about 132 kilometres (82 miles) north-west of the Adelaide city centre. It was named using the same Aboriginal phrase for the suburb of Sydney spelled Parramatta.

== Description ==
Paramatta is located within the federal division of Grey, the state electoral district of Narungga and the local government area of the Copper Coast Council. Its boundaries were created in January 1999 for “the long established local name.” The name was derived from the Paramatta Mine. In 2014, land was added to the locality from Warburto to “better align postal delivery and to reflect historical associations.” As of 2014, land within the locality was zoned for agriculture.
