= East Moonta, South Australia =

East Moonta South Australia
- Coordinates: 34.083380°S 137.625580°E
- Population: 130 (SAL 2021)
- Postcode(s): 5558
- LGA(s): Copper Coast Council
- State electorate(s): Narungga
- Federal division(s): Grey
Localities around East Moonta:
Yelta	North Yelta	Boors Plain
Moonta Mines	East Moonta	Boors Plain
Agery	Agery	Agery
- Footnotes: Coordinates

East Moonta is a rural locality at the northern end of the Yorke Peninsula and a satellite village to the town of Moonta. It is located in the Copper Coast Council.

== Description ==
The modern locality was established when the name and boundaries were selected in January 1999. Land use within East Moonta is divided between cultural heritage conservation, primary production and residential use. Part of a historic site known as the Moonta Mines State Heritage Area occupies land on the western side of the locality which is zoned to ensure that any land use and associated built development meets statutory planning objectives for the promotion, conservation, enhancement and maintenance of the state heritage area's "historic character and cultural significance". Land on the north-east side of the locality is zoned for “agricultural production and the grazing of stock on relatively large holdings". Land on the south-west side of the locality to the south side of Arthurton Road is largely zoned for residential use "consisting of detached dwellings on large allotments". The Moonta Gun Club is located on Arthurton Road in East Moonta.

== History ==
East Moonta was connected to Moonta and Moonta Bay by a horse-drawn tramway from 1869 to 1930. The disused East Moonta Methodist Church in Deeble Street dates from 1872, and was listed on the Register of the National Estate, and was the first church in South Australia to provide amphitheatre seating. It formerly had its own school; however, this has long since closed. It also once had its own football and cricket teams.
