= Kernewek Lowender =

Cornish festival in South Australia

Coordinates: 34°07′11″S 137°29′28″E

The Kernewek Lowender (officially the Kernewek Lowender Copper Coast Cornish Festival) is a Cornish-themed biennial festival held in the Copper Coast towns of Kadina, Moonta and Wallaroo on Yorke Peninsula, South Australia. 'Kernewek Lowender' means 'Cornish happiness' in the Cornish language. It is held in the late autumn starting on the second Monday of May, in odd-numbered years. The Kernewek Lowender claims to be the world’s largest Cornish Festival outside Cornwall.

== Activities ==
The festival is held over seven days with the highlight being 'The Big Weekend', featuring three large fairs: the Village Green Fair, Fer Kernewek, and a Classic Cavalcade of Cars (with over 500 vintage cars and motorcycles). Traditional Cornish food, such as Cornish pasties and Swanky beer is served during the Festival. maypole performances, furry dancing, and the selection of a May Queen are also included. Other events include a street parade, a bake-off, the Gathering of the Bards and the Dressing of the Graves. The event has grown in popularity, and the 2013 (40th anniversary) festival attracted an estimated 37,000 people from intrastate, interstate and overseas, and included a record 43 events and 15 associated activities. As of 2017, the region now hosts more than 45,000 visitors during the festival. A number of participants also dress up in traditional costumes as Cornish Jacks and Cornish Jennies.

Copper Coast Classic Cavalcade

Kernewek Lowender Maypole Dance

1975 Kernewek Lowender Festival

1975 Kernewek Lowender Festival

1975 Kernewek Lowender Festival

== History ==
The festival was instigated by local businessmen such as Keith Russack, and Premier Don Dunstan in the early 1970s as an initiative to boost the then economically depressed Copper Coast. The original Cornish Festival committee formed Kernewek Lowender Incorporated in 1972, and chose the May long weekend for the festival. The first festival went ahead in 1973 with the assistance of a A$1000 grant from the South Australian government and exceeded the organisers' expectations. The region hosted 20,000 visitors during the festival, with 11,000 attending the Fer Kernewek (Cornish Fair) in Moonta, 15,000 visiting the Moonta Mines Museum, and 8,000 Cornish pasties consumed. Dunstan himself later recalled: "When I proposed the establishment of a Cornish Festival, in Australia's "Little Cornwall", people of Cornish descent came flocking."

Traditionally the festival culminated in a 3-day long weekend with events in each town for one day of the long weekend. However, when the Adelaide Cup Day public holiday was moved, difficulties were experienced in scheduling events with only two days for the three towns, and concerns were raised over whether Wallaroo received enough focus. Early in 2011, the ability to market Cornish pasties by that name at the festival was cast into doubt, following a trademark ruling by the European Commission. The Cornish pasty was awarded Protected Geographical Indication (PGI) status and it was unclear whether the European ruling would force Australian retailers to rename their pasty products to comply.

== Festival dates ==
- 2011: 9–15 May
- 2013: 21–26 May
- 2015: 17–24 May
- 2017: 19–21 May
- 2019: 13–19 May
- 2021: 17–23 May
- 2023: 15–21 May
- 2025: 12-18 May
- 2027: 10-16 May

== See also ==
- Kernewek Lowender Website
- List of festivals in Australia
- Copper Coast
- Cornish Australian
- Cornish diaspora
- Culture of Cornwall
