= Cross Roads, South Australia =

Cross Roads South Australia
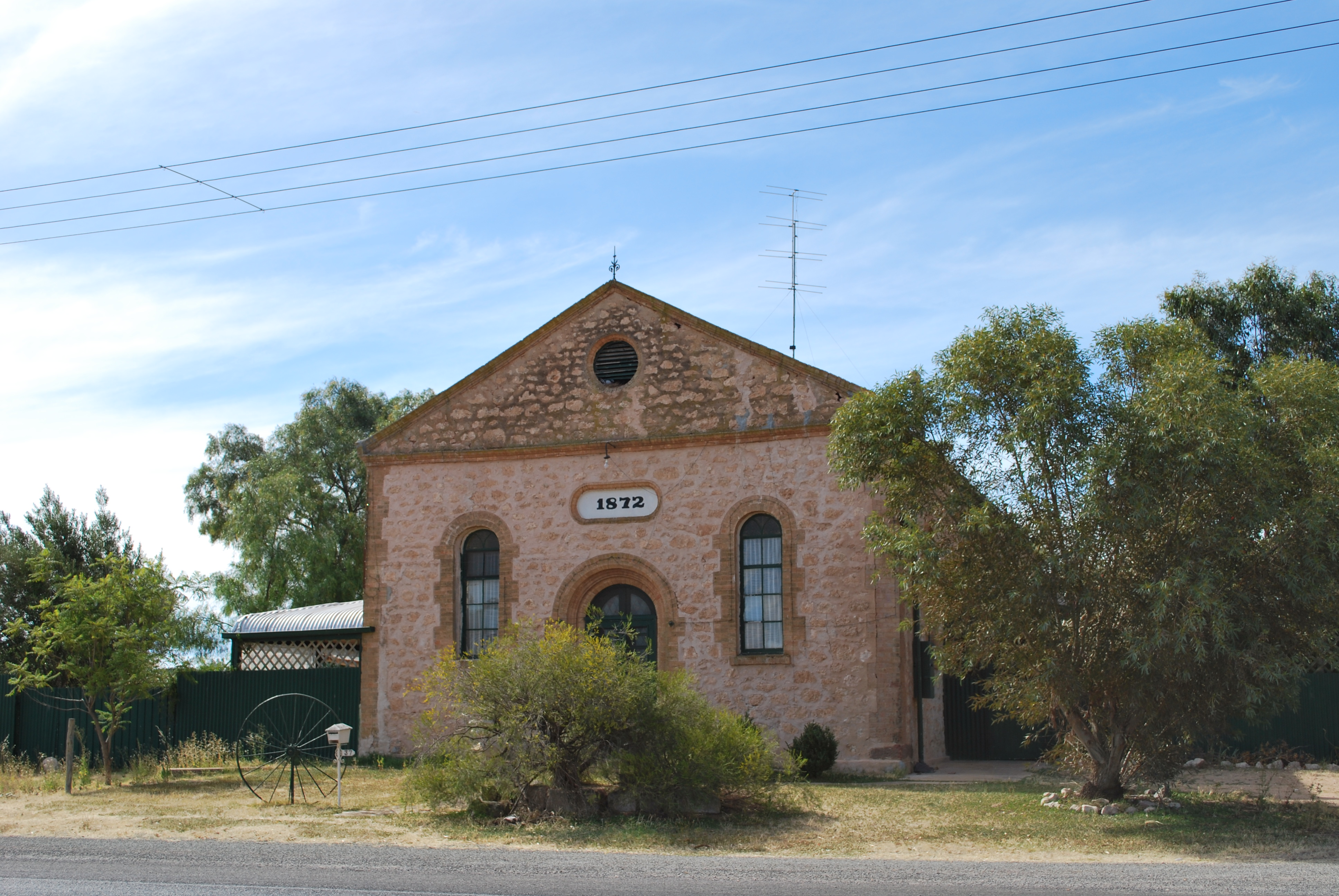
- Former Cross Roads Primitive Methodist Church

- Coordinates: 34.062090°S 137.610480°E
- Population: 155 (SAL 2021)
- Postcode(s): 5558
- LGA(s): Copper Coast Council
- State electorate(s): Narungga
- Federal division(s): Grey
Localities around Cross Roads:
North Moonta	North Moonta; Paramatta	Paramatta
North Moonta	Cross Roads	Paramatta
Moonta	Moonta	Yelta
- Footnotes: Coordinates

Cross Roads is a locality at the northern end of the Yorke Peninsula and a satellite village to the town of Moonta on its east. It is located in the Copper Coast Council.

== Description ==
The modern locality was established when the name and boundaries were selected in January 1999. Land use within Cross Roads is divided between cultural heritage conservation and primary production. The southern half of the locality is part of a historic site known as the Moonta Mines State Heritage Area where any use and associated built development must meet statutory planning objectives ensuring the promotion, conservation, enhancement and maintenance of the state heritage area's 'historic character and cultural significance'. The eastern half of the locality is zoned for "agricultural production and the grazing of stock on relatively large holdings."

== History ==
The village originally grew around the intersection of the Wallaroo and Kadina roads. The Wheal Hughes copper mine lies north of the Cross Roads township on the Wallaroo-Moonta Road. The mine was a significant underground operation in the 1860s, was briefly worked as an open cut mine in the 1990s, and later operated as a tourist attraction. Cross Roads railway station was situated on the Balaklava-Moonta railway line, and the Wallaroo-Moonta section of the line closed on 23 July 1984. Cross Roads School operated from 1871 to 1878. It had 97 pupils in 1872. An 1870s cottage at Cross Roads built by local miner Richard Whitford, father of politician Stanley Whitford, was listed on the Register of the National Estate.

Cross Roads originally had three Methodist churches: a Primitive Methodist (1872), a Bible Christian (1873) and a Wesleyan (1875). The congregations combined in 1900, with the Bible Christian building continuing as the church; however, following a tornado in 1973 which destroyed the Bible Christian church and damaged the Primitive Methodist church, the congregation relocated to the former Wesleyan church. The Wesleyan church now continues as the Cross Roads Uniting Church, while the Primitive Methodist church has been sold. The Wesleyan church had also previously been used as the Cross Roads branch of the Moonta Mines Institute for a period from 1902.
