= North Moonta, South Australia =

North Moonta South Australia
- Coordinates: 34.055820°S 137.591660°E
- Population: 605 (SAL 2021)
- Postcode(s): 5558
- LGA(s): Copper Coast Council
- State electorate(s): Narungga
- Federal division(s): Grey
Localities around North Moonta:
| Warburto | Warburto | Warburto |
| Moonta Bay | North Moonta | Paramatta |
| Moonta Bay | Moonta | Cross Roads |
- Footnotes: Coordinates

North Moonta is a locality in the Australian state of South Australia located at the northern end of the Yorke Peninsula on the north side of the town of Moonta.

== Description ==
North Moonta is located within the federal division of Grey, the state electoral district of Narungga and the local government area of the Copper Coast Council. It was originally a private subdivision, and the boundaries of the modern locality were established in January 1999. It includes the former Moonta Hospital in Majors Road, which closed in December 2013. The former hospital operators, Moonta Health & Aged Care Services, continue to operate the adjacent Parkview Aged Hostel. The Moonta Lifestyle Village in Barbary Court and the Copper Coast Lifestyle Village in James Place are also located at North Moonta. The south end of the locality includes a residential-zoned area to the west of the main Moonta-Wallaroo Road, bounded by Haylock Road, and an industrial-zoned area to the east of the main road. It also includes a "rural living" area to the west of the residential area, bounded by Haylock Road, Muddy Lane and Binney Road. The remaining two-thirds of the locality is zoned for primary production. On 14 August 2014, it received additional territory from Warburto and Cross Roads as part of a boundary realignment of the local area.
