= Wallaroo, South Australia =

Wallaroo
- Town
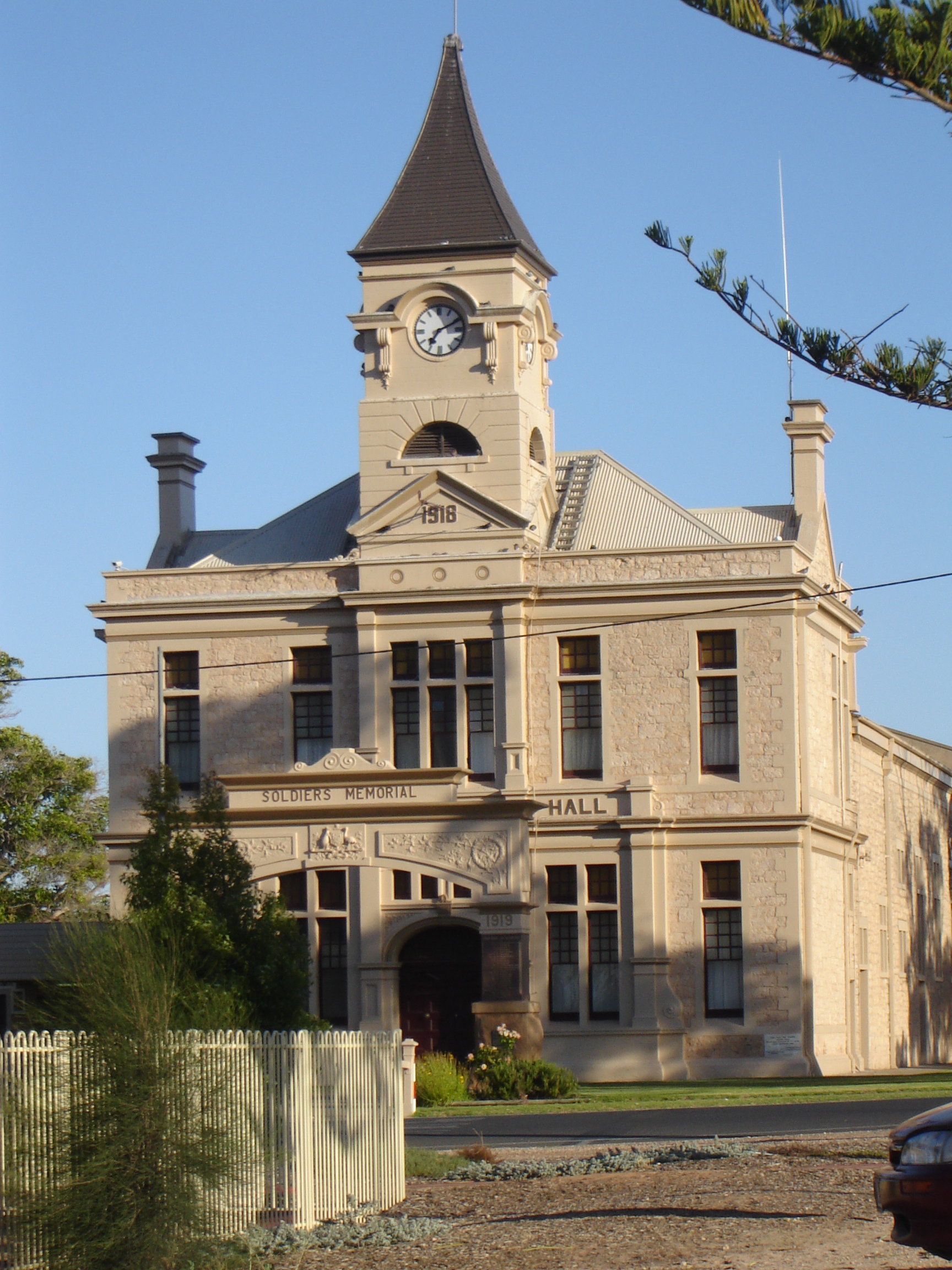
- Wallaroo Town Hall

- Coordinates: 33°55′0″S 137°37′0″E
- Country: Australia
- State: South Australia
- LGA: Copper Coast
- Location: 160 km (99 mi) NNW of Adelaide
- Established: 1851

Government
  - State electorate: Narungga
  - Federal division: Grey
- Elevation: 44 m (144 ft)

Population
  - Total: 4,241 (UCL 2021)
- Postcode: 5556
- Mean max temp: 23.0 °C (73.4 °F)
- Mean min temp: 10.8 °C (51.4 °F)
- Annual rainfall: 386.7 mm (15.22 in)
Localities around Wallaroo
Spencer Gulf	North Beach; Wallaroo Plain	Wallaroo Plain
Spencer Gulf	Wallaroo	Kadina
Spencer Gulf	Warburto	Kadina

Wallaroo is a port town on the western side of Yorke Peninsula in South Australia, 160 kilometres (100 mi) northwest of Adelaide. It is one of the three Copper Triangle towns famed for their historic shared copper mining industry, and known together as "Little Cornwall", the other two being Kadina, about 8 kilometres (5 mi) to the east, and Moonta, about 18 kilometres (11 mi) south. At the 2021 Census, Wallaroo had a population of 4,241.

== Description ==
Wallaroo is about 18 kilometres (11 mi) north of Moonta and 8 kilometres (5.0 mi) west of Kadina. Since 1999, the rural broadacre farming area to the north of the town has been officially known as Wallaroo Plain The area south of Wallaroo is Warburto. The Warburto railway station name was derived from the Narungga name for a nearby spring.

== History ==
=== Aboriginal ===
The Narungga are the group of Indigenous Australians whose traditional lands include what is now termed Yorke Peninsula in South Australia. The name "Wallaroo" comes from the Aboriginal word wadlu waru, meaning wallaby urine. The early settlers tried to copy the Aboriginals by calling it Walla Waroo. However, they found this too big to stamp on the wool bales, so they shortened it to Wallaroo. During the early years of European settlement, the Narungga maintained a healthy population, but it has since declined.

=== European ===
Matthew Flinders was the first European to visit the location. When he sailed by on 16 March 1802, he recorded that "the intermediate coast ... which extends several leagues to the north of the point, is low and sandy, but a few miles back it rises to a level land of moderate elevation, and is not ill-clothed with small trees." Wallaroo was first settled in 1851 by a sheep grazier, Robert Miller. In 1857, Walter Watson Hughes purchased the land and named it "Walla Waroo". The name was subsequently shortened to "Wallaroo". Copper was soon discovered in the Kadina area in 1859, and in Moonta (in a wombat hole) in 1861. Confusingly, the famous Wallaroo Mines were at Kadina, not Wallaroo. There were no copper mines at Wallaroo itself, although Wallaroo became a smelting and harbour town, not a mining town.

The copper smelter was established in 1861. Wallaroo settlement was established on Wallaroo Bay by 1861 and was proclaimed as a government town on 29 January 1862. In June of that year, the cadastral Hundred of Wallaroo was proclaimed, allowing the surrounding land from coast to Wallaroo Mines to be allotted and sold as sections. The smelter grew and developed to eventually become the largest copper smelter outside of Wales. In addition to copper, the smelter also produced gold and lead, and included a sulphuric acid works, forming the largest and most important producer in Spencer Gulf, until the Port Pirie smelters were established in 1890. Trading prospered, and a jetty was built in 1861 for ships to bring in coal, timber, food and mining equipment. The first load of refined copper was shipped in 1862, and by 1868 over 100 tons were produced each week.

Wallaroo was connected to Kadina by horse-drawn tramway in 1862 and to Moonta in 1866. By 1865, the population of Wallaroo was 3,000, and soon the government town was incorporated as the Town of Wallaroo on 25 June 1874. The 'Wallaroo Bay Football Club' was founded in 1867 and by the early 1880s was renamed the 'Wallaroo Football Club' reflecting the town's name. A rail connection to Adelaide was completed by 1880. Distilled sulphuric acid was also produced and superphosphate was manufactured between the 1890s and 1920s. The area's population peaked at 5,000 in 1920, and Wallaroo was Yorke Peninsula's largest and most important port until when copper production ceased in 1923. An automatic grain loader was built on the town's third jetty in 1958 and is currently in use. The local railway yards expanded to a significant size, but the use of the line diminished and it was closed in the 1990s and pulled up in 2017. Today Wallaroo remains as a major grain port.

== Heritage listings ==
Wallaroo has a number of heritage-listed sites, including:

- 1 Jetty Road: Wallaroo Customs House
- John Terrace: Wallaroo railway station
- 1 John Terrace: Old Wallaroo Police Station and Dwelling
- 32 Lydia Terrace: Wallaroo Courthouse
- 8 Stirling Road: Wallaroo Wesleyan Methodist Church
- Wallaroo Smelters Site

== Geography and climate ==
Wallaroo exists in a grain farming area with a moderate to low rainfall. It is located on the foreshore and is 13 metres above sea level. Wallaroo has a dry Mediterranean climate with seasonal temperatures a few degrees above Adelaide's temperatures. The temperature ranges are similar to those of Kadina and the weather patterns are similar to those of Kadina and Adelaide. In the summer Wallaroo has a light cool sea breeze on hot afternoons that sometimes makes the hottest afternoons more bearable than further inland.

== Media ==
Wallaroo was home to a number of historic publications. One of these, the Wallaroo Times, went through a series of evolutions, namely:

- Wallaroo Times and Mining Journal (1 February 1865 – 31 December 1881)
- Wallaroo Times (4 January 1882 – 28 July 1888)
- Kadina and Wallaroo Times (1 August 1888 – March 1966)
- Kadina, Wallaroo and Moonta Times (7 April 1966 – 29 August 1968)
- Yorke Peninsula Country Times (4 September 1968 – present)

Another publication was the Wallaroo Wheatsheaf (December 1911 – November 1918), which was produced monthly by Roland Campbell for Wallaroo Amalgamated Co-operative Society Ltd. Its successor, Wheatsheaf (December 1918 – 16 June 1921), used the subtitle "an official organ of the Co-operative Movement of South Australia, application being made for registration as a newspaper".

== Economy ==
Historically, Wallaroo was part of the "copper triangle" copper mining industry. One of the large mining chimneys still stands, aptly named the 'big stack'. Copper mining ceased in the area in the 1920s, but the old copper smelter is now a tourist attraction. From the 1880s onwards the most important economic driver in the area has been cereal cropping, despite the proximity to Goyder's Line, which traditionally marks the geographic edges of agricultural viability in South Australia. Wallaroo is a significant sea port in South Australia and is the point of international export for many agricultural products originating on Yorke Peninsula and nearby parts of the South Australian Mid North. This especially includes seeds and grain products via the Wallaroo Grain Terminal. Wallaroo's surrounds are used for growing barley, wheat and other crops such as legumes, canola, chickpeas and field peas.

Tourism associated with the copper mining history and marine leisure activity has become a major part of Wallaroo's economy in the latter 1900s. The three-day Kernewek Lowender Cornish festival is held every odd year in May, with Kadina, Moonta and Wallaroo each hosting the festival for one day. From the 1990s, beachfront development in the town has accelerated with new housing developments situated at Office and North beaches. The Copper Cove Marina commenced construction at North Beach in 1997 and expects, on completion, to contain a total of 154 marina berths with a proportionate number of new residential and commercial plots. The marina development is almost one third of the size of the original township (prior to 1997).

== Transport ==
Wallaroo is at the western end of the Copper Coast Highway and on the Spencer Highway. The Balaklava-Moonta and Kadina-Brinkworth railway lines closed in the 1990s. From the 1990s until 2009, the Lions Club of Yorke Peninsula Rail operated tourist services between Wallaroo, Kadina and Bute on some Sundays on the previously disused railway line. Grain is transported to the storage near the wharf by road, and loaded to ships by conveyor belts at the Wallaroo jetty. The jetty is also regarded as one of the best scuba diving sites in South Australia. The water is only 5–6 metres deep so can also be enjoyed by snorkellers and free-divers.

A passenger and vehicle ferry has run intermittently between Wallaroo and Lucky Bay (near Cowell) on Eyre Peninsula.

Nearby Kadina Airport caters to general aviation and emergency services users, although there are no scheduled passengers flight as of 2024.

== Governance ==
The Copper Coast Council governs Wallaroo at the municipal level, replacing the former Corporate Town of Wallaroo which existed from 1874 to 1997. As such, it remains part of the Hundred of Wallaroo which itself is part of the County of Daly. Wallaroo lies in the state electoral district of Narungga and the federal electoral Division of Grey.

== Notable people ==
- Caroline Carleton, writer of "Song of Australia"
- Ernest Cowan, Western Australian member of parliament
- Adam Goodes, Australian rules footballer and dual Brownlow Medal winner
- Leslie Heath, South Australian member of parliament.
- Sir Walter Watson Hughes, Pioneer philanthropist, founder of the University of Adelaide
- Leslie Renfrey, cricketer

== Gallery ==
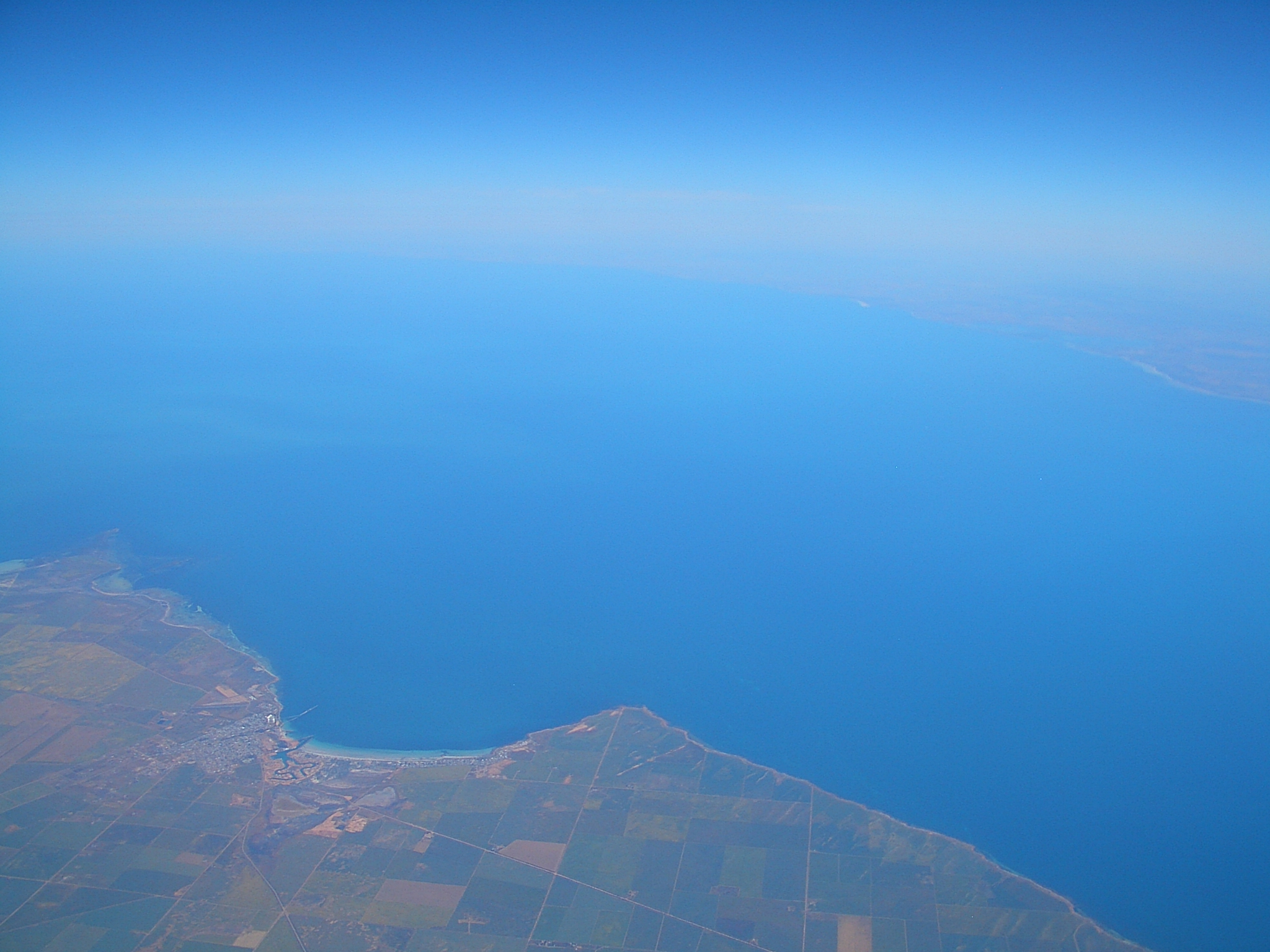
Aerial view looking west

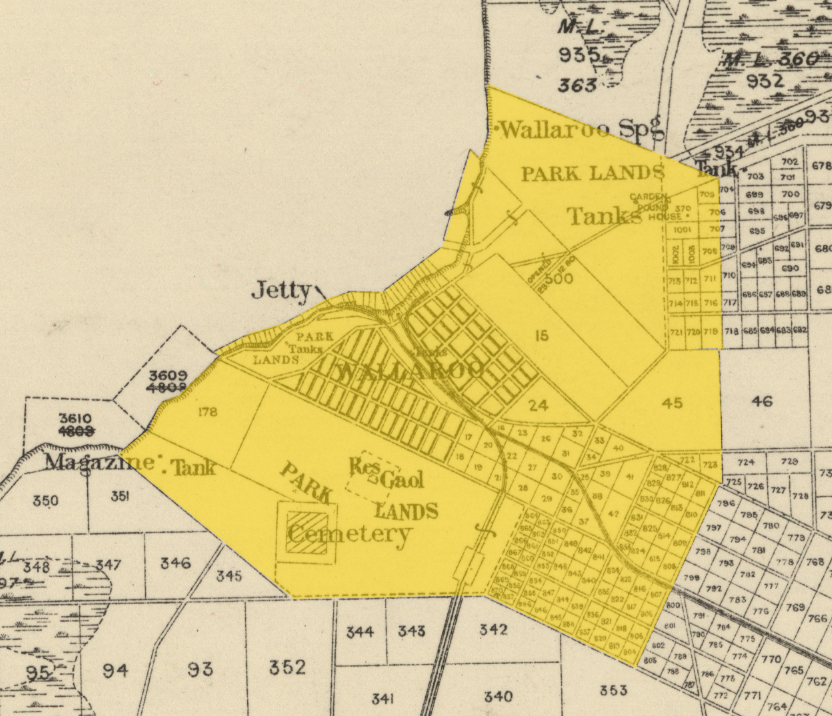
Town map, 1874

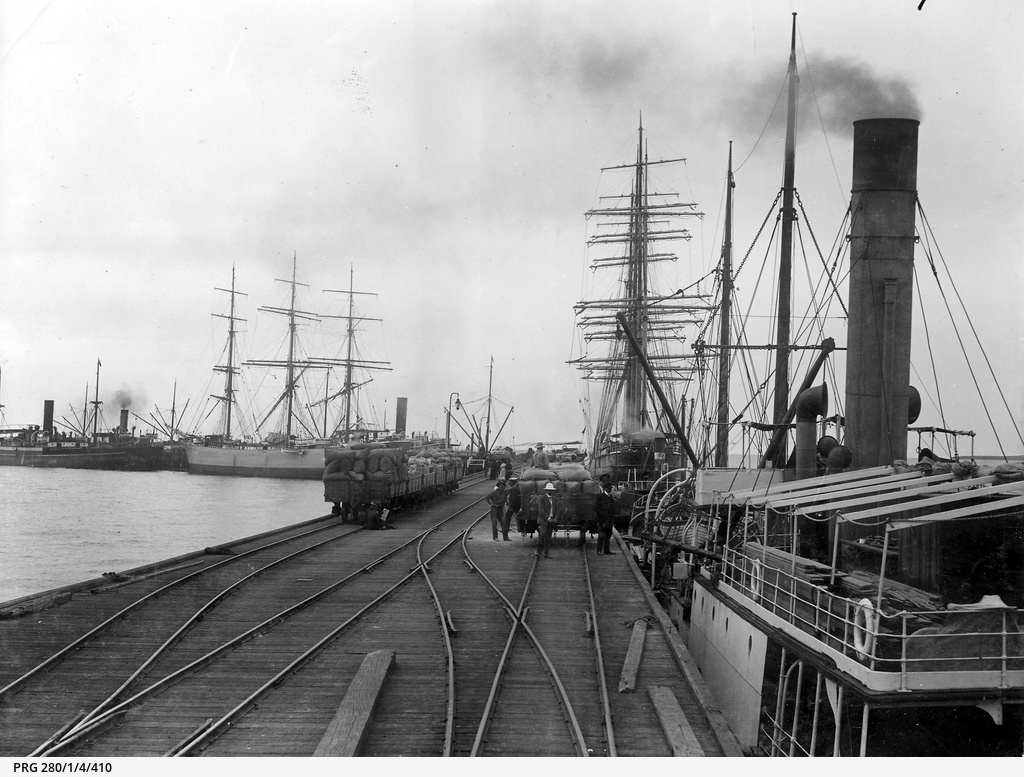
Jetty in 1909

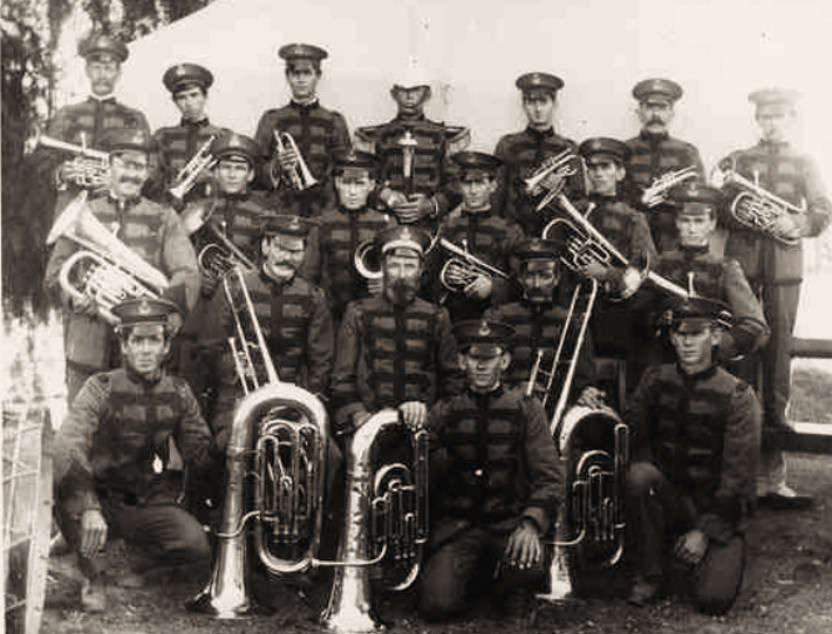
Mines Federal Band, 1910

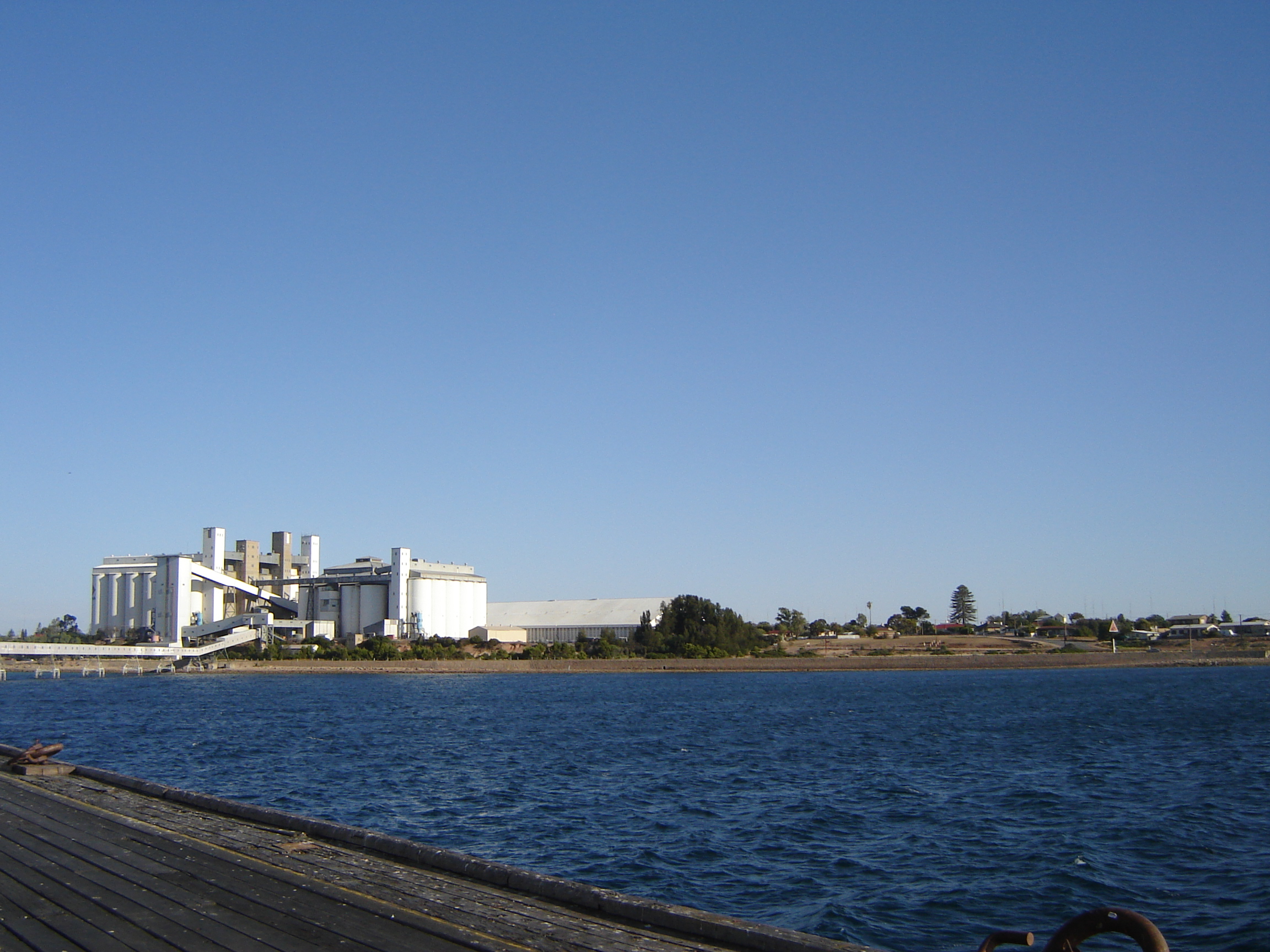
Foreshore with silo

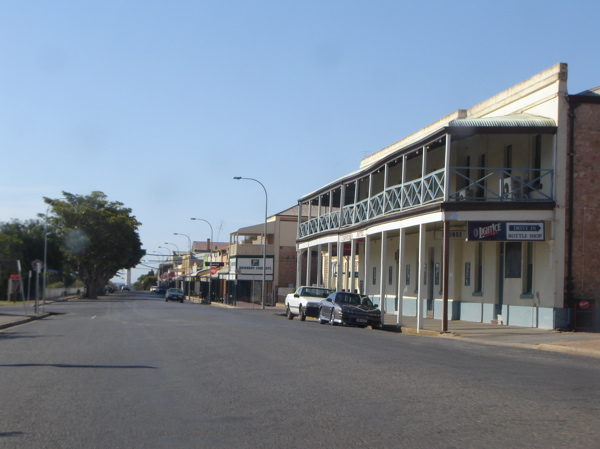
Shops along Cornish Terrace

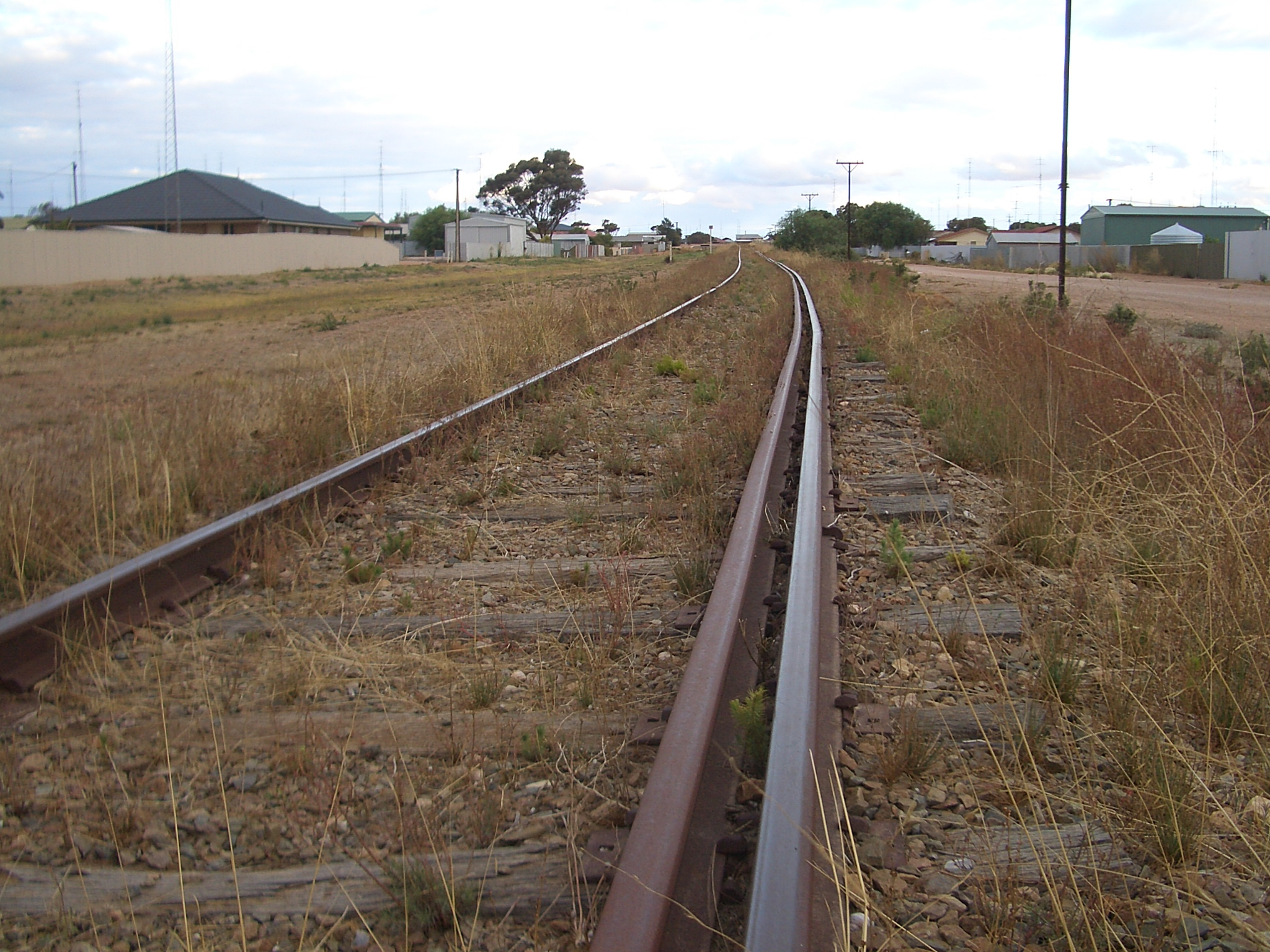
Disused dual-gage rails

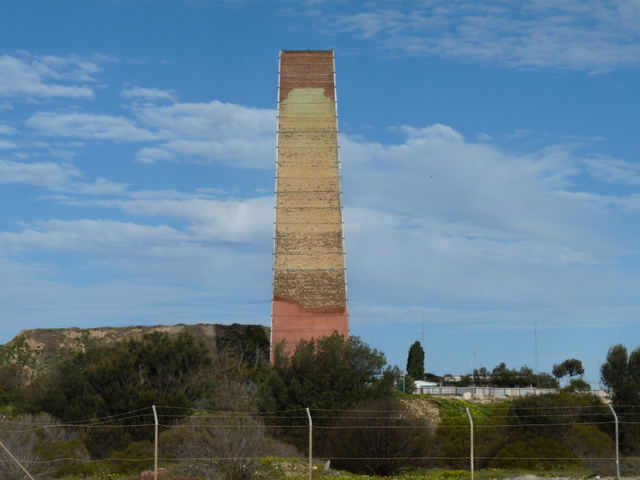
Disused copper smelter chimney

== See also ==
- Copper Coast
- Kernewek Lowender
- HMS Wallaroo (1890) named after the town
- HMAS Wallaroo (1942) named after the town
