= Copper Coast Council =

Coordinates: 33°58′00″S 137°43′00″E

- Local government area
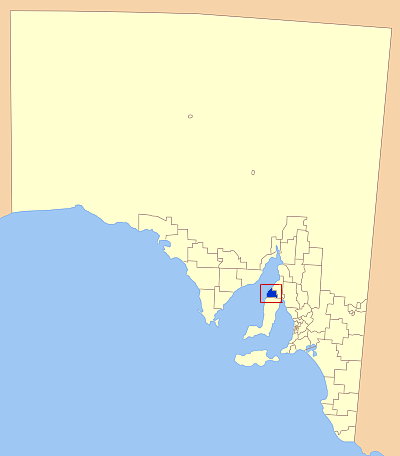
- Copper Coast Council shown within South Australia

- Interactive map of Copper Coast Council
- Country: Australia
- State: South Australia
- Region: Yorke and Mid North
- Established: 6 February 1997
- Council seat: Kadina

Government
  - Mayor: Roslyn Talbot
  - State electorate: Narungga
  - Federal division: Grey

Area
  - Total: 773 km^{2} (298 sq mi)

Population
  - Total: 15,050 (LGA 2021)
- Website: Copper Coast Council
LGAs around Copper Coast Council
Spencer Gulf	Barunga West	Barunga West
Spencer Gulf	Copper Coast Council	Barunga West
Yorke Peninsula Council	Yorke Peninsula Council	Yorke Peninsula Council

The Copper Coast Council is a local government area in the Australian state of South Australia located at the northern end of the Yorke Peninsula. It was established in 1997 and its seat is in Kadina.

== Description ==
The Copper Coast Council is located at the northern end of Yorke Peninsula adjoining the coastline with Spencer Gulf between the settlement in Tickera in the north and the northern boundary of Nalyappa in the south. The council seat is located at Kadina where its head office is located, while it maintains sub-offices at Moonta and Wallaroo.

It covers an area of about 773 square kilometres (298 sq mi) of which 97.5% is used for agricultural purposes and with the remaining 2.5% (i.e. 19 square kilometres (7.3 sq mi)) being associated with three urban areas centred on the former government towns of Kadina, Moonta and Wallaroo. A fourth settlement, Paskeville, is located on the Copper Coast Highway in the east of the local government area. The area's population counted at the 2016 census was 12,949.

== History ==
The District Council of the Copper Coast was formed on 6 February 1997 through the amalgamation of the former District Council of Northern Yorke Peninsula and the Corporation of the Town of Wallaroo. In July 2017, the name was changed to the present designation.

== Geography ==
The council includes the towns and localities of Boors Plain, Cross Roads, Cunliffe, East Moonta, Hamley, Jericho, Jerusalem, Kadina, Kooroona, Matta Flat, Moonta, Moonta Bay, Moonta Mines, New Town, North Beach, North Moonta, North Yelta, Paramatta, Port Hughes, Thrington, Wallaroo, Wallaroo Mines, Wallaroo Plain, Warburto, Willamulka and Yelta, and parts of Paskeville and Tickera.

== Councillors ==
The Copper Coast Council has a directly elected mayor.

Ward	Councillor	Notes
Unsubdivided	Roslyn Talbot	Mayor
Unsubdivided	Andrew Male	
Unsubdivided	Peter Oswald	
Unsubdivided	Sandra Paddick	
Unsubdivided	Neil Sawley	
Unsubdivided	Bruce Schmidt	
Unsubdivided	Peter Sims	Deputy Mayor
Unsubdivided	Matthew Stock	
Unsubdivided	Cathy Vluggen	
Unsubdivided	Brent Walker	

=== Mayors ===
- William Ivan Oates (1997–2000)
- Paul Thomas (2000–2018)
- Roslyn Talbot (current)

== See also ==
- Kernewek Lowender- the biennial Copper Coast festival celebrating the local Cornish heritage
- Yorke Peninsula Field Days
- List of parks and gardens in rural South Australia
