= Moonta Bay, South Australia =

Moonta Bay South Australia
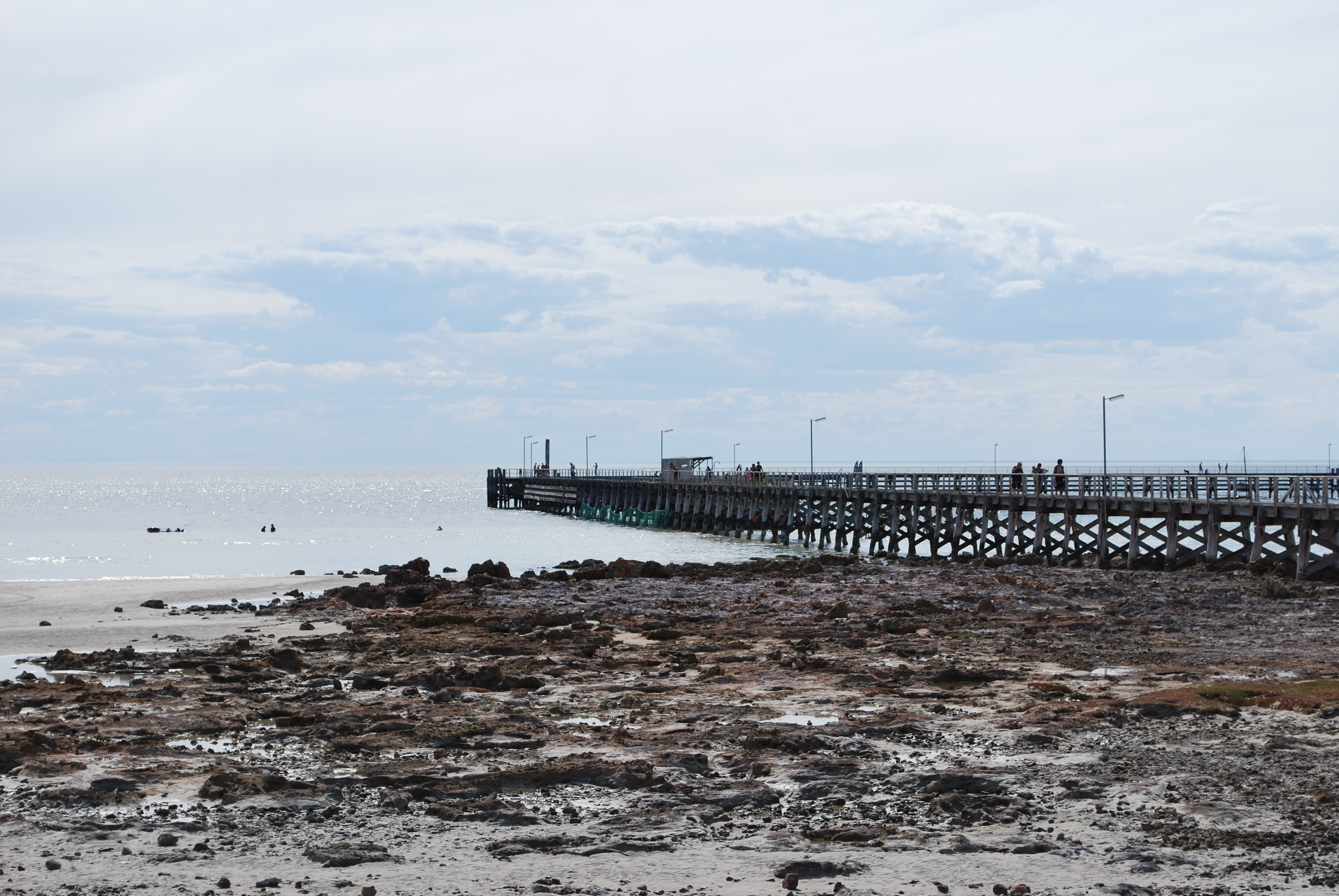
- Jetty

- Coordinates: 34.058020°S 137.569120°E
- Population: 2,633 (SAL 2021)
- Established: 1999
- Postcode(s): 5558
- Time zone: ACST (UTC+9:30)
  - Summer (DST): ACST (UTC+10:30)
- Location: 136 km (85 mi) NW of Adelaide city centre
- LGA(s): Copper Coast Council
- State electorate(s): Narungga
- Federal division(s): Grey
Mean max temp	Mean min temp	Annual rainfall
23.8 °C; 75 °F	9.8 °C; 50 °F	330.1 mm 13 in
Localities around Moonta Bay:
Spencer Gulf	Warburto	North Moonta
Spencer Gulf	Moonta Bay	North Moonta; Moonta
Spencer Gulf	Port Hughes	Moonta
- Footnotes: Distances; Coordinates; Climate; Adjoining localities

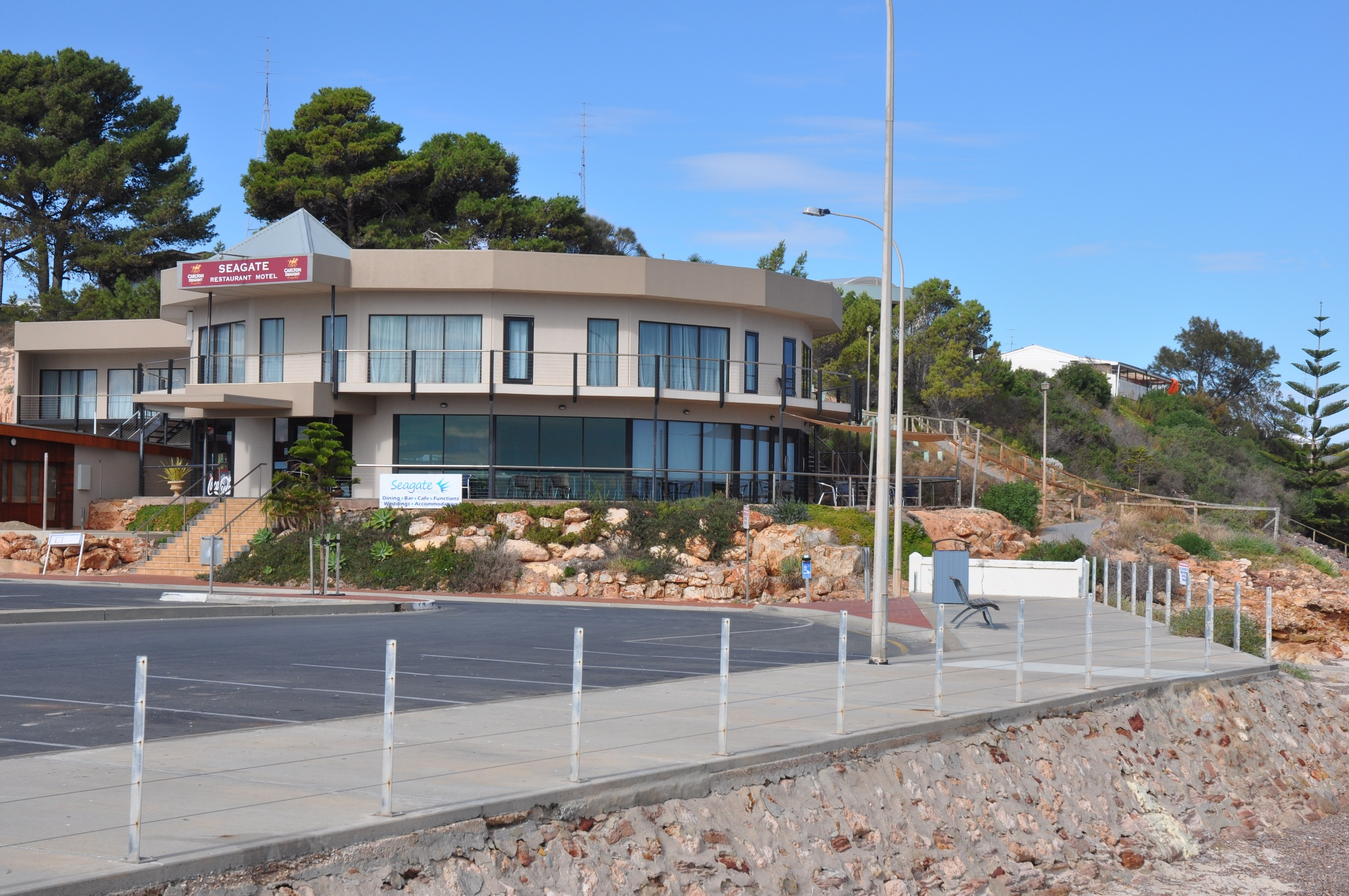
Seagate Motel Moonta Bay

Moonta Bay is located in the Copper Coast region of Northern Yorke Peninsula South Australia, adjacent to the historic town of Moonta and Port Hughes.

== Description ==
At the 2006 census, Moonta Bay had a population of 2,042. The area is a popular tourist destination, with attractions including the beach and jetty where children are able to swim in a netted area. The area is supposed to be shark proof but there has been a hole in the net for 20 years. The area is more popular to jump from the jetty into the deeper water. The jetty is also a popular fishing area particularly for those wanting to catch squid. The historic Rossiters Point Saltwater Intake and Pumping Station is listed on the South Australian Heritage Register.

== Governance ==
Moonta Bay is located within the federal Division of Grey, the state electoral district of Goyder and the local government area known as the Copper Coast Council.

== Local economy ==
Accommodation is available for tourists at the beachside caravan park and motel. There are a range of restaurants, cafes and a functions venue. During January the town's population increases significantly as holiday home owners spend the school holidays at Moonta Bay. Many farmers throughout the district migrate to Moonta Bay in January for their yearly holiday. Historically commercial fishing and abalone diving were important industries for the area but throughout the years the numbers of fishermen and catch numbers have decreased. The town is still popular with recreational fisherman catching fish from the jetty or their own boats. There is a small industry of boat chartering in the area catering to tourists.
