= Moonta, South Australia =

Moonta
- Town
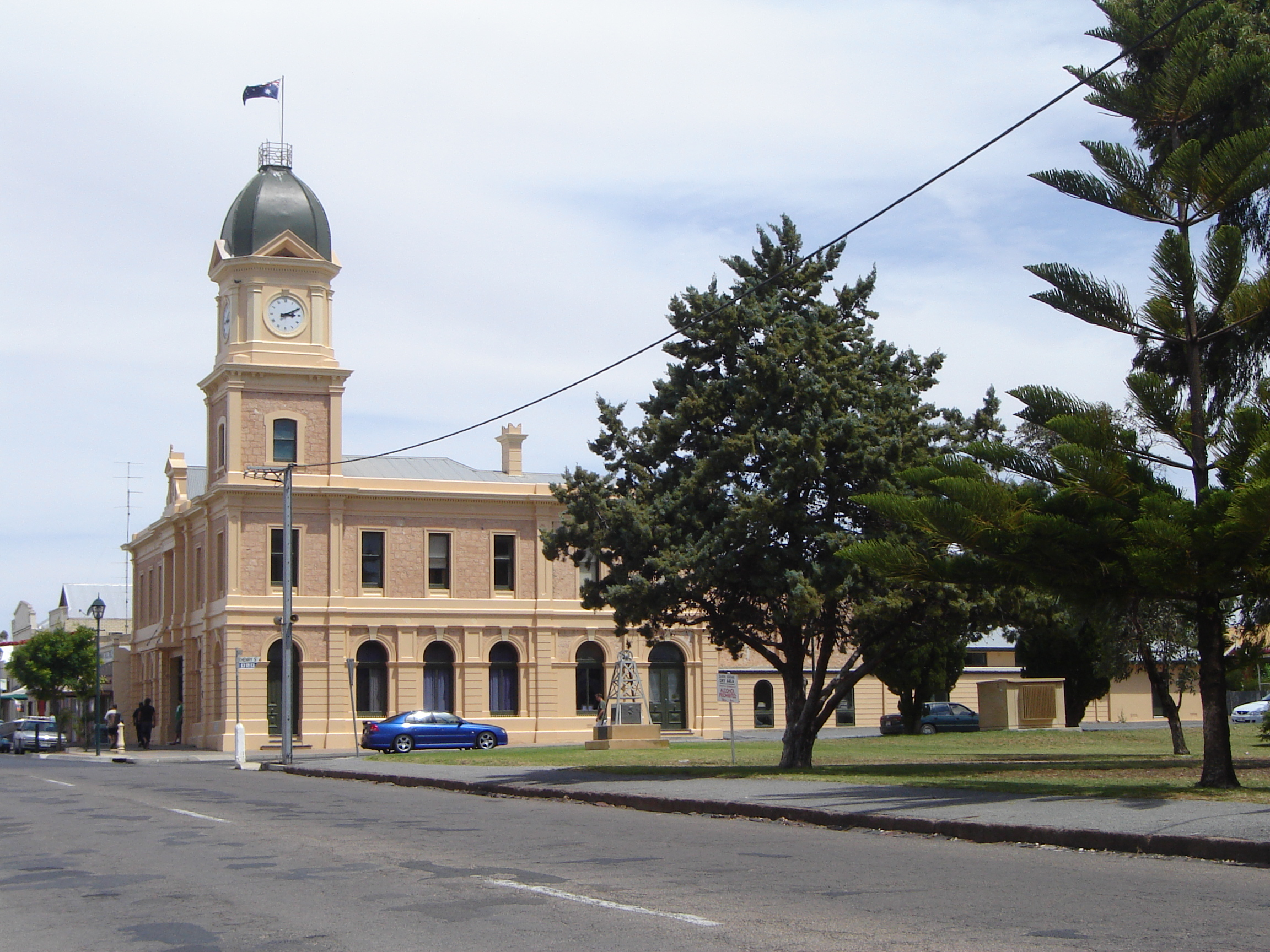
- Moonta Town Hall

- Coordinates: 34°04′00.3″S 137°35′20″E
- Country: Australia
- State: South Australia
- LGA: Copper Coast
- Location: 165 km (103 mi) NNW of Adelaide; 17 km (11 mi) SW of Kadina; 17 km (11 mi) S of Wallaroo
- Established: 1863

Government
  - State electorate: Narungga
  - Federal division: Grey
- Elevation: 44 m (144 ft)

Population
  - Total: 4,627 (UCL 2021)
- Postcode: 5558
- Mean max temp: 23.8 °C (74.8 °F)
- Mean min temp: 9.8 °C (49.6 °F)
- Annual rainfall: 330.1 mm (13.00 in)
Localities around Moonta
Moonta Bay	North Moonta	Cross Roads
Moonta Bay; Port Hughes	Moonta	Yelta
Port Hughes	Kooroona	Moonta Mines

Moonta is a town on the Yorke Peninsula of South Australia, 166 km (103 mi) north-northwest of the state capital of Adelaide. It is one of three towns known as the Copper Coast or "Little Cornwall" for their shared copper mining history.

== Description ==
The town's centre is about 17 kilometres (11 mi) south west of Kadina, site of Wallaroo Mines, and 14 kilometres (8.7 mi) south of the port of Wallaroo. There are 11 suburbs surrounding central Moonta, each being a distinct historic locality or hamlet. These are: Cross Roads, East Moonta, Hamley, Kooroona, Moonta Bay, Moonta Mines, North Moonta, North Yelta, Paramatta, Port Hughes and Yelta.

At the 2011 census, the Moonta township and the adjacent suburbs of Cross Roads and Yelta had a combined population of 681. The broader Moonta urban centre, also including Moonta Bay, North Moonta and Port Hughes, had a population of 3,659. By 2016, the area had grown to a population of 4,700, and by 2021 the population had grown further to 5,219, making it the fastest growing area on the Copper Coast.

== History ==
=== Aboriginal ===
The Moonta area is part of the traditional lands of the indigenous Narungga people. The name "Moonta" is reportedly derived from munta-muntara or moontera, an Aboriginal word for "thick scrub place" or "impenetrable scrub".

=== European ===
The Yorke Peninsula coastline near Wallaroo was separately navigated by Matthew Flinders and Nicolas Baudin in 1802. The next Europeans to explore the district were John Hill and Thomas Burr. Under instructions from Governor Gawler, the pair were landed about 15 kilometres south of Point Riley, near Moonta Bay, on 28 April 1840 from the government cutter Water Witch. They then made their way back to Adelaide on horseback, traversing Northern Yorke Peninsula. They reported the discovery of 'a very excellent tract of country'. Based on that report a few pioneering British settlers arrived in the Moonta area in the 1840s, as pastoralists, but there was no significant development until the 1860s, primarily because of the lack of water. The scrub in the area was difficult to penetrate (as testified by the town's name) so the first settlers had a hard time clearing the land.

Large and rich deposits of copper were discovered at Moonta in 1861 by Patrick Ryan, a shepherd from Walter Hughes' property. This became a prosperous mine, named Wheal Hughes, with other mines soon to follow. The government town of Moonta was surveyed in March 1863, while an informal township of mining workers also grew at Moonta Mines. A horse tramway from Moonta to the port at Wallaroo opened in July 1866. Starting in the 1880s, agitation for conversion of the horse tramway to a steam locomotive railway commenced.

Following advertising by the South Australian Government, Cornish miners arrived in Moonta in large numbers. The government town of Moonta incorporated as the Corporate Town of Moonta in 1872. The mines at Moonta proved to be the richest mines in the whole of South Australia by 1917, exceeding the total wealth created by all other mines since 1836, the year of establishment of South Australia. The population of Moonta in 1875 was 12,000. The main copper mining operations at Moonta Mines ceased in 1923, although a number of smaller mines continued to be worked for some years. Smaller-scale operations recommenced in the area in the late 1980s but had closed by the mid-1990s.

Following the demise of copper mining, the district successfully merged into dry-land farming. Moonta's surrounds are used for growing barley, wheat and other crops such as legumes, canola, chickpeas and field peas. Barley from the region is considered to be some of the best in the world.

Historical population
Year	Pop.	±%
1921	1,334	—
1933	1,507	+13.0%
1947	1,221	−19.0%
1954	1,220	−0.1%
1961	1,151	−5.7%
1966	1,702	+47.9%
1971	1,570	−7.8%
1976	1,017	−35.2%
1981	1,924	+89.2%
1986	2,199	+14.3%
1991	2,723	+23.8%
1996	2,898	+6.4%
2001	3,068	+5.9%
2006	3,350	+9.2%
2011	3,656	+9.1%
2016	4,174	+14.2%
2021	4,627	+10.9%
Source: Australian Bureau of Statistics data.

== Heritage listings ==
Moonta's town centre, consisting of old limestone miners' cottages and churches, gives the town a historical feel. Moonta has a number of heritage-listed sites listed on the South Australian Heritage Register, including:

- Blanche Terrace: All Saints Anglican Church
- Blanche Terrace: Moonta Masonic Hall
- 21 Ellen Street: Bank of South Australia Building
- 29 Ellen Street: Moonta School of Mines
- Kadina Road: Moonta railway station

== Geography and climate ==
Moonta exists in a semi-arid location, above Goyder's Line. Moonta is surrounded by mallee scrub. The centre is located four kilometres inland and is 20 metres above sea level. Moonta has a dry Mediterranean climate with seasonal temperatures about the same as Adelaide's temperatures. The temperature ranges are similar to those of Kadina and the weather patterns are similar to those of both Kadina and Adelaide.

== Economy ==
Tourism is a significant local industry, focusing on the availability of beach-side accommodation, including several caravan parks, holiday houses, bed and breakfast and a motel. The nearby locations of Moonta Bay, Port Hughes and Simms Cove are on the foreshore and are rapidly developing. They are extremely popular locations for retirement and holiday makers. The beaches, with fine white sand, are popular with recreational anglers and sailboarders. The natural state of the coast has largely been retained. The popular three-day Kernewek Lowender Cornish festival is also held every odd year in May in the Copper Coast towns of Moonta, Kadina and Wallaroo, with events staged across the three towns over several days. It was awarded South Australia's Inaugural Top Tourist Town by TICSA in 2021.

The National Trust of South Australia operates a number of heritage attractions in adjacent Moonta Mines, including a narrow gauge railway through the former mining works, a museum in the former Moonta Mines Model School, a sweet shop, former mining cottage and surviving buildings associated with the mines. The former Moonta railway station is now a visitor information centre.

== Governance ==
Moonta is located within the local government area of the Copper Coast Council, which was formed in 1997 (replacing the Corporate Town of Moonta, which existed from 1872 to 1984, and the District Council of Northern Yorke Peninsula). As such, it remains part of the Hundred of Wallaroo which itself is part of the County of Daly. It is also part of the federal division of Grey, the state electoral district of Narungga.

== Media ==
Moonta was served by The People’s Weekly (17 May 1890 – 22 September 1961). The newspaper was then renamed to Moonta People’s Weekly (29 September 1961 – 31 March 1966), which then merged with the Kadina and Wallaroo Times (1 August 1888 to March 1966) to form the short-lived Kadina, Wallaroo and Moonta Times (7 April 1966 – 29 August 1968). In 1968 that paper then merged with the South Australian Farmer (9 January 1948 – 28 August 1968) to form the Yorke Peninsula Country Times, which still serves the entire peninsula.

== Gallery ==
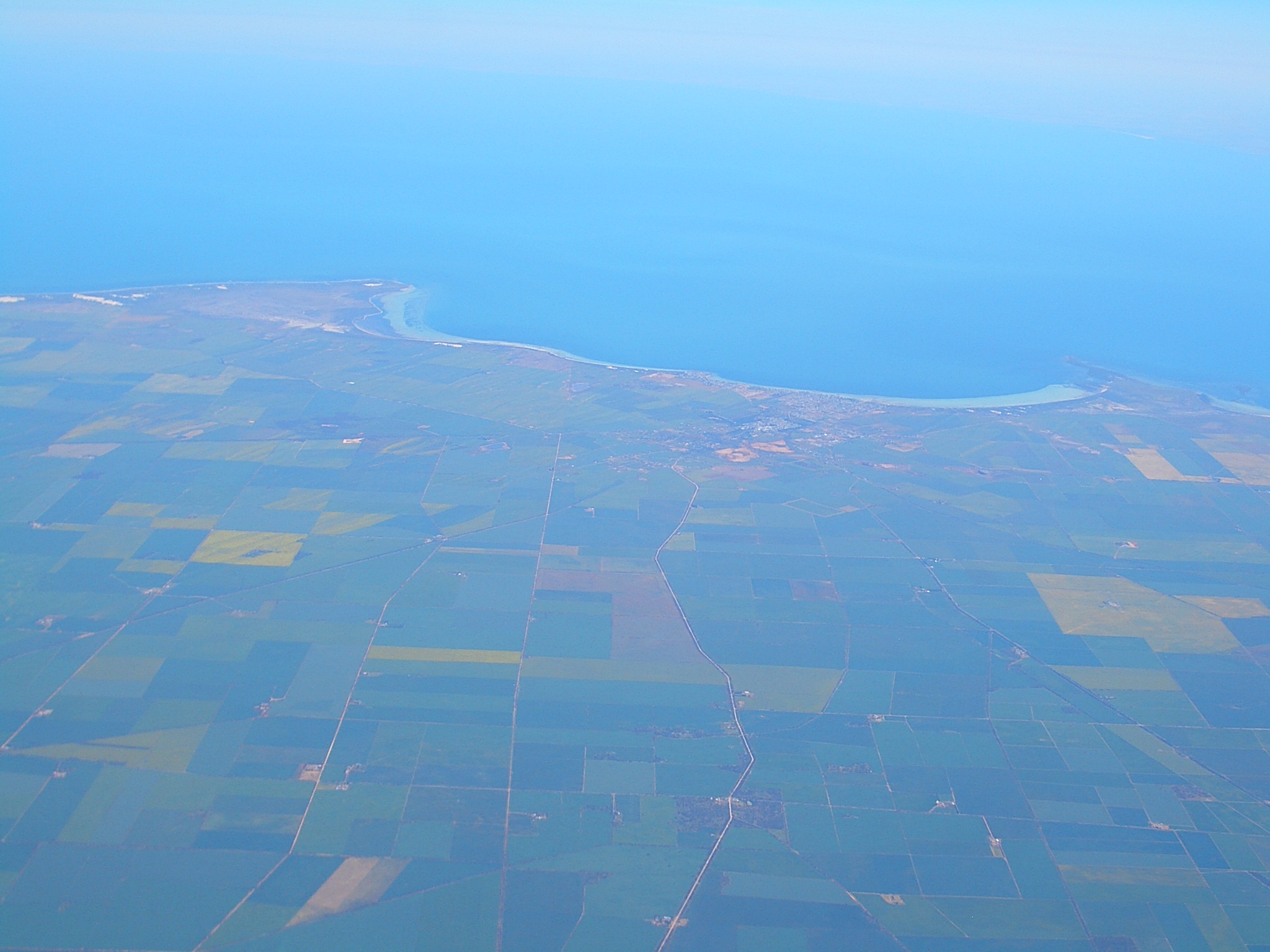
Aerial view of Moonta, looking west into Spencer Gulf

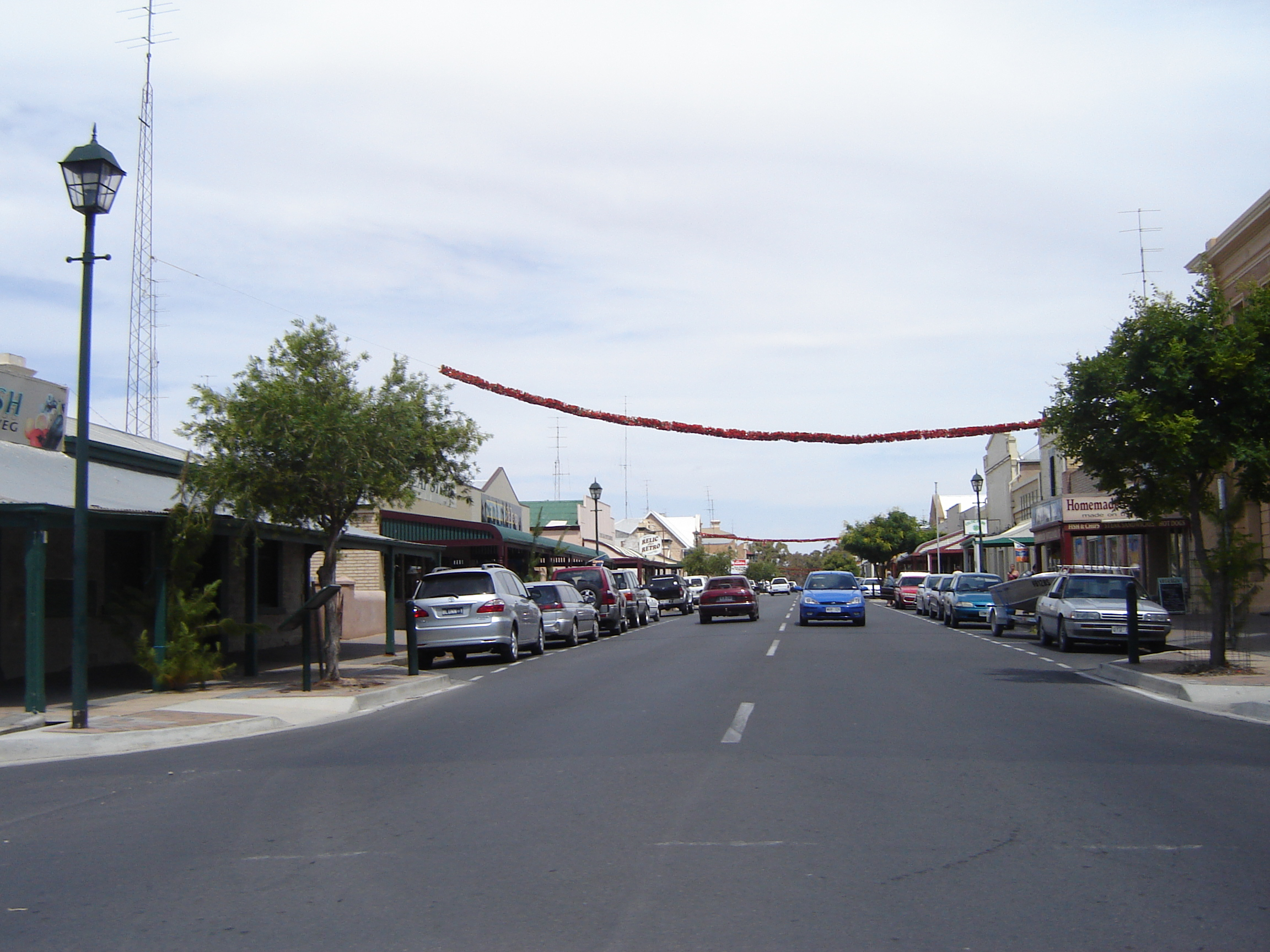
Shops along George Street, Moonta

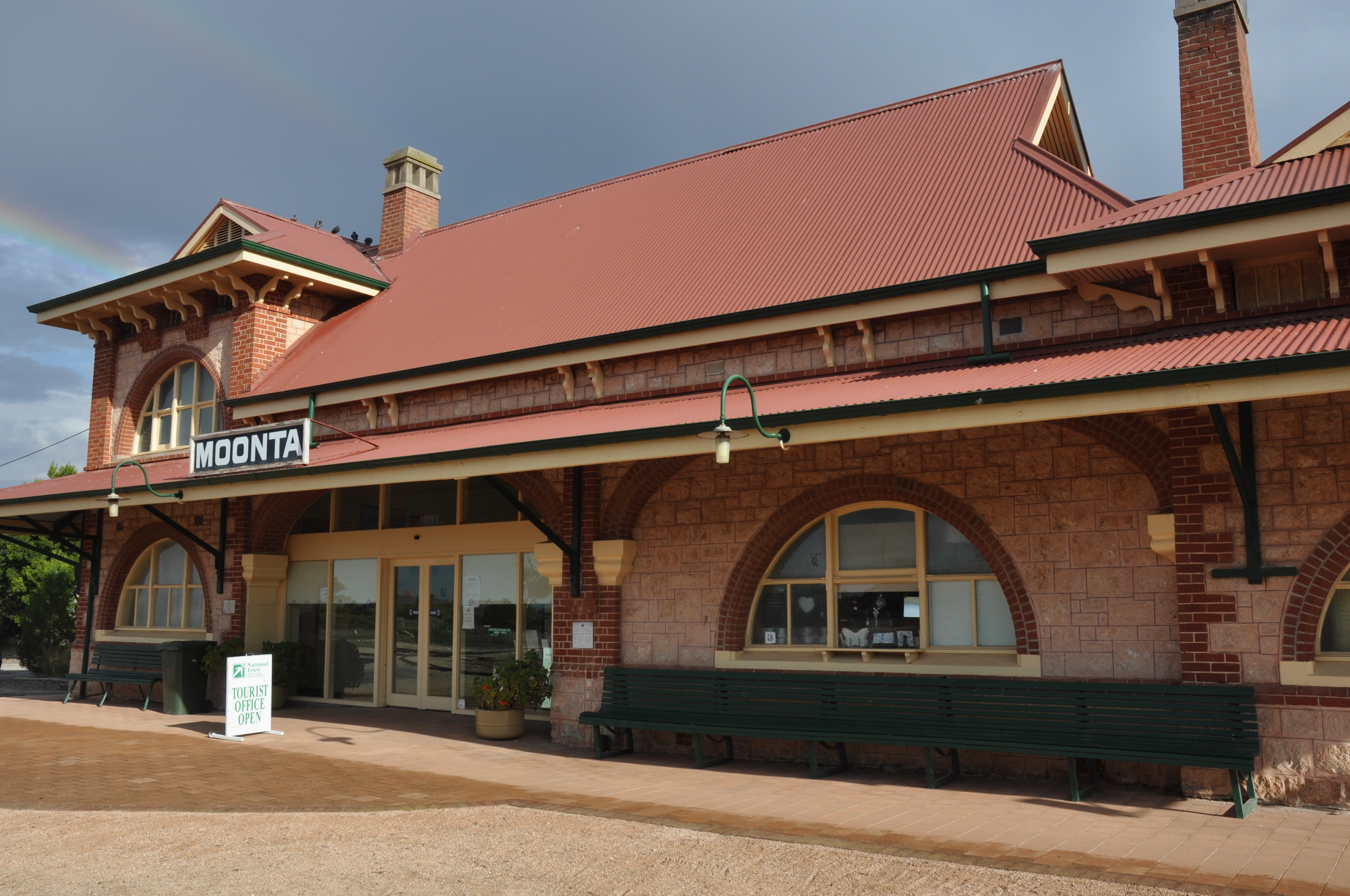
Moonta Railway Station

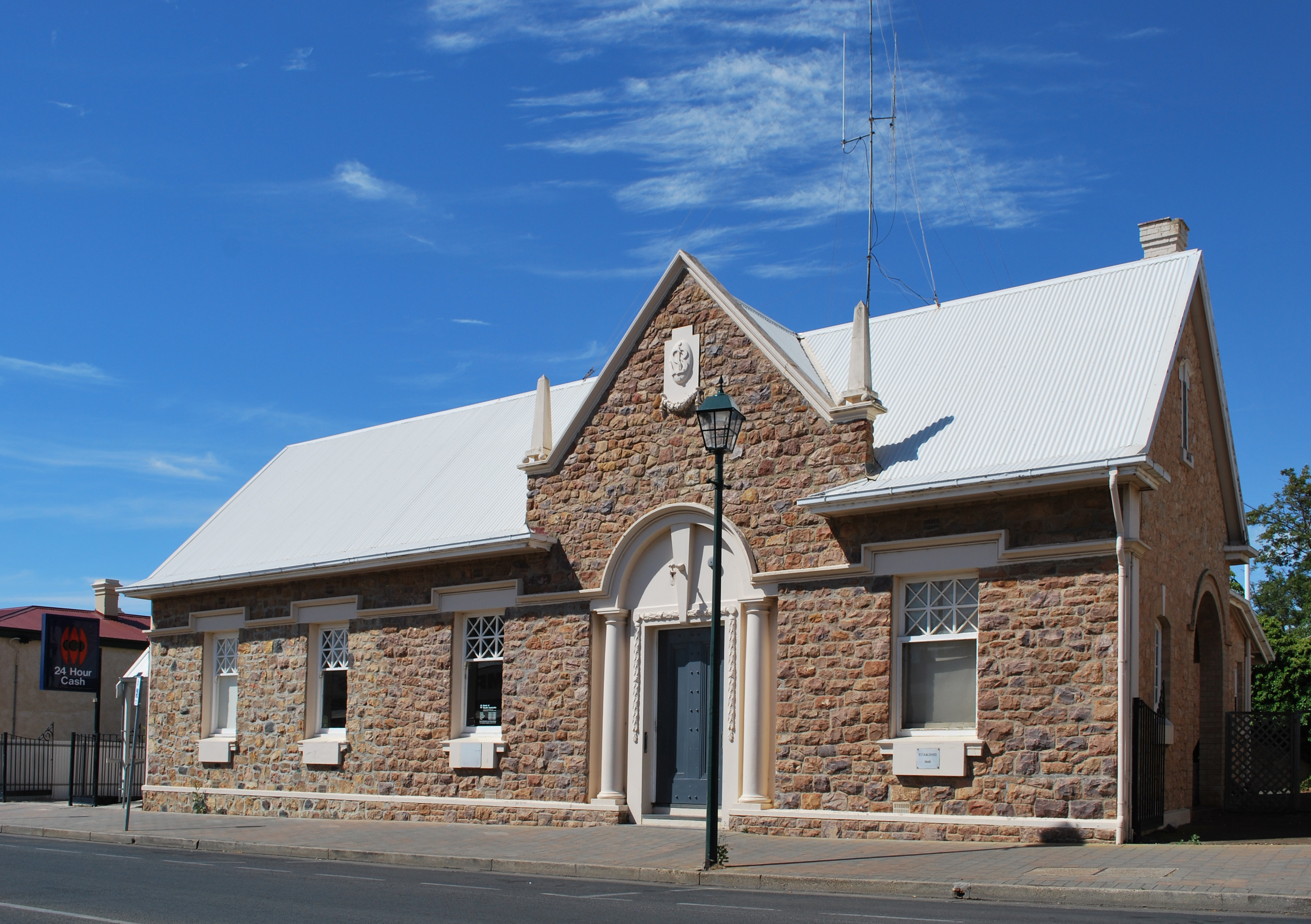
Former Bank of South Australia

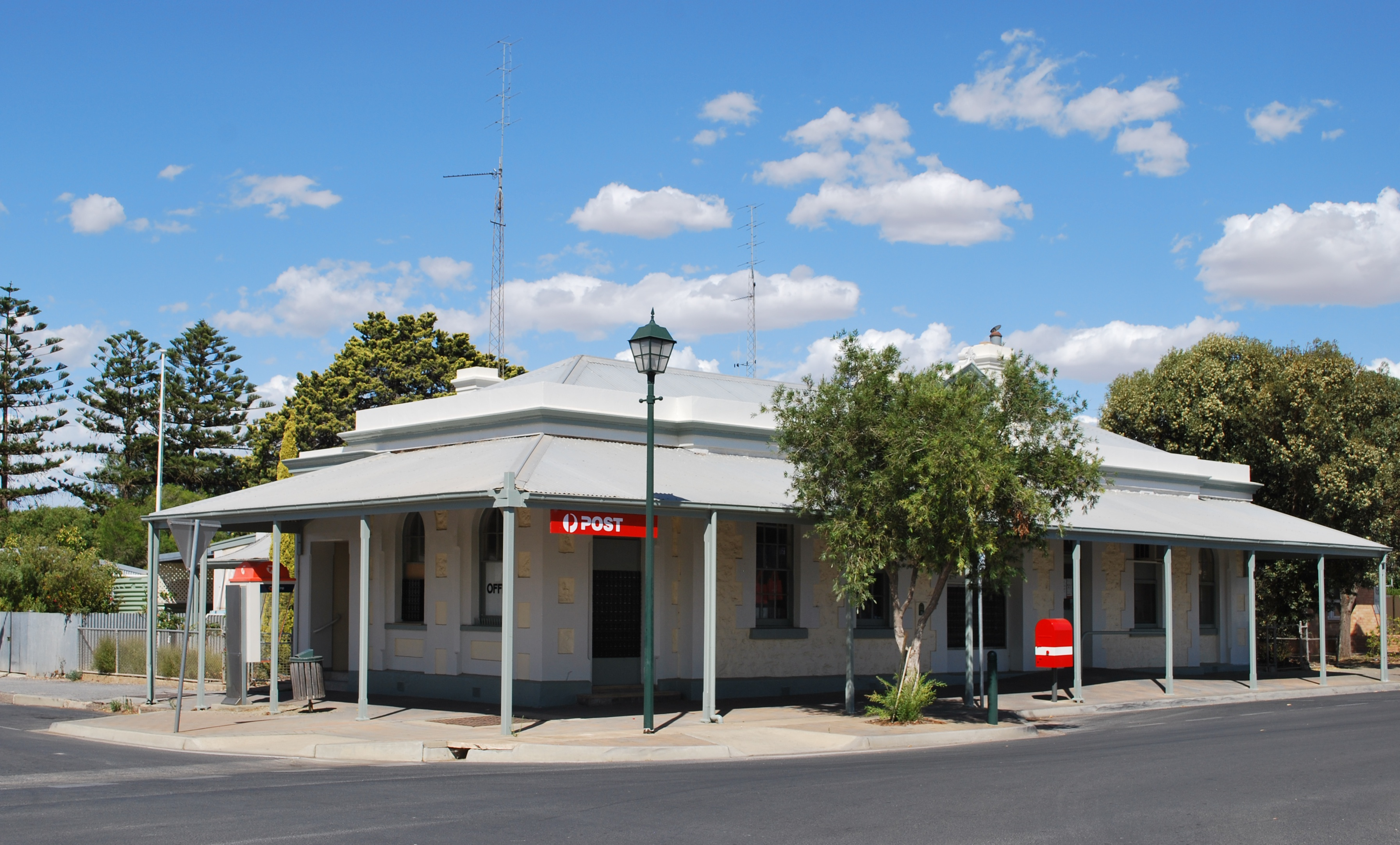
Post office

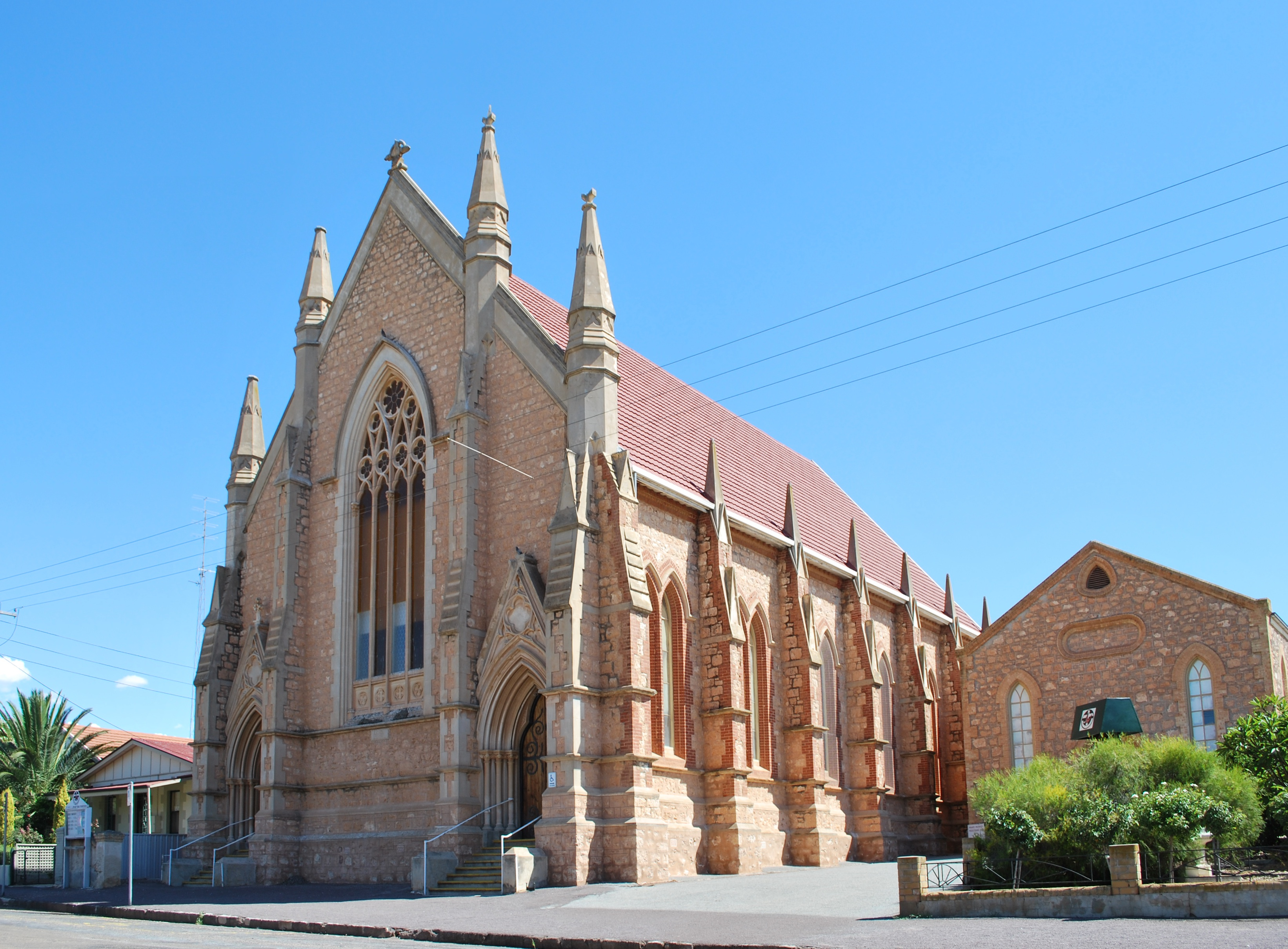
Moonta Uniting Church

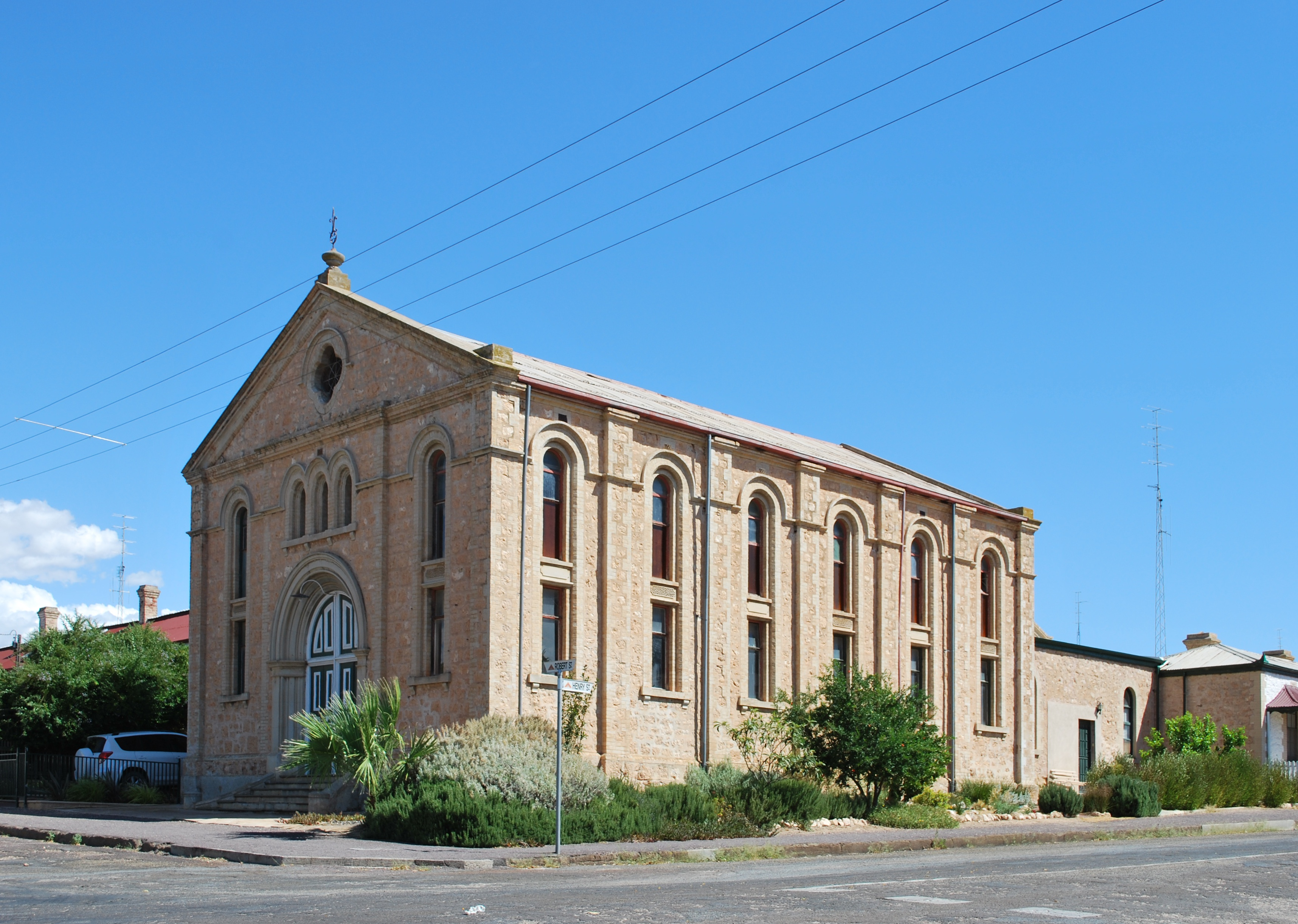
Former church

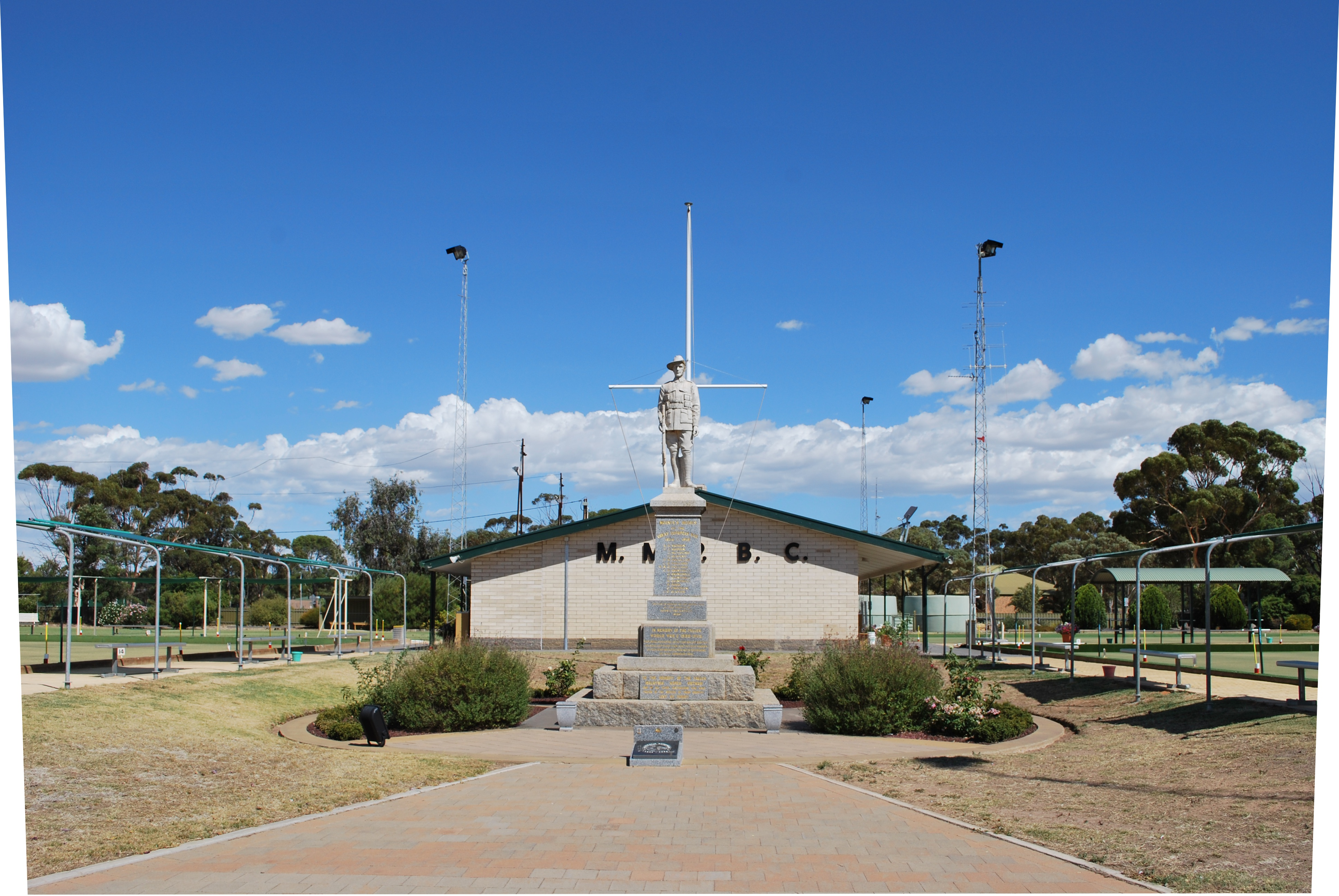
War Memorial

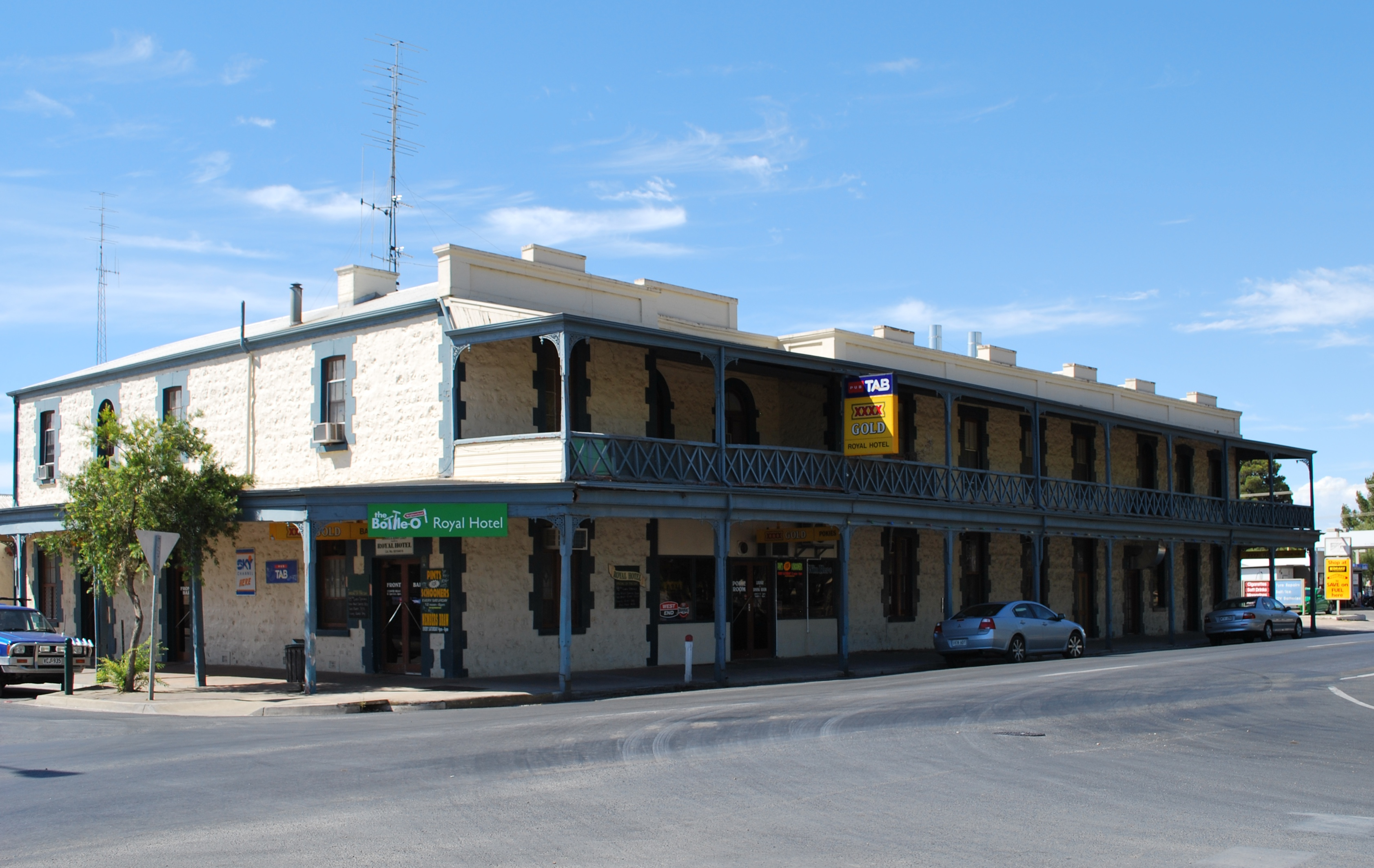
Royal Hotel, Moonta

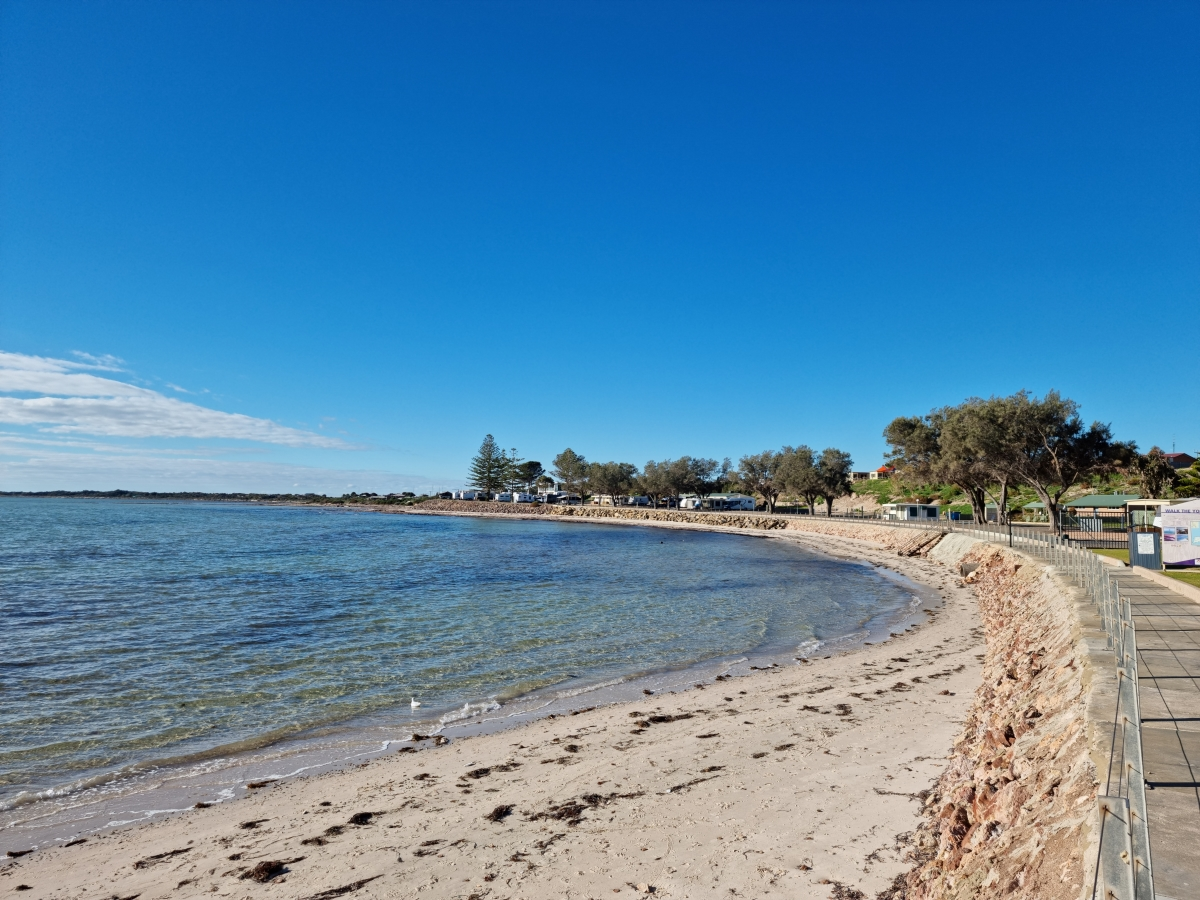
Moonta Coastline

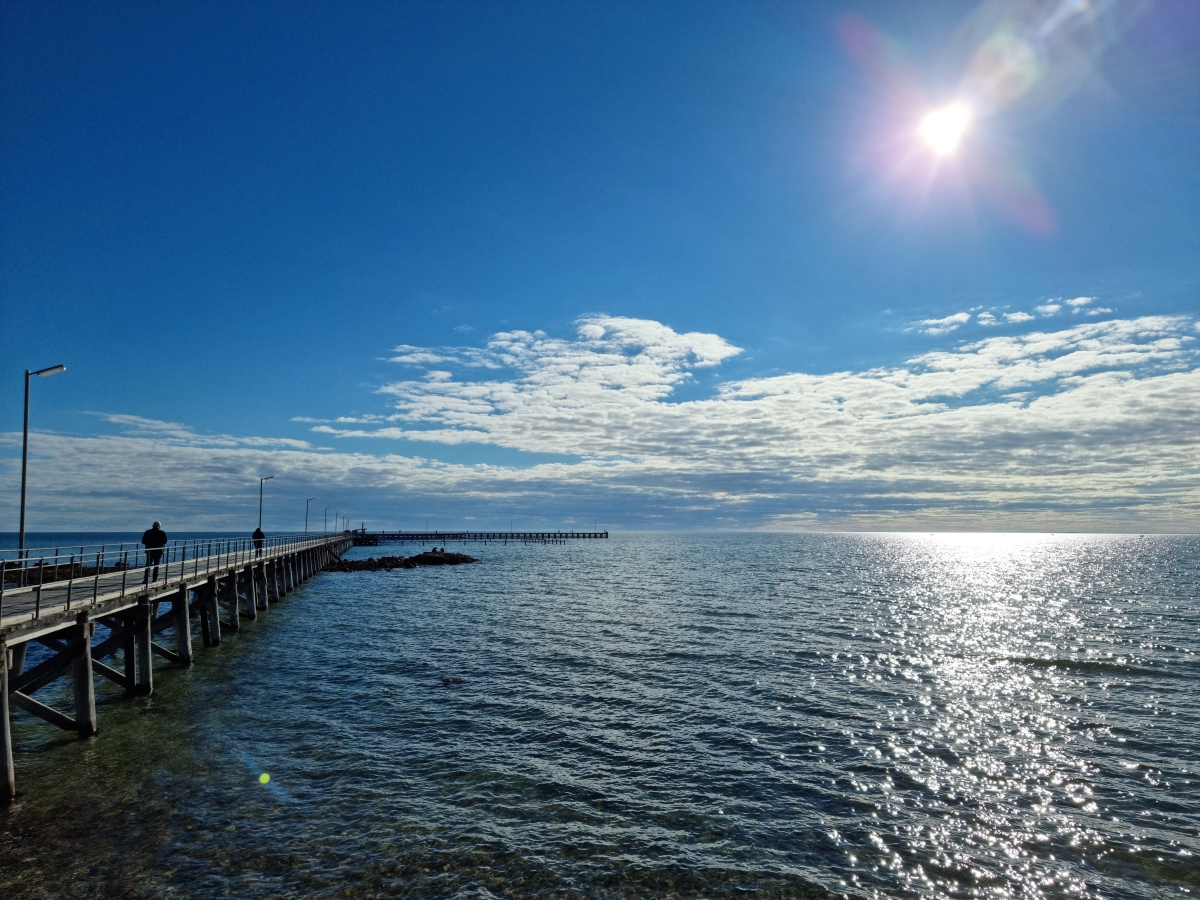
Moonta Jetty

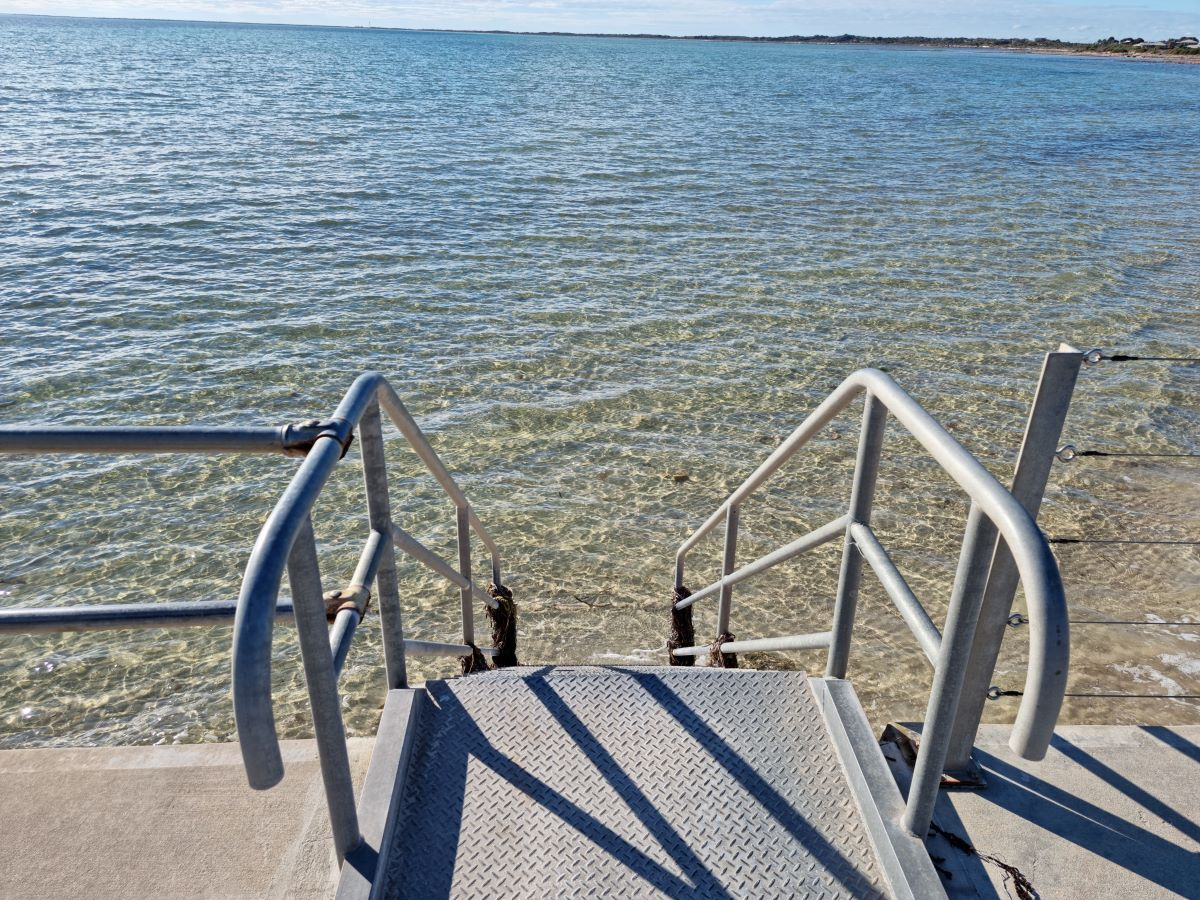
Moonta Jetty Stairs
