= Electoral results for the district of Forrest =

Western Australian district election results

This is a list of electoral results for the Electoral district of Forrest in Western Australian state elections.

== Members for Forrest ==
Member	Party	Term
Albert Wilson	Labor	1904–1906
Albert Wilson	Independent	1906–1908
Peter O'Loghlen	Labor	1908–1910
Dennis Jones	Labor	1910
Peter O'Loghlen	Labor	1910–1913
Thomas Moore	Labor	1913
Peter O'Loghlen	Labor	1913–1923
John Holman	Labor	1923–1925
May Holman	Labor	1925–1939
Edward Holman	Labor	1939–1947
Alfred Reynolds	Labor	1947–1950

== Election results ==
=== Elections in the 1940s ===
1947 Western Australian state election: Forrest
Party	Candidate	Votes	%	±%
Labor	Alfred Reynolds	1,572	48.9	−51.1
Liberal	David Johnstone	1,209	37.6	+37.6
Country	Keith Porteous	437	13.6	+13.6
Total formal votes		3,218	98.0	
Informal votes		65	2.0	
Turnout		3,283	81.8	
Two-party-preferred result
Labor	Alfred Reynolds	1,644	51.1	−48.9
Liberal	David Johnstone	1,574	48.9	+48.9
Labor hold		Swing	N/A	

1943 Western Australian state election: Forrest
Party	Candidate	Votes	%	±%
Labor	Edward Holman	unopposed		
Labor hold		Swing		

=== Elections in the 1930s ===
1939 Forrest state by-election
Party	Candidate	Votes	%	±%
Labor	Edward Holman	2,155	63.6	−3.0
Independent	Carlyle Ferguson	1,231	36.4	+3.0
Total formal votes		3,386	98.6	−0.4
Informal votes		47	1.4	+0.4
Turnout		3,433	85.4	−3.6
Labor hold		Swing	−3.0	

1939 Western Australian state election: Forrest
Party	Candidate	Votes	%	±%
Labor	May Holman	2,318	66.6	−33.4
Nationalist	Percy Rettallack	1,161	33.4	+33.4
Total formal votes		3,479	99.0	
Informal votes		36	1.0	
Turnout		3,515	89.0	
Labor hold		Swing	N/A	

1936 Western Australian state election: Forrest
Party	Candidate	Votes	%	±%
Labor	May Holman	unopposed		
Labor hold		Swing		

1933 Western Australian state election: Forrest
Party	Candidate	Votes	%	±%
Labor	May Holman	2,480	72.7	+6.9
Country	William Hollingsworth	933	27.3	+8.5
Total formal votes		3,281	96.3	−3.0
Informal votes		132	3.7	+3.0
Turnout		3,545	85.4	+9.4
Labor hold		Swing	N/A	

1930 Western Australian state election: Forrest
Party	Candidate	Votes	%	±%
Labor	May Holman	2,216	65.8	
Country	James Egan	634	18.8	
Nationalist	Frank George	517	15.4	
Total formal votes		3,367	99.3	
Informal votes		23	0.7	
Turnout		3,390	76.0	
Labor hold		Swing		

=== Elections in the 1920s ===
1927 Western Australian state election: Forrest
Party	Candidate	Votes	%	±%
Labor	May Holman	unopposed		
Labor hold		Swing		

1925 Forrest state by-election
Party	Candidate	Votes	%	±%
Labor	May Holman	unopposed		
Labor hold		Swing		

1924 Western Australian state election: Forrest
Party	Candidate	Votes	%	±%
Labor	John Holman	unopposed		
Labor hold		Swing		

1923 Forrest state by-election
Party	Candidate	Votes	%	±%
Labor	John Holman	603	66.1	N/A
Independent	John Brosnan	200	21.9	+21.9
Independent	Dennis Jones	110	12.0	+12.0
Total formal votes		913	98.0	
Informal votes		19	2.0	
Turnout		932	38.5	

- Preferences were not distributed.

1921 Western Australian state election: Forrest
Party	Candidate	Votes	%	±%
Labor	Peter O'Loghlen	unopposed		
Labor hold		Swing		

=== Elections in the 1910s ===
1917 Western Australian state election: Forrest
Party	Candidate	Votes	%	±%
Labor	Peter O'Loghlen	unopposed		
Labor hold		Swing		

1914 Western Australian state election: Forrest
Party	Candidate	Votes	%	±%
Labor	Peter O'Loghlen	unopposed		
Labor hold		Swing		

July 1913 Forrest state by-election
Party	Candidate	Votes	%	±%
Labor	Peter O'Loghlen	1,257	81.9	N/A
Liberal	Harold Tuckfield	277	18.1	+18.1
Total formal votes		1,534	98.8	
Informal votes		18	1.2	
Turnout		1,552	44.3	
Labor hold		Swing	N/A	

April 1913 Forrest state by-election
Party	Candidate	Votes	%	±%
Labor	Thomas Moore	unopposed		
Labor hold		Swing		

1911 Western Australian state election: Forrest
Party	Candidate	Votes	%	±%
Labor	Peter O'Loghlen	unopposed		
Labor hold		Swing		

July 1910 Forrest state by-election
Party	Candidate	Votes	%	±%
Labor	Peter O'Loghlen	834	86.0	N/A
Ministerialist	Albert Wilson	136	14.0	+14.0
Total formal votes		970	98.8	
Informal votes		12	1.2	
Turnout		982	35.5	
Labor hold		Swing	N/A	

March 1910 Forrest state by-election
Party	Candidate	Votes	%	±%
Labor	Dennis Jones	unopposed		
Labor hold		Swing		

=== Elections in the 1900s ===
1908 Western Australian state election: Forrest
Party	Candidate	Votes	%	±%
Labour	Peter O'Loghlen	unopposed		
Labour hold		Swing		

1905 Western Australian state election: Forrest
Party	Candidate	Votes	%	±%
Labour	Albert Wilson	unopposed		
Labour hold		Swing		

1904 Western Australian state election: Forrest
Party	Candidate	Votes	%	±%
Labour	Albert Wilson	751	77.5	+77.5
Independent	George Baxter	218	22.5	+22.5
Total formal votes		969	99.8	n/a
Informal votes		2	0.2	n/a
Turnout		971	40.0	n/a
Labour win		(new seat)		
