= Cornish Australians =

Australians of Cornish heritage

Ostralians kernewek (Cornish)

Total population
- 768,100 (1996 estimate)

Regions with significant populations
- South Australia, Victoria, Western Australia

Languages
- Australian English, Cornish

Religion
- Christianity

Related ethnic groups
- British Australians (Scottish Australians, Welsh Australians, English Australians, Manx Australians), Irish Australians

Cornish Australians (Cornish: Ostralians kernewek) are citizens of Australia who identify as being of Cornish heritage or descent, an ethnic group native to Cornwall in the United Kingdom. Cornish diaspora is by far the largest in South Australia, being a significant part of the state's history.

Cornish Australians form part of the worldwide Cornish diaspora, which also includes large numbers of people in the US, Canada, New Zealand, South Africa, Mexico and many Latin American countries. Cornish Australians are thought to make up around 4.3 per cent of the Australian population and are thus one of the largest ethnic groups in Australia and as such are greater than the native population in the UK of just 532,300 (2011 census).

Cornish people first arrived in Australia with Captain Cook, most notably Zachary Hickes, and there were some Cornish convicts on the First Fleet, James Ruse, Mary Bryant, along with several of the early governors. The creation of South Australia, with its emphasis on being free of convicts and religious discrimination, was championed by many Cornish religious dissenting groups and Cornish people comprised a sizeable proportion of settlers to that colony. Large scale Cornish emigration to Australia did not begin until the 1840s, coinciding with the Cornish potato famine and slumps in the Cornish mining industry. The gold rushes and copper booms were major draws on Cornish people, not just from Cornwall itself, but also from other countries where they had previously settled.

In recent years the story of the Lost Children of Cornwall, child migrants sent from Cornwall to Australia up until the early 1970s, has come under intense scrutiny. The practice of sending apparently unwanted or orphaned Cornish children abroad continued long after it had been discredited and had ceased from other areas. It has been the subject of apologies by both the Australian and British prime ministers.

== Number of Cornish Australians ==
A 1996 study by Dr. Charles Price gives the total ethnic strength of Cornish Australians as 269,500 with a total population of 768,100, a number which was roughly 4.3 percent of the Australian population at the time. This is made up by 22,600 of un-mixed origin and 745,500 of mixed origin. This makes the Cornish the fourth largest Anglo-Celtic group in Australia after the English, Irish and Scottish, and the fifth largest ethnic group in Australia.

Approximately 10 percent of the population of South Australia, and over 3 percent of Australia as a whole, has significant Cornish ancestry. In the 1986 Australian Census 15,000 people reported their ancestry as Cornish, however, no figure from the 2006 Australian census has been published as to how many reported their ancestry as such in that year.

In 2011 a campaign was launched to increase the number of people writing in their Cornish ancestry on the 2011 Australian census.

== Culture ==
=== Festivals ===
The Cornish who moved to Australia brought with them many festivities and holidays. The most important being at Christmas and Midsummer.

- Christmas, amongst other things they would bring greenery inside their houses and sing their traditional carols.
- Midsummer, 24 June, was traditionally celebrated with fire. Cornish Australians used large amounts of fireworks, described as enough to bombard a town, as well as numerous bonfires. It was observed as a general holiday with large numbers of community events also took place, including many sporting events, concerts, parades and tea-treats.
- The Duke of Cornwall's birthday was observed as a general holiday.
- Whit Monday was believed to be a more important celebration than the Queen's birthday.
- St Piran's Day was celebrated during the early days in South Australia.

The Kernewek Lowender (Cornish for "Cornish happiness"), held biennially since 1973 in the South Australian towns of Moonta, Kadina and Wallaroo, is the largest Cornish festival in the world, attracting tens of thousands of visitors each year.

There have been four Cornish festivals held in the City of Bendigo since 2002. The most recent was held at Eaglehawk in March 2010 and was entitled 'Welcome Back Cousin Jack'(We welcome you 'One and All').

=== Food and drink ===
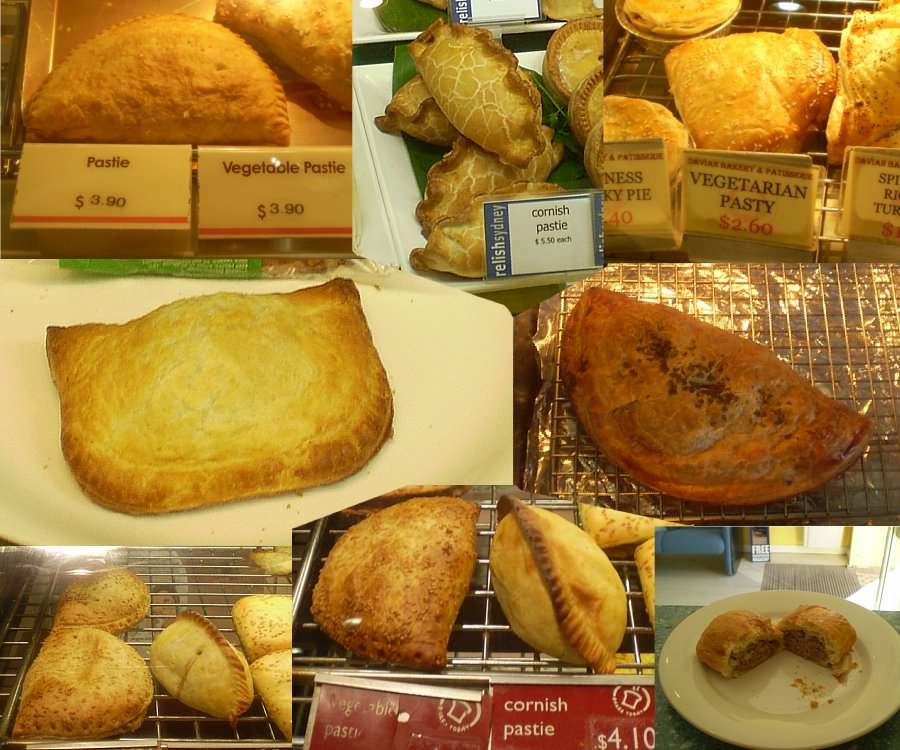
Pasties from Australia

Cornish food like the Cornish pasty remains popular in Australia. Former premier of South Australia, Don Dunstan, once took part in a pasty-making contest. Swanky beer and saffron cake were very popular in the past and have been revitalised by Kernewek Lowender and the Cornish Associations.

In the 1880s Henry Madren Leggo, whose parents came from St Just, Cornwall, began making vinegar, pickles, sauces, cordials and other grocery goods based on his mother's traditional recipes. His company, now known as Leggo's, is wrongly believed by many to be Italian.

Angove Family Winemakers, formerly Angove's, was founded by Dr W.T. Angove, a Cornish doctor who migrated to South Australia with his family in 1886. He planted vines in the outer Adelaide suburb of Tea Tree Gully, though 125 years on most of its wines are based on Riverland grapes. They have recently started producing wines from their new vineyard purchased in 2002 in McLaren Vale. The distribution company wholesales not only Angove wines and St Agnes Brandy but also Nicolas Feuillatte Champagne and a dozen other companies' wines and spirits.

Matt Wilkinson of Pope Joan in Brunswick East, Melbourne, won the Southern Final of the Great Australian Sandwichship in 2011 with his lunch roll The Cornish which won an award in its category.

=== Language ===
The Cornish language is spoken by some enthusiasts in Australia.

Members of the Gorsedh Kernow make frequent visits to Australia, and there are a number of Cornish Australian bards.

Aboriginal Australians in South Australia, particularly the Nunga, are said to speak English with a Cornish accent due to the fact that they were taught English by Cornish miners. Most large towns in South Australia had newspapers at least partially in Cornish dialect. At least 23 Cornish words have made their way into Australian English, these include the mining terms fossick and nugget.

=== Literature ===
Not Only in Stone by Phyllis Somerville is the story of emigrant Cornishwoman, Polly Thomas, who faces many trials and tribulations in the pioneering era of South Australia. The book won the South Australian Centenary novel award in 1936.

Kangaroo is D. H. Lawrence's semi-autobiographical novel based on his wartime experiences in Cornwall and subsequent visit to Australia.

D. M. Thomas is an internationally renowned Cornish author who spent part of his childhood in Australia, drawing upon his experiences in his work.

Rosanne Hawke is an author of children's books from Kapunda in South Australia.

Bruce Pascoe, who challenged the colonial historical narrative in Dark Emu, has both Cornish and Australian Aboriginal (Bunurong, Yuin and Tasmanian Aboriginal) roots.

The Gommock. Exploits of a Cornish Fool in Colonial Australia. is a historical novel by Marie S. Jackman based around the lives of a Cornish emigrant miner Yestin Tregarthy and his wife Charlotte, set at the Burra Burra copper mine in South Australia.

Nobel Prize–winning author Patrick White wrote many novels with Cornish characters and themes. His fifth novel, Voss, includes a character named Laura Trevelyan. A Fringe of Leaves portrays Cornishwoman Ellen Roxburgh née Gluyas shipwrecked on an island and living amongst the aboriginal population.

The celebrated Australian poet John Blight's ancestors arrived in South Australia on the Lisander, in 1851. In the 1987 recording John Blight he describes his Cornish background and its influence on his style.

A true life character was George Hawke. He spent his early life working as a wool stapler for the Allanson family. He was born in St Eval Parish on 2 October 1802 at his father's farm near Bedruthan. Following losses in an economic recession, George decided to emigrate to Australia. His words were recorded in a letter at age 70 years to a nephew back in Cornwall. The letter was later reproduced in full in Yvonne McBurney's book, The Road to Byng.

=== Art ===
Oswald Pryor (1881–1971) was a miner and cartoonist, born in Moonta and remembered for his humorous depictions of the lives of Cornish miners. Collections of his work include:

- Pryor, Oswald. Australia's little Cornwall, Adelaide, S. Aust.: Rigby, 1962
- Pryor, Oswald. Cousin Jacks and Jennys, Adelaide : Rigby, 1966
- Pryor, Oswald. Cornish pasty : a selection of cartoons, Adelaide : Rigby, 1976

Roger Kemp – Abstractionist Painter

=== Music ===
Cornish Christmas carols are still traditionally sung in parts of Australia, just like in Grass Valley, California. Cornish Australians have a place in the transnational Cornish carol writing tradition. The Christmas Welcome: A Choice Collection of Cornish Carols, published at Moonta in 1893, was one of several such collections published between 1890 and 1925 from Polperro to Johannesburg. The Cornish also used to decorate their houses with greenery for Christmas, a tradition that was transported with them to Australia.

Cornish male voice choirs and brass bands were once a popular part of Cornish Australian culture, but this has waned somewhat.

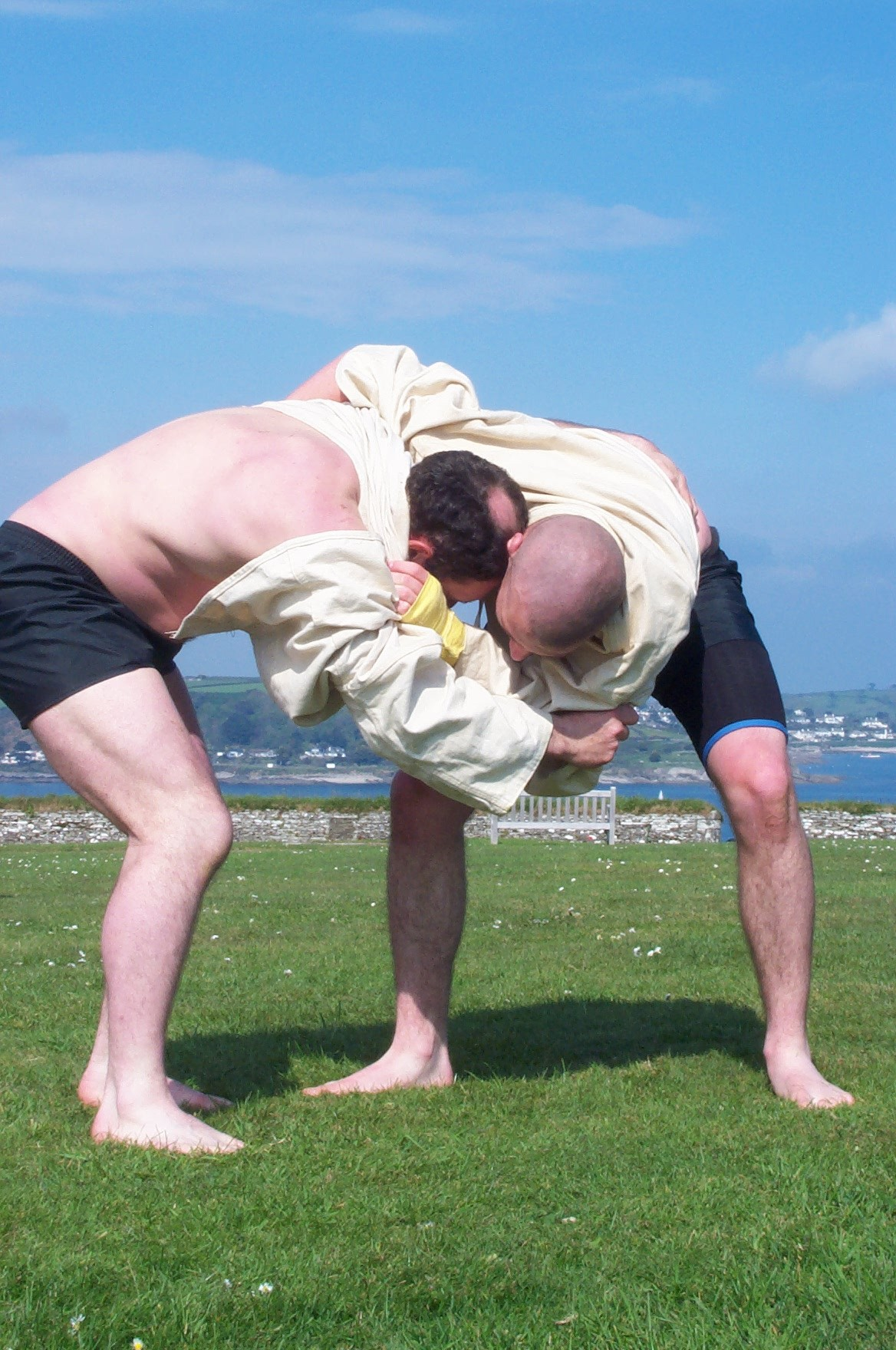
Two Cornish wrestlers

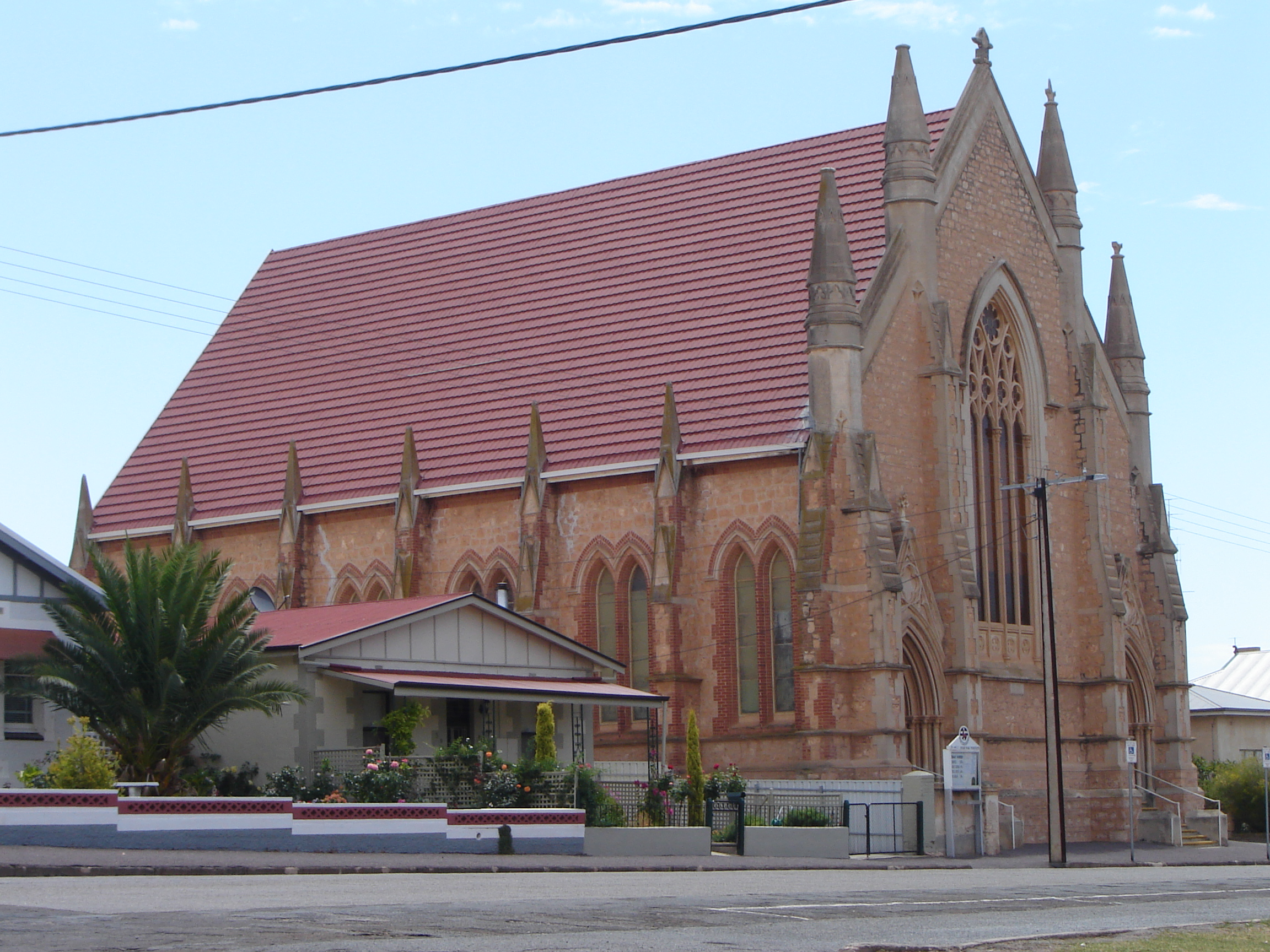
Robert Street Methodist Church, Moonta

=== Religion ===
Many Cornish settlers in Australia were Methodist and many chapels were built in the places that they settled. Others were Anglican, while few were Roman Catholic. Their Methodism was a badge of distinctive Cornishness and also gave them their trade unionist convictions. Most of the 22000 Wesleyan Methodists, 6000 Primitive Methodists and more than 6000 Bible Christians in South Australia in 1866 were Cornish.

=== Sport ===
There has been much involvement of Cornish Australians in sport over the years. Many playing rugby and cricket at an international level. This has led to the Cornish chant of "Oggie, Oggie, Oggie, Oi, Oi, Oi," taken on by all Australians as "Aussie, Aussie, Aussie."

The Cornish took some of their own sports with them to Australia. Cornish wrestling matches were a regular occurrence, held at festivities throughout the year, particularly Midsummer, Easter and Christmas. Thousands attended these contests, which were sometimes spread over several days and with wrestlers representing different mining regions. There were many Australian champion wrestlers and some of these competed internationally.

== Politics ==
The Cornish miners founded the first trade unions, and were instrumental in the formation of the Australian Labor Party. The first Labor party minority government in Tasmania (1909) was led by premier John Earle. The first Labor party majority government in South Australia (1910–12) was led by premier John Verran, a Cornishman from Gwennap. The first Labor party majority government in Western Australia (1911–16) was led by premier John Scaddan, a Cornishman from Moonta. Sir Robert Menzies founded the Liberal Party of Australia in 1944.

=== Heads of Government ===
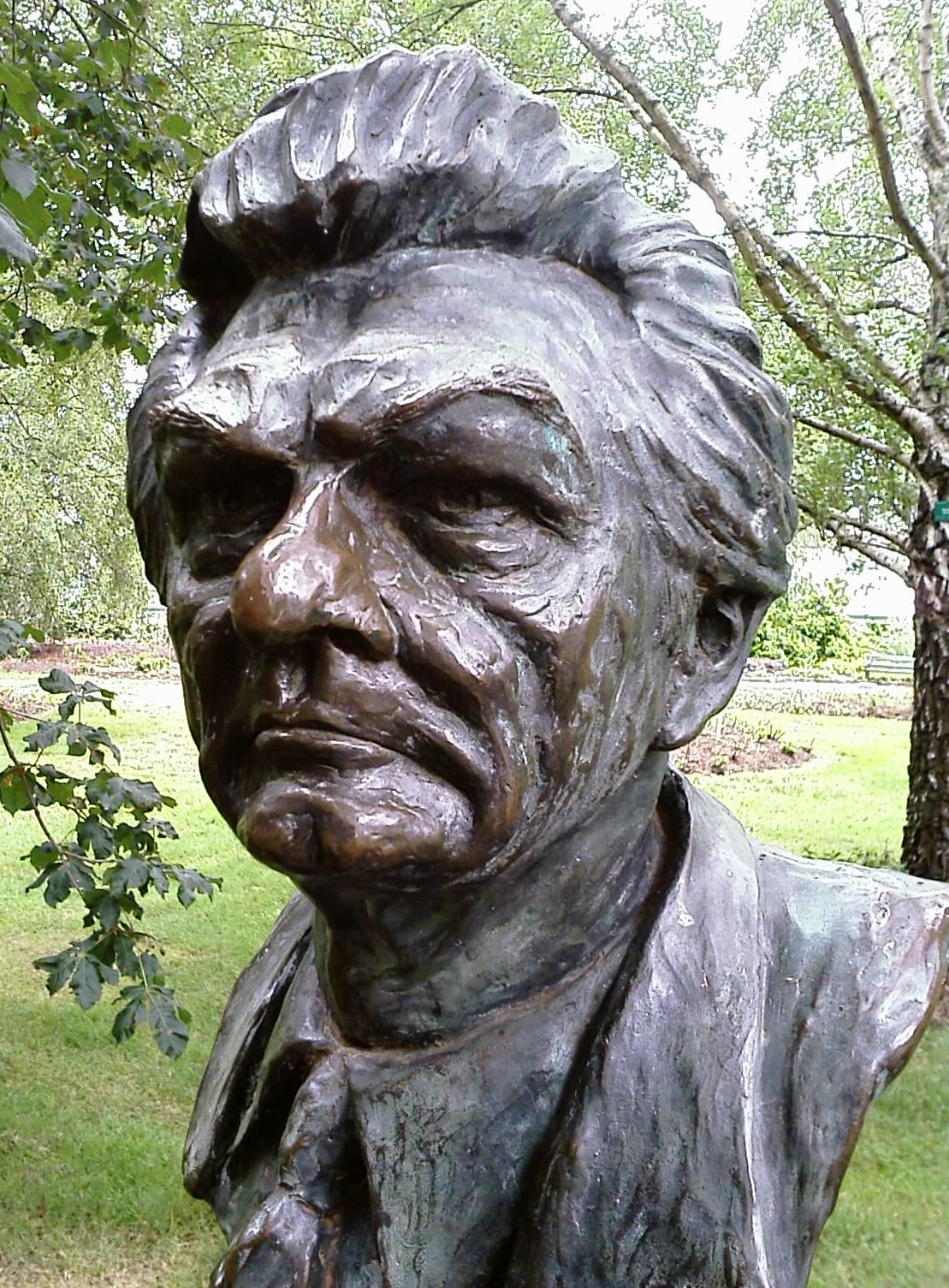
Bob Hawke, 23rd Prime Minister of Australia

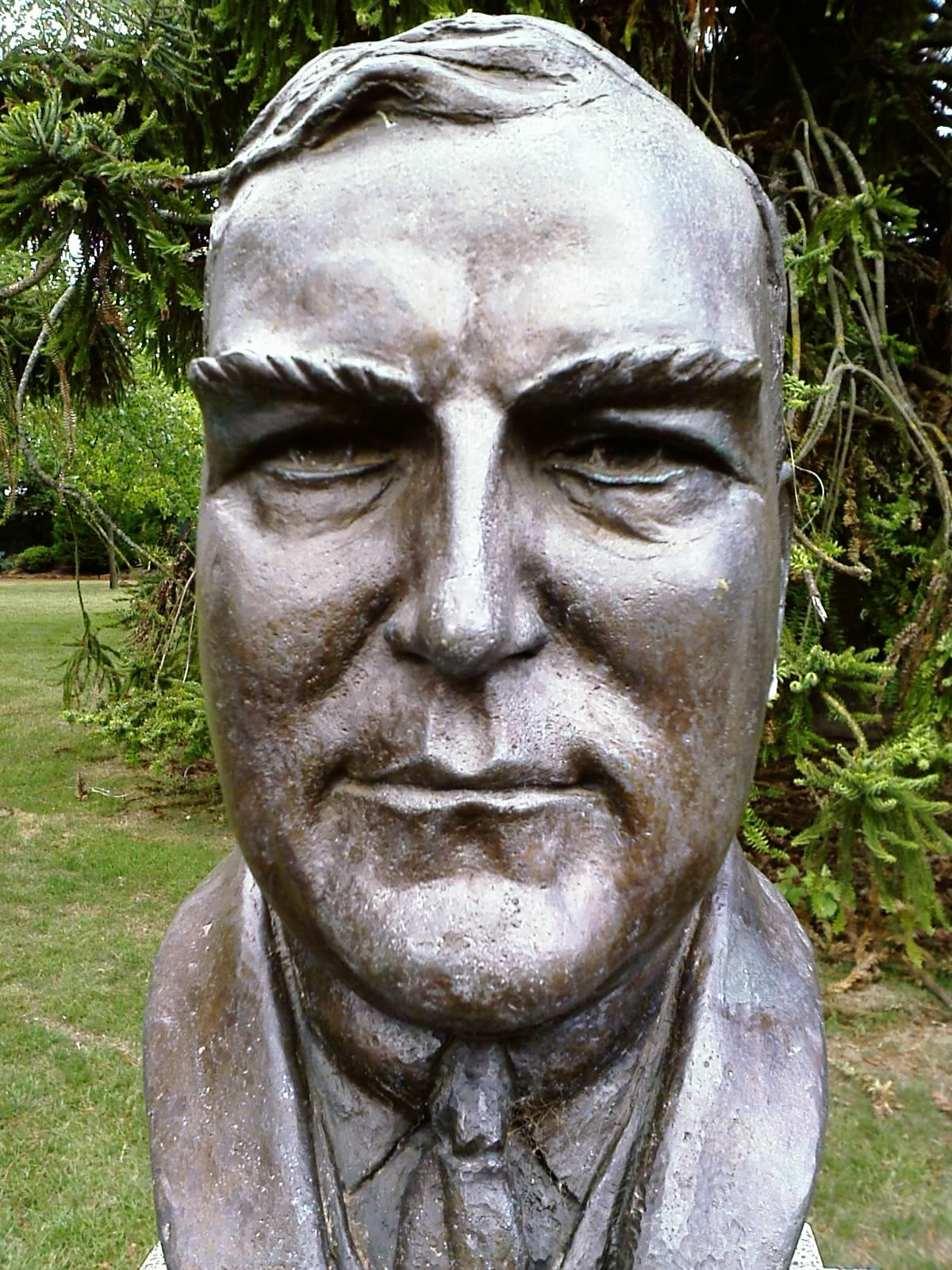
Robert Menzies, 12th Prime Minister of Australia

==== Prime Ministers ====
Three of Australia's prime-ministers and one Acting prime Minister are known to have Cornish ancestry.

- Robert Menzies, Australia's 12th and longest-serving prime minister, 1939–41 and again 1949–1966, was half Cornish. Meeting Cornish author A.L. Rowse in Oxford once, he introduced himself as "a Cornish Sampson on his mother's side." His grandfather was the prominent Cornish trade unionist John Sampson.
- Bob Hawke, 23rd Prime Minister of Australia and longest serving Australian Labor Party Prime Minister. Both of his parents were of Cornish ancestry. Hawke's leadership has been credited with reinvigorating academic interest in the Cornish in Australia.
- Scott Morrison, Australia's prime minister between 2018 and 2022 confirmed he has Cornish ancestors when he visited Bodmin Jail and St Keverne in Cornwall during the G7 2021 to research his family history.

==== Acting Prime Ministers ====
- George Pearce was acting prime minister for seven months in 1916 while Billy Hughes was overseas and remains the only Senator to have fulfilled the role of prime minister without resigning his Senate seat.

==== Premiers ====
Fourteen state premiers are known to have strong Cornish connections. At least six Premiers of South Australia, and four Premiers of Western Australia, have been of Cornish descent or birth.

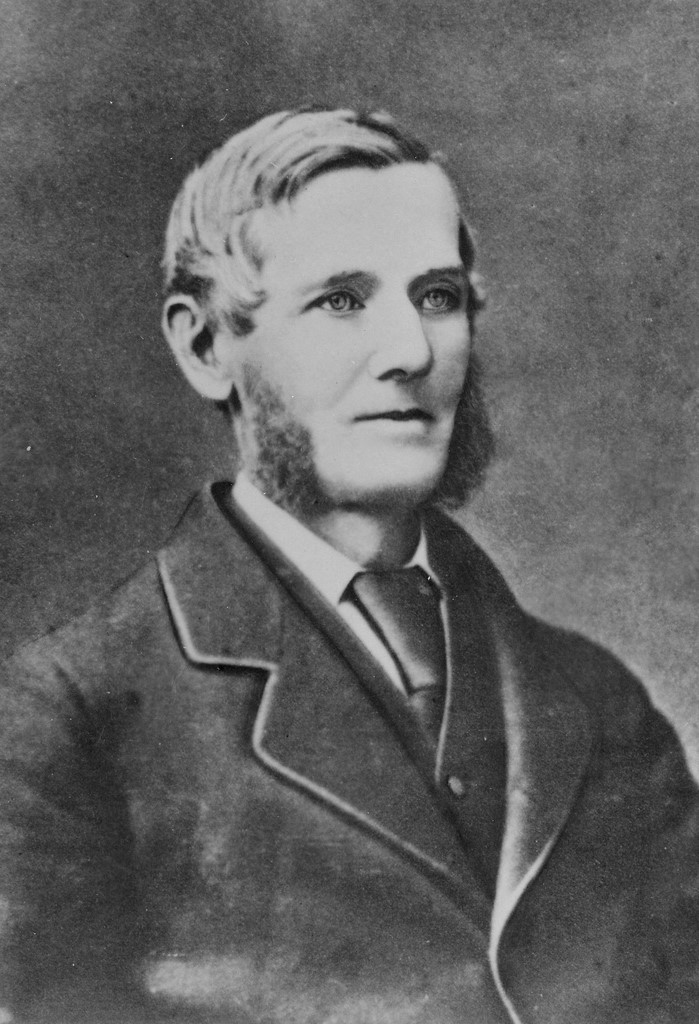
George Waterhouse, 6th Premier of South Australia

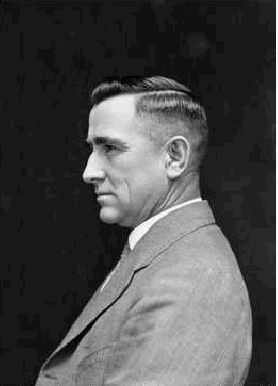
Robert Richards, 32nd Premier of South Australia

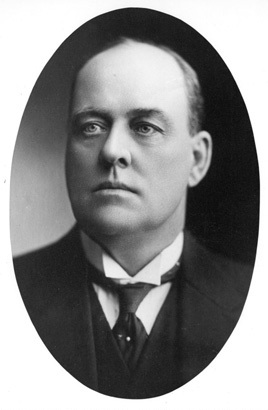
John Scaddan, 10th Premier of Western Australia

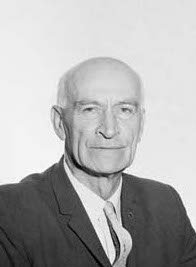
Bert Hawke, 18th Premier of Western Australia

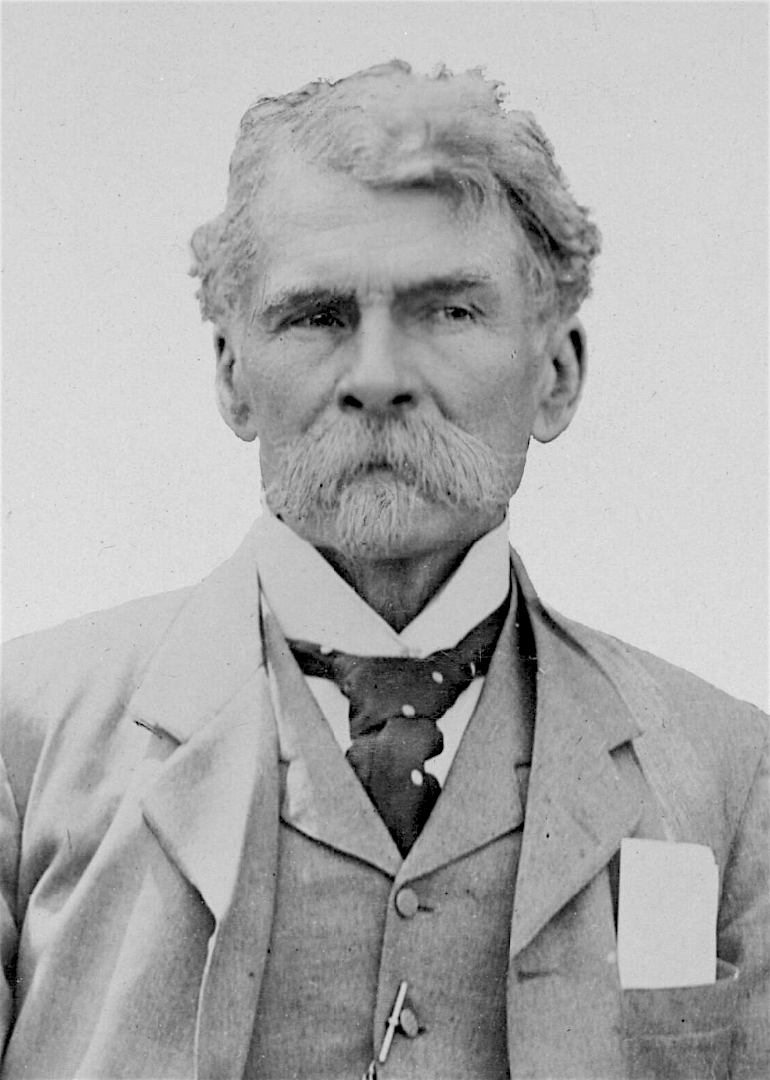
Edward Braddon, 18th Premier of Tasmania

===== South Australia =====
- George Waterhouse – 6th Premier of South Australia, 1861–1863. 7th Premier of New Zealand, 1872–1873. Born in Penzance in 1824.
- James Penn Boucaut – 11th Premier of South Australia. A judge and politician, Boucaut was Premier of South Australia three times: 1866–1867, 1875–1876 and 1877–1878. Born in Mylor in 1831, he emigrated to South Australia with his parents in 1846.
- John Verran – 26th Premier of South Australia, 1910–1912. The 1910 election saw the South Australian division of the Australian Labor Party form a majority government, the first time a party had done so in South Australia. Verran was born at Gwennap in 1856 and when only three months old was taken by his parents to Australia. The family lived at Kapunda, South Australia, until he was eight, and then moved to Moonta where copper had been discovered in 1861.
- Robert Richards – 32nd Premier of South Australia, 1933. Born in Moonta in 1885, the youngest of twelve children to Cornish miner Richard Richards.
- Don Dunstan – 35th Premier of South Australia, 1967–1968 and again 1970–79. Born on 21 September 1926 in Suva, Fiji to Australian parents of Cornish descent. He played a crucial role in Labor's abandonment of the White Australia Policy, securing of Aboriginal rights and encouraging a more multi-cultural Australia. His socially progressive administration saw Aboriginal land rights recognised, homosexuality decriminalised, the first female judge appointed, the first non-British governor, Sir Mark Oliphant, and later, the first indigenous governor Douglas Nicholls.
- David Tonkin – 38th Premier of South Australia, 1979–1982. Born in Adelaide in 1929.

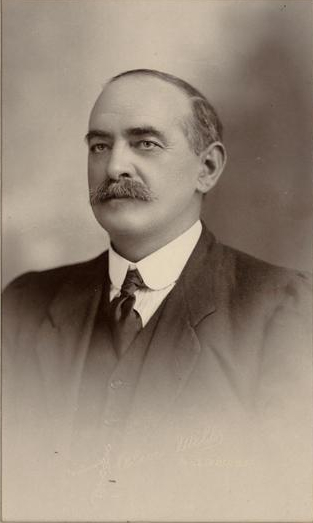
John Earle – 22nd Premier of Tasmania

===== Western Australia =====
- John Scaddan – 10th Premier of Western Australia, 1911–1916. John Scaddan was born in Moonta in 1876, of a Cornish family. He led the first Labor party majority government in Western Australia. The hamlet of Scaddan located along the Esperance branch railway in the Goldfields–Esperance region of Western Australia is named after him.
- Bert Hawke – 18th Premier of Western Australia, 1953–59. Born in 1900 to James Renfrey Hawke and Eliza Ann Blinman Pascoe, both of Cornish descent, in Kapunda, South Australia. He was uncle to Prime Minister Bob Hawke.
- David Brand – 19th and longest serving premier of Western Australia, 1959–1971, grandson of Samuel Mitchell (1838–1912), who was born in Redruth, Cornwall, and established the mining industry in Western Australia, operating the state's first commercial mine, at Geraldine near Northampton. He served in both houses of the Western Australian parliament
- John Trezise Tonkin – 20th Premier of Western Australia, 1971–74. Born in Boulder in 1902. The stage 4 completion of the Beechboro-Gosnells Highway in 1985 saw the highway renamed Tonkin Highway. Tonkin Bridge was also named after him shortly after his death at age 93.

===== Tasmania =====
- Edward Braddon – 18th Premier of Tasmania, 1894–1899. Braddon was born in St. Kew, Cornwall in 1829. He was a member of the First Australian Parliament in the House of Representatives. Braddon was a Tasmanian delegate to the Constitutional Conventions. Both the suburb of Braddon in the Australian Capital Territory and the Division of Braddon in Tasmania are named after him. His sister, Mary Elizabeth Braddon, was later a famous novelist.
- John Earle – 22nd Premier of Tasmania, 1909 and again 1914–1916. Born into a farming family of Cornish descent in Bridgewater, Tasmania in 1865. He became Tasmania's first Labor premier, leading a minority government. He was Vice-President of the Executive Council from 1921 to 1923.

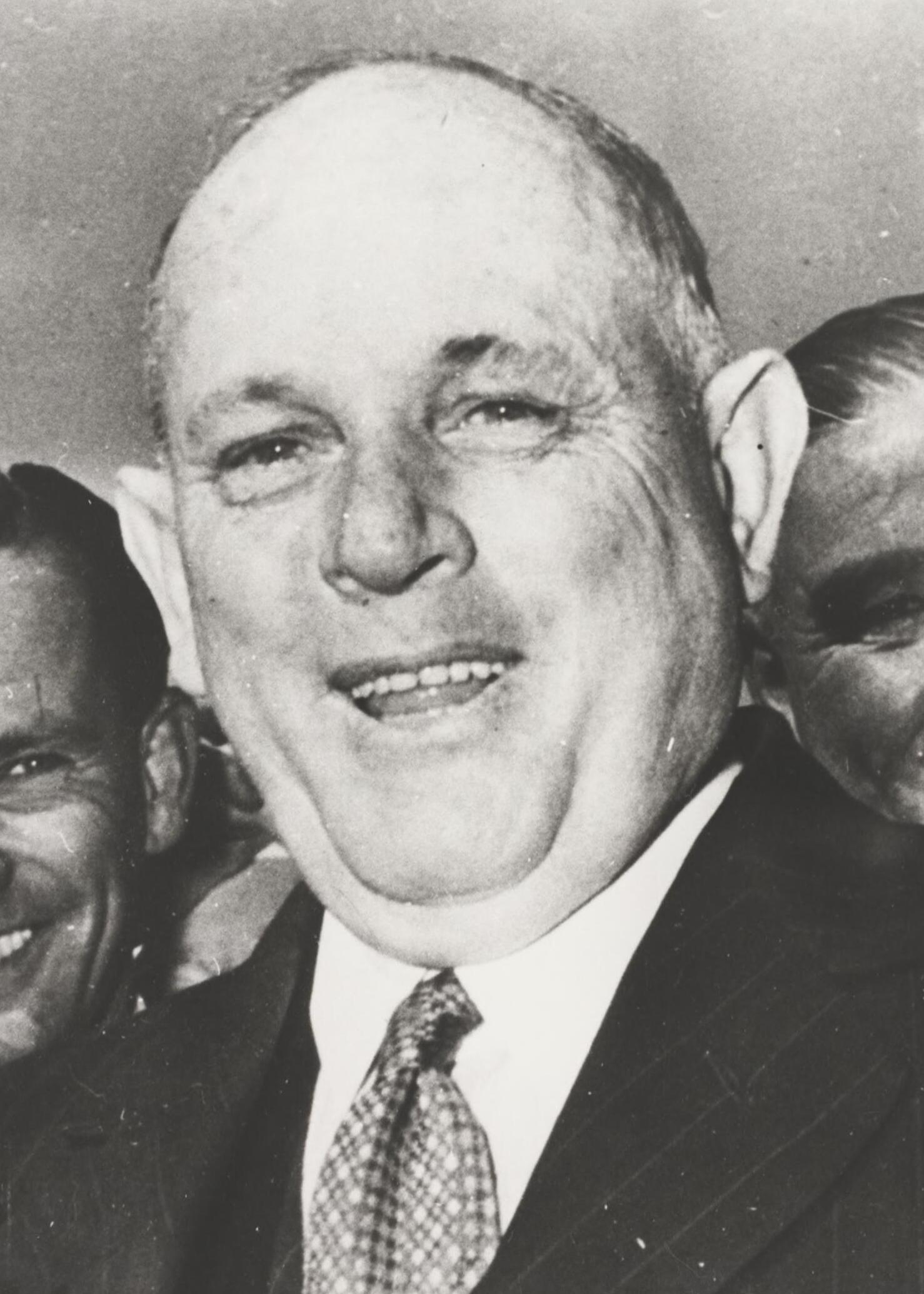
Albert Dunstan, 33rd Premier of Victoria

===== Queensland =====
- Anna Bligh – 37th Premier of Queensland, 2009–2012. Bligh describes herself as a descendant of Cornishman William Bligh. She was the first woman to be appointed Premier of Queensland and, at the 2009 Queensland state election, she became the first woman elected in her own right as a state premier in Australia. In 2009, Bligh was elected for three-year term to the three-person presidential team of the Australian Labor Party.

===== Victoria =====
- Albert Dunstan – 33rd premier of Victoria, 1935–1943 and again 1943–1945. Dunstan was born on 26 July 1882 at Donald East, Victoria, the son of a Cornish gold rush immigrant. He was the second longest-serving premier and the first to hold the position in its own right.

===== Northern Territory =====
- John Langdon Parsons – 5th Government Resident of the Northern Territory, 1884–1890. Member of the South Australian House of Assembly for Encounter Bay, 1878–1881, and North Adelaide 1881. Minister of education, 1881–84. He was the first Minister for the Northern Territory, 1890–93. He was instrumental in the development of railways in the Territory, and he also recognised Aboriginal land rights. Parsons was consul for Japan from 1896 to 1903. Member for the Central district in the Legislative Council, 1901–1903. Born on 28 April 1837 at Botathan near Launceston, Cornwall.

=== Other politicians ===
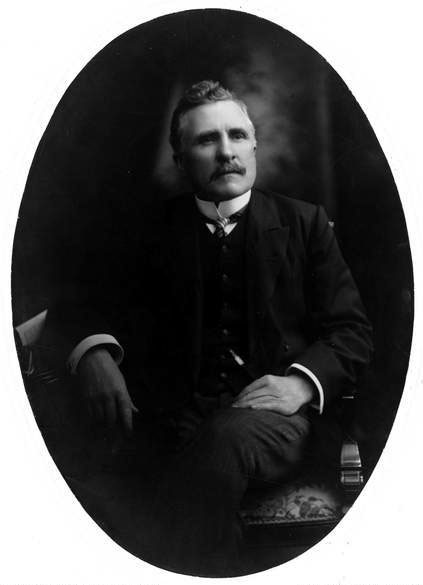
John Quick, Father of the Australian Federation

There have been many other Australian politicians of Cornish birth or descent. Some of these are listed below, starting with perhaps the most important, Sir John Quick, Founding Father of the Australian Federation.

- John Quick – Postmaster-General, 1909–1910. Federal Member of Parliament for Bendigo, 1901–1913. Victorian Legislative Assembly member for Bendigo, 1880–1889. He was a leading delegate to the constitutional conventions of the 1890s, proposing in August 1893 that a formal national convention should be established, with each of the six Australian colonies to be represented by ten elected delegates. The proposal was agreed on, and in November 1893 Quick drafted a bill which formed the basis of the deliberations at the formal convention held in Adelaide in 1897. He was born in Trevassa, Cornwall, in 1852. In 1913 Quick became the founding President of the first Bendigo Cornish Association.
- John Langdon Bonython – editor, newspaper proprietor, philanthropist, and journalist. Member of the First Australian Parliament. Member for South Australia, 1901–1903. Member for Barker, 1903–1906. Editor of the Adelaide daily morning broadsheet, The Advertiser, for 35 years.
- John Lavington Bonython – Mayor of Adelaide, 1911–1913. Lord Mayor of Adelaide, 1927–1930. Son of John Langdon Bonython.
- Herbert Angas Parsons – judge and politician, son of politician John Langdon Parsons. Member of the House of Assembly for Torrens, 1912–15, and for Murray 1918–21. He was briefly attorney-general and minister of education in 1915. Parsons was appointed K.C. in 1916, a judge of the Supreme Court in 1921, he was senior puisne judge in 1927, and acting chief justice in 1935. On occasions Parsons acted as deputy governor and, after his father's death, in 1904 he became consul for Japan. President of the Cornish Association of South Australia, warden of the University of Adelaide's senate, and vice-chancellor from 1942 to 1944. Son in law of John Langdon Bonython.
- Garfield Barwick – Attorney-General of Australia, 1958–64. Minister for External Affairs, 1961–64. Seventh and longest serving Chief Justice of Australia, 1964–81. He was appointed a judge of the International Court of Justice, 1973–74.

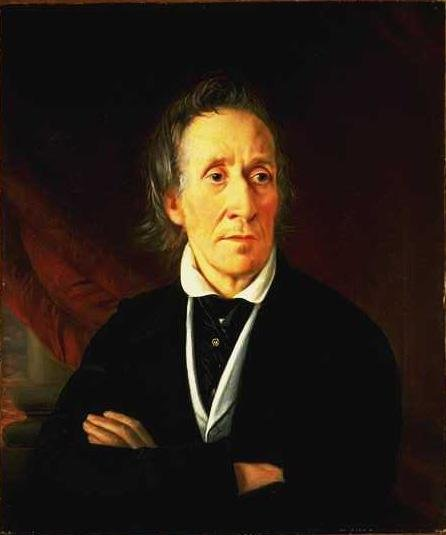
John Pascoe Fawkner, Founder of Melbourne

- John Pascoe Fawkner – Founder of Melbourne. Member of the Victorian Legislative Council. His mother, Hannah Pascoe, was of Cornish parentage.
- John Gale – Father of Canberra. Gale was the founder of the Queanbeyan Age newspaper. He is best remembered for his strong and successful advocacy of Queanbeyan-Canberra as the best site of a future Australian Capital. He was born in Bodmin in 1831.
- Ray Williams – Member for the Electoral district of Hawkesbury in the New South Wales Parliament since 2007.
- George Laffer – Member of the South Australian House of Assembly for Alexandra from 1913 to 1933. He was Speaker from 1927 until 1930.
- John Lutey – Member for the Western Australian Legislative Assembly for Brownhill-Ivanhoe, 1917–1932.
- John Holman – Member for the Western Australian Legislative Assembly for North Murchison, 1901–1904. For the Electoral district of Murchison, 1904–1921. For the Electoral district of Forrest, 1923–1925. His daughter, May, took over the Forrest seat after his death in 1925.

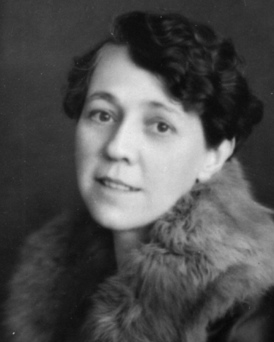
May Holman, Labor's first female parliamentary member

- May Holman – Member for the Western Australian Legislative Assembly for Forrest, 1925–1939. The daughter of John Holman, she was the second woman to be elected to an Australian parliament and the first female Labour parliamentarian. Holman was a delegate to the League of Nations Assembly in 1930. She died in a car crash on the day of her fourth re-election. Her brother took over the seat after her death.
- Richard Buzacott – Member of the Australian Senate for Western Australia, 1910–1923.

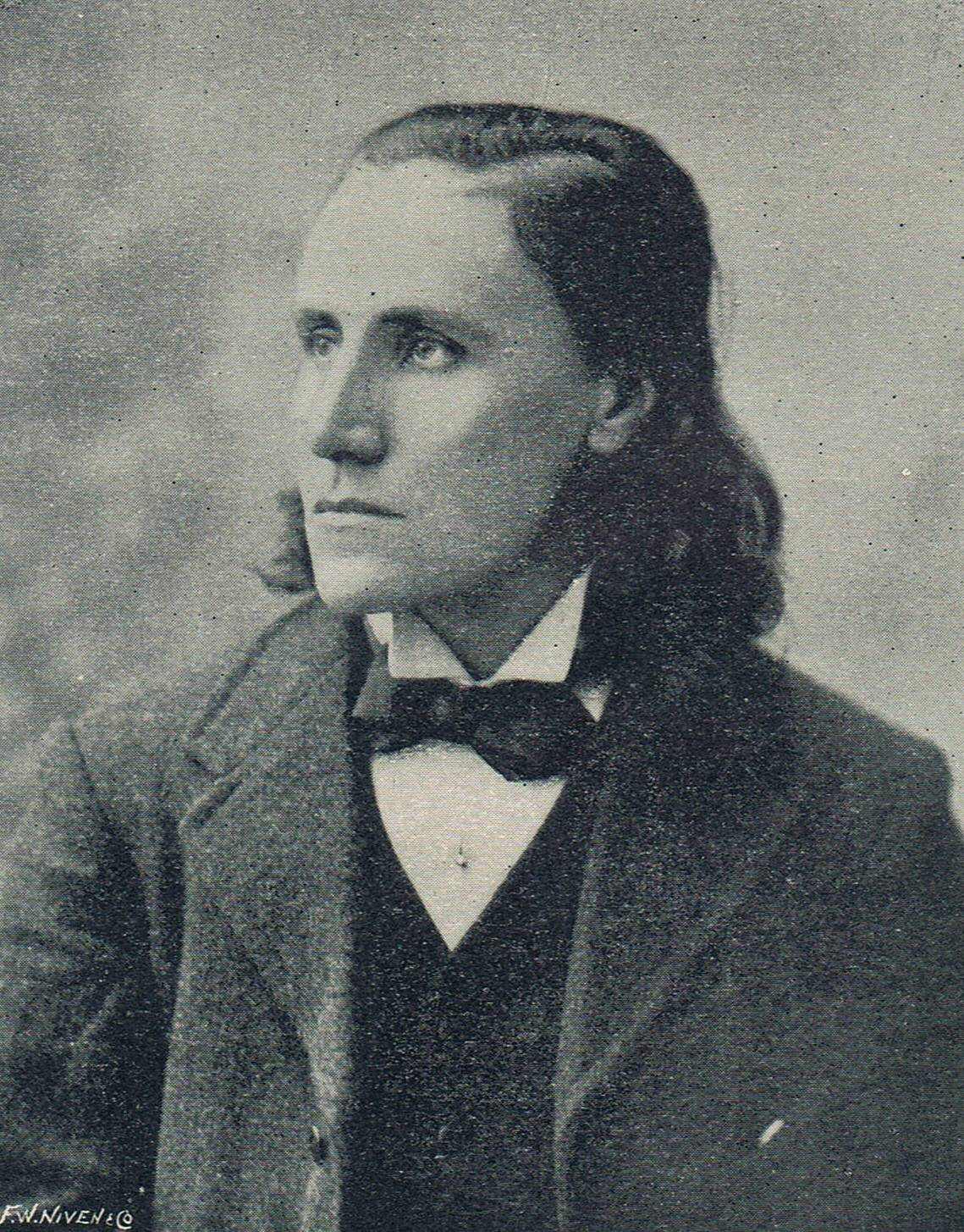
Frederick Vosper, journalist and important figure in the early Australian Labour movement

- Frederick Vosper – Member of the Western Australian Legislative Assembly for North-East Coolgardie, 1897–1900. Newspaper journalist and proprietor, he founded The Sunday Times (Western Australia). Born St. Dominic, Cornwall, in 1869.
- Henry Dangar – Pastoralist, surveyor and explorer of Australia. Member of the New South Wales Legislative Council for Northumberland, 1845–1851. By 1850 he owned or leased over 300,000 acres (121,406 ha). Born St Neot, Cornwall, in 1796.
- Mark Goldsworthy – Member of the South Australian House of Assembly for Kavel since 2002.
- Ian Trezise – Member of the Victorian Legislative Council for Geelong, 1999– . Son of Neil Trezise.
- Baden Teague – Senator for South Australia 1977–1996.
- Brice Mutton – Member of the Parliament of New South Wales for Concord, 1949. Born Lerryn, Cornwall, in 1890.
- Tom Uren – Member of the Parliament of Australia for Reid, 1958–1990. Various Ministerial roles during the 1970s and 80s. Father of the House of Representatives, 1984–1990. Deputy Leader of the Australian Labor Party, 1975–1977.
- Nick Champion – Member of the Australian House of Representatives for Wakefield from 2007 until 2019, then member for Spence.
- Robert Brokenshire – Member of the South Australian Parliament for Mawson, 1993–2006. Member of the South Australian Legislative Council for the Family First Party since 2008.
- Neil Trezise – Player and captain for Geelong Football Club. Member of the Victorian Legislative Council for Geelong West, 1964–1967, and again for Geelong North, 1967–1992.
- Bob Chynoweth – Member of the Australian Parliament for Flinders, 1983–1984. Member of the Australian Parliament for Dunkley, 1984–1990, and again 1993–96.

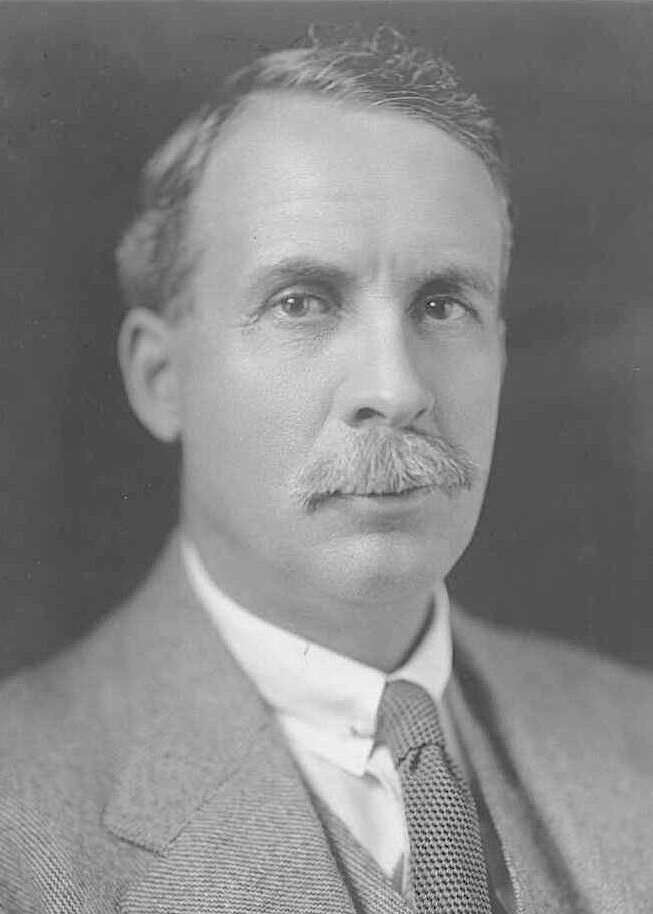
George Pearce, instrumental in founding the Australian Labor Party in Western Australia.

- George Pearce – Senator for Western Australia, 1901–1938. Instrumental in founding the Australian Labor Party in Western Australia. Minister for Defence, 1908–1909, 1910–1913, 1914–1921 and again in 1932–1934. Vice-President of the Executive Council, 1926–1929. Various other Ministerial roles during the 1920s and 1930s. Deputy Leader of the Australian Labor Party, 1915–1916. Leader of the Australian Labor Party in the Senate, 1914–1916. Leader of the National Labor Party in the Senate, 1916–1917. Leader of the Nationalist Party in the Senate, 1917–1931. Leader of the United Australia Party in the Senate, 1931–1937.
- Josiah Thomas – Member of the Australian Parliament for Barrier, 1901–1917. Senator for New South Wales, 1917–1923 and again 1925–1929. Postmaster-General, 1908–1909 and again 1910–1911. Born in Camborne, in 1863.
- David Charleston – Member of the South Australian Legislative Council, 1891–1901. Senator for South Australia, 1901–1903. President of the Adelaide Trades and Labour Council.
- Harry Kneebone – born to Cornish parents, was an Australian politician. In 1931, he was appointed to the Australian Senate as a Labor Senator for South Australia.
- Richard Orchard – Member of the Australian Parliament for Nepean, 1913–1919. Born in 1871, to Cornish parents, John Henry Orchard, a blacksmith, and his wife Alicia, née Thomas, he died in 1942.
- William Higgs – Senator for Queensland, 1901–1906. Member of the Australian Parliament for Capricornia, 1910–1922. He was Treasurer of Australia 1915–1916. Born in 1862, the son of a Cornish storekeeper, William Guy Higgs, he died in 1951.
- Jabez Dodd – founder of the Australian Miners Association. A Minister for five years during the Scaddan Government; and a member of the Legislative Council for 18 years. During his period on the Legislative Council, he drafted legislation designed to improve the working conditions of the miners.

== Immigration history ==
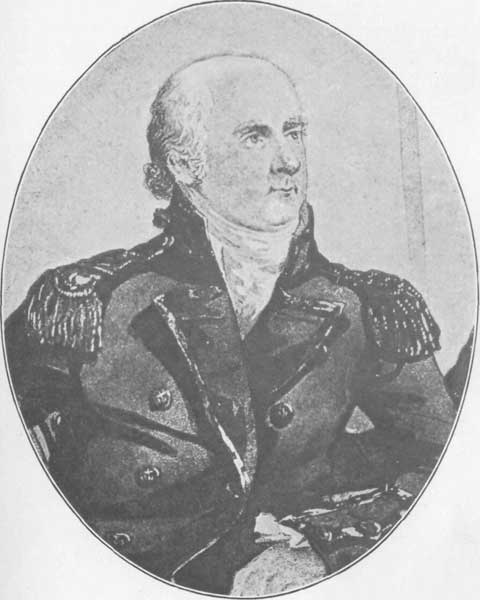
Philip Gidley King, 3rd Governor of NSW

=== Early settlers ===
During the 18th century many Cornishmen were employed by the Royal Navy. People like Admiral Edward Boscawen and Edward Pellew, conscious of their Cornish identity, recruited heavily from their fellow Cornishmen. Samuel Wallis, from Lanteglos-by-Camelford, was one of Boscawen's protégés and the first European to discover Easter Island and Tahiti in 1767. Cornish naval officers played a major role in the early years of the Australian colony.

- Zachary Hicks – When Captain Cook arrived in Tahiti in June 1769, to observe the transit of Venus, his second-in-command was the Cornishman Lieutenant Zachary Hicks. After six months charting the coast of New Zealand, Cook headed west in search of New Holland as Australia was then known. It was at first light on 19 April 1770 that Hicks spotted land ahead, so it is that the most south-eastern tip of Australia is called Point Hicks. Cook hugged the coast until they arrived at Botany Bay, where again Hicks came to the forefront. Rowing ashore in two jolly boats, he was the first of the party to set foot on Australian soil.

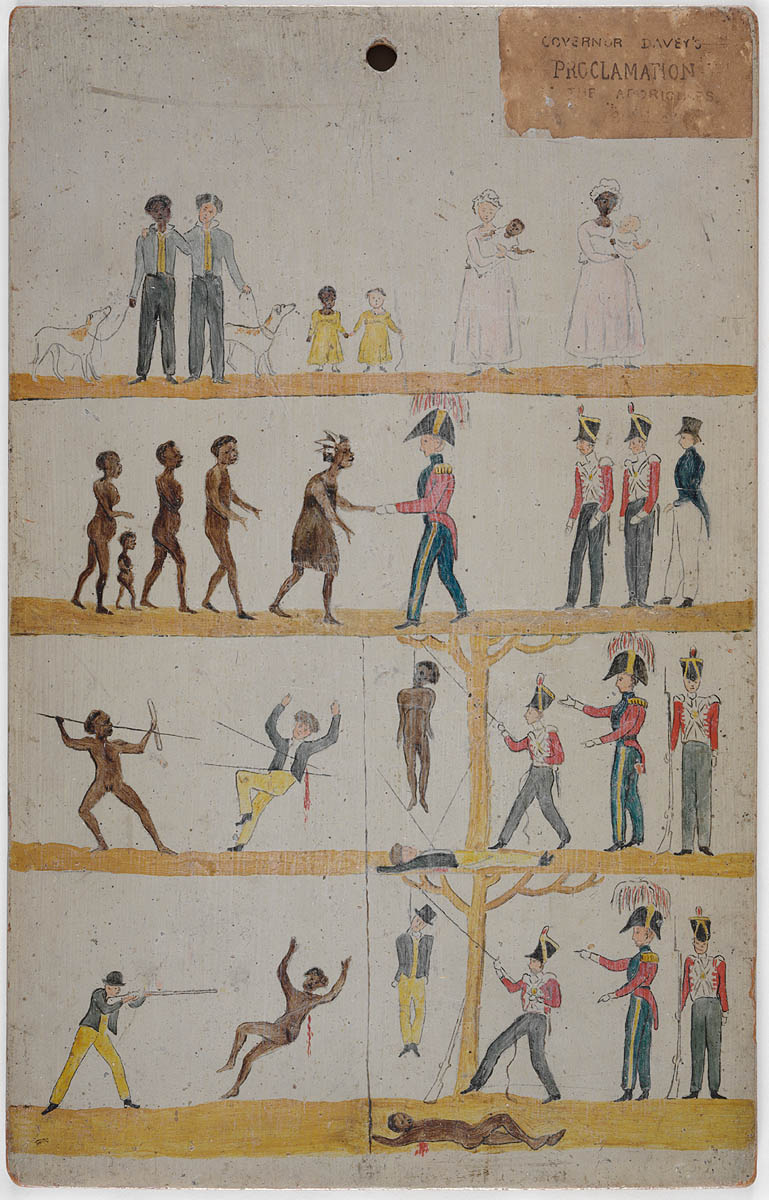
Governor Arthur's proclamation c. 1828–1830, the Arthur family were Cornish

==== Governors ====
After its founding in 1788 two of the first governors of the New South Wales colony were Cornish.

Philip Gidley King – 3rd Governor, who arrived on the First Fleet as First Lieutenant in Captain Phillips' ship. One of those who went ashore to look for water, he had his first encounter with the Aborigines, offering them beads and mirrors. Botany Bay proving a disappointment, King recommended the location at Port Jackson as an alternative. Ralph Clark, an officer of Marines, compared the new location with the River Tamar in Cornwall, 'I cannot compare any think to come nearer to it than about 3 miles above Saltash on the Wair.' King and 22 others were sent to colonize Norfolk Island. This eventually came to nothing and the island was abandoned in 1806. After a traumatic time on the island King went back to Britain to recuperate, leaving Nicholas Nepean, from Saltash, in charge. He returned in November 1791 and in 1800 he became governor of New South Wales. In 1803 he ordered the occupation of Van Diemen's Land as a convict settlement, there he founded Launceston named after the town of his birth.

William Bligh – 4th Governor, most famous as the victim of the Mutiny on the Bounty, he was also unfortunate enough to be the victim of a coup d'etat at the hands of the infamous Rum Corps on 26 January 1808. He had tried to rein them in, something King had failed to do, but instead spent the next two years in exile on Van Diemen's Land while the colony was ruled by a military junta. He returned in 1810 when Lachlan Macquarie was appointed as governor. Shortly afterwards he left Australia for good.

Sir George Arthur – Lieutenant Governor of Van Diemen's Land, now the State of Tasmania, 1823–1837. At the time Van Diemen's Land was the main British penal colony and it was separated from New South Wales in 1825. It was during Arthur's time in office that Van Diemen's Land gained much of its notorious reputation as a harsh penal colony. He selected Port Arthur as the ideal location for a prison settlement, on a peninsula connected by a narrow, easily guarded isthmus, surrounded by shark-infested seas. He failed in his attempts to reform the colony and the system of penal transportation with Arthur's autocratic and authoritarian rule leading to his recall. By this time he was one of the wealthiest men in the colony. He returned to Britain in 1837.

==== Convicts ====
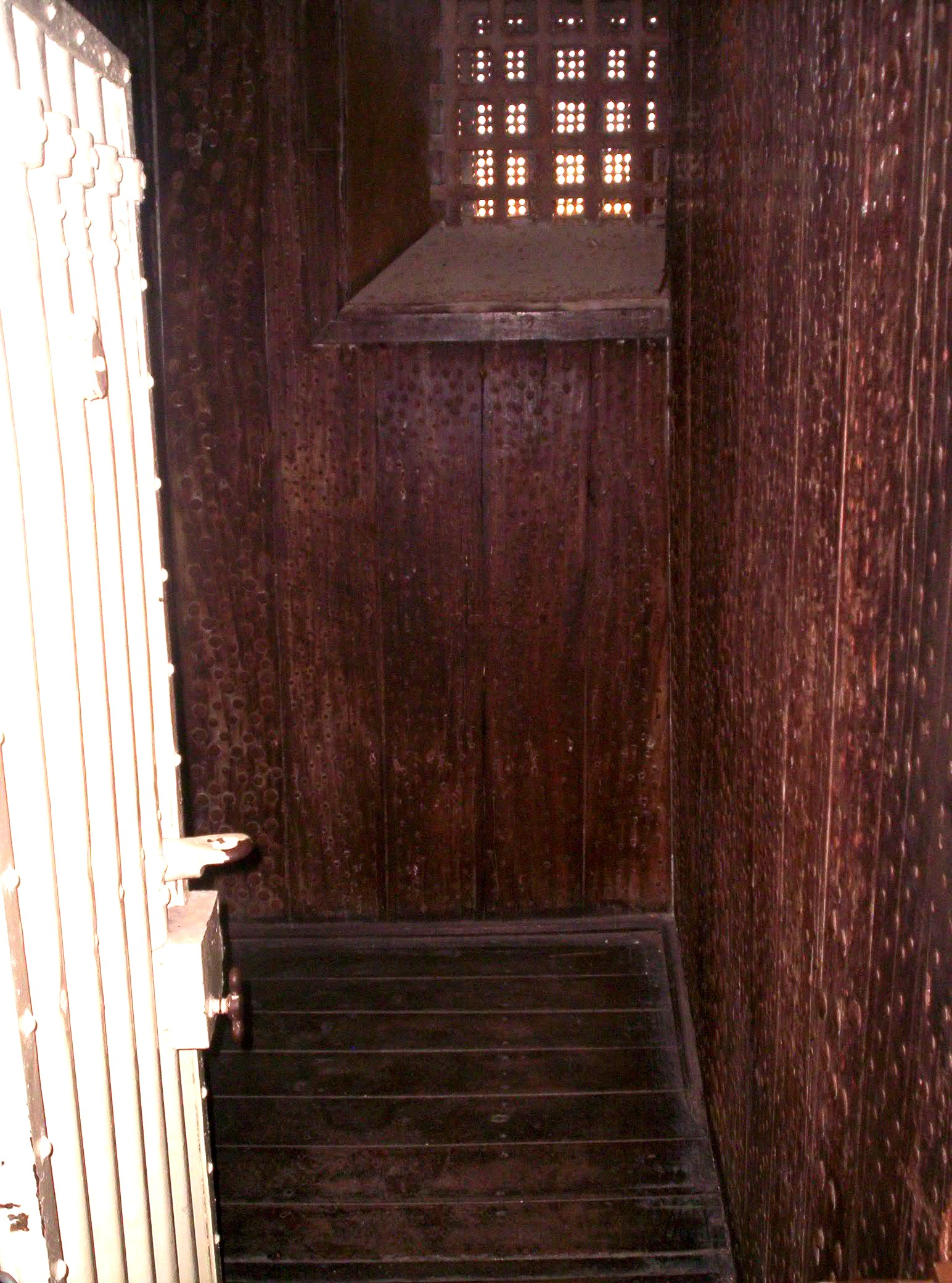
Moondyne Joe's "escape-proof" cell

On the First Fleet 21 Cornish convicts arrived in Australia aboard the Charlotte and Scarborough in 1788. A further twelve were sent in the Second Fleet of 1790, though six died on the way, and sixteen were carried on the Third Fleet of 1791. Some 600 convicts were transported from Cornwall to Australia between 1787 and 1852, 78 per cent of whom were male. Some of the most famous of these included:

- James Ruse, known as Australia's first farmer, who had been transported from Cornwall in the First Fleet. Ruse, New South Wales was named after him. As well as being the first to set foot on the colony, he was also given the first land grant.
- Mary Bryant, the famous female convict and escapee, transported on the First Fleet. With her husband and children she became one of the first to successfully escape the colony, though her family all perished along the way.
- William Bryant, a fisherman, husband of Mary, also transported on the First Fleet. As a fisherman he was considered useful, and put in charge of looking after the fishing ships.
- William Philp, from Padstow in Cornwall, was transported on board the Argyle in 1831 with a life sentence. In 1833 he escaped by stealing the government schooner Badger with several other convicts. They sailed to Manila and then made their way to Macao. In Macao they were identified by a Royal Navy officer who requested their arrest. However the Portuguese authorities refused to arrest or deport them and they made their escape. They were never recaptured.
- Moondyne Joe, whose real name was Joseph Bolitho Johns (c. 1826 – 13 August 1900), was Western Australia's best known bushranger. He was convicted of burglary and stealing in 1849 and sentenced to ten years penal servitude. After being moved between several prisons he was transported to Western Australia. Due to his good behaviour he was released on a ticket of leave in 1864. In 1865 he was sentenced to a further ten years for Killing and eating a neighbour's steer, something he denied for the rest of his life. Determined not to serve his sentence he absconded from a work party. He was eventually caught but months later he escaped again. Trying to make his way to South Australia, Johns was again caught. This time he was placed in a specially built "escape-proof" cell in Fremantle Prison. Two years later he escaped through a hole he'd made in the prison wall. Keeping quiet and not committing any crimes, Johns managed to evade the law for two more years, but accidentally ran into police while making a robbery in 1869. Moondyne Joe was given a ticket of leave in April 1871.

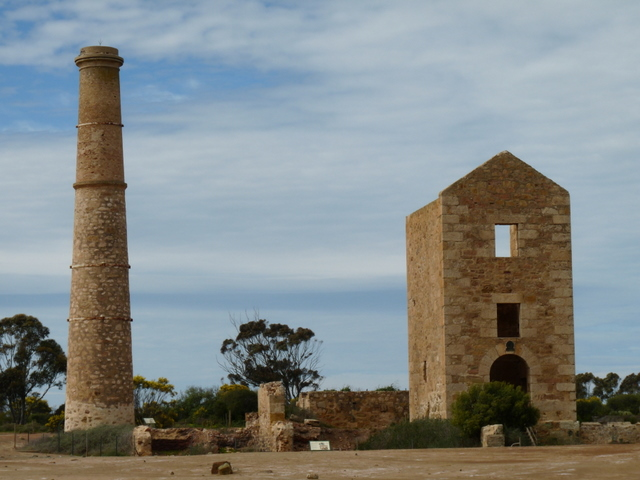
Historic copper mines at Moonta

=== Mining ===
The greatest waves of Cornish immigrants to Australia came to mine various minerals including copper, silver and gold. Some of the greatest areas of Cornish settlement are listed below. During the late 18th and early 19th centuries over a third of the Cornish workforce was employed in the mining industry. A mixture of famine and collapses in the mining industry in their native Cornwall forced many thousands of Cornish people to leave their homes from the 1840s. However their skills in hard-rock and metalliferous mining were so sought after that tens of thousands more were sent for over the following decades to build the growing Australian mining industry. This was added to during the gold-rushes, when even more Cornish arrived to seek their fortune.

==== South Australia ====
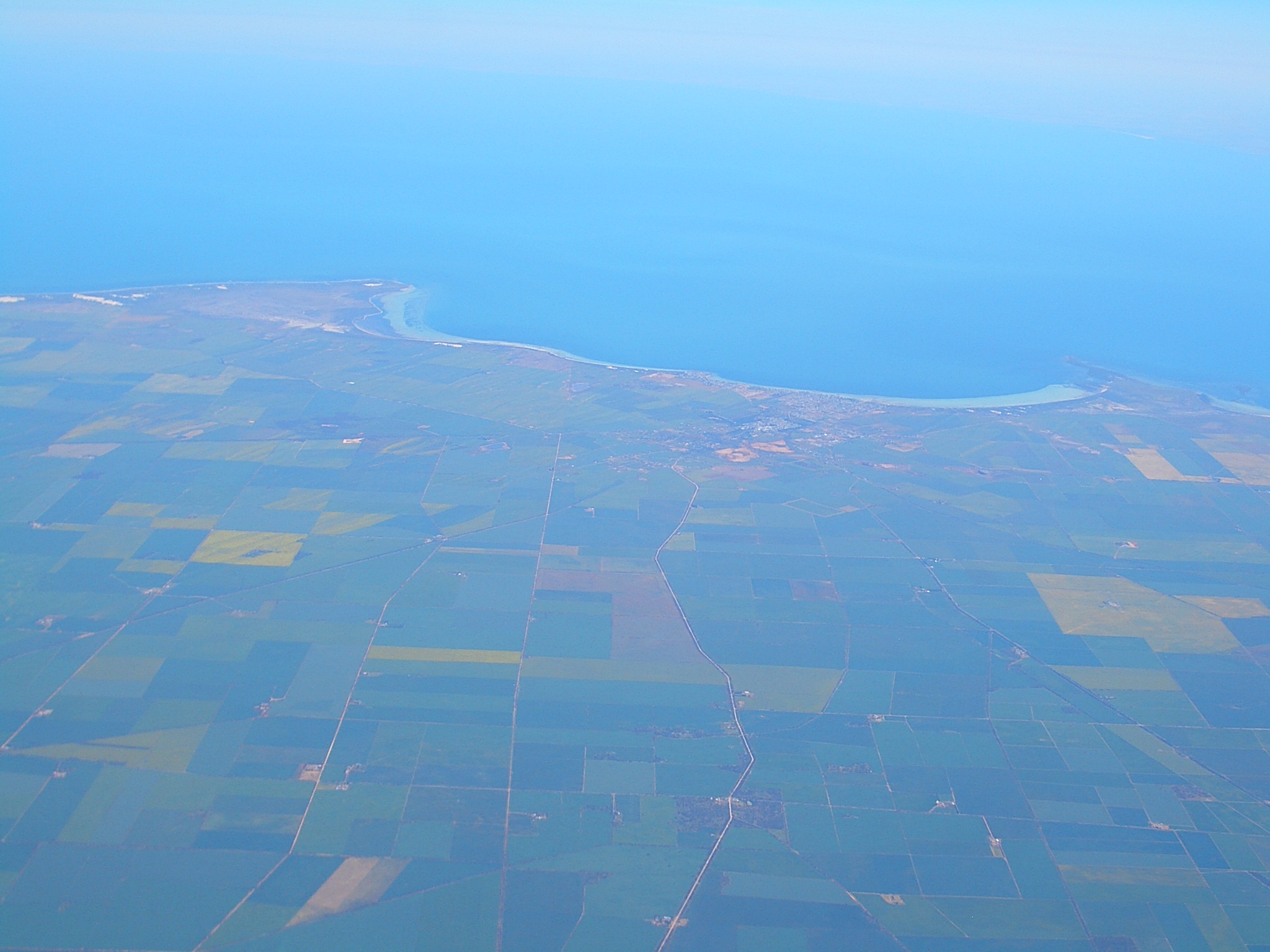
An aerial view of the "Copper Triangle"

Samuel Stephens became the first adult colonist to put foot on South Australian soil when he landed at Nepean Bay on 27 July 1836. He was followed by hundreds of other Cornish people over the following five years. His brother, John Stephens, was active in promoting the new colony within Britain, publishing his book, The Land of Promise, in 1839.

Ten percent of the South Australian population has significant Cornish ancestry. Cornish surnames are more heavily concentrated in South Australia where six of the top ten surnames are Cornish.

Internationally renowned Cornish author D. M. Thomas, who spent part of his childhood in Melbourne, visited the town of Truro, South Australia in the late 20th century. There, he found that, "Cornwall seemed close ... Cornish miners had come in droves in the last century, and played a large part in founding the state. A High School class to which I read and talked had three children with solidly Cornish names, who knew all about their ancestry."

In its heyday Moonta was South Australia's second largest town after Adelaide and was predominantly settled by Cornish miners and their families. Today it is known as 'Australia's Little Cornwall'. Along with the other principal towns of Kadina and Wallaroo in the northern Yorke Peninsula this mining area became known as the Copper Triangle and was a significant source of prosperity for South Australia in the late 19th and early 20th centuries. Today Moonta is most famous for its traditional Cornish pasties and its Cornish style miner's cottages and mine engine houses such as Richman's and Hughes engines houses built in the 1860s. Many streets and houses have Cornish names. Many descendants of these Cornish families bearing their Cornish surnames still live in the Copper Triangle and the area is intensely proud of its Cornish heritage. Many of the original miners cottages made from wattle and daub still stand and are still lived in by local residents. Many Cornish subsequently left the area during the Victorian and Western Australian gold-rushes.

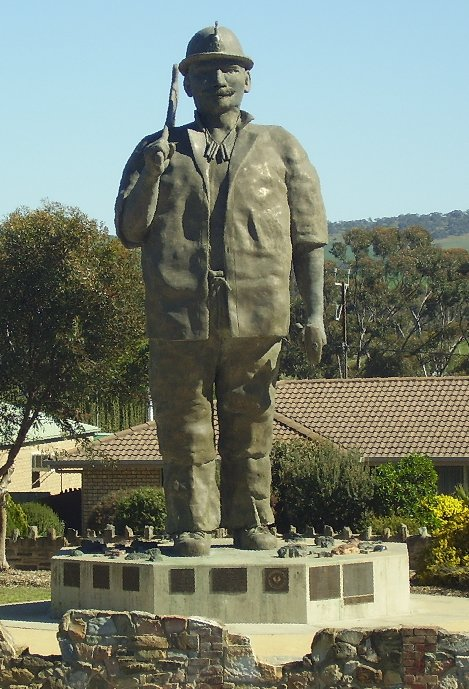
Map Kernow ("the son of Cornwall"), Kapunda, South Australia

Copper was discovered in Kapunda in the 1840s, coinciding with the Cornish potato famine which led to many Cornish people emigrating to the town.

Copper was discovered at Montacute, in the Adelaide Hills, soon after Kapunda, and Cornish miners were in the forefront of this development.

The Burra mine, or 'the Monster' as it was colloquially known, acted like a magnet to the Cornish in Australia. Discovered in 1845, it proved to be an incredibly rich mine, sparking a new wave of immigration to South Australia. The main township is called Redruth after Redruth in Cornwall. Henry Roach was a miner from Cornwall who was Captain of the Burra copper mine for many years. In this position he almost always employed Cornishmen as his assistants, and most of the miners were also immigrants from Cornwall.

==== Victoria ====
The Cornish played an important role in the development of the Victorian goldfields.

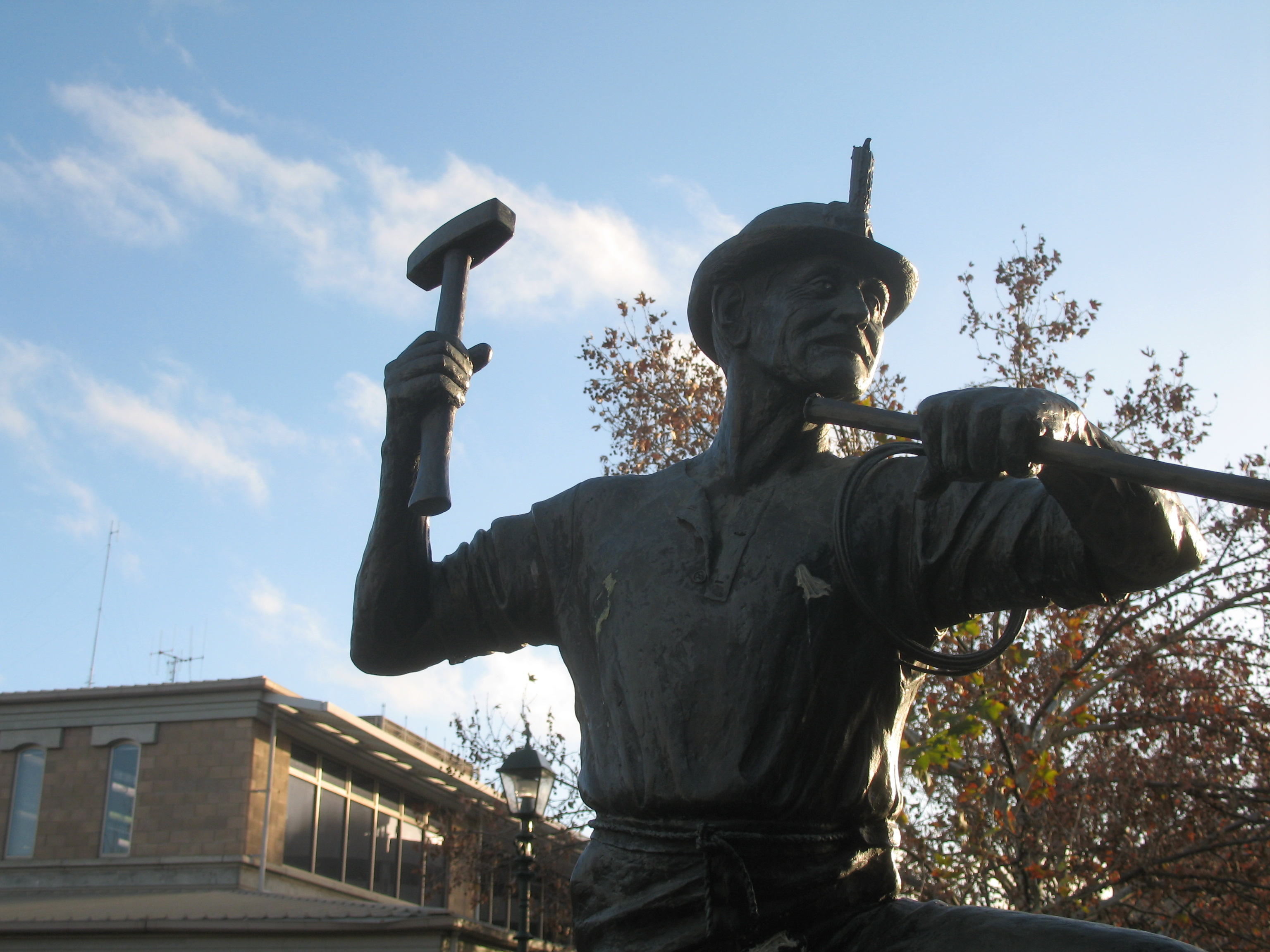
A statue commemorating Cornish miners in Bendigo, Victoria, Australia

In 1881 46.9 percent of fathers and 41.4 percent of mothers in Bendigo were born in Cornwall. This was in addition to those Cornish who were born in Australia or places as far afield as Mexico or Brazil. The Cornish in Bendigo outnumbered the combined strength of their Irish and Scottish counterparts.

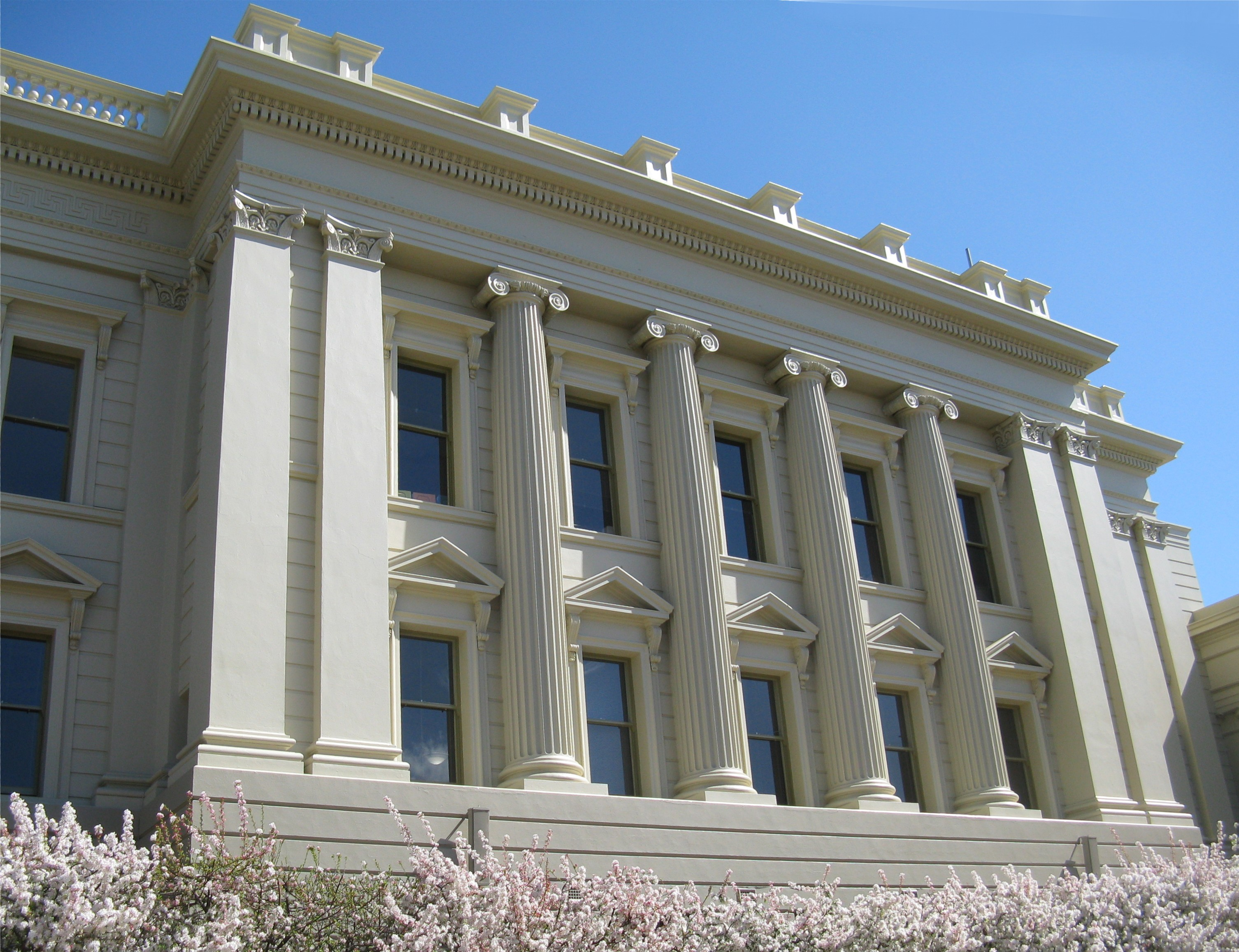
The City Hall, Geelong, Victoria, designed by Cornish architect Joseph Reed

Along with Bendigo, Ballarat was one of the major Cornish mining settlements in Victoria. Many Cornish settled in Geelong, especially after the decline of the gold-fields.

==== New South Wales ====
Many Moonta and Bendigo Cornish took up mining in Broken Hill. The Cornish presence in Broken Hill was bolstered by Cornish American miners from Nevada, who brought with them better technology for working in the silver-lead sulphide deposits.

==== Western Australia ====
There were Cornish mining copper in Western Australia from the 1840s, but this was increased with the discovery of gold.

Once the third largest town in Western Australia, Coolgardie attracted the Cornish during the 1890s to mine gold.

The city of Kalgoorlie with Boulder attracted great numbers of Cornish both from within and outside Australia, due to their extensive goldfields.

Cornish miners worked at the Geraldine mine in Western Australia and the nearby town of Northampton. Their produce was shipped out of Port Gregory, Western Australia in small vessels like the tramp steamer SS Xantho and then transshipped to the port of Geraldton where it was loaded onto wool ships bound for England as a form of 'paying ballast'.

== Cornish associations ==
There are many Cornish associations in Australia, as there are around the world. The Cornish Association of South Australia is the oldest, being run continuously since 1890. Others include The Cornish Association of Bendigo and District, The Cornish Association of New South Wales, Southern Sons of Cornwall inc., The Cornish Association of Queensland, The Cornish Association of North Yorke Peninsula, The Cornish Association of Tasmania, The Cornish Association of Victoria, and The Cornish Association of Western Australia.

== Names ==
There are many names of businesses and places in Australia that are named after Cornish people and places.

=== Businesses ===
- Leggo's – producers of Italian-style foods. Named after founder Henry Madren Leggo, whose parents came from Cornwall.
- Fletcher Jones – Australia wide clothing manufacturer and retailer, founded by Fletcher Jones the son of a Cornish miner from Bendigo.
- Michell Group. Comprising Michell Wool, one of the largest wool processing companies in the world. Michell Machinery, distributors of agricultural machinery and equipment. Founded by George Henry Michell, born in Phillack, Cornwall in 1839.
- Cornwall Coal Company – founded in 1886 to establish coal mines in Tasmania's Fingal Valley, where it continues to operate as a wholly owned subsidiary of Cement Australia.

=== Places ===
==== Named after Cornish places ====
- Callington, South Australia
- Carclew, North Adelaide: Landmark mansion and youth arts centre on Montefiore Hill named by John Langdon Bonython after his ancestral village
- Cornwall, Tasmania
- Cornwall, Queensland
- Devonport, Tasmania
- Eddystone, Tasmania
- Edgecumbe Bay, Queensland
- Edgcumbe Beach, Tasmania
- Exeter, Tasmania
- Falmouth, Tasmania
- Frogmore, New South Wales
- Launceston, Tasmania, named by Governor King after his hometown of Launceston, Cornwall.
- Newlyn, Victoria
- St Neot Avenue, Potts Point, Sydney named by Jeremiah Rundle after his hometown of St Neot, Cornwall
- Padstow, New South Wales
- Penrice, South Australia
- Redruth, township and jail within Burra, South Australia
- Tamar River, Tasmania.
- Tresco, Victoria: named after Tresco, Isles of Scilly.
- Truro, South Australia

==== Named after Cornish people ====
- Point Hicks, named after Zachary Hickes, the first to see the mainland of Australia on Cook's voyage in the Endeavour in 1768.
- Point Piper, named after Captain John Piper.
- Knuckey Lagoon, Northern Territory, named by Surveyor General George Goyder after his Senior Surveyor Richard Randall Knuckey.

Places named after Evan Nepean, a Cornish politician in the late eighteenth century. The name "Nepean" is thought to come from Nanpean ("the head of the valley"), in Cornish:

- Nepean River in New South Wales, Australia
- Nepean Highway southeast of Melbourne, Australia
- Point Nepean, an outer suburb of Melbourne at the end of the highway
- Electoral district of Nepean, an electoral district in Victoria, Australia
- Nepean Island (Norfolk Island), Southwest Pacific
- Nepean Island, Queensland, one of the Torres Strait islands
- Nepean Bay where the South Australia Company came to Kingscote, Kangaroo Island, South Australia

Places named after Henry Dangar:

- Mount Dangar
- Dangarfield
- Dangar Falls
- Dangarsleigh
- Dangar Island

== See also ==
- Cornish Americans
- Cornish diaspora
- Cornish people
- European Australians
- Europeans in Oceania
- Immigration to Australia
- Notable Australian Cornish wrestlers

== Bibliography ==
- Payton, Philip, Making Moonta: The Invention of Australia's Little Cornwall, University of Exeter Press; 2007, ISBN 978-0859897952
