= Dennis Jones (Australian politician) =

Australian trade unionist and politician

Denny Jones

Member of the Legislative Assembly of Western Australia
- In office 10 March – 20 June 1910
- Preceded by: Peter O'Loghlen
- Succeeded by: Peter O'Loghlen
- Constituency: Forrest

Personal details
- Born: 27 January 1874 Woodend, Victoria, Australia
- Died: 19 January 1936 (aged 61) Greenbushes, Western Australia, Australia
- Party: Labor

Dennis Jones (27 January 1874 – 19 January 1936) was an Australian trade unionist and politician. He was a member of the Legislative Assembly of Western Australia from March to June 1910, in unusual circumstances, and ran for parliament unsuccessfully on two more occasions in the 1920s.

Jones was born in Woodend, Victoria, to Catherine (née Greelish) and Patrick Jones. He moved to Western Australia in the 1890s, and worked as a general labourer and teamster at various locations in the state's South West. Jones eventually became state president of the Amalgamated Timber Workers' Union, and was involved in a number of industrial disputes in that capacity. In May 1907, he and two others (one of whom was MP John Holman) were convicted of illegally aiding a strike, and issued heavy fines. Jones first attempted to enter parliament at the 1908 state election, winning Labor preselection for the seat of Sussex. However, he withdrew prior to the election to concentrate on his work with the union, and was replaced by William Thomas (who was defeated).

In March 1910, Peter O'Loghlen, the Labor member for the seat of Forrest, resigned from parliament to contest the 1910 federal election. Jones was selected as O'Loghlen's replacement, and won the resulting by-election unopposed. However, O'Loghlen's bid for federal parliament was unsuccessful, and Jones resigned from parliament in June 1910 to allow him to resume his seat, after just over three months in office. Jones did not make another run for parliament until 1923, when he unsuccessfully contested the by-election occasioned by O'Loghlen's death. He was one of three candidates, all of whom were endorsed by the Labor Party. He also ran in the seat of Nelson at the 1927 state election, but lost to Jack Smith of the Nationalist Party. Jones moved to Greenbushes in 1928, where he lived until his death in 1936 (aged 61). He had married Alice Dowell in 1914, with whom he had two daughters.

Parliament of Western Australia
Preceded by Peter O'Loghlen	Member for Forrest; 1910	Succeeded by Peter O'Loghlen
