= Fletcher Jones =

Fletcher Jones may refer to:

- Fletcher Jones (Australian entrepreneur) (1895–1977), Australian clothing manufacturer and retailer
- Fletcher Jones (American entrepreneur) (1931–1972), American businessman and computer pioneer

== See also ==
- Fletcher-Jones, English songwriting team
