= Thomas Moore (Australian politician) =

Australian trade unionist and politician

The Honourable Thomas Moore

Member of the Legislative Assembly of Western Australia
- In office 28 April – 17 June 1913
- Preceded by: Peter O'Loghlen
- Succeeded by: Peter O'Loghlen
- Constituency: Forrest

Member of the Legislative Council of Western Australia
- In office 22 May 1920 – 21 May 1926
- Preceded by: Henry Carson
- Succeeded by: George Kempton
- Constituency: Central Province
- In office 22 May 1932 – 21 May 1946
- Preceded by: George Kempton
- Succeeded by: Charles Simpson
- Constituency: Central Province

Personal details
- Born: 14 February 1881 Knowsley, Victoria, Australia
- Died: 13 January 1961 (aged 79) Nedlands, Western Australia, Australia
- Party: Labor

Thomas James Moore (14 February 1881 – 13 January 1961) was an Australian trade unionist and politician who served in both houses of the Parliament of Western Australia. He was a member of the Legislative Assembly for less than two months in 1913, in unusual circumstances, and later served in the Legislative Council from 1920 to 1926 and from 1932 to 1946.

Moore was born in Knowsley, Victoria (near Axedale), to Mary (née Quinn) and Thomas Moore. He came to Western Australia in 1904, and settled in Dwellingup, where he worked in the timber industry. He had a long-standing involvement with the Timber Workers' Union, and served as its president from 1912 to 1915. In April 1913, the sitting Labor member for the seat of Forrest, Peter O'Loghlen, resigned his seat in state parliament to contest the 1913 federal election. Moore was preselected as the replacement Labor candidate, and won the by-election unopposed. However, O'Loghlen was unsuccessful in his bid for federal parliament, and Moore resigned from parliament without being sworn in to allow him to take his old seat.

In October 1916, Moore enlisted in the Australian Imperial Force. He served in France as a corporal with the 48th Battalion, and was wounded in action in April 1918, resulting in his discharge later in the year. On returning to Australia, Moore settled in Ballidu, a small Wheatbelt town. He later purchased a wheat farm near Mullewa (in the Mid-West). Moore returned to parliament at the 1920 Legislative Council elections, defeating the sitting Country Party member in Central Province, Henry Carson. He was defeated by George Kempton in 1926, but returned in 1932, and served another two terms before retiring in 1946. Moore died in Perth in 1961, aged 79. He had married twice, having two children by his first wife and seven by his second.

Parliament of Western Australia
Preceded by Peter O'Loghlen	Member for Forrest; 1913	Succeeded by Peter O'Loghlen
