= George Kempton =

Australian dentist and politician

Member of the Legislative Council of Western Australia
- In office 22 May 1926 – 21 May 1932
- Preceded by: Thomas Moore
- Succeeded by: Thomas Moore
- Constituency: Central Province

Personal details
- Born: 6 August 1871 Malvern, Victoria, Australia
- Died: 7 June 1945 (aged 73) Claremont, Western Australia, Australia
- Party: Country

George Adam Kempton (6 August 1871 – 7 June 1945) was an Australian dentist and politician who served as a Country Party member of the Legislative Council of Western Australia from 1926 to 1932, representing Central Province. He also served three terms as mayor of Geraldton.

== Early life ==
Kempton was born in Malvern, Victoria, to Anna (née Norman) and Thomas Kempton. He came to Western Australia in 1892, during the gold rush, and prospected for several years in the Coolgardie and Lake Carey districts. Kempton worked in Boulder as a storekeeper from 1895 to 1899, and then moved to Perth to work as a dentist's assistant. He gained a diploma in dentistry in 1905, and subsequently practised in the North-West for three years before moving to Geraldton in 1908.

== Politics and later life ==
Kempton was elected to the Geraldton Municipal Council in 1910, and later served three terms as the town's mayor – from 1913 to 1915, from 1920 to 1921, and from 1923 to 1924. He entered parliament at the 1926 Legislative Council election, defeating the sitting Labor member, Thomas Moore. Kempton served a single six-year term before Moore reclaimed his seat at the 1932 election. He subsequently returned to his dentistry practice, and eventually retired to Perth, dying there in June 1945 (aged 73). Kempton had been married twice, having two children by his first wife and five by his second.

== See also ==
- Members of the Western Australian Legislative Council
