= Albert Wilson (politician) =

Australian politician (1878–c.1916)

Member of the Legislative Assembly of Western Australia
- In office 24 June 1904 – 11 September 1908
- Preceded by: None (new seat)
- Succeeded by: Peter O'Loghlen
- Constituency: Forrest

Personal details
- Born: 9 March 1878 Glasgow, Scotland
- Died: After 1916
- Party: Labor (to 1906); Liberal (1911)
- Other political affiliations: Independent (1906–1908)

Albert James Wilson (9 March 1878 – after 1916) was an Australian politician who was a member of the Legislative Assembly of Western Australia from 1904 to 1908, representing the seat of Forrest.

Wilson was born in Glasgow, Scotland, to Lillian (née Armour) and Robert Muir Wilson. He arrived in Western Australia in 1895, and began working as a carpenter in the South West. He served as secretary of the Timber Workers' Union in 1899, and later was an organiser for the Amalgamated Workers' Association (a general union). Wilson first stood for parliament at the 1901 state election (aged 23), as the endorsed Labor Party candidate for the seat of Murray, but was defeated by William George. George resigned from parliament the following year, and Wilson contested the resulting by-election, but was defeated by William Atkins. He eventually entered parliament on his third attempt, winning the newly created seat of Forrest at the 1904 state election, and was re-elected unopposed at the 1905 election.

In January 1906, Wilson was sent to the eastern states for three months to conduct an investigation into the timber industry, compiling a report for the state government. His recommendations were perceived as favouring the interests of the industry's employers over its employees, and it was later found that a timber company (Millars (company)Millars) had paid some of his expenses. For this, he was censured by the parliament Labor caucus, and also strongly criticised by The Sunday Times. Wilson subsequently left the Labor Party to sit as an independent, and often voted with the government of Newton Moore. He did not contest Forrest at the 1908 state election, but instead stood for the seat of Roebourne, where he was defeated by Henry Osborn.

Having returned to the South-West, Wilson contested the 1910 Forrest by-election. He was defeated by a large margin, losing to the Labor Party's Peter O'Loghlen, who had succeeded him in the seat at the 1908 election. At the 1911 state election, Wilson contested the seat of Roebourne for a second time (representing the new Liberal Party), but was defeated by Labor's Joseph Gardiner. He was known to be living in Perth in 1916, but his whereabouts after that (including his date of death) are unknown. He had married Beatrice Maude Baker in 1902.

Parliament of Western Australia
New seat	Member for Forrest; 1904–1908	Succeeded by Peter O'Loghlen
