= Fletcher Jones (Australian entrepreneur) =

Australian businessman

Sir David Fletcher Jones OBE (14 August 1895 – 22 February 1977) was an Australian clothing manufacturer and retailer. He is considered a pioneer in workforce participation. It has been claimed that "Arguably, no single person or firm had done more to transform and, for a time, homogenize Australian dress standards, particularly among men, than Fletcher Jones and his staff."

== Biography ==
Jones was born in Bendigo, Victoria, the son of a Cornish miner. In his childhood he had a stammer, but he practised reading aloud to manage this. He left school at age 12.

He served with Australian forces in France in World War I where he suffered shell shock after being buried alive for several hours. On his return his stammer had returned, but he was determined to manage it so he commenced a door-to-door sales business in Melbourne. He then decided to become a hawker in the western Victorian region. He purchased a menswear store in Warrnambool in 1924. His business expanded, and in 1941 he decided to form a new wholesale business making nothing but high-quality ready-made trousers. The business was boosted by a war time contract for army pants, and rapidly made a reputation for hard-wearing, 'coverdine' work trousers, for men on the land. By 1945 his Warrnambool rooms were supplying 123 retailers in four States, but he then decided to sell directly, to insist on personal fittings, and to accept cash only. When his first shop opened in Collins Street, Melbourne, on 23 June 1946, the response was astonishing, with queues stretching for blocks.

In 1948 he constructed a spacious factory on the site of a rubbish dump near Warrnambool, which had once been a quarry. The site was extensively renewed with gardens, and became a much-visited tourist attraction.

In the late 1940s he began to turn his business into a co-operative, named Fletcher Jones & Staff Pty Ltd. Initially the Jones family had a two-thirds interest and the staff one-third, but the balance gradually swung so that by the 1970s the staff held over 50 per cent of the shares. From the mid-1950s, the business also made women's attire.

Fletcher Jones & Staff was awarded a contract to outfit the Australian women's team for the 1956 Summer Olympics in Melbourne. At its peak, the company had over 2,700 employees and 55 stores in six states and the Australian Capital Territory.

Jones was appointed an Officer of the Order of the Order of the British Empire (OBE) in 1959, and was made a Knight Bachelor in 1974 for services to decentralisation and the community.

Being located in a major wool producing area, Jones concentrated for many years on using the best local wool in its garments, and by the 1960s, was the largest Australian user of fine merino wool.

Although he had always expressed Labor sympathies in word and deed, he publicly renounced his political allegiances when the Labor Prime Minister Gough Whitlam and his wife Margaret made it known they were agnostics.

His first wife died in 1970, and he remarried in 1971 to Ada Wells, née Pettigrove. He published his autobiography Not By Myself in 1976. Jones died in Warrnambool in 1977, and was buried there. He was survived by his second wife Ada, and by the daughter and two sons of his first marriage.

His company was sold in 1998.

== Legacy ==
A one-hour Australian documentary The Fabric of a Dream: The Fletcher Jones Story screened on SBS Television on 7 September 2007, 27 March 2009 (SBS One), 30 December 2009 (SBS One), 10 November 2010 and again on 17 June 2011 (SBS Two). It is available from Film Australia.

An art competition, the Fletcher Jones Art Prize (now the Geelong contemporary art prize), valued at $30,000, is held annually at the Geelong Gallery.

In August 2018 an exhibition of 44 wood-relief art works by Warrnambool artist Glenn Morgan depicting the Fletcher Jones story was put on display at the restored Fletcher Jones factory in Warrnambool.

Australian author Jock Serong published in 2026 a book about the live and achievements of Jones, A Suitable Man – The Eccentric Empire of Fletcher Jones.

== Fate of the business ==
On 8 December 2011, the more than 40 Fletcher Jones stores were placed into administration. On 14 December, it was announced that 15 of the stores, including one at Warrnambool where the company started, would close immediately. The remaining 30 stores remained open.

In January 2026, the company announced it would close all remaining stores and its online store by the end of the month. Matthew Gowty, owner of Fletcher Jones, plans to sell the brand.
