= Alfred Reynolds (politician) =

Australian politician

Alfred George Reynolds MLA
- Alfred Reynolds in uniform in 1918

Member of the Legislative Assembly
- In office 1947–1950
- Preceded by: Edward Holman
- Succeeded by: Division abolished

Member of Parliament for Forrest

Personal details
- Born: 22 May 1894 Milton, Queensland
- Died: 23 April 1976 (aged 81) Como, Western Australia
- Party: Labor Party
- Spouse(s): Monica Magdalene McKenna, Marion Elizabeth Barnett
- Profession: Accountant, Wool Classer, Soldier

Alfred George Reynolds (22 May 1894 – 23 April 1976) was an Australian politician. He was the Labor member for Forrest in the Western Australian Legislative Assembly from 1947 to 1950.

Born in Milton, Queensland, on 22 May 1894, Reynolds joined the Australian Imperial Forces at the outbreak of the First World War with the regimental service number 62. He joined the 3rd Field Ambulance of the 1st Australian Division and served as a stretcher bearer and batman throughout the war, landing at Gallipoli from HMS Ribble before dawn on 25 April 1915 and through the Western Front battles of Fromelles, Mouquet Farm, Ypres, Menin Road and the German counter attacks of Operation Michael and Operation Georgette and finishing with the Battle of Épehy. He arrived back in Sydney on 5 December 1918.

On his return he married Monica McKenna, the youngest daughter of John McKenna the Commissioner of the Western Australia Police and took up soldier settlement land at Mukinbudin. They had six children. Monica died on 4 July 1932 and Reynolds in the same year married Elizabeth Barnett, the local schoolteacher. They had a further two children.

Reynolds lost the farm as a result of the Great Depression and moved to York, Western Australia, working as a farm manager and accountant. After his experiences in the War, he maintained an interest in politics, standing in turn for the Federal Division of Swan as an Independent Country Party candidate, the State Electoral district of Forrest (successfully) and the State Electoral district of Canning for the Labor Party, after Forrest was abolished in the redistribution before the 1950 election. Reynolds was defeated at the election.

He died on 23 April 1976.

One of his grandchildren is Linda Reynolds, a Liberal Senator for the State of Western Australia.
