= Edward Holman =

Australian politician

Member of the Western Australian Parliament for Forrest
- In office 20 May 1939 – 15 March 1947
- Preceded by: May Holman
- Succeeded by: Alfred Reynolds

Personal details
- Born: 9 August 1904 Cue, Western Australia, Australia
- Died: 26 July 1951 (aged 46) Perth, Western Australia, Australia
- Party: Labor
- Spouse: Mildred Payne (m. 1928)
- Relations: John Holman (father); May Holman (sister)

Edward Joseph Frederick Holman (9 August 1904 – 26 July 1951) was an Australian politician. He was the son of John Holman and Katherine Mary (née Rowe) and the brother of May Holman, the first female Labor MP in Australia. He succeeded his sister as the Labor member for Forrest in the Western Australian Legislative Assembly, serving from 1939 to 1947.

Holman stood unsuccessfully for the Senate at the 1934 federal election. He was also an unsuccessful candidate for the seat of North Perth at the 1936 and 1939 state elections.

He died at Royal Perth Hospital on 26 July 1951, aged 47, after collapsing at his home in Nedlands the night before.
