= John Holman (politician) =

Australian politician (1872–1925)

John B. Holman AM
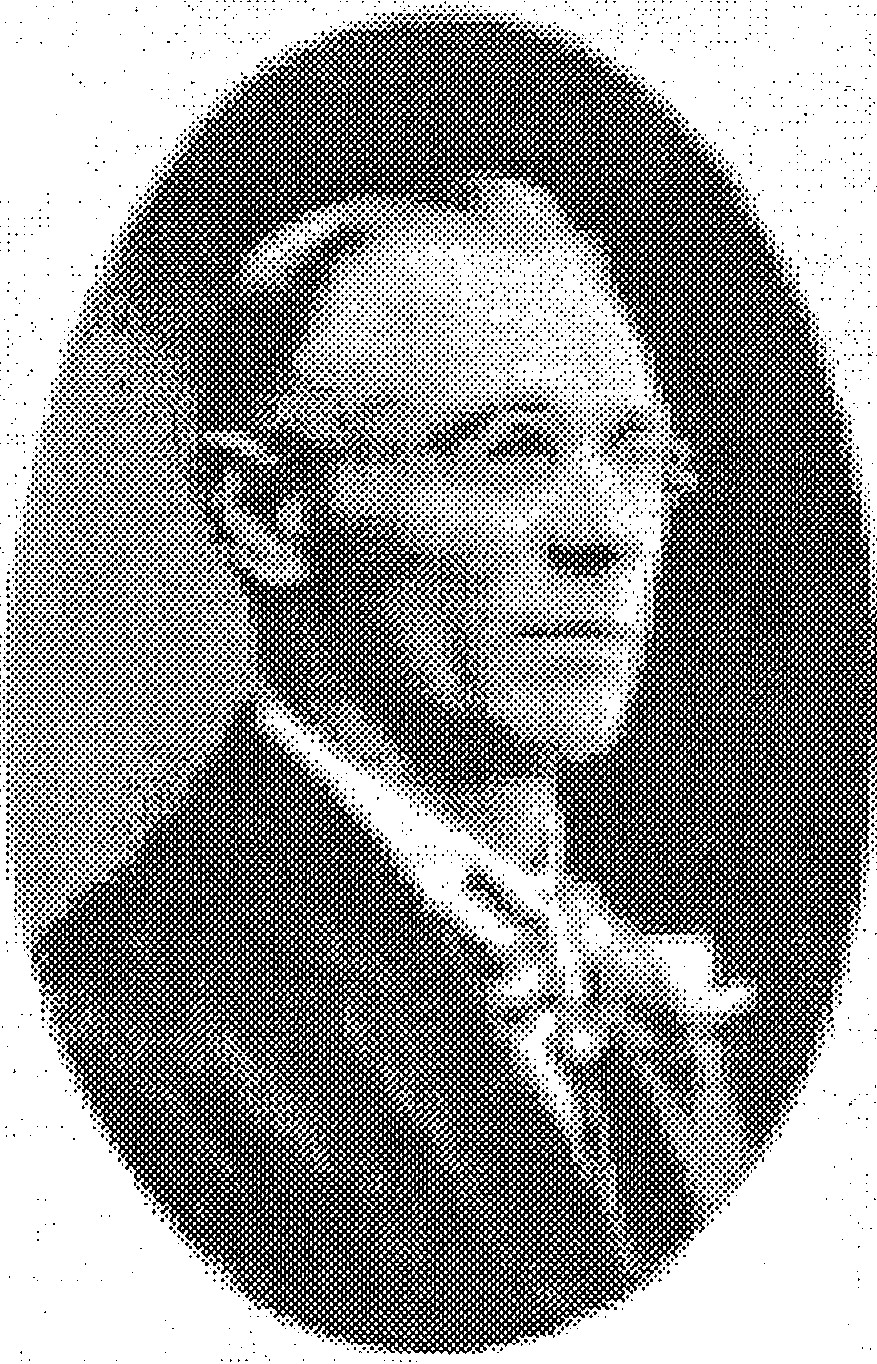

Member of the Western Australian Legislative Assembly for Western Australia
- In office 1901–1921
- In office 1923–1925

Personal details
- Born: 26 February 1872 Clunes, Victoria
- Died: 23 February 1925 (aged 52) Subiaco, Western Australia
- Resting place: Karrakatta Cemetery; 31°58′11.32″S 115°47′54.3″E
- Spouse: Katherine Row (m. 1893)
- Children: 10, including May and Edward

John Barkell Holman (26 February 1872 – 23 February 1925) was an Australian politician who served in the Western Australian Legislative Assembly from 1901 to 1921 and 1923 to 1925.

== Early life ==
Holman was born on 26 February 1872 at Clunes in colonial Victoria, the son of Cornish parents. His father, Edward Holman, was a miner born in 1841 at Gwinear, Cornwall. His mother, Mary Anne (née Barkell), was born in 1837 at St Austell, Cornwall. He was educated at Bendigo, then worked as a miner, first at Bendigo, where he became a member of the Bendigo Miners' Association in 1886; and later at Broken Hill, New South Wales, where he was involved in the strike of 1892. On 14 February 1893, he married Katherine Mary Row at Broken Hill; they had four sons and six daughters.

== Western Australia ==
Holman migrated to Western Australia in 1893. He became active in the Labour movement, leading a strike at Day Dawn in 1896, and becoming a workers' advocate before the State Arbitration Court for many unions. By 1901 he was working in the Murchison district as a journalist, and was an organiser for the Amalgamated Workers Union. He contested the Western Australian Legislative Assembly seat of Mount Magnet in the election of April 1901, but was defeated by Frank Wallace.

On 10 December 1901, Holman was elected to the Legislative Assembly seat of North Murchison in a ministerial by-election, defeating Frederick Moorhead. The following year he was elected general president of the Western Australian branches of the Australian Workers' Union. In 1904 the seat of North Murchison was abolished, and Holman contested and won the seat of Murchison. He held this seat for nearly 17 years. From 10 August 1904 to 7 June 1905 he was Minister for Railways and Labour in Henry Daglish's short-lived Labor ministry.

== Late career ==
Holman was secretary of the Federated Timber Workers' Union from 1908 until his death in 1925. He was Chairman of Committees in the Legislative Assembly from 1 November 1911 to 22 March 1917, and later acted as secretary and whip for the Parliamentary Labor Party. He launched the Labor newspaper The Labor Vanguard, and became chairman of directors for the People's Printing Company.

Holman lost Labor preselection for his seat in the election of 12 March 1921, and instead unsuccessfully contested the seat of Swan. The following year he contested for the Australian House of Representatives seat of Swan, again without success. However, on 8 December 1923, he won the Legislative Assembly seat of Forrest in a by-election occasioned by the death of Peter O'Loghlen. He held the seat until his death.

== Death ==
John Holman died at St John of God Hospital in Subiaco, Perth, on 23 February 1925 from complications following an appendicectomy, and was buried at Karrakatta Cemetery. His daughter, May Holman, was elected to the Legislative Assembly in his seat, becoming only the second woman to enter an Australian parliament, and the first for the Labor party. One of his sons, Edward Holman, also became a member of the Legislative Assembly.
