= May Holman =

Australian politician (1893–1939)

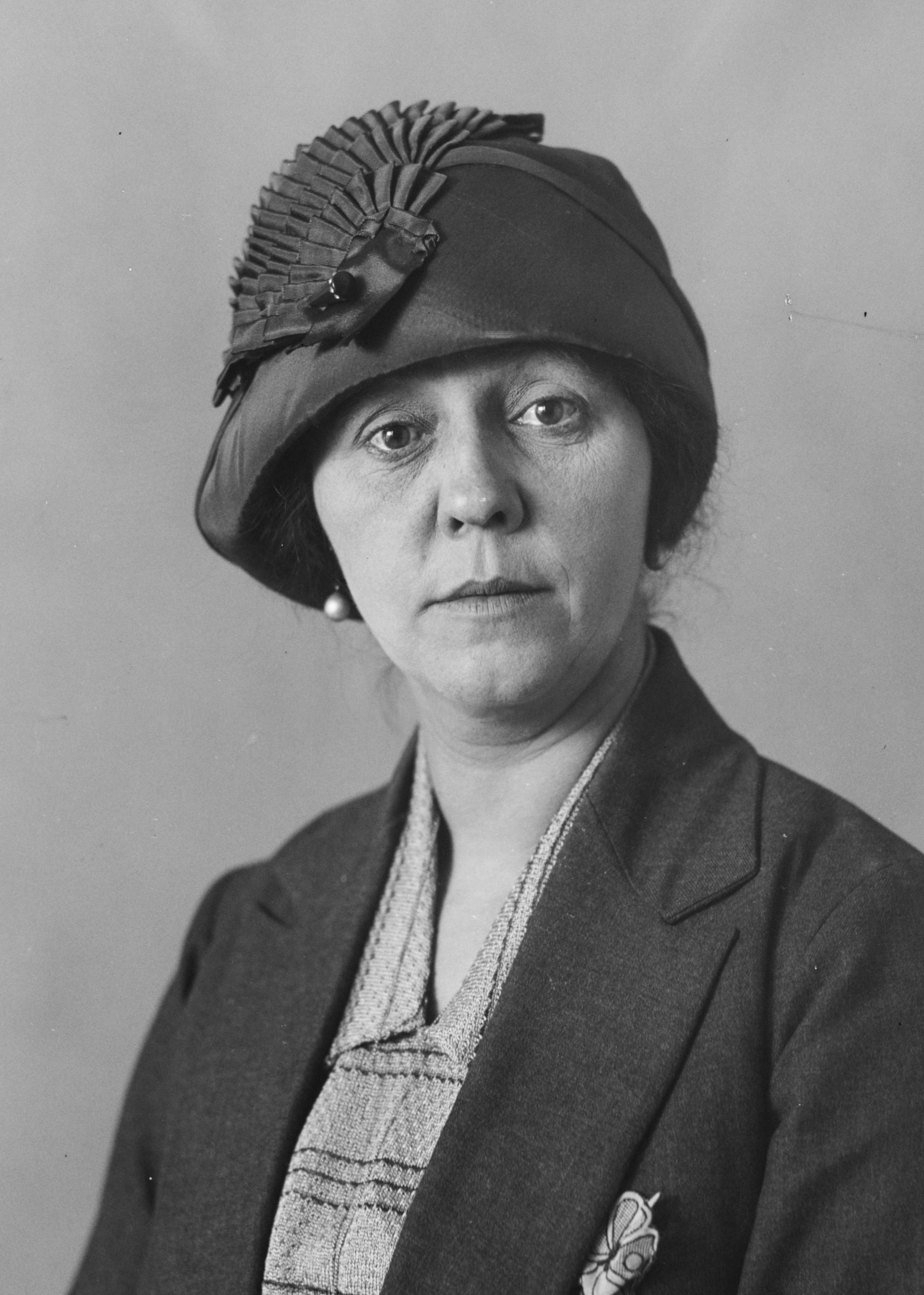
- Holman in 1927

Member of the Western Australian Parliament for Forrest
- In office 3 April 1925 – 20 March 1939
- Preceded by: John Holman
- Succeeded by: Edward Holman

Personal details
- Born: Mary Alice Holman; 18 July 1893 Broken Hill, New South Wales, Australia
- Died: 20 March 1939 (aged 45) Bunbury, Western Australia, Australia
- Resting place: Karrakatta Cemetery
- Party: Labor
- Spouse: Joseph Gardiner (m. 1914; div. 1920)
- Relations: John Holman (father); Edward Holman (brother)

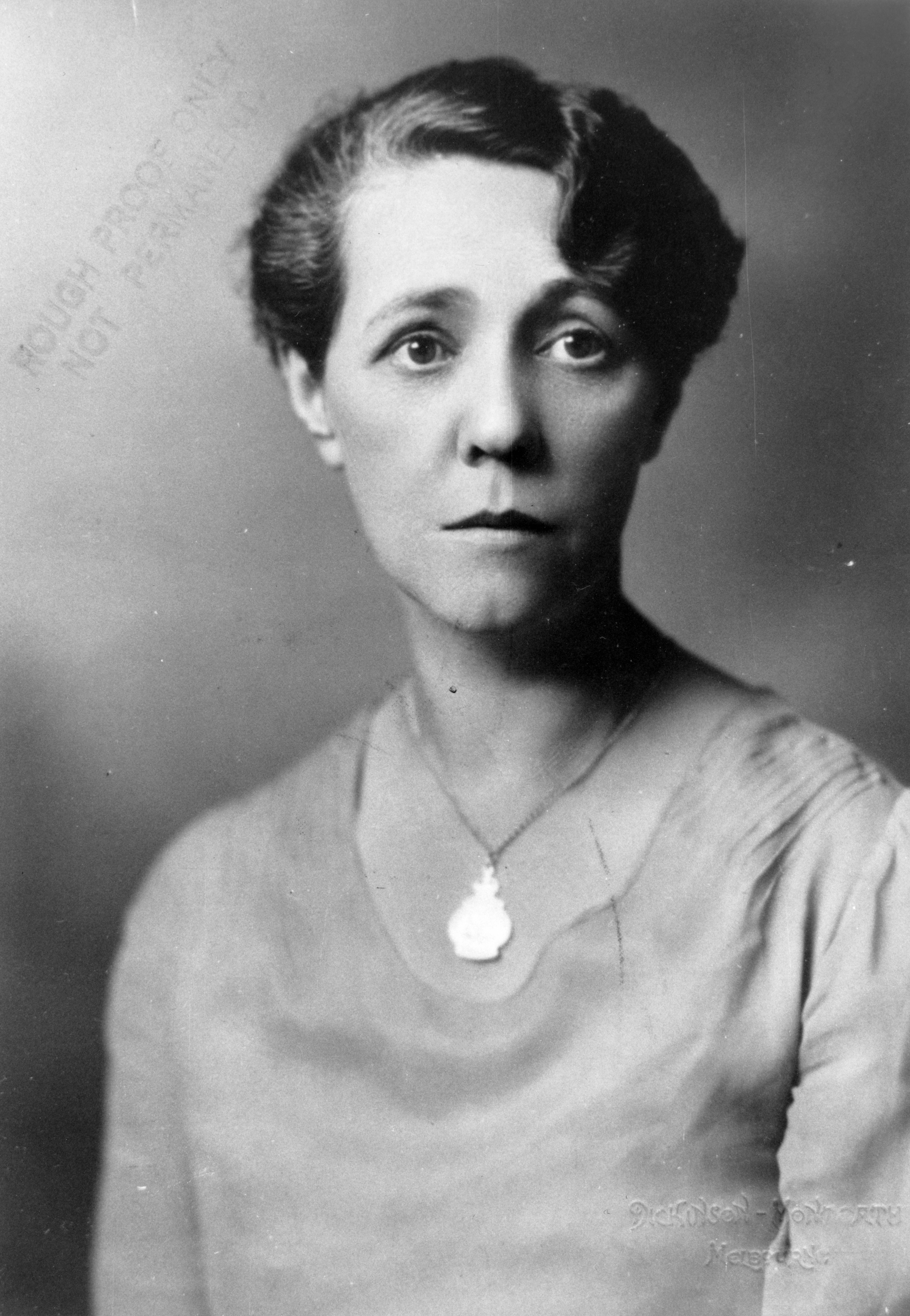
Holman, undated

Mary Alice "May" Holman (18 July 1893 – 20 March 1939) was an Australian politician. She was a member of the Australian Labor Party (ALP) and served in the Western Australian Legislative Assembly from 1925 until her death in 1939. She was the first woman to represent the ALP in an Australian legislature and the second woman to serve in the Parliament of Western Australia, after Edith Cowan.

== Early life ==
Holman was born on 18 July 1893 in Broken Hill, New South Wales. She was the first of eleven children born to Katherine Mary (née Rowe) and John Barkell Holman, who married five months before her birth. Two of her siblings died as infants. Her father was the son of a Cornish miner who had moved to Australia during the Victorian gold rush. He had worked as a miner himself from the age of 14, initially in Bendigo and then in Broken Hill, and was active in the movement for miners' rights.

Holman's father moved to Western Australia one week after her birth, working on the Murchison goldfields. She and her mother joined him in 1895, living in makeshift accommodation in the town of Nannine. They later moved to the larger town of Cue, following a brief return to Broken Hill where her mother gave birth to her oldest sister Katherine. Holman's father was active in the labour movement on the goldfields and won election to the Western Australian Legislative Assembly in 1901, holding the seats of North Murchison and later Murchison. He was minister for railways in Western Australia's inaugural ALP government from 1904 to 1905. Despite her father's political success, Holman and her family did not move to the state capital of Perth until 1905, settling on Beaufort Street. Three more of her siblings were born in the goldfields and the remaining five in Perth, the youngest of whom was born in 1918 and died in the same year.

Holman was educated at the Dominican Convent in Cue and the Sacred Heart Convent in Perth. She was a talented musician and vocalist, obtaining the rank of licentiate of the Trinity College of Music and the Associated Boards, and performing both classical music and musical comedy. She "organized choirs and performed in concerts, plays, balls and fêtes", heading a musical group called The Entertainers. Holman began working as a typist at the Perth Trades Hall in 1911 and in 1914 joined the staff of the Westralian Worker, the ALP's official newspaper. She began working for her father in 1918, assisting him both with constituency work and in his role as state secretary of the Australian Timber Workers' Union.

== Parliament ==
Holman's father died in early 1925. She successfully nominated for ALP preselection for the resulting by-election, defeating ten male candidates. She was elected unopposed on 3 April 1925.

In 1930, the women's executive of her party, and the Women's Service Guilds, nominated Holman as a delegate to the League of Nations Assembly.

== Death ==
On 17 March 1939, one day before the 1939 state election, Holman was severely injured in a car accident while travelling to an election meeting in the small settlement of Brookhampton in her electorate. The car, driven by her sister Iris Demasson, skidded in loose gravel while travelling at speed and collided with the bank of a drain, causing it to overturn. Her sister received minor injuries but she was pinned under the vehicle, receiving internal injuries, two broken legs, a broken arm and broken ribs. Holman was taken to St John of God Bunbury Hospital where she died on 20 March at the age of 45. Prior to her death she was informed that she had won election to parliament for a sixth time.

Holman was buried at Karrakatta Cemetery following a requiem mass at St Mary's Cathedral, Perth. Her funeral procession was watched by thousands of people and was attended by state premier John Willcock and federal ALP leader John Curtin. Her brother Edward Holman succeeded her in parliament.

== Personal life ==
On 9 May 1914, aged 20, Holman married her father's parliamentary colleague Joseph Gardiner at the registry office in Perth. The marriage was initially kept secret from her family due to their disapproval.

In September 1919, Holman petitioned for divorce "by reason of desertion for five years and upwards", swearing in an affidavit that the couple had never lived together and that he had never contributed to her financially. Gardiner did not defend the case and the marriage was formally dissolved on 18 July 1920.
