= Electoral district of Forrest =

Former electoral district of Western Australia

Forrest Western Australia—Legislative Assembly
- State: Western Australia
- Dates current: 1904–1950

Forrest was an electoral district of the Legislative Assembly in the Australian state of Western Australia from 1904 to 1950. It was based in the South West region of the state, in the timber milling areas near the town of Dwellingup.

From the first time it was contested at the 1904 state election, the district was always a reliable Labor Party seat. Its first member was Albert Wilson. He was succeeded at the 1908 state election by Peter O'Loghlen. O'Loughlen resigned the seat to contest the federal division of Swan at the 1913 Australian federal election. The by-election to replace him was won by Labor candidate Thomas Moore, who stood unopposed. But with O'Loughlen losing the contest for the federal seat of Swan, Moore resigned before he could be seated and O'Loughlen won a second by-election.

O'Loughlen's death in 1923 triggered a by-election that was won by Labor candidate John Holman. Holman himself died in 1925 and was succeeded at the subsequent by-election by his daughter May Holman. May Holman—the first female representative of an Australian parliament to belong to the Labor Party—held the seat until her death in a car accident on the day of the 1939 state election. The by-election to succeed her was won by her brother Edward Holman. He was succeeded at the 1947 state election by Alfred Reynolds, who held the seat until its abolition at the 1950 state election.

== Members for Forrest ==
Member	Party	Term
Albert Wilson	Labor	1904–1906
Albert Wilson	Independent	1906–1908
Peter O'Loghlen	Labor	1908–1910
Dennis Jones	Labor	1910
Peter O'Loghlen	Labor	1910–1913
Thomas Moore	Labor	1913
Peter O'Loghlen	Labor	1913–1923
John Holman	Labor	1923–1925
May Holman	Labor	1925–1939
Edward Holman	Labor	1939–1947
Alfred Reynolds	Labor	1947–1950
