= Peter O'Loghlen (Australian politician) =

Australian politician

Peter Laurence O'Loghlen (24 April 1882 – 13 November 1923 ) was an Australian politician. He was the Labor member for Forrest in the Western Australian Legislative Assembly from 1908 to 1923.
