= Electoral results for the district of Kavel =

South Australian district election results

This is a list of electoral results for the Electoral district of Kavel in South Australian state elections.

== Members for Kavel ==
Member	Party	Term
Roger Goldsworthy	Liberal and Country	1970–1974
Roger Goldsworthy	Liberal	1974–1992
John Olsen	Liberal	1992–2002
Mark Goldsworthy	Liberal	2002–2018
Dan Cregan	Liberal	2018–2021
Dan Cregan	Independent	2021–2026
Matt Schultz	Independent	2026–present

== Election results ==
=== Elections in the 2020s ===
==== 2026 ====
2026 South Australian state election: Kavel
Party	Candidate	Votes	%	±%
Labor	David Leach	5,901	23.5	+8.9
Independent	Matt Schultz	5,227	20.9	+20.9
Liberal	Bradley Orr	4,990	19.9	−0.2
One Nation	Christiaan Loch	4,890	19.5	+15.8
Greens	Sam Tyler	2,767	11.0	+2.9
Animal Justice	Padma Chaplin	392	1.6	−1.0
Family First	Dayle Baker	351	1.4	+1.4
Real Change	Ashley Moule	256	1.0	+1.0
Independent	Jacob van Raalte	127	0.5	+0.5
Australian Family	Baden Ashman	115	0.5	+0.5
Fair Go	David Stone	48	0.2	+0.2
Total formal votes		25,064	94.8	−2.7
Informal votes		1,384	5.2	+2.7
Turnout		26,448	91.3	+0.0
Two-candidate-preferred result
Independent	Matt Schultz	15,182	60.6	+60.6
Labor	David Leach	9,882	39.4	+39.4
Independent gain from Independent				

==== 2022 ====
2022 South Australian state election: Kavel
Party	Candidate	Votes	%	±%
Independent	Dan Cregan	12,199	50.5	+50.5
Liberal	Rowan Mumford	5,036	20.8	−26.4
Labor	Glen Dallimore	3,458	14.3	−1.7
Greens	Melanie Selwood	1,978	8.2	−1.0
One Nation	Gayle Allwood	894	3.7	+3.7
Animal Justice	Padma Chaplin	599	2.5	−0.3
Total formal votes		24,164	97.5	
Informal votes		625	2.5	
Turnout		24,789	91.3	
Notional two-party-preferred count
Liberal	Rowan Mumford	13,194	54.6	−9.8
Labor	Glen Dallimore	10,970	45.4	+9.8
Two-candidate-preferred result
Independent	Dan Cregan	18,231	75.4	+75.4
Liberal	Rowan Mumford	5,933	24.6	−39.9
Independent hold				

Distribution of preferences: Kavel
Party	Candidate	Votes	Round 1		Round 2		Round 3		Round 4	
Party	Candidate	Votes	Dist.	Total	Dist.	Total	Dist.	Total	Dist.	Total
Quota (50% + 1)		12,083								
Independent	Dan Cregan	12,199	+103	12,302	+662	12,964	+968	13,932	+4,299	18,231
Liberal	Rowan Mumford	5,036	+30	5,066	+138	5,204	+137	5,341	+592	5,933
Labor	Glen Dallimore	3,458	+67	3,525	+67	3,592	+1,299	4,891	Excluded	
Greens	Melanie Selwood	1,978	+347	2,325	+79	2,404	Excluded			
One Nation	Gayle Allwood	894	+52	946	Excluded					
Animal Justice	Padma Chaplin	599	Excluded							

=== Elections in the 2010s ===
==== 2018 ====
2018 South Australian state election: Kavel
Party	Candidate	Votes	%	±%
Liberal	Dan Cregan	10,374	48.1	−6.3
SA-Best	Andrew Stratford	4,217	19.6	+19.6
Labor	Glen Dallimore	3,436	15.9	−6.0
Greens	Ian Grosser	1,963	9.1	−7.2
Animal Justice	Louise Pfeiffer	644	3.0	+3.0
Conservatives	Howard Hollow	615	2.9	−4.0
Dignity	Cristina Rodert	313	1.5	+0.9
Total formal votes		21,562	96.4	−0.8
Informal votes		816	3.6	+0.8
Turnout		22,378	92.7	+4.1
Two-party-preferred result
Liberal	Dan Cregan	13,965	64.8	+1.0
Labor	Glen Dallimore	7,597	35.2	−1.0
Two-candidate-preferred result
Liberal	Dan Cregan	12,878	59.7	−4.1
SA-Best	Andrew Stratford	8,684	40.3	+40.3
Liberal hold				

2014 South Australian state election: Kavel
Party	Candidate	Votes	%	±%
Liberal	Mark Goldsworthy	12,116	54.4	−1.2
Labor	Richard Hilton	4,838	21.7	−2.0
Greens	Ian Grosser	3,481	15.6	+2.9
Family First	Darryl Stott	1,854	8.3	+2.9
Total formal votes		22,289	97.1	−0.0
Informal votes		655	2.9	+0.0
Turnout		22,944	92.6	−0.2
Two-party-preferred result
Liberal	Mark Goldsworthy	14,258	64.0	−1.8
Labor	Richard Hilton	8,031	36.0	+1.8
Liberal hold		Swing	−1.8	

2010 South Australian state election: Kavel
Party	Candidate	Votes	%	±%
Liberal	Mark Goldsworthy	11,389	55.6	+12.4
Labor	John Fulbrook	4,861	23.7	−2.3
Greens	Ian Grosser	2,604	12.7	+2.7
Family First	Colin Croft	1,110	5.4	−9.8
Democrats	Kathy Brazher-de Laine	529	2.6	−1.3
Total formal votes		20,493	96.8	
Informal votes		602	3.2	
Turnout		21,095	92.8	
Two-party-preferred result
Liberal	Mark Goldsworthy	13,486	65.8	+7.8
Labor	John Fulbrook	7,007	34.2	−7.8
Liberal hold		Swing	+7.8	

=== Elections in the 2000s ===
2006 South Australian state election: Kavel
Party	Candidate	Votes	%	±%
Liberal	Mark Goldsworthy	8,590	43.9	−0.4
Labor	John Marshall	4,868	24.9	+6.8
Family First	Tom Playford V	3,081	15.7	+15.5
Greens	Renata Zilm	1,951	10.0	+4.5
Democrats	Kathy Brazher-De Laine	709	3.6	−5.9
One Nation	Robert Fechner	373	1.9	−0.1
Total formal votes		19,572	96.5	
Informal votes		644	3.5	
Turnout		20,216	91.9	
Two-party-preferred result
Liberal	Mark Goldsworthy	11,624	59.4	+6.5
Labor	John Marshall	7,948	40.6	+40.6
Liberal hold		Swing	N/A	

2002 South Australian state election: Kavel
Party	Candidate	Votes	%	±%
Liberal	Mark Goldsworthy	8,974	43.4	−9.1
Independent	Tom Playford V	3,860	18.7	+18.7
Labor	Mel Hopgood	3,718	18.0	−1.4
Democrats	Cathi Tucker-Lee	1,874	9.1	−13.7
Greens	Felicity Martin	1,089	5.3	+5.3
SA First	Peter Robins	708	3.4	+3.4
One Nation	Basil Hille	459	2.2	+2.2
Total formal votes		20,682	96.9	
Informal votes		669	3.1	
Turnout		21,351	93.8	
Two-party-preferred result
Liberal	Mark Goldsworthy		63.1	−1.9
Labor	Mel Hopgood		36.9	+1.9
Two-candidate-preferred result
Liberal	Mark Goldsworthy	10,938	52.9	−3.8
Independent	Tom Playford V	9,744	47.1	+47.1
Liberal hold		Swing	N/A	

=== Elections in the 1990s ===
1997 South Australian state election: Kavel
Party	Candidate	Votes	%	±%
Liberal	John Olsen	9,691	52.3	−13.8
Democrats	Cathi Tucker-Lee	4,306	23.2	+12.9
Labor	Robert Kieselbach	3,686	19.9	+1.9
United Australia	Evan Trousse	852	4.6	+4.6
Total formal votes		18,535	95.8	−1.5
Informal votes		803	4.2	+1.5
Turnout		19,338	91.5	
Two-party-preferred result
Liberal	John Olsen	12,039	65.0	−9.1
Labor	Robert Kieselbach	6,496	35.0	+9.1
Two-candidate-preferred result
Liberal	John Olsen	10,437	56.3	−17.7
Democrats	Cathi Tucker-Lee	8,098	43.7	+43.7
Liberal hold		Swing	N/A	

1993 South Australian state election: Kavel
Party	Candidate	Votes	%	±%
Liberal	John Olsen	12,521	66.3	+8.3
Labor	Joseph Kane	3,360	17.8	−7.2
Democrats	Peter Brzycki	1,954	10.4	−3.0
Independent	Graeme Watts	622	3.3	+3.3
Natural Law	Lyndal Vincent	421	2.2	+2.2
Total formal votes		18,878	97.4	0.0
Informal votes		510	2.6	0.0
Turnout		19,388	93.8	
Two-party-preferred result
Liberal	John Olsen	14,019	74.3	+7.4
Labor	Joseph Kane	4,859	25.7	−7.4
Liberal hold		Swing	+7.4	

1992 Kavel state by-election
Party	Candidate	Votes	%	±%
Liberal	J Olsen	10,381	53.4	−2.4
Democrats	J Blundell	3,054	15.7	+2.7
Labor	L Stevens	2,816	14.5	−11.6
Independent Alliance	G C Watts	1,591	8.2	+8.2
Grey Power	S L B Batten	1,127	5.8	+5.8
Independent	J D Henderson	457	2.4	+2.4
Total formal votes		19,426	96.4	N/A
Informal votes		716	3.6	N/A
Turnout		20,142	83.9	N/A
Two-candidate-preferred result
Liberal	J Olsen	11,989	61.7	−3.8
Democrats	J Blundell	7,437	38.3	+38.3
Liberal hold		Swing	N/A	

=== Elections in the 1980s ===
1989 South Australian state election: Kavel
Party	Candidate	Votes	%	±%
Liberal	Roger Goldsworthy	11,560	55.8	+3.7
Labor	Warren Smith	5,410	26.1	−8.9
Democrats	Michel Francis	2,698	13.0	+13.0
Call to Australia	Graeme Watts	1,046	5.1	+5.1
Total formal votes		20,714	97.8	+0.8
Informal votes		465	2.2	−0.8
Turnout		21,179	95.6	+2.1
Two-party-preferred result
Liberal	Roger Goldsworthy	13,567	65.5	+3.7
Labor	Warren Smith	7,174	34.5	−3.7
Liberal hold		Swing	+3.7	

1985 South Australian state election: Kavel
Party	Candidate	Votes	%	±%
Liberal	Roger Goldsworthy	10,842	59.5	+2.5
Labor	Lance Jones	6,380	35.0	−3.0
Independent	Paul Reader	1,002	5.5	+5.5
Total formal votes		18,224	97.0	
Informal votes		555	3.0	
Turnout		18,779	93.5	
Two-party-preferred result
Liberal	Roger Goldsworthy	11,250	61.8	+1.8
Labor	Lance Jones	6,974	38.2	−1.8
Liberal hold		Swing	+1.8	

1982 South Australian state election: Kavel
Party	Candidate	Votes	%	±%
Liberal	Roger Goldsworthy	10,878	63.4	−5.4
Labor	Geoffrey Anderson	5,019	29.2	+7.0
Democrats	Brian Fain	1,261	7.4	−1.6
Total formal votes		17,158	95.2	−2.0
Informal votes		855	4.8	+2.0
Turnout		18,013	93.5	−0.3
Two-party-preferred result
Liberal	Roger Goldsworthy	11,452	66.7	−7.6
Labor	Geoffrey Anderson	5,706	33.3	+7.6
Liberal hold		Swing	−7.6	

=== Elections in the 1970s ===
1979 South Australian state election: Kavel
Party	Candidate	Votes	%	±%
Liberal	Roger Goldsworthy	11,248	68.8	+5.0
Labor	Sydney Tilmouth	3,626	22.2	−6.3
Democrats	Ivor Childs	1,464	9.0	+1.3
Total formal votes		16,338	97.2	−1.0
Informal votes		476	2.8	+1.0
Turnout		16,814	93.8	−0.6
Two-party-preferred result
Liberal	Roger Goldsworthy	12,143	74.3	+5.6
Labor	Sydney Tilmouth	4,195	25.7	−5.6
Liberal hold		Swing	+5.6	

1977 South Australian state election: Kavel
Party	Candidate	Votes	%	±%
Liberal	Roger Goldsworthy	10,260	63.8	+12.6
Labor	Sydney Tilmouth	4,589	28.5	+8.1
Democrats	Reginald Goldsworthy	1,244	7.7	+7.7
Total formal votes		16,093	98.2	
Informal votes		288	1.8	
Turnout		16,381	94.4	
Two-party-preferred result
Liberal	Roger Goldsworthy	11,064	68.7	−6.3
Labor	Sydney Tilmouth	5,029	31.3	+6.3
Liberal hold		Swing	−6.3	

1975 South Australian state election: Kavel
Party	Candidate	Votes	%	±%
Liberal	Roger Goldsworthy	5,292	52.4	−3.4
Liberal Movement	Roger Teusner	2,418	24.0	+24.0
Labor	Roy Hobden	1,854	18.4	−9.4
National	Eric Bartsch	477	4.7	−11.7
National	Harold Booth	50	0.5	+0.5
Total formal votes		10,091	97.6	−0.1
Informal votes		253	2.4	+0.1
Turnout		10,344	95.3	−0.7
Two-party-preferred result
Liberal	Roger Goldsworthy	7,942	78.7	+8.7
Labor	Roy Hobden	2,149	21.3	−8.7
Liberal hold		Swing	+8.7	

- The two candidate preferred vote was not counted between the Liberal and Liberal Movement candidates for Kavel.

1973 South Australian state election: Kavel
Party	Candidate	Votes	%	±%
Liberal and Country	Roger Goldsworthy	5,267	55.8	−9.6
Labor	Mark Eckermann	2,619	27.8	+27.8
National	Elmore Schulz	1,550	16.4	−18.2
Total formal votes		9,436	97.7	+6.5
Informal votes		221	2.3	−6.5
Turnout		9,657	96.0	−0.2
Two-party-preferred result
Liberal and Country	Roger Goldsworthy	6,605	70.0	+4.6
Labor	Mark Eckermann	2,831	30.0	+30.0
Liberal and Country hold		Swing	N/A	

1970 South Australian state election: Kavel
Party	Candidate	Votes	%	±%
Liberal and Country	Roger Goldsworthy	5,513	65.4	
National	Elmore Schulz	2,922	34.6	
Total formal votes		8,435	91.2	
Informal votes		810	8.8	
Turnout		9,245	96.2	
Liberal and Country hold		Swing		
