= Kavel =

Kavel is a surname. Notable people with this surname include:

- August Kavel (1798–1860), founder of Lutheranism in Australia
- George Kavel (1910–1995), American football player
- François Martin-Kavel (1846–1909), French painter and illustrator

== See also ==
- Electoral district of Kavel, single-member electoral district for the South Australian House of Assembly
- Electoral results for the district of Kavel in South Australian state elections
