= Hindmarsh Fire and Folk Museum =

History museum in South Australia

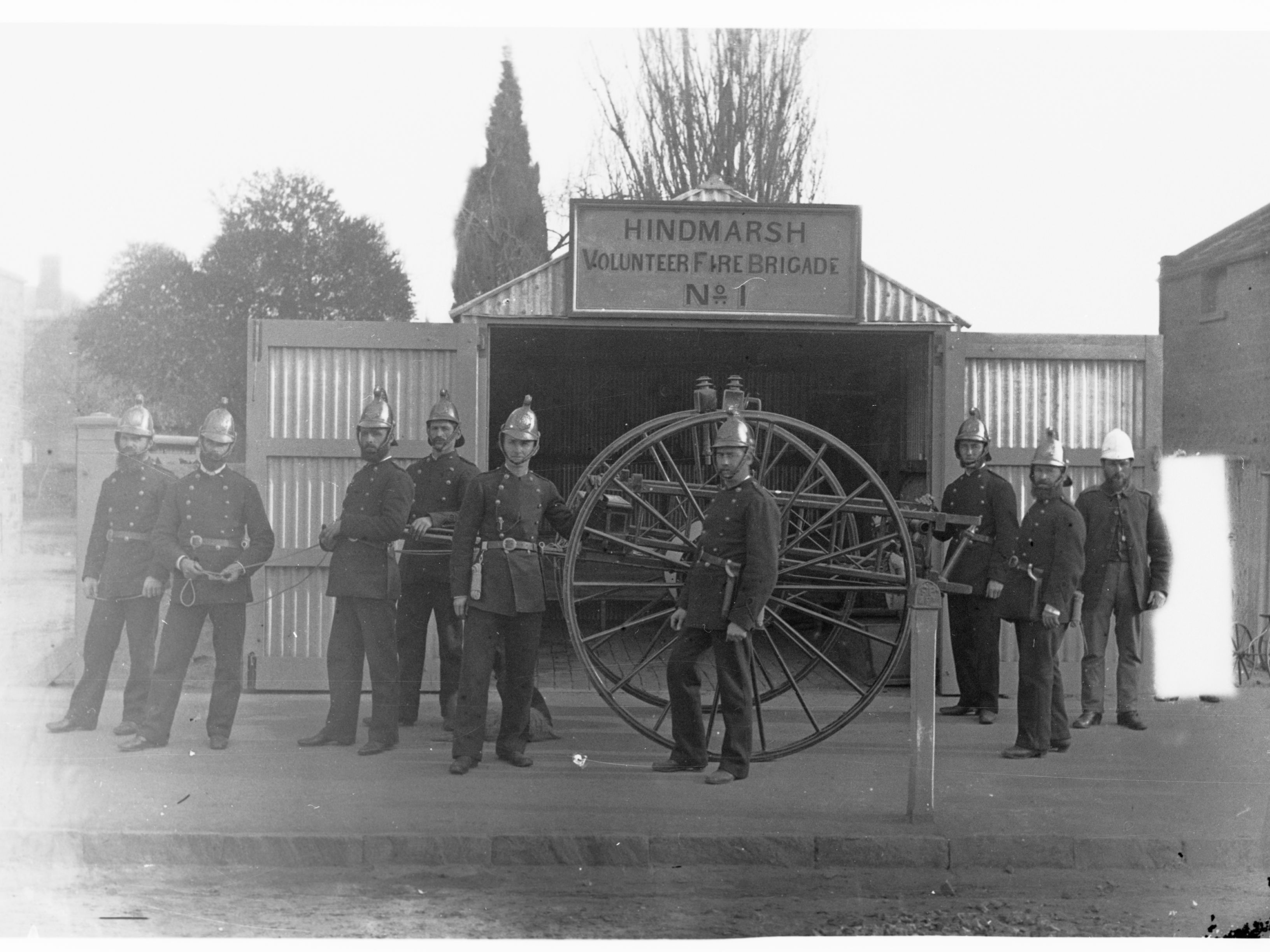
First firemen enrolled with the Hindmarsh Volunteer Fire Brigade in 1884, standing in front of their first station on the Port road, with the hand reel, which at that time was the only appliance owned by the brigade

The Hindmarsh Fire and Folk Museum is a history museum housed in a former fire station in Hindmarsh, South Australia.

It includes historical fire equipment and other artifacts from the former Hindmarsh Fire Brigade, dating back to the 1880s.

The building was a fire station from 1890 to 1925. According to the South Australia heritage register or whatever, "The congregation of the former Christian Chapel traced its roots to a small band of Christians, for a time presided over by Pastor Thomas Playford, patriarch of the Playford family, who erected a non-denominational Christian Chapel fronting Lindsay Circus (site of the soccer stadium) c.1845. The chapel was altered, possibly in the 1850s, but may incorporate parts of the original building. It was superseded by a new church across the street in 1876. While the building has been substantially altered it has important historical ties to the founding years of Hindmarsh village. The building was subsequently used as a school and meeting hall and by the Hindmarsh Volunteer Fire Brigade from 1890 to 1925, when they moved into a new building in front of it. The Metropolitan Fire Brigade used the buildings 1942-1957. The Hindmarsh Historical Society has occupied the site since 1969. The chapel is of most significance for its religious links with a relatively rare type of congregation and for dating from the earliest years of the Colony's first (1838) secondary town. Its siting on Lindsay Circus, intended to be the focus of the early village, is also significant. As at 1997, this building and its successor across the road are the only non-denominational chapels that are State Heritage Places. The 1925 Fire Brigade building is notable for its association with the State's longest serving volunteer fire brigade."

It has also been known as Hindmarsh Historical Society Museum.
