= Thomas Playford =

Thomas Playford may refer to:

- Thomas Playford I (1795–1873) a.k.a. Reverend Thomas Playford, non-conformist pioneer preacher in South Australia
- Thomas Playford II (1837–1915), Premier of South Australia, 1887–1889 and 1890–1892
- Thomas Playford IV (1896–1981), Premier of South Australia, 1938–1965

== See also ==
- Playford family
