= 1992 Kavel state by-election =

- 9 May 1992

Electoral district of Kavel in the South Australian House of Assembly
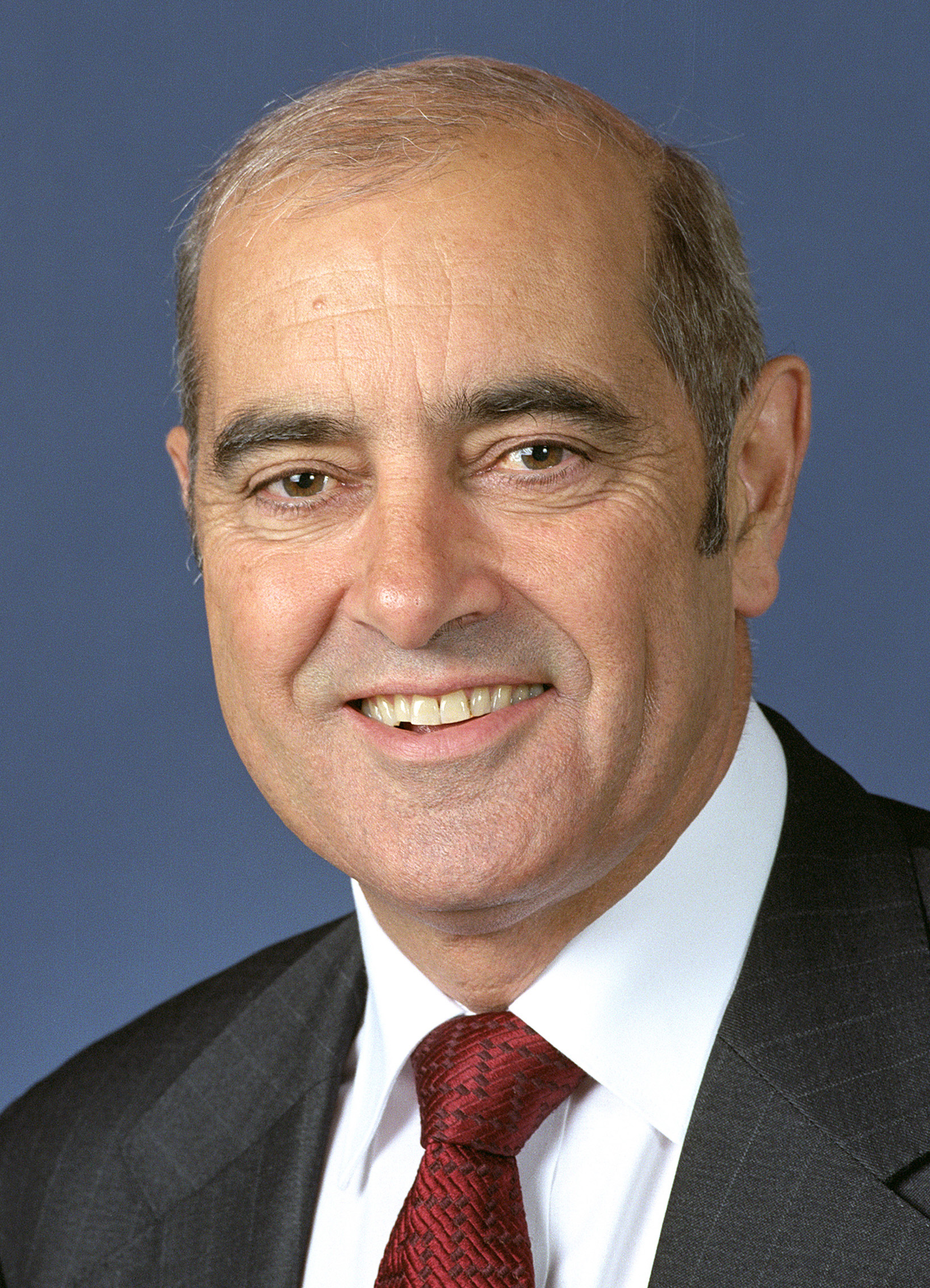

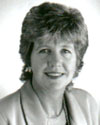
| | First party | Second party |
|---|---|---|
| | | DEM |
| Candidate | John Olsen | John Blundell |
| Party | Liberal | Democrats |
| Primary vote | 10,381 | 3,054 |
| Percentage | 53.4% | 15.7% |
| Swing | ▼53.4 | ▲2.7 |
| TCP | 61.7% | 38.3% |
| TCP swing | ▼3.8 | ▲38.3 |
| | Third party | Fourth party |
| | | AIA |
| Candidate | Lea Stevens | Graeme Watts |
| Party | Labor | Independent Alliance |
| Primary vote | 2,816 | 1,591 |
| Percentage | 14.5% | 8.2% |
| Swing | ▼11.6 | ▲8.2 |
MP before election
Roger Goldsworthy
Liberal
Elected MP
John Olsen
Liberal

A by-election was held for the South Australian House of Assembly seat of Kavel on 9 May 1992. This was triggered by the resignation of former state Liberal deputy premier Roger Goldsworthy. The seat had been retained by the Liberals since it was created and first contested at the 1970 state election. The by-election was held on the same day as the Alexandra by-election.

== Results ==
Call to Australia, who contested the previous election and gained 5.1 percent, did not contest the by-election. The Liberals retained the seat.

Kavel by-election, 9 May 1992
| Party | Candidate | Votes | % | ±% |
|---|---|---|---|---|
| Liberal | John Olsen | 10,381 | 53.4 | −2.4 |
| Democrats | John Blundell | 3,054 | 15.7 | +2.7 |
| Labor | Lea Stevens | 2,816 | 14.5 | −11.6 |
| Independent Alliance | Graeme Watts | 1,591 | 8.2 | +8.2 |
| Grey Power | Stan Batten | 1,127 | 5.8 | +5.8 |
| Independent | John Henderson | 457 | 2.4 | +2.4 |
| Total formal votes | | 19,426 | 96.4 | −1.4 |
| Informal votes | | 716 | 3.6 | +1.4 |
| Turnout | | 20,142 | 83.9 | −11.7 |
Two-candidate-preferred result
| Liberal | John Olsen | 11,989 | 61.7 | −3.8 |
| Democrats | John Blundell | 7,437 | 38.3 | +38.3 |
| Liberal hold | | | | |

== See also ==
- List of South Australian state by-elections
