= Hasan Hüseyin =

Hasan Hüseyin is a masculine name, a combination of the given names Hasan from Hasan ibn Ali and Hüseyin from Husayn ibn Ali, the assassinated grandsons of Muhammad and both sons of Ali. It may refer to:

- Hasan Hüseyin Acar (born 1994), Turkish footballer
- Hasan Hüseyin Kaçar (born 1988), Turkish Paralympian middle and long-distance runner
- Hasan Hüseyin Korkmazgil (born 1927), Turkish poet
