= John Olsen =

Australian politician

The Honourable John Olsen AO
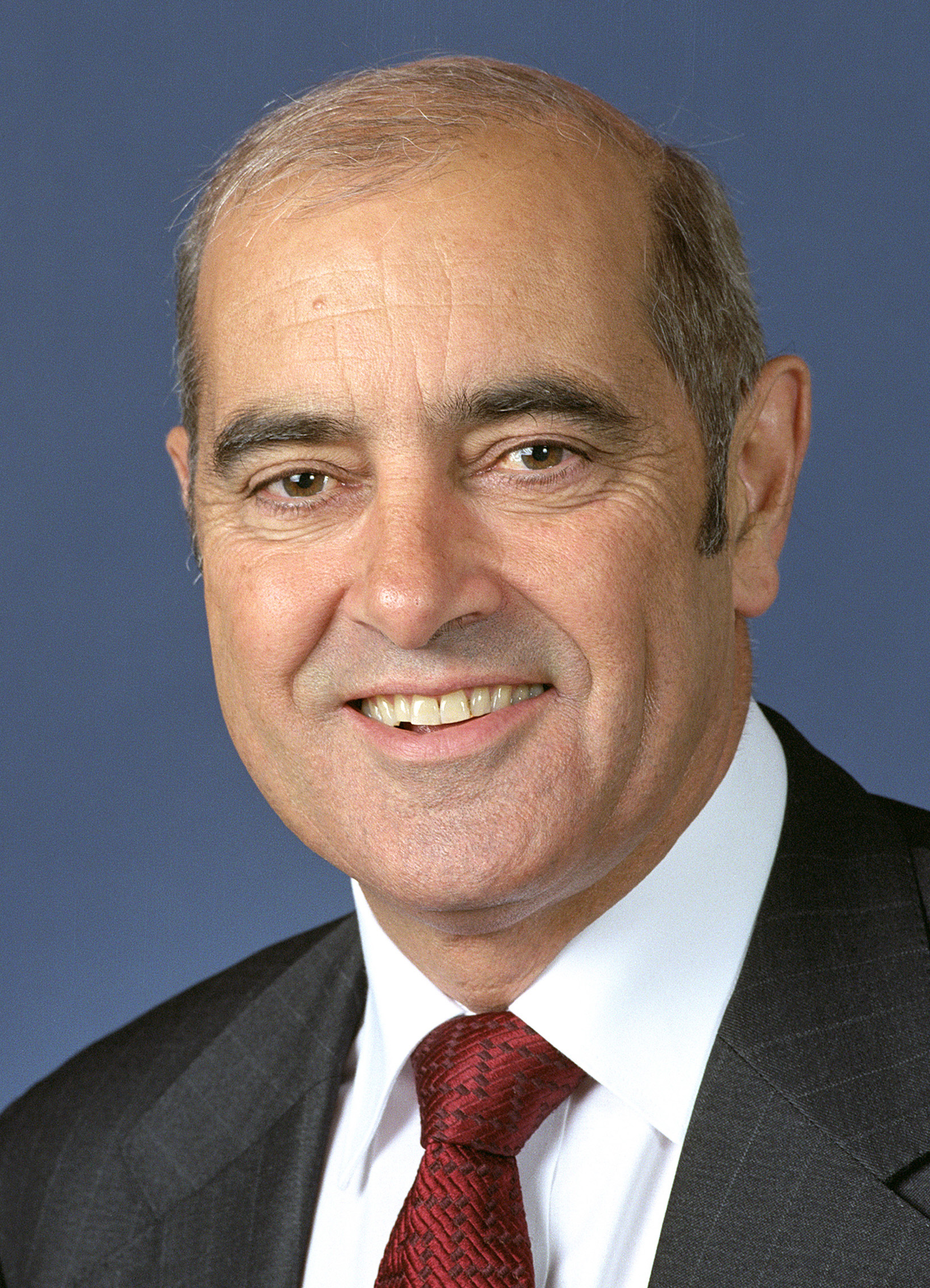

Premier of South Australia
- In office 28 November 1996 – 22 October 2001
- Monarch: Elizabeth II
- Governor: Sir Eric Neal
- Deputy: Graham Ingerson (1996–1998); Rob Kerin (1998–2001)
- Preceded by: Dean Brown
- Succeeded by: Rob Kerin

President of the Liberal Party of Australia
- In office 7 August 2020 – 29 May 2026
- Leader: Scott Morrison; Peter Dutton; Sussan Ley; Angus Taylor
- Preceded by: Nick Greiner
- Succeeded by: Tony Abbott

President of the South Australian Liberal Party
- In office 2 June 2017 – 27 September 2020
- Preceded by: Steve Murray
- Succeeded by: Legh Davis
- In office 1976–1979
- Preceded by: Trevor Griffin
- Succeeded by: Dr Jim Forbes

Senator for South Australia
- In office 7 May 1990 – 4 May 1992
- Preceded by: Tony Messner
- Succeeded by: Alan Ferguson

Leader of the Opposition in South Australia
- In office 10 November 1982 – 12 January 1990
- Deputy: Roger Goldsworthy
- Preceded by: John Bannon
- Succeeded by: Dale Baker

Leader of the South Australian Liberal Party
- In office 28 November 1996 – 22 October 2001
- Deputy: Graham Ingerson; Rob Kerin
- Preceded by: Dean Brown
- Succeeded by: Rob Kerin
- In office 10 November 1982 – 12 January 1990
- Deputy: Roger Goldsworthy
- Preceded by: David Tonkin
- Succeeded by: Dale Baker

Minister for Multicultural Affairs
- In office 28 November 1996 – 22 October 2001
- Premier: Himself
- Preceded by: Dean Brown
- Succeeded by: Rob Kerin

Minister for Infrastructure and Industry
- In office 14 December 1993 – 12 December 1996
- Premier: Dean Brown
- Preceded by: John Klunder
- Succeeded by: Graham Ingerson

Minister for Fisheries
- In office 5 March 1982 – 10 November 1982
- Premier: David Tonkin
- Preceded by: Allan Rodda
- Succeeded by: Chris Sumner

Member for Kavel
- In office 9 May 1992 – 9 February 2002
- Preceded by: Roger Goldsworthy
- Succeeded by: Mark Goldsworthy

Member for Custance
- In office 7 December 1985 – 6 May 1990
- Preceded by: Constituency Created
- Succeeded by: Ivan Venning

Member for Rocky River
- In office 15 September 1979 – 7 December 1985
- Preceded by: Howard Venning
- Succeeded by: Constituency Abolished

Mayor of Kadina
- In office 6 July 1974 – 2 July 1977
- Preceded by: Lloyd Davies
- Succeeded by: Graham Morphett

Alderman on the Kadina Council
- In office 14 May 1971 – 2 July 1977

Personal details
- Born: John Wayne Olsen; 7 June 1945 (age 81) Kadina, South Australia, Australia
- Party: Liberal Party of Australia (SA)

John Wayne Olsen AO (born 7 June 1945) is an Australian politician, diplomat and football commissioner. He was Premier of South Australia between 28 November 1996 and 22 October 2001.

Olsen was twice the parliamentary leader of the South Australian Division of the Liberal Party of Australia in the South Australian House of Assembly, from 1982 to 1990 and again from 1996 to 2001. He unsuccessfully led the party to both the 1985 election and 1989 election. After the 1989 election he left South Australian parliament to fill a casual vacancy in the Australian Senate. He returned to the South Australian parliament in 1992, but was defeated for the Liberal party leadership by Dean Brown.

However, in 1996, Olsen successfully challenged Brown for the Liberal leadership, and hence became Premier. He led the party to a narrow victory at the 1997 election, and remained Premier until 2001. He resigned in 2001, after he was found to have misled parliament during the Motorola affair. Olsen is the longest-serving Liberal Party of Australia Premier of South Australia and the fourth-longest-serving Leader of the Opposition.

After politics Olsen worked as a diplomat and political lobbyist. He became the State President of the South Australian Liberal Party in June 2017. He previously held that position from 1976 to 1979. He was appointed an Officer of the Order of Australia in January 2007.

More recently, he has been chairman of the Adelaide Football Club and deputy chairman of the Adelaide Oval Stadium Management Authority.

== Early life and education ==
John Wayne Olsen was born on 7 June 1945 in Kadina, South Australia.

When he was 18, his father suffered a fatal heart attack while driving the family speedboat. He attended Kadina Memorial High School, later completing a certificate in business studies at the University of Adelaide and becoming a fellow of the National Institute of Accountants.

Olsen began his working career in 1962 as a clerk with the Savings Bank of South Australia. He later became managing director of the family business J. R. Olsen & Sons Pty Ltd, a car and machinery dealer. He served as president of the Federation of Chambers of Commerce of South Australia from 1974 to 1976.

== Political career ==
Olsen was elected to the Kadina Town Council in 1971. He served as mayor from 1974 to 1977, reputedly "South Australia's youngest ever mayor". He was the final mayor before the town was merged into the District Council of Kadina.

In 1976, Olsen was elected president of the Liberal Party of Australia (South Australian Division), serving until 1979. He was first elected to the South Australian House of Assembly at the 1979 election as a Liberal in the Barossa Valley seat of Rocky River. He represented this seat, renamed Custance at the 1985 election, until 1990.

Olsen's political career was marked by a bitter rivalry with Dean Brown, the two representing the conservative and moderate wings of the South Australian Liberal Party respectively. After the 1982 election and the electoral defeat and retirement of David Tonkin, Olsen defeated Brown for the state Liberal Party leadership and became Leader of the Opposition. Up against the Labor premier John Bannon, Olsen lost both the 1985 election and 1989 election. In the latter election, the Liberals won a majority of the two-party vote (52 percent) with a five-seat swing. However, most of that majority was wasted on landslides in the Liberals' rural heartland. Even with the likely support of the one National Party MP, the Liberals were still one seat short of making Olsen Premier.

Olsen resigned as state Liberal leader soon after the election and returned to the backbench. He was appointed to the Australian Senate in 1990 to fill a casual vacancy caused by the resignation of Tony Messner.

However, in 1992, after less than two years in the Senate, he resigned to return to state politics. The Bannon government was under pressure from the collapse of the State Bank of South Australia. However, Olsen's successor as state Liberal leader, Dale Baker, was unable to gain significant ground. Baker resigned as state Liberal leader in 1992 and called a spill for all leadership positions, intending to hand the leadership back to Olsen as soon as he was securely back in the legislature. To facilitate this, former Deputy Premier Roger Goldsworthy, a leading member of the Liberals' right wing, resigned his seat of Kavel, based on Mount Barker, and handed it to Olsen. However, several members of the party's moderate wing were unwilling to see Olsen take the leadership uncontested. They arranged for leading party moderate Ted Chapman to give up his seat of Alexandra and hand it to Brown so Brown could challenge for the leadership. Olsen returned to the House of Assembly at the 1992 Kavel by-election, on the same day as Brown at the 1992 Alexandra by-election. This time, Brown narrowly defeated Olsen in the leadership ballot, and thus became premier when the Liberals won the 1993 election in a landslide where the Liberals won 37 of the 47 seats available, the most that any party has won since the abolition of the Playmander. Olsen became Minister for Industry and Minister for Infrastructure until 1997, when a cabinet reshuffle saw him become Minister for Information Technology and Minister for Multicultural and Ethnic Affairs.

Soon after taking office, Olsen led negotiations with Motorola to build a software centre in Adelaide. Motorola decided to open the centre in April after winning a number of incentives, including becoming the supplier for a government radio network, and a contract was signed in June. During a September Question Time, Olsen stated that there had been no discussions with Motorola about the radio contract. This statement would ultimately prove to be his undoing.

=== Premier (1996-2001) ===
By late 1996, however, the Liberals' poll numbers under Brown were stagnating in the face of factional battles and concerns about the slow pace of reform. With a statutory general election due in 1997, two prominent Liberal moderate backbenchers, Joan Hall (wife of former Premier Steele Hall) and Graham Ingerson (who had briefly served as Brown's deputy in Opposition), threw their support to Olsen. With Hall and Ingerson's support, Olsen challenged Brown for the party leadership in November 1996. This time, he succeeded and was sworn in as Premier, with Ingerson as his deputy.

During the ensuing 1997 election campaign, most commentators agreed that Olsen lost the leaders' debate against Labor's Mike Rann. The election was extremely close; on election night many Liberals feared that Labor had managed the 12-seat swing it needed to take back government (Labor had taken two Liberal seats at by-elections). Ultimately, the Liberals suffered a 9.4% swing and lost 11 seats, one short of making Rann Premier. Olsen was forced into a minority government supported by National and independent MPs. It was the first time that the main non-Labor party in South Australia had won a second term since adopting the Liberal Party label in 1974. After one of those crossbenchers, former Liberal Mitch Williams, returned to the party in December 1999, Olsen held a one-seat majority for eight months until he expelled longtime Liberal maverick Peter Lewis in July 2000.

==== Policies ====
Among a number of controversial policies, Olsen's government undertook the privatisation of the state-owned electricity industry (ETSA), partly to improve the government's parlous financial situation due to the State Bank disaster and partly in response to the introduction of the Australian National Electricity Market, despite promising not to do so at the 1997 election. The fiscal arguments for privatisation were vigorously criticised by a number of economists. Sharp increases in the retail price of electricity, a consequence of the working of the National Electricity Market, contributed to the growing unpopularity of the government. The management of the state's water supply was privatised in 1996 with a $1.5bn 15-year contract being awarded to United Water, a subsidiary of Veolia.

Olsen steered water management and conservation projects, including the recycling of water from Adelaide's Bolivar Water Treatment Plant to the Northern Adelaide Plains. He also endorsed and facilitated the Barossa Water Project, a water distribution scheme from the River Murray to the Barossa Valley floor, alleviating the Barossa Valley winegrowers' water irrigation problems and boosting annual production by $30 million.

While in office, he negotiated a $850 million "smart-city" redevelopment of Adelaide's northern suburban area (Mawson Lakes) and facilitated the contract negotiations and construction of the Adelaide-Darwin Rail line.

The Olsen government also secured major sporting events including the Tour Down Under cycling event and V8 Supercar Series. The Tour Down Under became an economic plus for South Australia, generating almost 40,000 visitors and $50 million in economic benefit during the annual event in 2015. The V8 Supercar series, later known as Clipsal 500 and then Adelaide 500, attracted in the years leading up to 2016.

Olsen pursued a vigorous program of economic reform through the corporatisation and privatisation of government services which included the single largest public outsourcing project of its kind at the time in the world – the outsourcing of the State's water industry, a contract which included the establishment of a private sector water industry.

==== Resignation ====
In 1998, an inquiry was established into the process of bringing the technology company Motorola to South Australia. The first report prepared by former chief magistrate Jim Cramond cleared Olsen of any wrongdoing. A second report prepared by Dean Clayton, QC, found Olsen had misled parliament, and also found that Olsen had made representations to Cramond that were labelled "misleading and inaccurate", "dishonest" and had "no factual basis". Olsen denied any wrongdoing, saying "...I absolutely refute Mr Clayton's assertion. The report clearly indicates there are no criminal activities, no illegal activities." Nonetheless, amid speculation that he would face a leadership challenge, he resigned as Premier on 10 October 2001. He did not stand for re-election in 2002.

Following the Clayton report, the matter was referred to the Director of Public Prosecutions, Paul Rofe, QC. The Director of Public Prosecutions found no illegal activity and disagreed with some of the findings from the Clayton report. Olsen claimed he was vindicated, noting that two out of three reports had cleared him of any wrongdoing. In 2018 Olsen stated that "I note that the standard I applied to myself at the time seems to have disappeared from modern politics.”

=== Liberal Party presidency ===
On 24 May 2017 Olsen announced that he had been asked to stand for the position of state president of the SA Liberals at a party vote on 16 June with cross-factional support, after incumbent Steve Murray stood down from the position on 23 May to contest Davenport at the 2018 state election. Olsen was successful. He had previously served as state president in 1979, before giving up the post to enter parliament. Olsen stepped down from this role in September 2020. Prior to becoming Liberal Party president, Olsen was a registered political lobbyist and had worked with Bespoke Approach as a special advisor.

In 2020, Olsen was elected President of the Federal Liberal Party. He was elected unopposed, with the support of Prime Minister Scott Morrison.

== Consul-General in Los Angeles and New York ==
Olsen was appointed by the Howard government as Australian Consul-General to Los Angeles. On 7 December 2005, his Liberal Party colleague and fellow South Australian, Australian Foreign Minister, Alexander Downer announced that Olsen would become the new Australian Consul-General in New York.

Olsen started G'Day USA in 2004, a week-long program showcasing the best of Australia. The program expanded to New York in 2007 and has become the largest annual foreign country promotion in the United States.

== After politics ==
=== Football administration ===
Olsen was appointed chairman of the South Australian Football Commission in 2010. He played a role in the negotiations to move football from Football Park to Adelaide Oval. He served as president of the South Australian National Football League (SANFL) from 2014 to 2020. He is a life member of the West Adelaide Football Club with whom he was the number-one ticket holder for 17 years.

Olsen has been deputy chairman of the Adelaide Oval Stadium Management Authority.

On 13 October 2020 Olsen was announced as the chairman of the board of directors of the Adelaide Football Club, one of two Adelaide-based professional Australian rules football clubs participating in the Australian Football League (AFL).

=== Other roles ===
Olsen was president of the Federal Liberal Party from 7 August 2020 to 29 May 2026, chairman of the Australian American Association from 30 November 2015 to 3 March 2023..

== Personal life ==
Olsen married Julie Abbott in 1968, with whom he has two sons and a daughter.

Political offices
Preceded by John Bannon	Leader of the Opposition in South Australia; 1982–1990	Succeeded by Dale Baker
Preceded by Dean Brown	Premier of South Australia; 1996–2001	Succeeded by Rob Kerin
Parliament of South Australia
Preceded by Howard Venning	Member for Rocky River; 1979–1985	District abolished
New district	Member for Custance; 1985–1990	Ivan Venning
Preceded by Roger Goldsworthy	Member for Kavel; 1992–2002	Succeeded by Mark Goldsworthy
Party political offices
Preceded by David Tonkin	Leader of the Liberal Party of Australia (South Australian Division); 1982–1990	Succeeded by Dale Baker
Preceded by Dean Brown	Leader of the Liberal Party of Australia (South Australian Division); 1996–2001	Succeeded by Rob Kerin
Diplomatic posts
Preceded by Allan Rocher	Australian Consul-General in Los Angeles; 2002–2006	Succeeded by Innes Willox
Preceded by Ken Allen	Australian Consul General in New York; 2006–2009	Succeeded by Phil Scanlan
