= Gazi Eğitim Enstitüsü =

Gazi Eğitim Enstitüsü Gazi Institute for Education
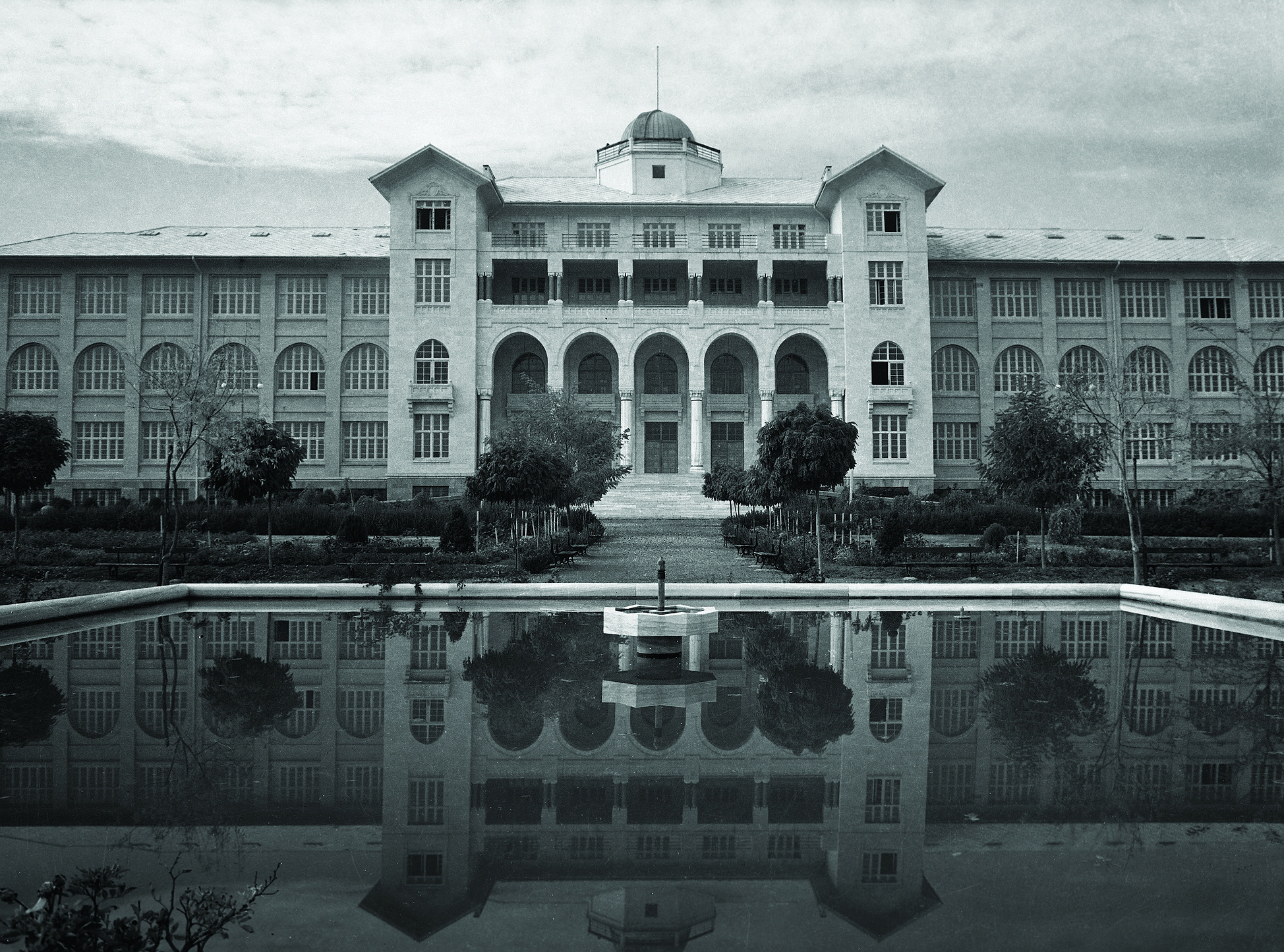
- Gazi Institute for Education building in Ankara, today Rectorate Building of Gazi University.

Location
- Yenimahalle, Ankara; Turkey
- Coordinates: 39°56′22″N 32°49′20″E

Information
- Former names: Orta Muallim Mektebii ve Terbiye Enstitüsü; Gazi Orta Muallim Mektebi ve Terbiye Enstitüsü
- Opened: 1927
- Closed: 1982
- Gender: Mixed

Gazi Eğitim Enstitüsü (literally: Gazi Institute for Education) was a teacher's college in Ankara, Turkey. Established in 1927, it was incorporated in the Gazi University as the Gazi Faculty of Education in 1982.

== Secondary education in Turkey ==
Enacted in the Ottoman Empire in 1913, the "Temporary Law on Elementary Education" (Ottoman Turkish: Tedrisat-ı İptidaiye Kanun-u Muvakkati, Turkish: Geçici İlköğretim Yasası) added secondary schools (Ottoman Turkish: Rüştiye, Turkish: Orta okul) to the six-year lasting primary education. In 1924, right after the proclamation of the Republic, the primary education was shortened to five years, and apart from this a three-year secondary education was established. With other words, the secondary schools, closed in 1913, were re-established. In this way, the general education system was regulated as five-year primary school, three-year secondary school and three-year high school.

== Teacher's schools ==
The "Law on the Organization of Education" (Turkish: Maarif Teşkilatına Dair Kanun), enacted on 22 March 1926, provided for the establishment of teacher's schools as primary teacher's schools, village teacher's schools, middle teacher's schools and high teacher's schools. From 1927 on, kindergarten teacher's schools and vocational teacher's schools were added. In the 1974–75 term, primary teacher's schools were closed. Teachers of primary schools were educated two years instead as class teachers in institutes for education. The number of those tootled to 49 in the 1977–78 term.

The graduates of the middle teacher's schools could serve as teacher in the primary schools, village schools and secondary schools, as primary education inspector as well as head teacher in primary schools.

== Gazi Institute for Education ==
The Gazi Institute for Education was established under the name "Orta Muallim Mektebii ve Terbiye Enstitüsü" (literally: Middle Teacher's School and Education Institute) starting its education only in the Turkish language and Literature field with 16 boarding students in Ankara on 1 March 1927. In 1929, its name was changed to "Gazi Orta Muallim Mektebi ve Terbiye Enstitüsü" in honor to President Mustafa Kemal Atatürk 's (in office 1923–1938) honorific title "Gazi". The institution was renamed to "“Gazi Eğitim Enstitüsü" in 1976. It was incorporated into Gazi University in 1982.

In the following years of foundation, other branches were added. So, to the Pedagogy in the 1927–28 term, History-Geography, Mathematics, Physics-Chemistry-Biology in the 19331 term, Drawing-Handcraft, Physical Education in the 1932–33 term, Music in the 1937–38 term, French language in the 1941–43 term, English language in the 1944–45 term, Combined Lessons in the 1946–47 term and German language in the 1947–48 term were added. The Special education branch was closed in 1955, and its function was incorporated into the Pedagogy branch. In the 1967–68 term, the duration of branches with two year were increased to three years.

Beginning with 1944, institutes for education were opened also in other cities of the country. Those institutes were Ankara-Gazi, Istanbul-Atatürk, Balıkesir-Neacti, İzmir-Buca, Bursa, Konya-Selçuk, Samsun, Trabzon-Fatih, Erzurum-Kazım Karabekir, Eskişehir, Adana, Uşak, Edirne, Isparta, Gaziantep, Hatay, Diyarbakır and Nazilli. However, their number of branches were generally less than of Gazi Institute for Education. In the 1977–78 term, the total number of branches were 18.

== Campus ==
At its foundation, the institution was temporarily housed in the building of closed religious orders in Konya because there was no suitable building in Ankara. The following year, it moved into the recently completed building of the Ministry of National Education in Ankara. One year later in 1928, the Ministry of National Education was moved to the evacuated building of Ankara Male Teacher's School of Primary Education. Its original new building was assigned to the Ministry of Foreign Affairs to host the King of Afghanistan Amanullah Khan (reigned 1926–1929) with his spouse during his state visit to Turkey as the guest of Mustafa Kemal ATatürk. The Middle Teacher's School (Turkish: Orta Öğretmen Okulu), as the institution was called at that time, was moved to the insufficient building of the Ministry of Foreign Affairs. The building of "Child Protection Corporation" (Turkish: Çocuk Esirgeme Kurumu) was then used as a dormitory for the boarding students.

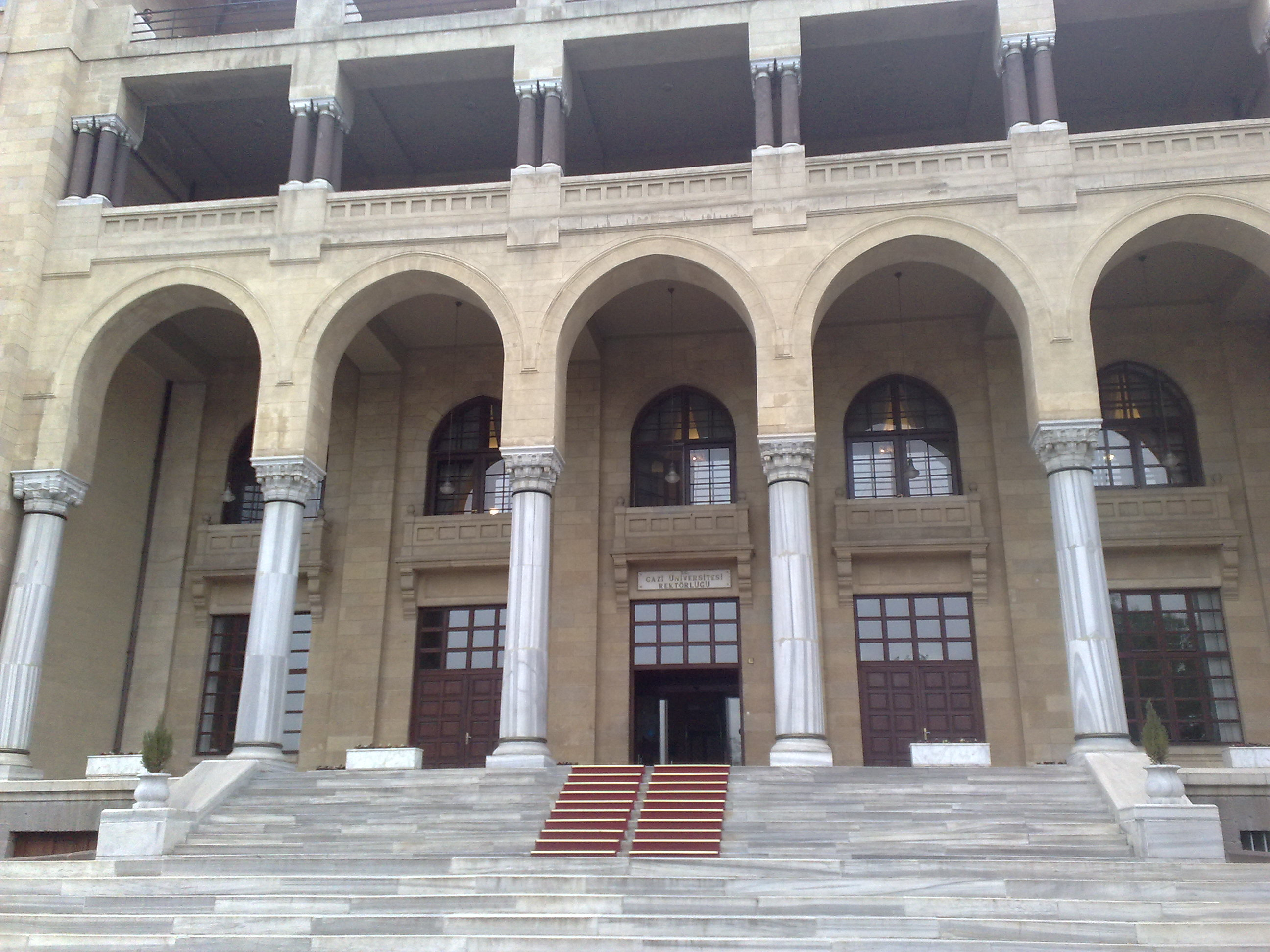
Detail from the Gazi Eğitim Enstitüsü building, today the Rectorate of Gazi University.

With the initiative of Minister of National Education Mustafa Necati (in office 1925–1929), a building was built on a land covering 360 daa (430,000 sq yd) purchased from the Atatürk Forest Farm to a symbolic price. The building was designed by the architect, Mimar Kemaleddin (1870–1927), as his latest work. It was designed in the style of First national architectural movement, which combines classical elements of Ottoman and Anatolian Seljuk architecture in the construction of modern buildings. At the groundbreaking ceremony, it was decided that the name of the institution to be prefixed with "Gazi" after the inauguration of the building. Completed in two and half years, the construction cost 1.746 million Turkish lira. As a comparison, the budget of the Ministry of National Education was about 8–10 million Turkish lira at that time. The building was designed to house 500 boarding students. The campus was located around 4 km (2.5 mi) far from the city center Ulus in an arid landscape. The highly needed landscaping was carried out by planting of vegetation after drilling of artesian aquifers. In later years, buildings for physical education (1932–36) and music (1937–38) were added. So the gym, designed by Austrian-Swiss architect Ernst Arnold Egli (1893–1974) and opened in 1930. After 1960, buildings, which spoiled the characteristics of the main building's architecture, were added with American aid.

In 1982, the buildings at the campus were passed over to the newly established Gazi University. The main building became the Rectorate of the university.

== Staff ==
Gazi Eğitim Enstitüsü was the second higher education institution in Ankara founded in the newly proclaimed Republic after the Law School. It was a favorite educational institutor with its selected executives, faculty and students as it bore in its name the prefix "Gazi", the honorific title of Atatürk. In the 1929–30 term, the faculty consisted of three professors, six lecturers with doctor's degree from abroad, one of them a foreigner, and some other lecturers, who were educated abroad or rose to prominence in their career.

== Recruiting students ==
Gazi Eğitim Enstitüsü was a mixed-sex education and boarding-only institution from the beginning. In later years, few day students were allowed for some branches. Applicants for the physical education branch had to be younger than 25 years of age, for all other branches not older than 30 years of age. No married women students were allowed until the boarding was abolished in 1973. Boarding students were enjoined to compulsory service for the period of one and half times of the duration of their education.

Until the mid-1970s, the vast majority of the students of the institute were graduates of primary teacher's schools or village institutes. Additionally, graduates of general high schools were also admitted in limited numbers. Selection of the candidates took place through a multi-stage hard exam. Those students were coming from families in need or low-income of socioeconomic status.

Almost all of the students in the branches Drawing-Handcraft, Music and Physical Education were graduates of primary teacher's schools or village institutes, which had wide opportunities for sports. High school graduates were in general not trained at the level to fulfill the requirements, they rather preferred the branches Mathematics, Science, Literature or Social Sciences. Most of the students in the Turkish language-Literature branch were also graduates of primary teacher's schools or village institutes. Admittance to the branches Pedagogy or Special Education were only for primary school teachers with at least three years of service.

== Graduates ==
During its activity, Gazi Eğitim Enstitüsü educated more than 30,000 middle school teachers qualified in their branch, primary school inspectors and school heads. In the early 1960s, almost all of the province directors of national education were graduates of the institute, particularly from the Pedagogy branch. All of the primary school inspectors with diploma and 24 of the 31 village institute directors appointed until 1946 were graduates of the institute. Personnel, who served between 1950 and 2000 in the central organization of the Ministry of National Education were graduates of the Gazi Institute or other similar teacher's colleges. Graduates of the institute contributed quite much to the universities during the higher educational restructuring in 1922, 1946 and 1982. More than half of the 94 notable Turkish writers born after 1900, which are listed in the Edebiyatımızda Yazarlar Sözlüğü ("Dictionary of Writers in Our Literature") by Behçet Necatigil (1916–1979), were graduates of Gazi Institute.

== Notable faculty ==
- Muzaffer Şerif Başoğlu (1906–1988), Psychology
- Sadi Irmak (1904–1990), Law
- Ali Fuat Başgil (1893–1967), Law
- Ahmet Hamdi Tanpınar (1901–1962), Literature
- Sabri Esat Siyavuşgil (1907–1968), Literature
- Eduard Zuckmayer (1890–1972), Music

== Notable alumni ==
- Fatma Refet Angın (1915–2010), the first female high school teacher of the Republican era. She was awarded Turkey's Teacher of the Year title in 1981
- Fakir Baykurt (1929–1999), writer and trade unionist
- Rıfat Ilgaz (1911–1993), writer and poet
- Hasan Hüseyin Korkmazgil (1927–1984), collectivist-realist poet.
- İsmet Kür (1916–2013), female educator, journalist, columnist and writer of mainly children's literature
- Mustafa Üstündağ (1933–1983), school teacher, politician and former government minister
- Metin Yurdanur (born 1952), school teacher and sculptor, who was awarded the title State Artist of Turkey.
