= Hasan Hüseyin Korkmazgil =

Turkish poet

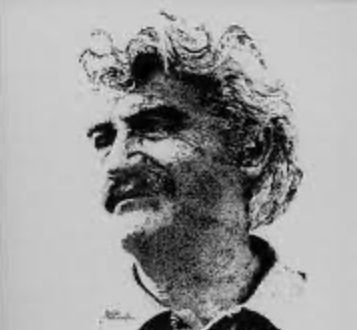
- Born: 4 March 1927; Gürün, Sivas, Turkey
- Died: 26 February 1984 (aged 56); Ankara, Turkey
- Resting place: Karşıyaka Cemetery, Ankara, Turkey
- Education: Gazi Eğitim Enstitüsü
- Occupations: Poet, writer, teacher, Journalist
- Spouse: Azime Korkmazgil
- Children: Temmuz Korkmazgil
- Writing career
- Period: 1963–1984

Hasan Hüseyin Korkmazgil or Hasan Hüseyin (4 March 1927 – 26 February 1984) was a leading Turkish socialist realist poet. He was born in Gürün, Sivas Province, Turkey.

== Early life and education ==
He attended Niğde Elementary School and graduated from Adana High School for Boys in 1948. He entered the Gazi Eğitim Enstitüsü Department of Literature as a boarding student. There, he took Turkish language classes from Mustafa Nihat Özön. In 1950, he was appointed as a teacher to the districts of Afşin and Göksun in Kahramanmaraş where he was dismissed for participating in political activities. He was arrested and imprisoned in 1951.

Hasan Hüseyin Korkmazgil was tried at the Elbistan High Criminal Court under Articles 141 and 142 of the Constitution. As a result of the trial, he was sentenced to seven months and twenty-five days of imprisonment, along with a ban on his civil rights. Consequently, he fulfilled his mandatory military service as a private over the course of two years.

Between the late 1950s and 1960, Korkmazgil resided in Sivas and Gürün for approximately nine years. During this period, he sustained himself through various occupations, including working as a petition writer, sign painter, litigator, and painter. Despite these demanding circumstances, he remained committed to his literary pursuits, continuing to write poetry, humorous short stories, and radio plays. His satirical writings were published in the magazines Karikatür and Taş Karikatür.

Following the military coup of May 27, 1960, Korkmazgil relocated to Ankara, where he began working as a journalist. On June 11, 1964, he married Azime Karabulut, a literature teacher at Uşak High School. The couple later welcomed a son, whom they named Temmuz.

== Works ==
Hasan Hüseyin, a distinguished literary figure, authored a total of 26 published works encompassing various genres, including poetry, short stories, travel writing, children’s literature, and compilations. Among these, fifteen are collections of poetry, five are children’s novels, three consist of political humor stories, one is a compilation of travel notes, and two are dedicated to preserving the writings and poems of his close friend, Bedrettin Cömert.

Hasan Hüseyin Korkmazgil, a poet deeply rooted in the struggles and realities of the people, spent his life among them, and this connection is vividly reflected in his art and poetry. Primarily recognized for his poetic works, Korkmazgil drew inspiration from the everyday lives, language, and traditions of the people.

In addition to poetry, he also authored short stories that bear similarities to those of his close friend Aziz Nesin, marked by a sophisticated use of language and a sharp sense of irony. His literary output is notably influenced by the principles of socialist literature and reveals a deep engagement with the rich cultural heritage of Anatolia.

Korkmazgil’s poems often center on the hardships endured by the Anatolian people, capturing the emotional weight of their struggles and the harshness of their living conditions. Through his work, he gave voice to the experiences of the marginalized, combining artistic finesse with a powerful social conscience.

Hasan Hüseyin started to write poems in his youth and his first poem, Ağustos Şiiri (August Poem), was published in the review Dost in 1959. His poetry became famous with its notable goodwill, wisdom and social stance and touched on themes varying from social and political problems to pain and hope within life Afterwards, he wrote for the reviews Dost (1959–66), Yelken (1959–64), Varlık (1960), İmece (1961), Ataç (1962–63), Yön (1962) and Sosyal Adalet (1963-65). His humorous short stories were also published in these years. He won the 1964 Yeditepe Poetry Prize with his book Kavel (Shepard’s Pipe), the Turkish Radio and Television Corporation Art Achievement Award in 1970 with Kızılkuğu (The Red Swan, 1971) and the Toprak and Nevzat Üstün Poetry Award in 1981 with Filizkıran Fırtınası (The Bud-Breaking Storm, 1981).

== Books ==
- Kavel (1963)
- Temmuz Bildirisi (1965)
- Kızılırmak (1966)
- Kızılkuğu (1971)
- Ağlasun Ayşafağı (1972)
- Oğlak (1972)
- Acıyı Bal Eyledik (1973).
- Kelepçemin Karasında Bir Ak Güvercin (1974)
- Koçero Vatan Şiiri (1976)
- Haziran'da Ölmek Zor (1977)
- Filizkıran Fırtınası (1981)
- Acılara Tutunmak (1981)
- Işıklarla Oynamayın (1982)
- Tohumlar Tuz İçinde (1988)
- Kandan Kına Yakılmaz (1989)
