= Misleading of parliament =

Illicit act by a government minister in the Westminster system

The misleading of parliament is the knowing presentation of false information to parliament, a very serious charge in Westminster system parliamentary assemblies. By convention, government ministers who are found to have misled parliament will generally lose their ministerial portfolio. For example, the Scottish Ministerial Code requires ministers to resign if they mislead the Scottish Parliament. For witnesses giving testimony to an Australian parliamentary committee, giving misleading evidence can be considered a contempt of parliament.

== Notable instances ==
=== Australia ===
- Motorola affair: John Olsen, Premier of South Australia, was forced to resign after misleading parliament.

=== United Kingdom ===
In 1994 the UK parliament's Treasury & Civil Service Committee noted that "the knowledge that ministers and civil servants may evade questions and put the best gloss on the facts but will not lie or knowingly mislead the House of Commons is one of the most powerful tools MPs have in holding the executive to account". The committee argued that any minister who was discovered to have knowingly lied to parliament should resign. Intentionally misleading parliament could result in being held in contempt of parliament; however, it is unclear what penalties there would be. The UK parliament has not levied a fine since 1666. As a result, Channel 4 found that "It's easier to get thrown out of the House of Commons for calling someone a liar than for lying itself."

- Profumo affair: John Profumo, Secretary of State for War. His affair with Christine Keeler, the reputed mistress of an alleged Soviet spy, followed by lying in the House of Commons when he was questioned about it, forced the resignation of Profumo and damaged the reputation of Prime Minister Harold Macmillan's government.
- Johnson affair: Boris Johnson, UK Prime Minister. On March 5, 2021, a court order showed that Prime Minister Boris Johnson "misled parliament over coronavirus contracts". Subsequently, the leaders of six opposition parties represented in parliament accused him of "a consistent failure to be honest".

In 2021, a petition to make knowingly lying to parliament a criminal offence obtained more than 100,000 signatures. The UK government announced that it does not plan to do so.
