= François Martin-Kavel =

François Martin-Kavel (May 25, 1846 or 1861/1862 - 1909 or 1931) was a French genre and still life painter and illustrator, born in Paris and lived in Neuilly-sur-Seine. He is known for his portraits of women, often in exotic costumes or undress. He debuted and regularly exhibited at the Salon des Artistes Français; he was awarded a medal for his work in 1881.

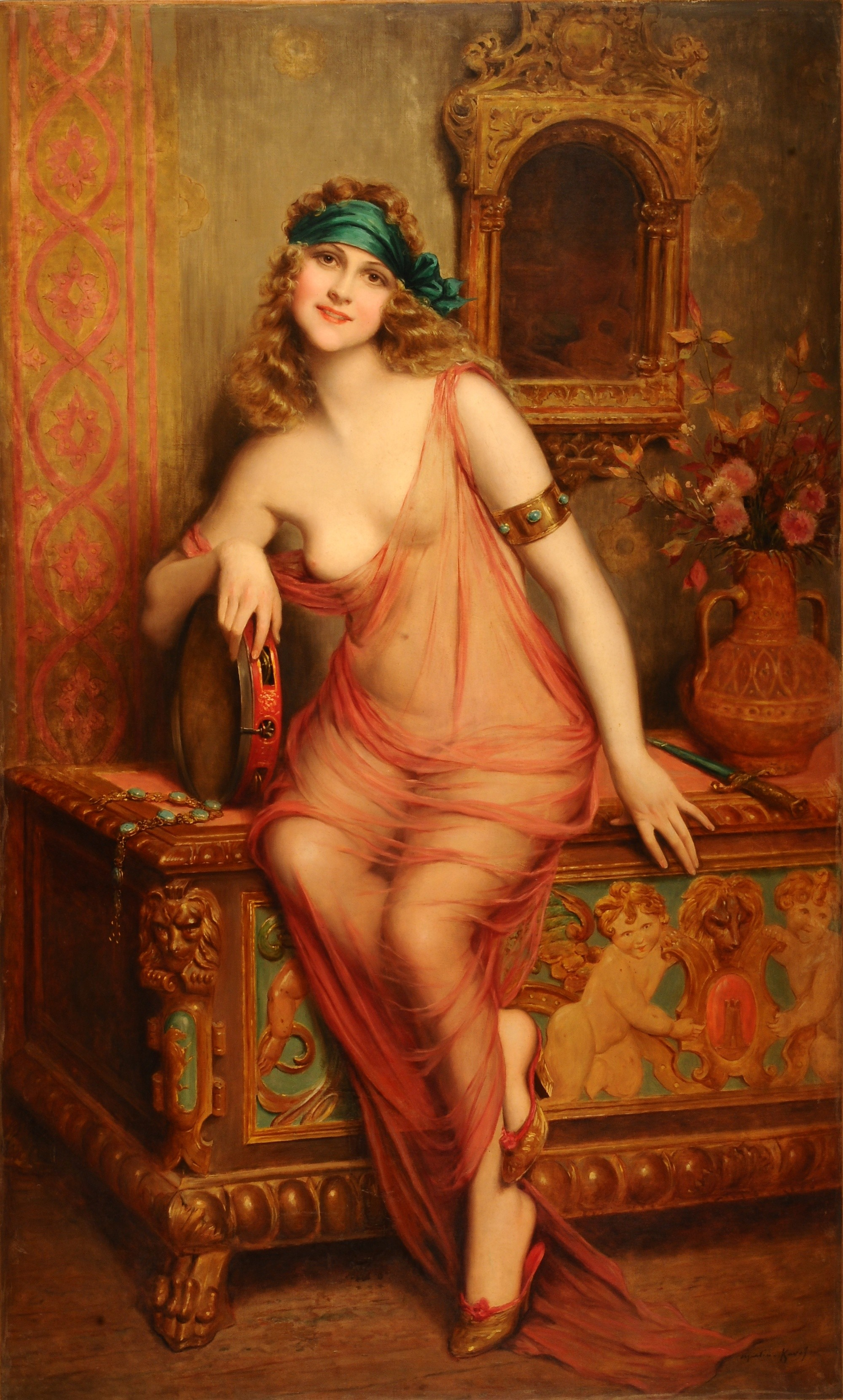
Danseuse (Bailarina)

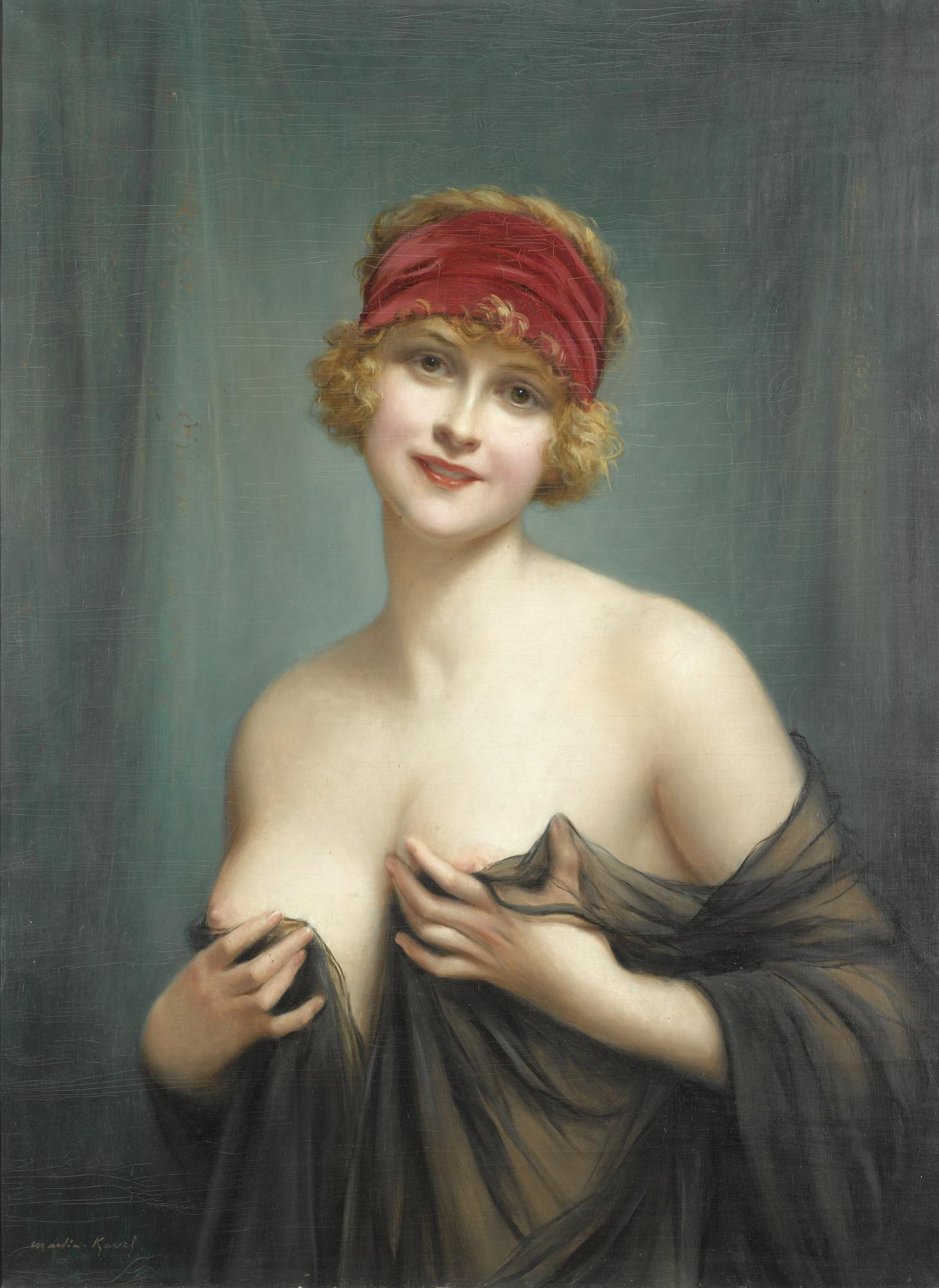
Jeune Femme En Déshabillé

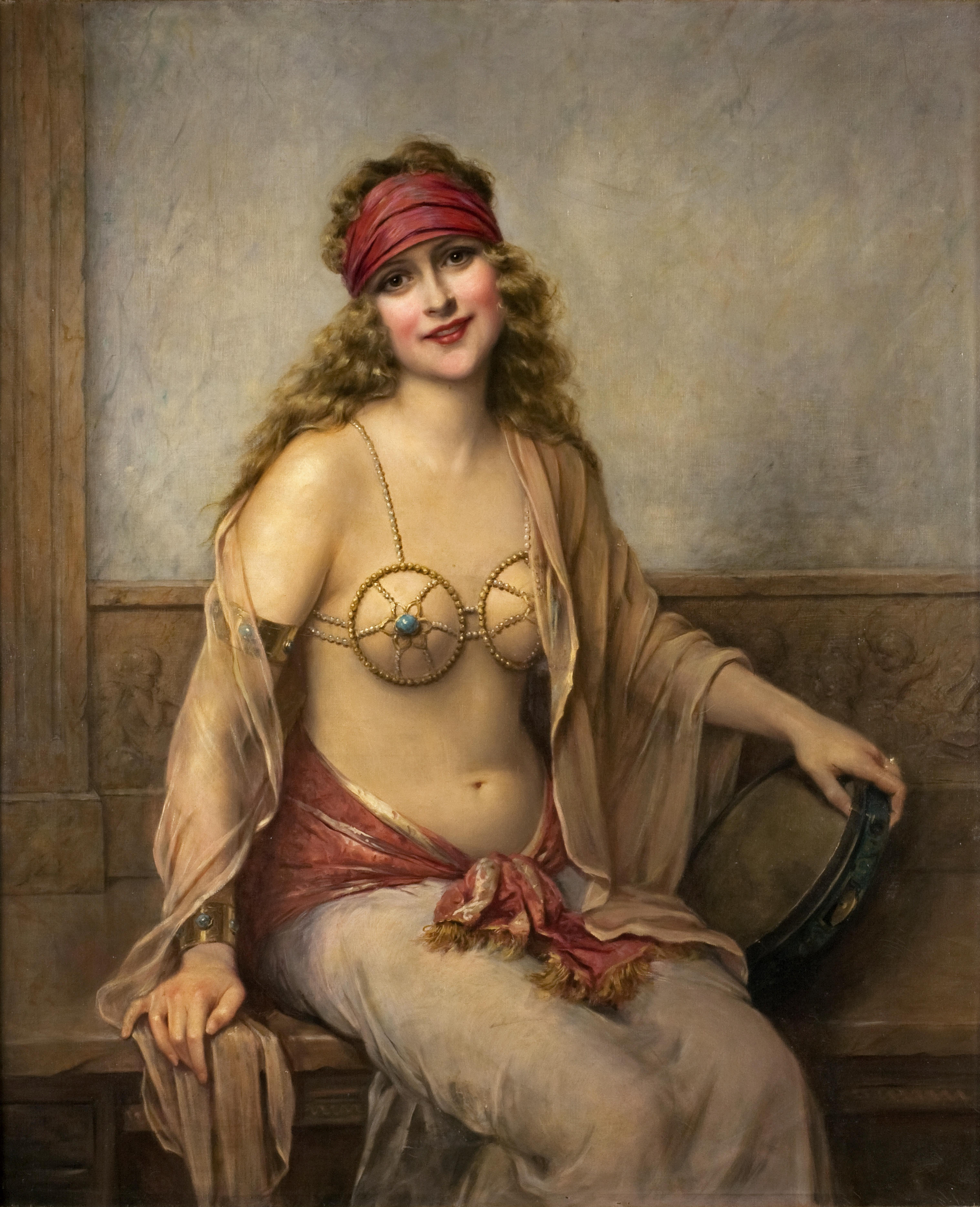
L'odalisque

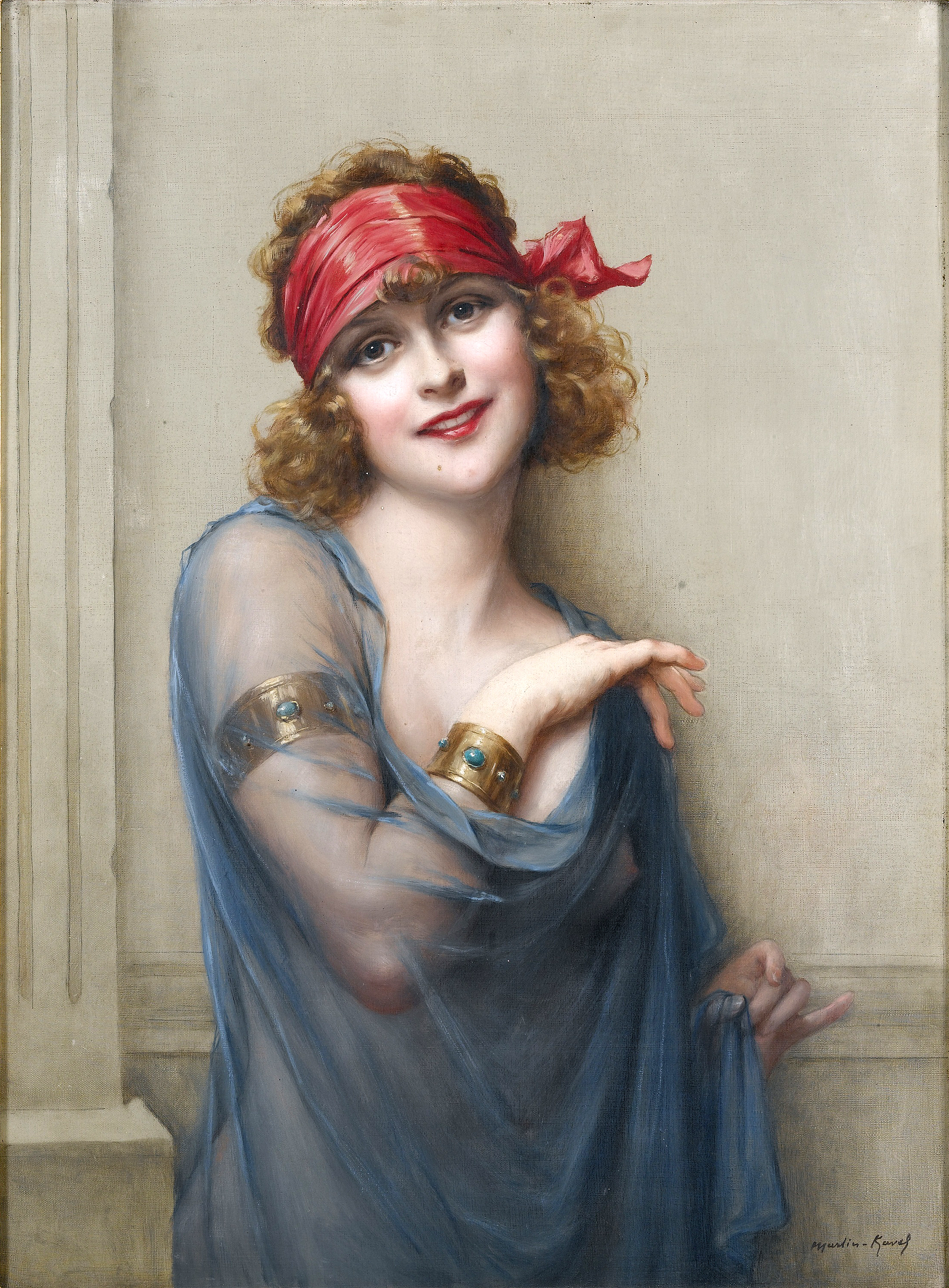
Le voile bleu

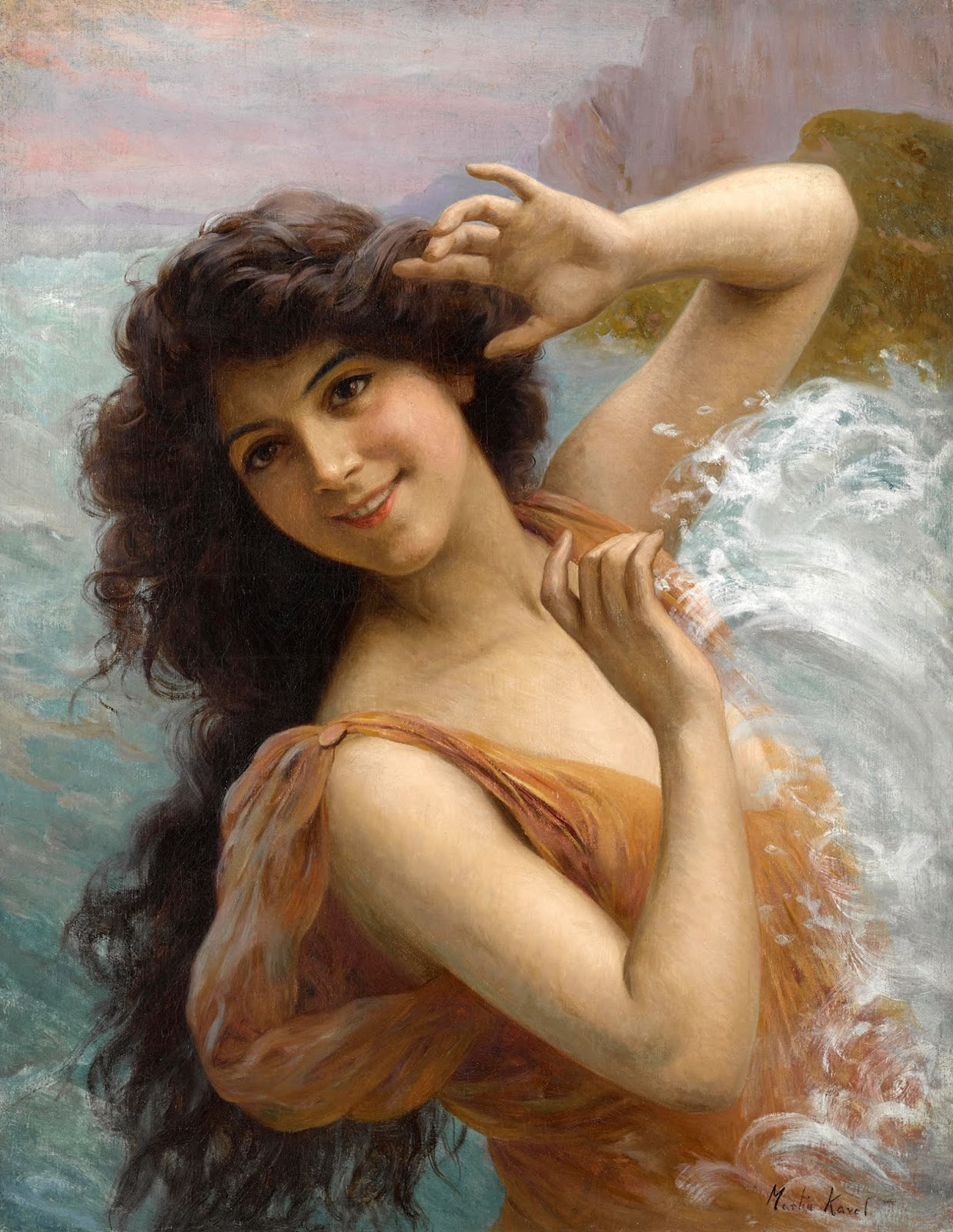
La nymphe d'eau

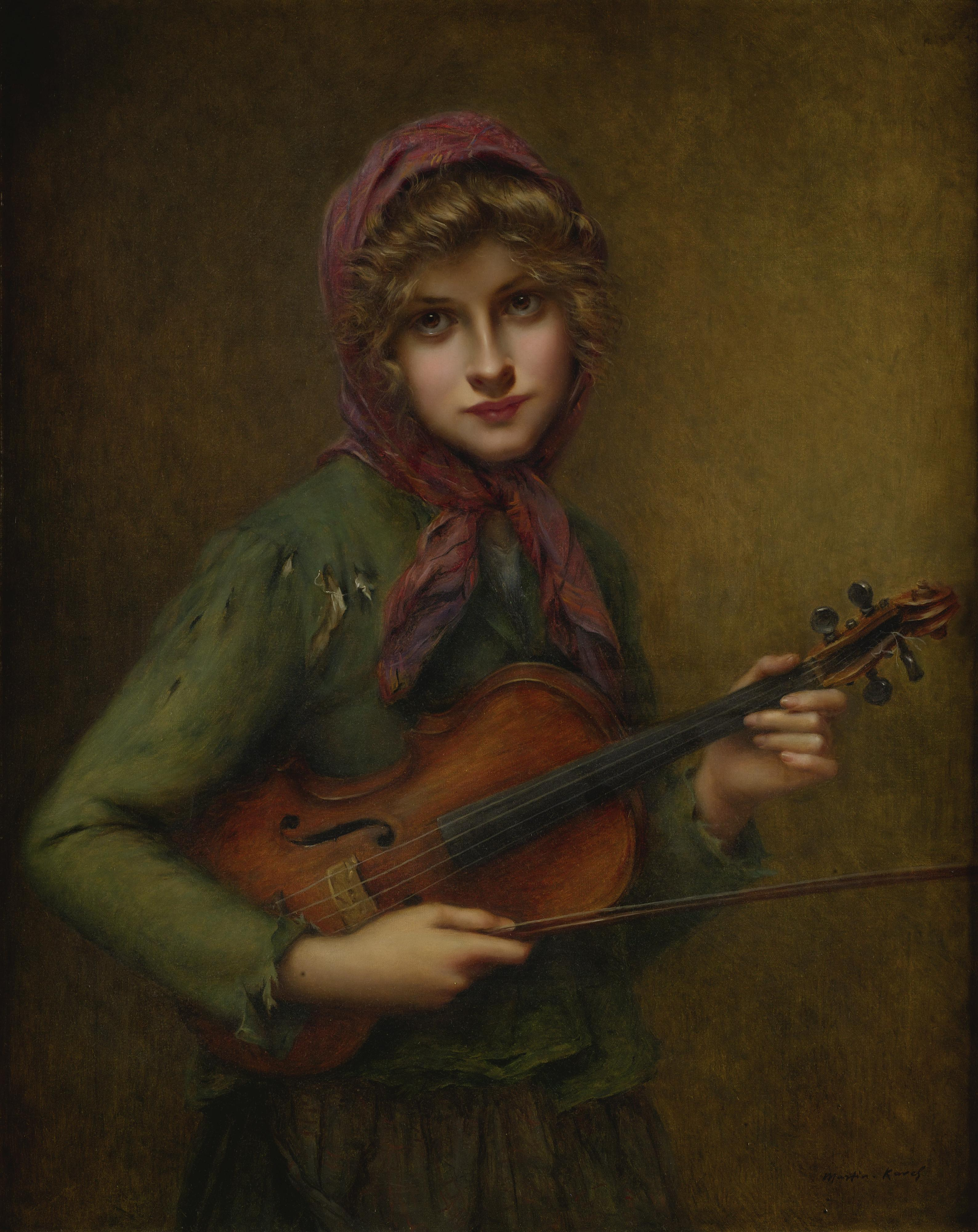
The Young Violinist

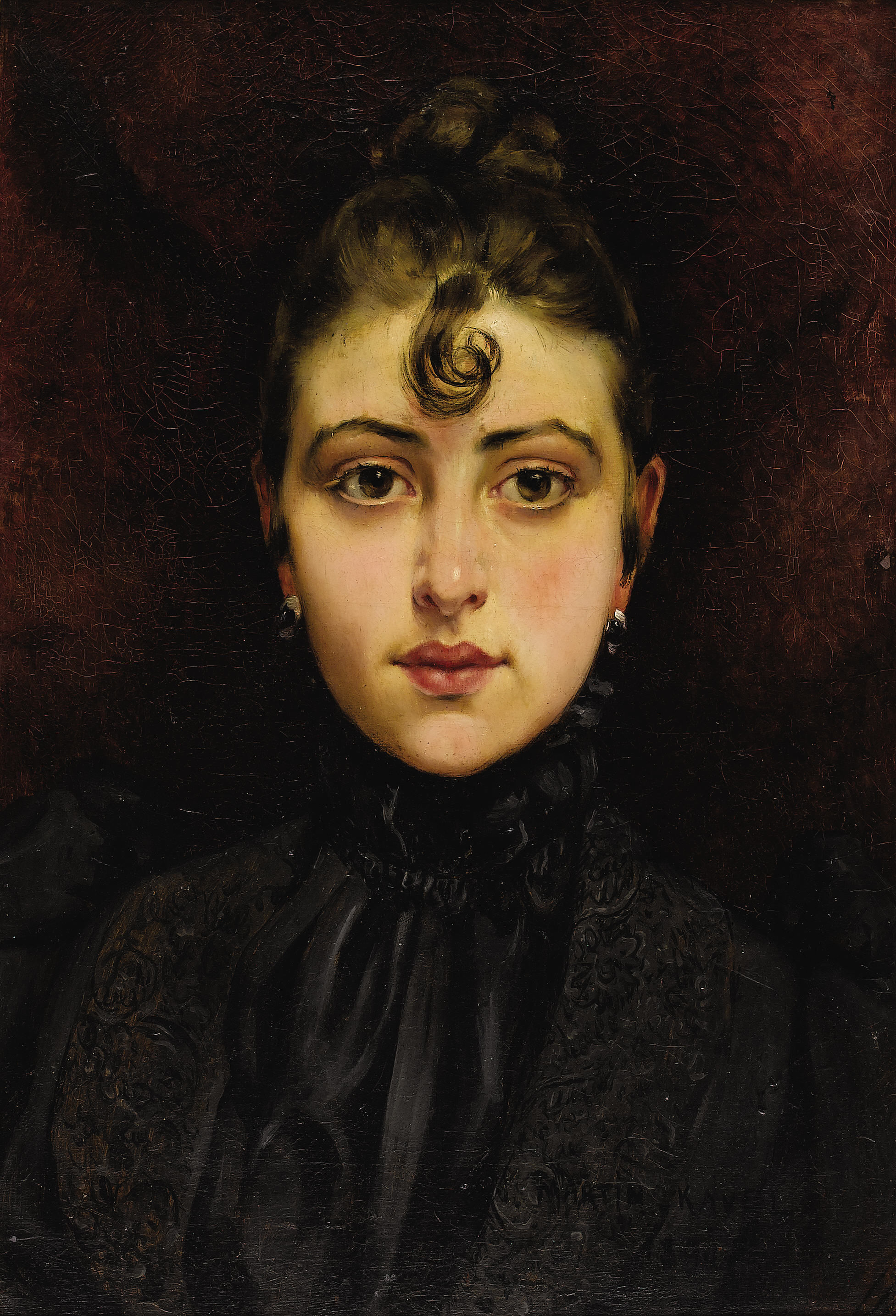
Portrait de jeune femme

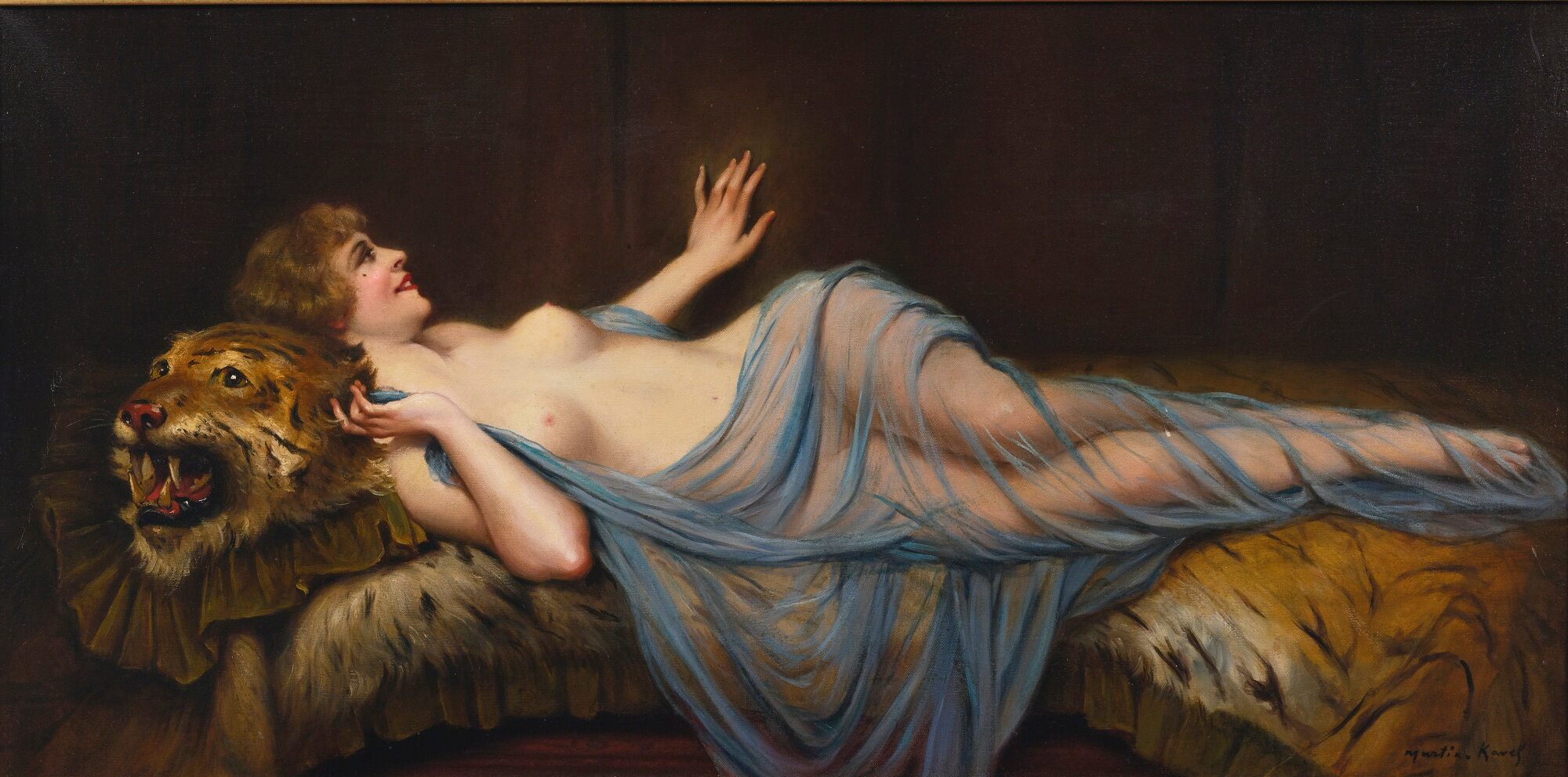
Femme au Tigre
