= 1992 Alexandra state by-election =

- 9 May 1992

Electoral district of Alexandra in the South Australian House of Assembly
	First party	Second party
		IND
Candidate	Dean Brown	Ivar Schmidt
Party	Liberal	Independent
Primary vote	9,662	2,889
Percentage	47.9%	14.3%
Swing	▼11.3	▲14.3
TCP	60.2%	39.8%
TCP swing	▼5.8	▲39.8
MP before election
Ted Chapman
Liberal
Elected MP
Dean Brown
Liberal

A by-election was held for the South Australian House of Assembly seat of Alexandra on 9 May 1992. This was triggered by the resignation of former state Liberal MHA Ted Chapman. The seat had been retained by the Liberals since it was created and first contested at the 1973 state election. The by-election was held on the same day as the Kavel state by-election.

Liberal candidate Dean Brown retained the seat after preferences.

== Results ==
Alexandra state by-election, 9 May 1992
Party	Candidate	Votes	%	±%
Liberal	Dean Brown	9,662	47.9	−11.3
Independent	Ivar Schmidt	2,889	14.3	+14.3
Democrats	Anthony Dickson	2,484	12.3	−2.9
Labor	Johanna van der Velde	2,290	11.3	−13.3
Independent	Peter Charles	1,219	6.0	+6.0
Independent Alliance	Roger Oates	998	4.9	+4.9
Independent Alliance	Reg Macey	644	3.2	+3.2
Total formal votes		20,186	95.5	−2.4
Informal votes		943	4.5	+2.4
Turnout		21,129	88.4	−6.8
Two-candidate-preferred result
Liberal	Dean Brown	12,155	60.2	−5.8
Independent	Ivar Schmidt	8,031	39.8	+39.8
Liberal hold				

== See also ==
- List of South Australian House of Assembly by-elections
