= Dan Cregan =

Former Australian politician

The Honourable Dan Cregan
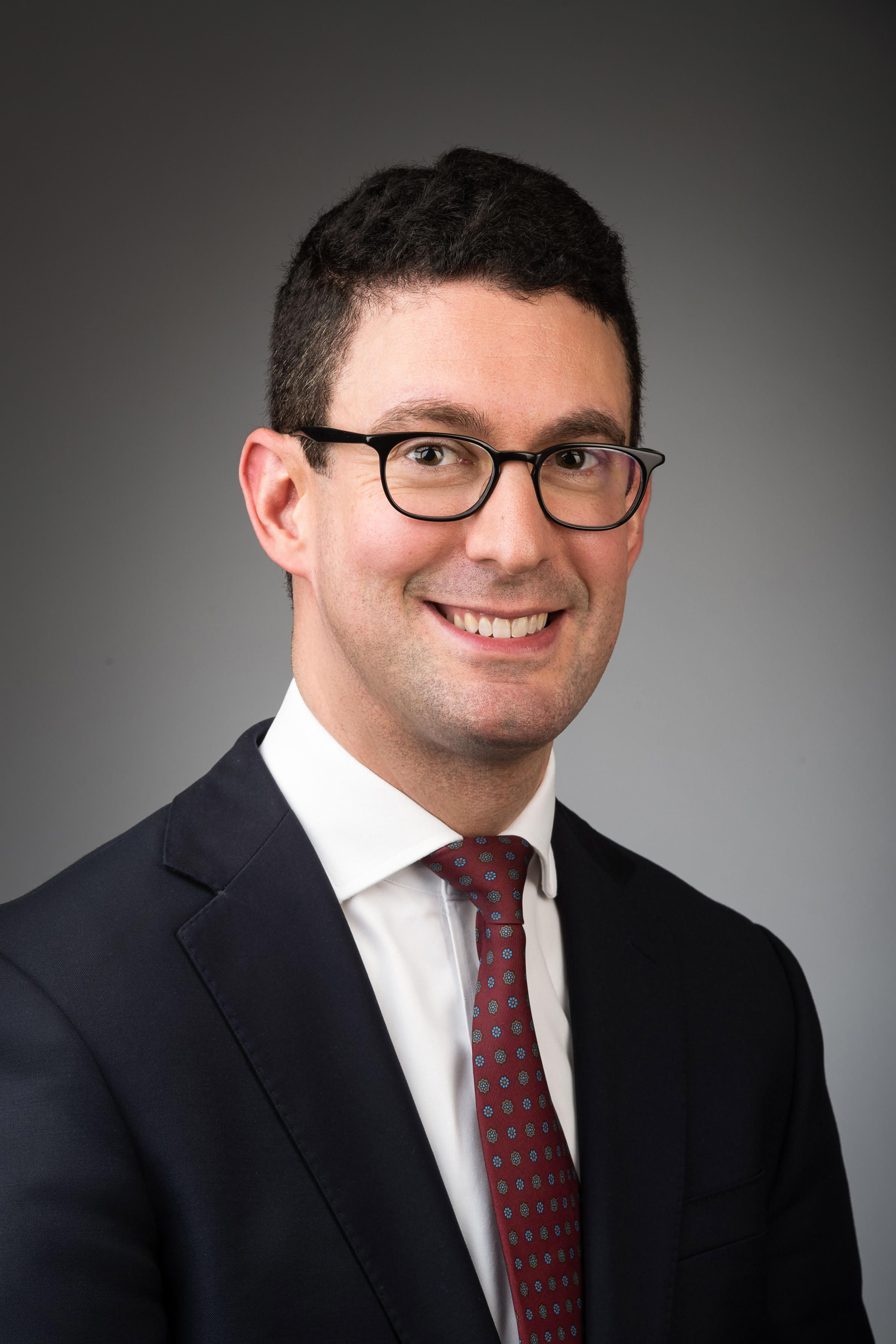
- Cregan in 2021

37th Speaker of the South Australian House of Assembly
- In office 13 October 2021 – 11 April 2024
- Preceded by: Josh Teague
- Succeeded by: Leon Bignell

Special Minister of State
- In office 15 April 2024 – 29 January 2025
- Preceded by: Position established
- Succeeded by: Kyam Maher

Minister for Correctional Services
- In office 15 April 2024 – 29 January 2025
- Preceded by: Joe Szakacs
- Succeeded by: Emily Bourke

Minister for Emergency Services
- In office 15 April 2024 – 29 January 2025
- Preceded by: Joe Szakacs
- Succeeded by: Emily Bourke

Minister for Police
- In office 15 April 2024 – 29 January 2025
- Preceded by: Joe Szakacs
- Succeeded by: Stephen Mullighan

Member of the South Australian House of Assembly for Kavel
- In office 17 March 2018 – 20 March 2026
- Preceded by: Mark Goldsworthy
- Succeeded by: Matt Schultz

Personal details
- Born: Daniel Cregan
- Party: Independent (since 2021)
- Other political affiliations: Liberal (until 2021)
- Education: University of Adelaide; University of Cambridge
- Occupation: Lawyer; Politician

Daniel Cregan is an Australian lawyer, company director and former Independent politician who served as Speaker of the South Australian House of Assembly and as a Cabinet Minister.

== Early life ==
Cregan grew up in South Australia and Western Australia, attending Adelaide University, where he was active in student politics, including as a director of the Adelaide University Union and as president of the Adelaide University Law Students' Society. He also rowed for the Adelaide University Boat Club First VIII.

Cregan received a Cambridge Commonwealth Trust bursary to study law at Peterhouse, Cambridge.

== Career ==
After graduating, Cregan was appointed judge's associate to John Doyle AC KC (Chief Justice of South Australia) and later served as an Australian Youth Ambassador for Development in Jakarta.

While a student Cregan worked as a summer associate at Allens Linklaters, eventually joining the firm as a graduate lawyer and becoming a senior associate in the firm's projects and disputes teams.

Cregan also held a number of board appointments with the Australian Property Institute and as a director of a family company.

== Parliamentary service ==
Following the election of Steven Marshall's government in March 2018, Cregan was made Chair of the South Australian Public Works Committee with oversight of major infrastructure projects.

In October 2021, Cregan announced that he would re-contest his seat as an independent at the forthcoming 2022 South Australian state election saying the State Government had failed to plan for the needs of his rapidly growing regional community.

== Election as Speaker ==
On 12 October 2021, South Australia's Constitution Act was amended to adopt the United Kingdom practice of requiring an independent Speaker. Following passage of the constitutional changes, Cregan was elected Speaker of the South Australian House of Assembly.

After the 2022 South Australian state election, Cregan was nominated by the Government and Opposition to serve as independent Speaker in the 55th Parliament of South Australia.

== Inner Cabinet Minister ==
On 11 April 2024, Cregan resigned his commission as Speaker and was appointed a Cabinet Minister and member of Executive Council after Independent member Geoff Brock stepped down from cabinet due to ill health.

On 28 January 2025, Cregan announced he would not seek re-election in the next election due by 2026. He was succeeded as the member for Kavel by Matt Schultz, whom he had endorsed to run for the seat in 2025.

South Australian House of Assembly
Preceded by Mark Goldsworthy	Member for Kavel; 2018–2026	Succeeded by Matt Schultz
Preceded by Josh Teague	Speaker of the South Australian House of Assembly; 2021–2024	Succeeded by Leon Bignell
