= Mark Goldsworthy =

Australian politician

Member of the South Australian House of Assembly for Kavel
- In office 9 February 2002 – 17 March 2018
- Preceded by: John Olsen
- Succeeded by: Dan Cregan

Personal details
- Born: 24 September 1956 (age 69)
- Party: Liberal Party of Australia (SA)
- Other political affiliations: <! --For additional political affiliations-->
- Domestic partner(s): <! --For those with a domestic partner and not married-->
- Relations: nephew of Grant Chapman
- Parent(s): Roger Goldsworthy and Lynette Goldsworthy (nee Chapman)
- Education: Prince Alfred College, Kent Town, South Australia

Roger Mark Goldsworthy (born 24 September 1956) is an Australian politician who was the member for the electoral district of Kavel from 2002 to 2018, representing the Liberal Party.

Prior to his election into politics, Goldsworthy received an ANZ Banking Group Ltd Diploma in Management as well as Certificates in Accounting and Finance. After his studies, he became an electorate officer and political adviser, as well as being a member of many school committees, and sporting and community groups.

In the 2006 election, Goldsworthy increased his margin to 9.4% after Tom Playford changed from being an independent in 2002 to Family First in 2006.

Goldsworthy is the son of the late Roger Goldsworthy, former Deputy Premier in the 18 September 1979 to 10 November 1982 Liberal government of David Tonkin. Roger was also the first member for Kavel.

Goldsworthy did not re-contest his seat at the 2018 election.

South Australian House of Assembly
| Preceded by John Olsen | Member for Kavel; 2002–2018 | Succeeded by Dan Cregan |
