= Matt Schultz (Australian politician) =

Australian politician

Matt Schultz MP
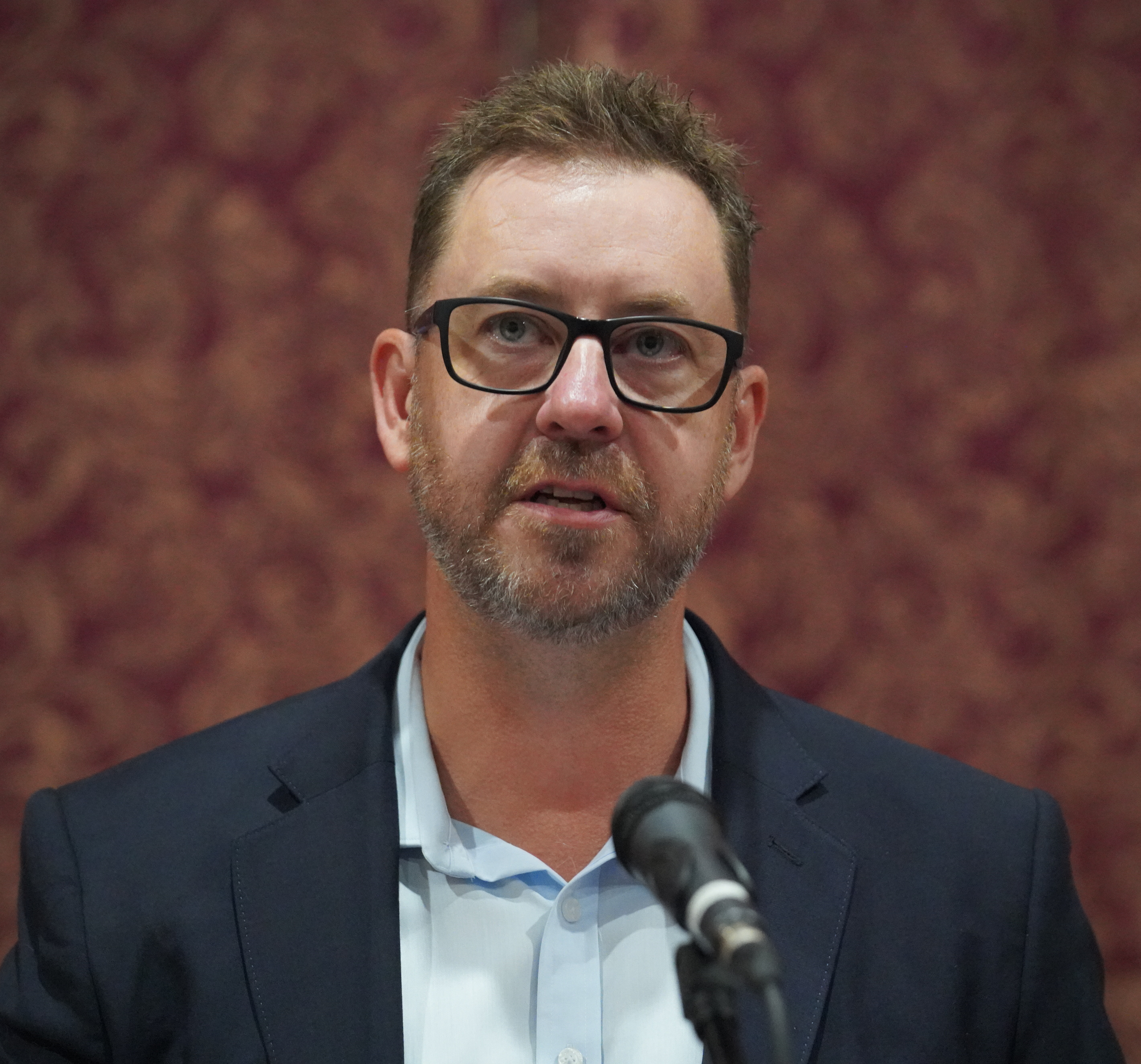
- Schultz in 2026

Member of the South Australian House of Assembly for Kavel
- Incumbent
- Assumed office 21 March 2026
- Preceded by: Dan Cregan

Personal details
- Party: Independent

Matthew John Schultz is an Australian politician, and has represented the district of Kavel in the South Australian House of Assembly since the 2026 state election. Schultz is an independent politician, and has previously served as president of the Mount Barker Football Club and as a senior executive at Flinders University.

== Career ==
Prior to entering politics, Schultz was the president of the Mount Barker Football Club, and a director of international recruitment at Flinders University. In 2025, Schultz was jointly endorsed by incumbent Kavel MP Dan Cregan and federal Mayo MP Rebekha Sharkie to contest Kavel at the 2026 South Australian state election, standing as an independent candidate. Schultz supports the return of passenger rail to Mount Barker. He was successful at the 2026 state election, being elected as MP for Kavel.

South Australian House of Assembly
Preceded by Dan Cregan	Member for Kavel; 2026–present	Incumbent
