= Roger Goldsworthy (politician) =

Australian politician (1929–2025)

The Honourable Roger Goldsworthy AO
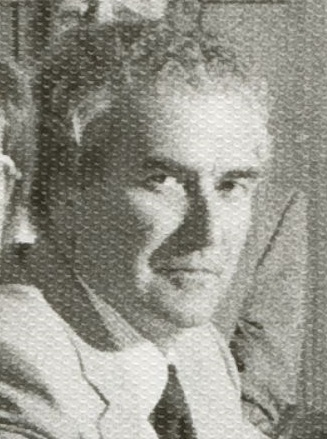

Deputy Premier of South Australia
- In office 18 September 1979 – 10 November 1982
- Premier: David Tonkin
- Preceded by: Hugh Hudson
- Succeeded by: Jack Wright

Deputy Leader of the South Australian Liberal Party
- In office 24 July 1975 – 12 January 1990
- Leader: David Tonkin; John Olsen
- Preceded by: John Coumbe
- Succeeded by: Stephen Baker

Minister of Mines and Energy, Services and Supply
- In office 18 September 1979 – 10 November 1982

Member of the South Australian Parliament for Kavel
- In office 30 May 1970 – 8 Apr 1992
- Preceded by: New District
- Succeeded by: John Olsen

Personal details
- Born: Eric Roger Goldsworthy; 17 July 1929 Lameroo, South Australia, Australia
- Died: 1 July 2025 (aged 95)
- Party: Liberal and Country League; Liberal Party
- Spouse: Lynette nee Chapman
- Relations: brother in law of Grant Chapman
- Children: Mark Goldsworthy
- Parent(s): Ottho Eric Goldsworthy and Lillie May nee Nicholls
- Education: University of Adelaide
- Profession: farmer, secondary teacher, member of parliament

Eric Roger Goldsworthy (17 July 1929 – 1 July 2025) was an Australian politician and 3rd Deputy Premier of South Australia from 1979 to 1982. Goldsworthy represented the House of Assembly seat of Kavel for the Liberal and Country League and Liberal Party from 1970 to 1992.

== Education and early years ==
Goldsworthy had a Bachelor of Science degree from the University of Adelaide (Physics, Chemistry, Maths, Geology) and a Diploma in teaching.

Before entering Parliament Goldsworthy was a farmer and teacher. He was also a member of University of Adelaide Council from 1970 until 1973.

== Political career ==
Goldsworthy became deputy leader of the SA Liberals and hence Deputy Leader of the Opposition, in 1975 when David Tonkin successfully challenged Bruce Eastick's leadership. As such, he became Deputy Premier when the Liberals won the 1979 state election, also serving as Minister of Mines and Energy, Services and Supply. He remained deputy leader when the Liberals went back into opposition in 1982 under John Olsen and held the deputy's post until returning to the backbench in 1989.

Goldsworthy was active in the development and exploitation of mineral resources whilst in parliament as well as in his retirement. Whilst Minister of Mines, he negotiated the establishment of the Olympic Dam mine and the Cooper Basin liquid scheme and put these to Parliament. He was a member of the South Australian government's Resources Industry Development Board (RIDB).

Goldsworthy was an active promoter of the mining industry in SA and a member of the South Australian Chamber of Mines and Energy (SACOME) from its formation. Goldsworthy chaired the Gawler Craton Infrastructure study for the Commonwealth Government.

== Retirement and final years ==
A leading member of the right wing of the South Australia Liberals, Goldsworthy retired from politics in 1992 to allow fellow right-winger and former state party leader Olsen to re-enter parliament and challenge for the leadership. Following his parliamentary career, Goldsworthy continued to support the resources sector in South Australia through his membership of the RIDB.

== Death ==
Goldsworthy died on 1 July 2025, aged 95.

== Honours ==
Goldsworthy was appointed an Officer of the Order of Australia for service to Parliament and the community in 1997.

Political offices
Preceded by Hugh Hudson	Deputy Premier of South Australia; 1979–1982	Succeeded by Jack Wright
South Australian House of Assembly
New division	Member for Kavel; 1970–1992	Succeeded by John Olsen
