= Electoral district of Kavel =

South Australian state electoral district

Kavel South Australia—House of Assembly
- Interactive map of electoral district boundaries
- State: South Australia
- Created: 1970
- MP: Matt Schultz
- Party: Independent
- Namesake: August Kavel
- Electors: 24,139 (2018)
- Area: 326.9 km^{2} (126.2 sq mi)
- Demographic: Rural
- Coordinates: 35°1′10″S 138°58′5″E
Electorates around Kavel:
Bragg	Morialta	Hammond
Waite	Kavel	Hammond
Davenport	Heysen	Heysen

Footnotes
- Electoral District map

Kavel, created in 1969 and coming into effect in 1970, is a single-member electoral district for the South Australian House of Assembly. Located to the east of Adelaide, Kavel is based on the town of Mount Barker and includes much of the eastern portion of the Adelaide Hills.

Kavel incorporates the residential Hills suburbs and the farming areas of Balhannah, Blakiston, Brukunga, Bugle Ranges, Charleston, Dawesley, Forest Range, Hay Valley, Lenswood, Littlehampton, Lobethal, Mount Barker, Mount Barker Junction, Mount Barker Springs, Mount Barker Summit, Nairne, Oakbank, Totness, Wistow and Woodside. Amongst others, previously abolished seats include Gumeracha and Mount Barker.

== History ==
Kavel is named after Lutheran pastor August Kavel who migrated with approximately 250 people to South Australia from Germany in 1838, two years after the colony of South Australia was founded, seeking freedom from religious persecution. They, and later German immigrants and their descendants, have made a significant contribution to South Australia's development and culture.

Kavel has been held by the Liberal Party and its predecessor, the Liberal and Country League, for most of its existence. Like most seats in the Adelaide Hills, it has usually been reasonably safe for that party, and has been held by only four members. The first member, Roger Goldsworthy, served as Deputy Premier of South Australia from 1979 to 1982 under David Tonkin. Goldsworthy retired in 1992 to allow former state Liberal leader John Olsen to transfer from the Australian Senate back to state politics. Olsen went on to become Premier of South Australia after a 1996 party-room coup against Premier Dean Brown.

Olsen was forced to retire from politics after being caught misleading the House, and was succeeded by Mark Goldsworthy, son of Roger. Mark held the seat until handing it to current member Dan Cregan in 2018. Cregan was elected as a Liberal member, but resigned from the party in October 2021 to sit as an independent. At the 2022 election, he was re-elected as an independent in a landslide. Cregan's two-candidate-preferred vote of 75.4 percent was the highest of any candidate, making Kavel the safest seat in the state.

The strong Family First Party vote of 15.7 percent at the 2006 election, the highest in the state, was due in part to their prominent local candidate, church minister Thomas "Tom" Playford V, son of former Premier Sir Thomas Playford, who had represented Gumeracha decades earlier. Tom Playford V had also run as an independent in the 2002 election, achieving a primary vote of 19.4 percent.

== Members for Kavel ==
Member	Party	Term
Roger Goldsworthy	Liberal and Country	1970–1974
Roger Goldsworthy	Liberal	1974–1992
John Olsen	Liberal	1992–2002
Mark Goldsworthy	Liberal	2002–2018
Dan Cregan	Liberal	2018–2021
Dan Cregan	Independent	2021–2026
Matt Schultz	Independent	2026–present

== Election results ==
2026 South Australian state election: Kavel
Party	Candidate	Votes	%	±%
Labor	David Leach	5,901	23.5	+8.9
Independent	Matt Schultz	5,227	20.9	+20.9
Liberal	Bradley Orr	4,990	19.9	−0.2
One Nation	Christiaan Loch	4,890	19.5	+15.8
Greens	Sam Tyler	2,767	11.0	+2.9
Animal Justice	Padma Chaplin	392	1.6	−1.0
Family First	Dayle Baker	351	1.4	+1.4
Real Change	Ashley Moule	256	1.0	+1.0
Independent	Jacob van Raalte	127	0.5	+0.5
Australian Family	Baden Ashman	115	0.5	+0.5
Fair Go	David Stone	48	0.2	+0.2
Total formal votes		25,064	94.8	−2.7
Informal votes		1,384	5.2	+2.7
Turnout		26,448	91.3	+0.0
Two-candidate-preferred result
Independent	Matt Schultz	15,182	60.6	+60.6
Labor	David Leach	9,882	39.4	+39.4
Independent gain from Independent				
