= Playford family =

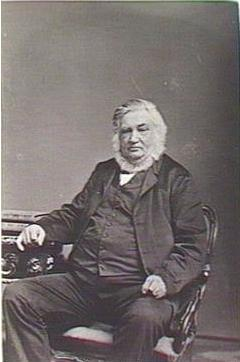
Thomas Playford I

The Playford family has played a significant role in the South Australian and Australian political and social sphere since the early days of European settlement.

- Thomas Playford senior, an ex-soldier who fought at the Battle of Waterloo, a fiery Baptist preacher who arrived in Adelaide c. 1844 and helped found a church called, simply, "The Christian Church".
- Thomas Playford II (Note: Delineating the various Thomas Playfords with a generation number is solely for ease of reference in this and related articles; in Australia there is no tradition of referring to "Thomas Playford II" in speech or in writing.) served as Premier of South Australia from 1887 to 1889 and 1890 to 1892, as well as a Senator in the newly formed Commonwealth of Australia (a name he coined), including a stint as the Federal Minister for Defence.
- Thomas Playford III was a well-known local farmer and Adelaide identity.
- Thomas Playford IV was Premier of South Australia from 1938 to 1965; the longest serving elected national or regional leader in the British Empire/Commonwealth of Nations.
- Thomas Playford V is a Uniting Church (formerly Baptist) minister who ran at the 2002 South Australian state election for the seat of Kavel under the banner of "Independent for Integrity in Parliament", polling 19%. He ran as a Family First candidate for the same seat at the 2006 election, polling 15% of the vote. He later supported SA Best at the 2018 election.

The Playford family heritage can be traced back to 1759, when a baby boy was left at the door of a house in Barnby Dun, Yorkshire, England, with a note to christen the child 'Thomas Playford'. The occupants of the house were given instructions to receive money from a bank account for raising the child. The child grew up to be a farmer, and had a son in 1795 whom he christened 'Thomas Playford'. The tradition of naming the firstborn son in the family in this way has continued since.

The second Playford enlisted in the British Army in 1810, aged 15. Playford's height (6 ft 2 in) enabled him to pass as eighteen. He spent 24 years in the Life Guards, fighting all over Europe in Portugal, Spain and France, including the Battle of Waterloo at the age of 20. He left the Life Guards in 1834, received a land grant in Canada for his service, and journeyed there with his wife and family. His wife and a child died in the country, so he and his remaining kin returned to England. He worked as a historian for the Life Guards until 1844 when he migrated to the then-province of South Australia. Playford became a pastor there, built a property at Mitcham, and preached regularly for his own 'Christian Church', which was essentially Baptist in character.

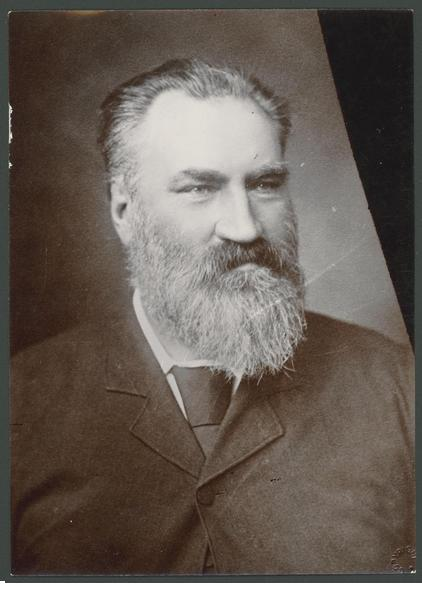
Thomas Playford II, premier and senator

The third Playford, Thomas Playford II, was born at Bethnal Green, London, in 1837. He was raised on the Mitcham property in South Australia and subsequently became a farmer like his predecessors, buying property at Norton Summit and growing vegetables, plums and apples. He was elected to the local East Torrens Council in 1863 at the age of 27; and then to the State Parliament in 1868, representing the constituency of Onkaparinga. He lost his seat in 1871 and regained it in 1875 only to lose it again until he was re-elected in 1887, upon which he became Premier of South Australia. He subsequently lost the premiership in 1889, regained it in 1890, and then spent a great deal of his term absent in India. After losing an election, he relocated to London to represent South Australia as Agent General to the United Kingdom. While in England, Playford was thrice offered a knighthood, but declined it each time.

He returned to South Australia to assist Charles Kingston in his government, but ultimately crossed the floor to bring down Kingston over his plans to lessen the power of the Legislative Council. With the advent of Australian Federation, Playford became a Senator for South Australia. He was leader of the Senate and the 7th Minister for Defence. After one term as a Senator, Playford was defeated. He ran again in 1910, was unsuccessful, and retired to Kent Town, where he died in 1915, aged 78.

The fourth Playford, father of Sir Thomas, was born in 1861. He became a farmer at the Norton Summit property. He was, like his forebears, a regular churchgoer, and only once was involved in politics with a short stint on the East Torrens District Council. In comparison, his wife Elizabeth was the local correspondent of The Advertiser, treasurer and chief member of the local Baptist Church, and a teacher. Four children were born to the couple; three daughters and one son, Thomas Playford IV. Thomas Playford IV was an Australian politician from the state of South Australia. He served as Premier of South Australia and leader of the Liberal and Country League (LCL) from 5 November 1938 to 10 March 1965. Though controversial, it was the longest term of any elected government leader in Australian history. His tenure as premier was marked by a period of population and economic growth unmatched by any other Australian state. He was known for his parochial style in pushing South Australia's interests, and was known for his ability to secure a disproportionate share of federal funding for the state as well as his shameless haranguing of federal leaders. His string of election wins was supported by a system of malapportionment later dubbed erroneously, the "Playmander".

== See also ==
- Political families of Australia
