= List of road routes in South Australia =

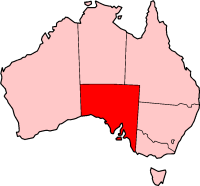
South Australia

Road routes in South Australia assist drivers navigating roads in urban, rural, and scenic areas of the state. Today, all numbered routes in the state are allocated a letter (M, A or B) in addition to a one, two or three digit number, denoting different levels of significance. The route system includes officially designated highways, urban freeways and arterial roads, and other important cross-state roads that have not been declared highways.

== History ==
Route numbers have been allocated to South Australia's roads since 1955, with the introduction of National Routes across all states and territories in Australia, symbolised by a white shield with black writing; National Route 1 ('Highway 1') was one of the best-known numbered national routes, due to its fame for circumnavigating the continent.

In 1974, the National Highway network was defined, which allowed some existing National Routes to be upgraded to National Highways. These were marked with the same shield design as the National Routes, except for their gold-on-green colouring and the word NATIONAL added across the top. Unlike many other states, South Australia never adopted State Routes, although it allowed two Victorian rural State Routes to cross the border and terminate in locations within 20 km of it when they were rolled out there in 1985.

In 1998, the state replaced its system of National Routes and National Highways with an alphanumeric route numbering system. Many existing numbered routes were allocated a letter (M, A or B) in addition to its number, with 'M' routes denoting freeways, 'A' routes denoting routes of state significance, and 'B' routes denoting routes of local significance. Instead of shields, route numbers are displayed as yellow text on green rectangular backgrounds, and has now become the sole route numbering system in the state. The changeover to alphanumeric routes was carried out from 1998 either by removing old "shield" coverplates installed on newer signs, or installing new alphanumeric coverplates on old shielded signs, adopting the same design as Victoria (which adopted its alphanumeric system a year previous). Trailblazers were introduced with alphanumeric routes in Adelaide's metropolitan area and the tourist areas of Victor Harbor and the Barossa Valley in 1998, with allocations extended to cover country areas in 1999. Former National Highways still retained their shield design (including NATIONAL markings) after conversion, but were modified in 2017 to remove them, bringing their design in line with the rest of the state.

== Alphanumeric Routes ==
All alphanumeric routes listed here are derived from the Government of South Australia's Location SA service.

=== M routes ===
Roads allocated an M route are usually at least dual-carriageway motorways or expressways, with at least two lanes in each direction. These roads keep traffic moving and are likely to have no traffic lights and higher speed limits.

Route	Component roads	From	Via	To	Length	Notes
M1	South Eastern Freeway	Glen Osmond	Stirling; Mount Barker; Callington	Murray Bridge	69 km (43 mi)	Part of Highway 1: – western end re-aligned through Eagle on the Hill from Mount Barker Road to current alignment when freeway extension through the Heysen Tunnels opened in 2000 – continues north west as along Glen Osmond Road beyond Adelaide – continues east as along Princes Highway to Tailem Bend – allocated in 1998, progressively being replaced by from 2017
M2	Northern Expressway	Gawler	Angle Vale; Waterloo Corner; Wingfield	Hindmarsh	51 km (32 mi)	Allocated in 2016 (replacing)
M2	Northern Connector	Gawler	Angle Vale; Waterloo Corner; Wingfield	Hindmarsh	51 km (32 mi)	Allocated upon opening in 2020
M2	North–South Motorway	Gawler	Angle Vale; Waterloo Corner; Wingfield	Hindmarsh	51 km (32 mi)	– allocated through Wingfield (replacing) when South Road Superway opened in 2014, progressively being replaced by from 2017 – extended south to Hindmarsh (replacing) when Torrens to Torrens section opened in 2018 – to be extended further south eventually to Southern Expressway as further stages of the North–South Motorway are completed – continues south as along South Road to Southern Expressway at St Marys
M2	Southern Expressway	St Marys	Darlington; Reynella	Noarlunga Downs	21 km (13 mi)	– southern end extended from Reynella to Noarlunga Downs when second stage opened in 2001 – northern end extended from Darlington to St Marys when Darlington bypass opened in 2020 – to be extended further north eventually to North–South Motorway as further stages are completed – continues north as along South Road to North–South Motorway at Hindmarsh
National Highway M20	Northern Expressway	Virginia	Munno Para West; Angle Vale	Gawler	22 km (14 mi)	Allocated upon opening in 2010, replaced by when Northern Connector commenced construction in 2016
Decommissioned or unsigned route

=== A routes ===
Roads allocated an A route are main or arterial routes providing a high standard of driving conditions both across single- or dual-carriageway roads, linking to and from M roads and provide access to major towns and places of interest across metro and regional SA.

Route	Component roads	From	Via	To	Length	Notes
A1	Eyre Highway; Augusta Highway; Port Wakefield Highway; Port Wakefield Road; Main North Road	SA/WA border	Ceduna; Kyancutta; Kimba; Port Augusta; Snowtown; Port Wakefield; Gepps Cross	Medindie	1,248 km (775 mi)	Part of Highway 1: – continues west as along Eyre Highway into WA eventually to Norseman – discontinuous across the Adelaide city centre, partially – allocated in 1998, progressively being replaced by from 2017
A1	Fullarton Road; Glen Osmond Road	Eastwood	Frewville	Glen Osmond	3.3 km (2 mi)	– discontinuous across the Adelaide city centre, partially – eastern end along Mount Barker Road terminating in Crafers truncated to current alignment when South Eastern Freeway extension through the Heysen Tunnels opened in 2000 – continues east as along South Eastern Freeway to Murray Bridge – allocated in 1998, progressively being replaced by from 2017
A1	Princes Highway	Murray Bridge	Swanport Bridge	Tailem Bend	22 km (14 mi)	– continues west as along South Eastern Freeway to Glen Osmond – continues south as along Princes Highway to Mount Gambier – allocated in 1998, progressively being replaced by from 2017
A1	Princes Highway	Mount Gambier		SA/Vic border	18 km (11 mi)	– continues west as along Princes Highway to Tailem Bend – continues east as along Princes Highway into Victoria eventually to Geelong
A2	South Road	Hindmarsh	Mile End; Edwardstown	St Marys	11 km (7 mi)	– allocated from Regency Park to Darlington (replacing) when South Road Superway opened in 2014 – northern end truncated to Hindmarsh (replaced by) when Torrens to Torrens section of North–South Motorway opened in 2018 – southern end truncated to St Marys (replaced by) when Darlington bypass of Southern Expressway opened in 2020 – continues north as along North–South Motorway to Gawler – continues south as along Southern Expressway to Noarlunga Downs
A3	Cross Road	Plympton	Unley Park	Glen Osmond	9.5 km (6 mi)	
A5	Anzac Highway	Keswick	Plympton	Glenelg	13.8 km (9 mi)	Northern end truncated from Adelaide to Keswick when City Ring Route re-aligned in 2017
A6	Sir Donald Bradman Drive; Burbridge Road	Mile End	Brooklyn Park	West Beach	6.9 km (4 mi)	Eastern end truncated from Adelaide to Mile End when City Ring Route re-aligned in 2017
A7	Port Road; Commercial Road	Hindmarsh	West Croydon; Woodville South; Cheltenham	Port Adelaide	9.9 km (6 mi)	
A8	Dukes Highway	Tailem Bend	Coonalpyn; Tintinara; Keith; Bordertown	SA/Vic border	192 km (119 mi)	– continues east as along Western Highway into Victoria eventually to Buangor – concurrency with along Dukes Highway from Lowan Vale to Bordertown – allocated in 1998, progressively being replaced by from 2017
A9	Port River Expressway; Salisbury Highway; John Rice Avenue	Port Adelaide	Mawson Lakes; Salisbury	Elizabeth Vale	20.9 km (13 mi)	Eastern end extended along Salisbury Highway and John Rice Avenue from Dry Creek to Elizabeth Vale (replacing /) when South Road Superway opened in 2014
A10	Northcote Terrace; North East Road	Gilberton	Greenacres; Modbury	Houghton	19.3 km (12 mi)	Continues east as along North East Road to Nurioopta
A11	North Terrace; Payneham Road; Lower North East Road; Hancock Road; Yatala Vale Road; The Grove Way	Kent Town	Marden; Campbelltown; Hope Valley; Tea Tree Gully; Golden Grove	Salisbury Heights	25.1 km (16 mi)	Northern end re-aligned from Lower North East Road terminating in Houghton (replaced by) to current alignment in 2021
A13	Main South Road; Victor Harbor Road	Darlington	Old Reynella; Old Noarlunga; Willunga	Victor Harbor	67.6 km (42 mi)	– allocation along South Road, Salisbury Highway and John Rice Avenue terminating in Elizabeth Vale truncated to current alignment (replaced by / and) when South Road Superway opened in 2014 – concurrency with along Victor Harbor Road through Willunga Hill – allocated along South Road through Wingfield in 1998, replaced by in 2014, progressively being replaced by from 2017
A14	East Avenue; Holbrooks Road; Marion Road	Beverley	Brooklyn Park; Plympton	Darlington	15.3 km (10 mi)	
A15	Tapleys Hill Road; Brighton Road; Ocean Boulevard; Lonsdale Road; Dyson Road; Murray Road; Gawler Street	Alberton	Seaton; Glenelg; Brighton; Hallett Cove; Seaford; Port Noarlunga	Maslin Beach	45.3 km (28 mi)	
A15	Gray Street; Saltfleet Street; Commercial Road; Maslin Beach Road	Alberton	Seaton; Glenelg; Brighton; Hallett Cove; Seaford; Port Noarlunga	Maslin Beach	45.3 km (28 mi)	Southern end extended from Hallett Cove to Maslin Beach in 2021
A16	Oliver Rogers Road; Victoria Road; Nelson Street; Semaphore Road; Causeway Road; Bower Road	Outer Harbor	Port Adelaide; Mansfield Park; Gepps Cross; Hope Valley	Houghton	37.5 km (23 mi)	
A16	Grand Junction Road	Outer Harbor	Port Adelaide; Mansfield Park; Gepps Cross; Hope Valley	Houghton	37.5 km (23 mi)	Allocated (from Regency Park to Northfield) in 1998, progressively being replaced by from 2017
A16	Lower North East Road	Outer Harbor	Port Adelaide; Mansfield Park; Gepps Cross; Hope Valley	Houghton	37.5 km (23 mi)	Eastern end extended along Lower North East Road from Hope Valley to Houghton (replacing) in 2021
A17	Hampstead Road; Taunton Road; Ascot Avenue; Lower Portrush Road; Portrush Road	Northfield	Payneham	Glen Osmond	13.7 km (9 mi)	Allocated in 1998, progressively being replaced by from 2017
A18	Bolivar Road; Kings Road; McIntyre Road	Paralowie	Parafield	Modbury	12.5 km (8 mi)	
A20	Main North Road; Gawler Bypass; Sturt Highway	Gepps Cross	Elizabeth; Gawler; Nurioopta; Waikerie; Barmera; Renmark	SA/Vic border	267 km (166 mi)	– continues east as along Sturt Highway into Victoria through Mildura, and into New South Wales eventually to Tarcutta – allocated in 1998, progressively being replaced by from 2017 – western end along Main North Road terminating at Gepps Cross truncated to Gawler (replaced by) when Northern Expressway opened in 2010, reverted to in 2017
A21	Port Road; Park Terrace; Fitzroy Terrace; Robe Terrace; Park Road (s/bound); Mann Road (n/bound); Hackney Road; Dequetteville Terrace; Fullarton Road; Greenhill Road; Goodwood Road; West Terrace	Adelaide	North Adelaide	Adelaide	15.6 km (10 mi)	Former City Ring Route, replaced by in 2017, listed clockwise from the western corner of Adelaide city centre
A22	Cavan Road; Churchill Road; Torrens Road	Gepps Cross	Kilburn	Ovingham	7.7 km (5 mi)	
A32	Barrier Highway	Giles Corner	Saddleworth; Burra; Ucolta	SA/NSW border	377 km (234 mi)	– continues east as along Barrier Highway into New South Wales to Nyngan – concurrency with along Barrier Highway through Burra
A32	Horrocks Highway	Giles Corner	Tarlee	Gawler Belt	40 km (25 mi)	Later replaced by along Horrocks Highway, truncated to Giles Corner
A52	Main North Road	Gepps Cross	Elizabeth; Salisbury	Gawler	32 km (20 mi)	Allocated when Northern Expressway opened (replacing) in 2010, reverted to in 2017
A66	Riddoch Highway	Keith	Padthaway; Naracoorte; Coonawarra; Penola; Nangwarry; Tarpeena	Mount Gambier	210 km (130 mi)	Continues south as along Riddoch Highway to Port MacDonnell
A87	Stuart Highway	SA/NT border	Marla; Coober Pedy; Pimba	Port Augusta West	928 km (577 mi)	– continues north as along Stuart Highway into NT eventually to Daly Waters – allocated in 1998, progressively being replaced by from 2017
Decommissioned or unsigned route

=== B routes ===
Roads allocated a B route are secondary or local arterial roads, These roads link to and from A and M roads and provide access to places of interest across metro and regional SA.

Route	Component roads	From	Via	To	Length	Notes
B1	Princes Highway	Tailem Bend	Meningie; Kingston SE; Millicent	Mount Gambier	350 km (217 mi)	Part of Highway 1: – continues north as along Princes Highway to Murray Bridge – continues east as along Princes Highway into Victoria eventually to Geelong
B10	North East Road; Torrens Valley Road; Eden Valley Road; Angaston Road	Houghton	Birdwood; Mount Pleasant; Angaston	Nurioopta	73 km (45 mi)	– continues west as along North East Road to Adelaide – concurrencies with: along North East Road through Chain of Ponds; along Torrens Valley Road through Birdwood; along Torrens Valley Road through Mount Pleasant
B12	Mallee Highway	Tailem Bend	Lameroo; Pinnaroo	SA/Vic border	145 km (90 mi)	– continues east as along Mallee Highway into Victoria eventually to Piangil – concurrency with along Mallee Highway through Pinnaroo
B19	Main North Road; Barossa Valley Way	Gawler	Lyndoch	Nuriootpa	39 km (24 mi)	
B23	Main South Road	Old Noarlunga	Aldinga; Yankalilla; Delamere	Cape Jervis	75 km (47 mi)	Route continues west over Backstairs Passage to Hog Bay Road on Kangaroo Island
B23	Hog Bay Road; Playford Highway	Penneshaw	Pelican Lagoon	Kingscote	60 km (37 mi)	Route continues east over Backstairs Passage to Main South Road on the South Australian mainland
B26	Greenhill Road	Glenside	Uraidla	Balhannah	24 km (15 mi)	Allocated in 2019
B27	Old Norton Summit Road; Lobethal Road; Mount Torrens Road	Kent Town	Norton Summit; Basket Range; Lobethal	Mount Torrens	37 km (23 mi)	Allocated in 2019
B28	Fullarton Road; Old Belair Road; Upper Sturt Road; Waverley Ridge Road; Mount Lofty Summit Road	Fullarton	Belair; Crafers	Summertown	25 km (16 mi)	Allocated in 2019
B29	Unley Road; Belair Road; Main Road; Clarendon Road	Unley	Mitcham; Blackwood	Clarendon	27 km (17 mi)	Allocated in 2020
B31	Gorge Road; Tippet Road; North East Road; South Para Road; Lyndoch Valley Road	Campbelltown	Chain of Ponds; Williamstown	Lyndoch	49 km (30 mi)	Concurrency with along North East Road through Chain of Ponds
B33	Mount Barker Road; Strathalbyn Road	Stirling	Aldgate; Echunga	Strathalbyn	37 km (23 mi)	
B34	Warren Road; Torrens Valley Road; Onkaparinga Valley Road; Mount Barker Road; Echunga Road; Battunga Road; Brookman Road; Victor Harbor Road; Pages Flat Road	Williamstown	Birdwood; Willunga; Balhannah; Echunga	Myponga	109 km (68 mi)	Concurrencies with: along Victor Harbor Road through Willunga Hill; along Torrens Valley Road through Birdwood
B35	Cricks Mill Road; Tungkillo Road; Randell Road; Reedy Creek Road; Mannum Road; Swanport Road	Mount Crawford	Mount Pleasant; Palmer	Murray Bridge	63 km (39 mi)	Concurrency with along Torrens Valley Road through Mount Pleasant
B36	Randell Road; Mannum Road	Palmer	Mannum	Murray Bridge North	38 km (24 mi)	
B37	Wellington Road; Long Valley Road; Alexandrina Road; Port Elliot Road; Hindmarsh Road; Waitpinga Road; Range Road	Mount Barker	Strathalbyn; Goolwa; Port Elliot; Victor Harbor	Delamere	126 km (78 mi)	Concurrency with along Hindmarsh Road through Victor Harbor
B45	Langhorne Creek Road; Ferry Road	Strathalbyn	Langhorne Creek	Wellington East	49 km (30 mi)	
B55	Old Princes Highway; Karoonda Highway; Bookpurnong Road	Murray Bridge	Karoonda; Loxton	Berri	202 km (126 mi)	
B56	Horrocks Pass Road; Willowie Road; RM Williams Way; Petersburg Road	Winninowie	Wilmington; Orroroo	Peterborough	108 km (67 mi)	Concurrencies with: along RM Williams Way from Orroroo to Black Rock; along Horrocks Highway through Wilmington
B57	Browns Well Highway; Mallee Highway; Ngarkat Highway; Dukes Highway; Naracoorte Road	Loxton	Paruna; Pinnaroo; Ngarkat; Bordertown	Cadgee	292 km (181 mi)	Concurrencies with: along Dukes Highway from Lowan Vale to Bordertown; along Mallee Highway through Pinnaroo
B64	Goyder Highway	Crystal Brook	Spalding; Burra; Morgan	Monash	266 km (165 mi)	Concurrencies with: along Barrier Highway through Burra; along RM Williams Way through Spalding; along Horrocks Highway through Gulnare
B66	Riddoch Highway	Mount Gambier	Mount Schank Allendale East	Port MacDonnell	28 km (17 mi)	Continues north as along Riddoch Highway to Mount Gambier
B77	Mallala Road; Old Port Wakefield Road; Gawler Road; Two Wells Road; Ryde Street; Overway Bridge Road; Fifteenth Street; Twelfth Street	Two Wells	Gawler River	Gawler	23.5 km (15 mi)	Allocated in 2021
B78	Wilkins Highway	Jamestown		Hallett	38 km (24 mi)	
B79	Wilkins Highway; RM Williams Way; Beniah Road; Petersburg Road	Warnertown	Gladstone; Jamestown; Peterborough	Ucolta	104 km (65 mi)	Concurrency with along RM Williams Way from Mannanarie to Jamestown
B80	RM Williams Way	Hawker	Carrieton; Orroroo; Jamestown; Spalding	Barinia	220 km (137 mi)	Concurrencies with: along RM Williams Way from Orroroo to Black Rock; along Goyder Highway through Spalding; along RM Williams Way from Mannanarie to Jamestown
B81	Thiele Highway	Gawler Belt	Kapunda; Eudunda	Morgan	115 km (71 mi)	
B82	Main North Road; Horrocks Highway	Quorn	Wilmington; Melrose; Gladstone; Clare; Giles Corner; Tarlee	Gawler Belt	282 km (175 mi)	– Concurrencies with: along Wilmington–Ucolta Road through Wilmington; along Goyder Highway through Gulnare – Later extended from Giles Corner to Gawler Belt, swapping allocation with
B83	The Outback Highway; Flinders Ranges Way	Marree; Oodnadatta Track; Birdsville Track	Farina; Lyndhurst; Leigh Creek; Parachilna; Hawker; Quorn	Stirling North	292 km (181 mi)	Much of this route still is signed; shields still visible at Flinders Ranges Way and West Terrace intersection in Quorn
B84	Port Wakefield–Balaklava Road; Saddleworth Road; Marrabel Road; Curio Road	Port Wakefield	Balaklava; Auburn; Saddleworth; Marrabel	Eudunda	100 km (62 mi)	
B85	Copper Coast Highway	Port Wakefield	Paskeville; Kadina	Wallaroo	58 km (36 mi)	
B86	Yorke Highway	Port Arthur	Ardrossan; Minlaton; Marion Bay	Stenhouse Bay	181 km (112 mi)	
B88	St Vincent Highway	Pine Point	Port Vincent; Stansbury; Edithburgh; Yorketown	Warooka	101 km (63 mi)	
B89	Spencer Highway	Port Pirie	Port Broughton; Wallaroo; Maitland	Minlaton	199 km (124 mi)	
B90	Tod Highway	Kyancutta	Lock; Cummins	Uley	176 km (109 mi)	
B91	Birdseye Highway	Elliston	Lock; Cleve	Cowell	198 km (123 mi)	
B97	Pimba Road; Olympic Dam Highway	Pimba	Woomera; Roxby Downs	Olympic Dam	89 km (55 mi)	
B100	Flinders Highway; Lincoln Highway	Ceduna	Streaky Bay; Elliston; Port Lincoln; Tumby Bay; Cowell; Whyalla	Lincoln Gap	715 km (444 mi)	
B101	Southern Ports Highway	Kingston SE	Robe; Beachport	Millicent	119 km (74 mi)	
B160	Glenelg Highway	Glenburnie		SA/Vic border	15.3 km (10 mi)	Continues east as along Glenelg Highway into Victoria eventually to Ballarat (a Victorian B route "extended" into SA)
B201	Old Sturt Highway; Berri–Renmark Road	Barmera	Berri	Monash	16.8 km (10 mi)	Former Sturt Highway alignment

=== C routes ===
Roads allocated a C route are major collector roads, linking local roads and streets to the arterial road network for inter-state travel.

While officially gazetted C routes exist in South Australia, these are currently based on past and existing Victorian C routes terminating in South Australian locations just inside the SA/Vic state border, and do not exist anywhere else in the state.

Route	Component roads	From	Via	To	Length	Notes
C192	Glenelg River Road	Mount Gambier	Wye	SA/Vic border	30 km (19 mi)	Continues east as along Glenelg River Road into Victoria to Portland
C198	Casterton Road	Penola		SA/Vic border	17.4 km (11 mi)	Continues east as along Casterton–Penola Road into Victoria to Casterton
C212	Edenhope Road	Wrattonbully		SA/Vic border	13.3 km (8 mi)	Continues east as along Edenhope–Penola Road into Victoria to Edenhope
C240	Wimmera Highway	Naracoorte		SA/Vicborder	23 km (14 mi)	Continues east as along Wimmera Highway into Victoria to Marong

=== R routes ===
Roads allocated a R route are for ring roads, provide a path around a city, rather than travelling through it.

South Australia is currently the only state in the country to use R routes. To date, there is only one R route: around Adelaide, the state's capital city.

Route	Component roads	From	Via	To	Length	Notes
R1 City Ring Route	Port Road; Park Terrace; Fitzroy Terrace; Robe Terrace; Park Road (s/bound); Mann Road (n/bound); Hackney Road; Dequetteville Terrace; Fullarton Road; Greenhill Road; Richmond Road; South Road; James Congdon Drive	Adelaide	North Adelaide	Adelaide	16.9 km (11 mi)	Replaced in 2017 on a slightly different alignment to the southwest, listed clockwise from the western corner of Adelaide city centre

== Former Routes ==
=== National Routes ===
National Routes were the first type of route numbering to be attempted in Australia on a large scale, signed with a white shield and black writing (similar in shape to the shield that appears on the Australian coat of arms), with South Australia receiving routes in 1955. They highlighted the interstate links connecting major population, industrial and principal regions of New South Wales to the rest of the Australia, in a way that was readily identifiable to interstate travellers. The system was prepared by the Conference of State Road Authorities, held between 1953 and 1954: once each state road authority agreed to the scheme, it was rolled out federally.

Selected routes were later upgraded into National Highways when the National Roads Act was passed in 1974.

South Australia's National Routes were eventually replaced with the alphanumeric system, introduced across the state between 1998 and 1999: each route was converted to an alphanumeric route number, rendering the black-and-white shield redundant. Most National Routes in rural South Australia kept their number during the conversion; two exceptions were National Route 47 (which became B83), and National Route 83 (which became B80, B82 and B83).

Route	Component roads	From	Via	To	Length	Notes
National Route 1	Eyre Highway; Princes Highway (I); Port Wakefield Road; Main North Road; Fullarton Road; Glen Osmond Road; Mount Barker Road; South Eastern Freeway; Princes Highway (II)	SA/WA border	Ceduna; Kimba; Port Augusta; Port Wakefield; Adelaide; Murray Bridge; Tailem Bend; Meningie; Kingston SE; Mount Gambier	SA/Vic border	1,716 km (1,066 mi)	– progressively reallocated along South Eastern Freeway sections as they opened – replaced by from SA/WA border to Tailem Bend in 1974
National Route 1	Princes Highway (II)	SA/WA border	Ceduna; Kimba; Port Augusta; Port Wakefield; Adelaide; Murray Bridge; Tailem Bend; Meningie; Kingston SE; Mount Gambier	SA/Vic border	1,716 km (1,066 mi)	Replaced by: from Mount Gambier to SA/Vic border; from Tailem Bend to Mount Gambier in 1998
Alternate National Route 1	Flinders Highway; Lincoln Highway	Ceduna	Streaky Bay; Elliston; Port Lincoln; Tumby Bay; Cowell; Whyalla	Lincoln Gap	715 km (444 mi)	Allocated after road sealing and upgrades of Flinders Highway completed in 1978, replaced by in 1999
Alternate National Route 1	Southern Ports Highway	Kingston SE	Robe; Beachport	Millicent	119 km (74 mi)	– former Princes Highway alignment (bypassed in 1933) – allocated in 1978, replaced by in 1999
Alternate National Route 1	Adelaide Road; Old Princes Highway	White Hill	Murray Bridge	Long Flat	13.2 km (8 mi)	Allocated when Swanport Bridge over the Murray River opened in 1979, replaced by from White Hill to Murray Bridge East in 1998
National Route 8	Dukes Highway	Tailem Bend	Coonalpyn; Tintinara; Keith; Bordertown	SA/Vic border	192 km (119 mi)	Replaced by in 1974
National Route 12	Mallee Highway	Tailem Bend	Lameroo; Pinnaroo	SA/Vic border	145 km (90 mi)	Replaced by in 1998
National Route 20	Main North Road; Gawler Bypass; Sturt Highway	Gepps Cross	Elizabeth; Gawler; Nurioopta; Waikerie; Barmera; Renmark	SA/Vic border	267 km (166 mi)	Replaced by in 1992
Alternative National Route 20	Old Sturt Highway	Barmera	Berri	Monash	16.8 km (10 mi)	Former Sturt Highway alignment, replaced by in 1999
National Route 32	Main North Road; Barrier Highway	Gawler	Giles Corner; Saddleworth; Burra; Ucolta	SA/NSW border	417 km (259 mi)	Replaced by in 1998
National Route 47	Flinders Ranges Way	Hawker	Quorn	Stirling North	98 km (61 mi)	Replaced by in 1998
National Route 56	Wilmington–Ucolta Road	Winninowie	Orroroo; Peterborough	Ucolta	123 km (76 mi)	Replaced by in 1998
National Route 64	Goyder Highway	Crystal Brook	Spalding; Burra; Morgan	Monash	266 km (165 mi)	Replaced by in 1998
National Route 83	The Outback Highway	Lyndhurst	Leigh Creek; Hawker; Clare	Giles Corner	292 km (181 mi)	Replaced by in 1998
National Route 83	RM Williams Way	Lyndhurst	Leigh Creek; Hawker; Clare	Giles Corner	292 km (181 mi)	Replaced by in 1998
National Route 83	Main North Road	Lyndhurst	Leigh Creek; Hawker; Clare	Giles Corner	292 km (181 mi)	Replaced by in 1998
National Route 87	Stuart Highway	SA/NT border	Marla; Coober Pedy; Pimba	Port Augusta West	928 km (577 mi)	Replaced by in 1974
Decommissioned or unsigned allocation

=== National Highways ===
With the passing of the National Roads Act in 1974, selected National Routes were further upgraded to the status of a National Highway: interstate roads linking Australia's capital cities and major regional centres that received federal funding, and were of higher importance than other National Routes. These new routes were symbolised by green shields with gold writing, and the word "National" along the top of the shield. Most of South Australia's National Highways were declared in 1974 and their shields converted in the following years, with National Highway 20 later declared in 1992.

Like National Routes, South Australia's National Highways were also replaced with the alphanumeric system, introduced across the state in 1998: each route was converted to an alphanumeric route number, all keeping their number during the conversion, but also initially keeping the National green-and-gold shield design; this was eventually eliminated in 2017.

Route	Component roads	From	Via	To	Length	Notes
National Highway 1	Eyre Highway; Princes Highway (I); Port Wakefield Road; Main North Road; Fullarton Road; Glen Osmond Road; Mount Barker Road	SA/WA border	Ceduna; Kimba; Port Augusta; Port Wakefield; Adelaide; Murray Bridge	Tailem Bend	1,716 km (1,066 mi)	– replaced by in 1998, being progressively replaced by from 2017 – Princes Highway (I) renamed Augusta Highway in 2011
National Highway 1	South Eastern Freeway	SA/WA border	Ceduna; Kimba; Port Augusta; Port Wakefield; Adelaide; Murray Bridge	Tailem Bend	1,716 km (1,066 mi)	– progressively reallocated along South Eastern Freeway sections as they opened eventually to Murray Bridge in 1979 – replaced by in 1998, being progressively replaced by from 2017
National Highway 1	Princes Highway (II)	SA/WA border	Ceduna; Kimba; Port Augusta; Port Wakefield; Adelaide; Murray Bridge	Tailem Bend	1,716 km (1,066 mi)	Replaced by in 1998, being progressively replaced by from 2017
National Highway 8	Dukes Highway	Tailem Bend	Coonalpyn; Tintinara; Keith; Bordertown	SA/Vic border	192 km (119 mi)	– western end re-aligned from Tailem Bend to Coomandook through Cooke Plains in 1980 – re-aligned through Bordertown when Bordertown bypass opened in 1987 – replaced by in 1998, being progressively replaced by from 2017
National Highway 20	Main North Road; Gawler Bypass; Sturt Highway	Gepps Cross	Elizabeth; Gawler; Nurioopta; Waikerie; Barmera; Renmark	SA/Vic border	267 km (166 mi)	Replaced by in 1998, being progressively replaced by from 2017
National Highway 87	Stuart Highway	SA/NT border	Marla; Coober Pedy; Pimba	Port Augusta West	928 km (577 mi)	Replaced by in 1998, being progressively replaced by from 2017
Decommissioned or unsigned allocation

=== State Routes (from Victoria) ===
South Australia never adopted State Routes, but allowed two Victorian rural State Routes to cross the border and terminate in South Australian locations within 20 km of it when they were rolled out there in 1985; these were replaced by their Victorian equivalent alphanumeric allocations in 1998.

Route	Component roads	From	Via	To	Length	Notes
State Route 112	Glenelg Highway	Glenburnie		SA/Vic border	15.3 km (10 mi)	Continued east as along Glenelg Highway into Victoria eventually to Ballarat; replaced by in 1998
State Route 130	Wimmera Highway	Naracoorte		SA/Vic border	23 km (14 mi)	– Continued east as along Wimmera Highway into Victoria eventually to St Arnaud; replaced by in 1998 – shield still visible at the intersection of Wimmera Highway and Hynam Caves Road in Hynam, 10km east of Naracoorte
Decommissioned or unsigned route

== See also ==
- List of road routes in the Australian Capital Territory
- List of road routes in New South Wales
- List of road routes in the Northern Territory
- List of road routes in Queensland
- List of road routes in Tasmania
- List of road routes in Victoria
- List of road routes in Western Australia
- List of highways in South Australia
