= List of highways in Australia =

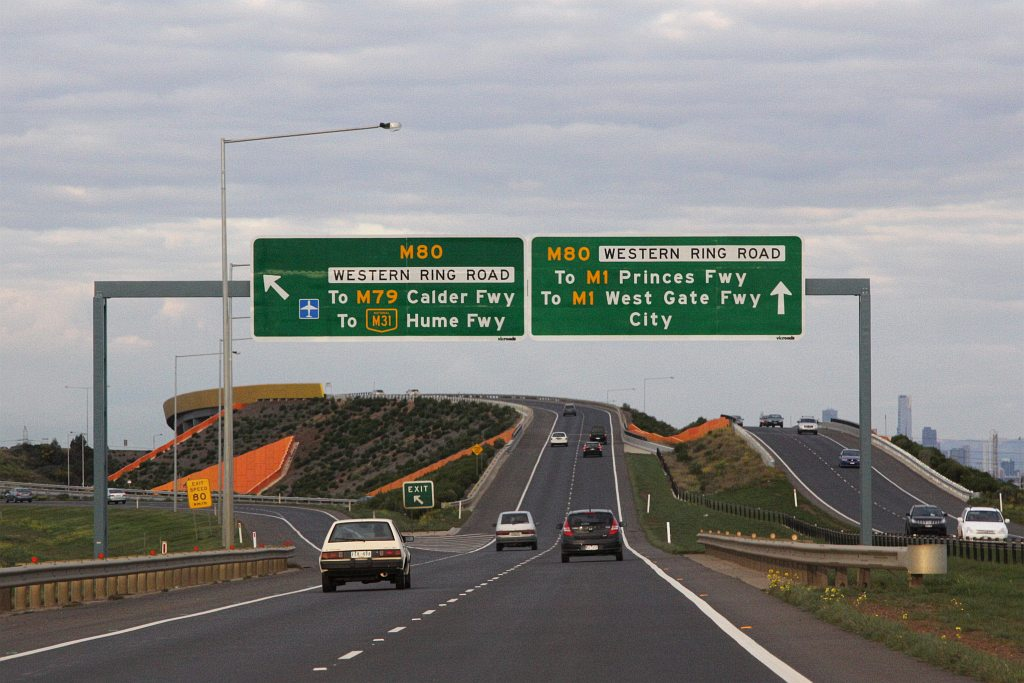
Deer Park Bypass on the Western Freeway, a section of the Western Highway in Victoria

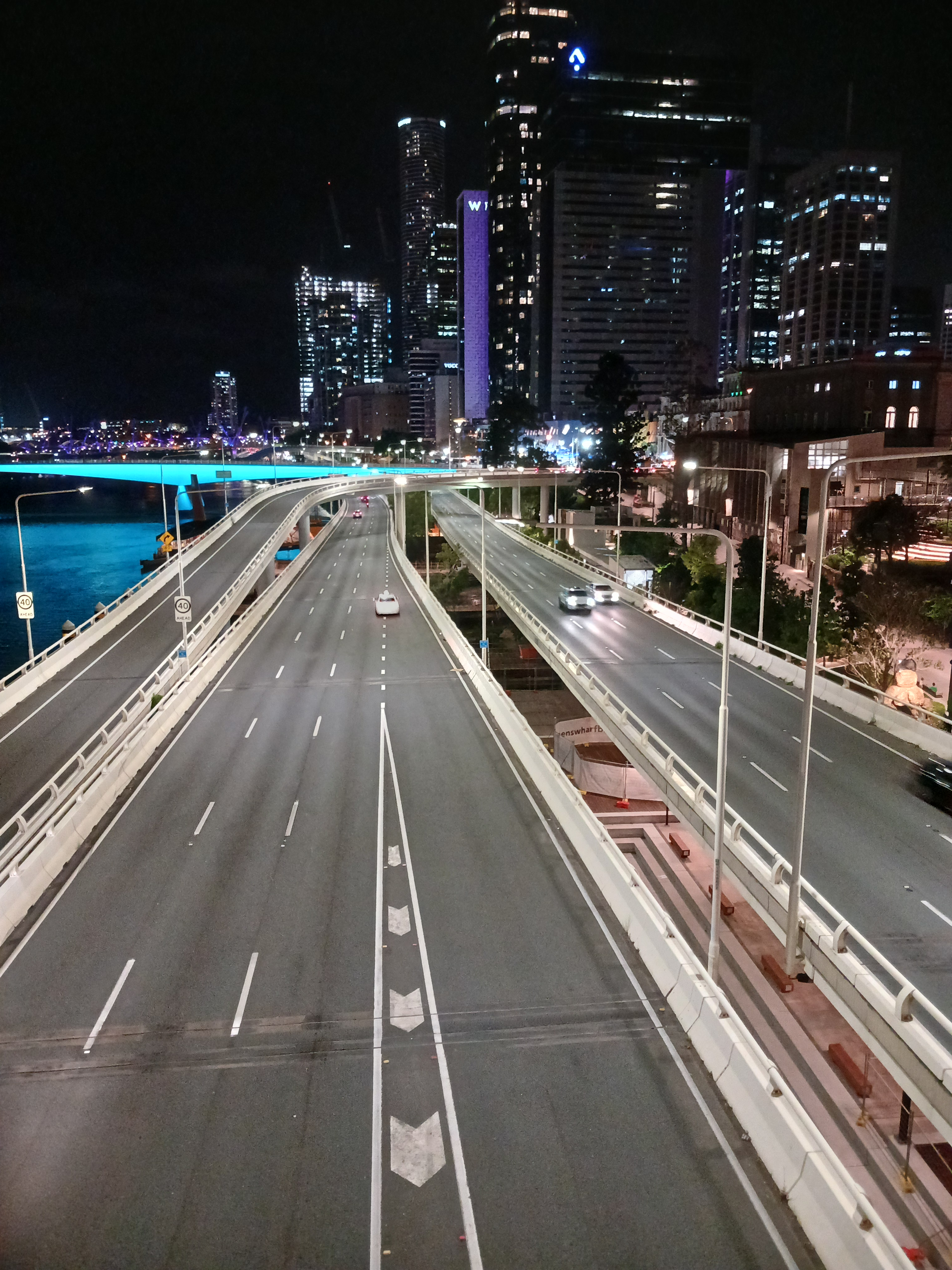
The Brisbane-Brunswick Heads Pacific Motorway passing through Brisbane CBD, Queensland

Roads with highway names in Australia are roads that are usually, but not necessarily, classified as a highway (Note: Or a similar level in states and territories using a hierarchy without the highway classification – see Highways in Australia § Classification) by a state or territory road authority. There are also many roads classified as a highway, but without a highway name. For example, the Great Southern Highway is classified as a main road, not as a highway, or Hereward Highway in the Sydney suburb of Blacktown which is a two lane suburban street with the name Highway, while the King Georges Road is classified as a highway, but does not have the word "Highway" in its name. There are a number of freeways in Australia, or freeway-standard roads, which may or may not be classified as highways, and may or may not be named as highways.

This list contains all roads that satisfy one of the following criteria:

- Are named as a highway, motorway or freeway
- Are classified as a highway, but without a highway, motorway or freeway name

== A ==
Road	Route number(s)	State/Territory
Airport Link (tunnel)	State Route M7	Queensland
Albany Highway	State Route 30	Western Australia
Anne Beadell Highway		South Australia
Anne Beadell Highway		Western Australia
Anzac Highway	State Route A5	South Australia
Arnhem Highway	State Route 36	Northern Territory
Arthur Highway	State Route A9	Tasmania
Augusta Highway	National Highway A1	South Australia

== B ==
Road	Route number(s)	State/Territory
Balonne Highway	State Route 49	Queensland
Barkly Highway	State Route A2 National Route 83	Queensland
Barkly Highway	(future)	Northern Territory
Barrier Highway	State Route A32	South Australia
Barrier Highway	State Route A32	New South Wales
Barton Highway	State Route A25	New South Wales
Barwon Highway	State Route 85	Queensland
Bass Highway	National Highway 1 State Route A2	Tasmania
Bass Highway	State Route M420 State Route B460	Victoria
Batman Highway	State Route B73	Tasmania
Bellarine Highway	State Route B110	Victoria
Birdseye Highway	State Route B91	South Australia
Borung Highway	State Route C234	Victoria
Bradfield Highway (bridge)	State Route 15	Queensland
Brand Highway	National Highway 1	Western Australia
Brisbane Valley Highway	State Route A17	Queensland
Brockman Highway	State Route 10	Western Australia
Brooker Highway	National Highway 1	Tasmania
Brookton Highway	State Route 40	Western Australia
Browns Well Highway	State Route B57	South Australia
Bruce Highway	State Route M1 State Route A1	Queensland
Bruxner Highway	State Route B60	New South Wales
Buchanan Highway	National Route 80 State Route C80	Northern Territory
Buntine Highway	National Route 96 State Route B96	Northern Territory
Bunya Highway	State Route 49	Queensland
Burketown Normanton Road	National Route 1	Queensland
Burnett Highway	State Route A3	Queensland
Burwood Highway	State Route 26 State Route C412	Victoria
Bussell Highway	State Route 10	Western Australia

== C ==
Road	Route number(s)	State/Territory
Cahill Expressway	State Route M1	New South Wales
Calder Highway	State Route M79 State Route A79	Victoria
Cann Valley Highway	State Route B23	Victoria
Canning Highway	State Route 6	Western Australia
Capricorn Highway	State Route A4	Queensland
Captain Cook Highway	State Route 44 National Highway 1	Queensland
Carnarvon Highway	State Route A7 State Route A55 National Route 46	Queensland
Carnarvon Highway		New South Wales
Carpentaria Highway	National Route 1 State Route B1	Northern Territory
Castlereagh Highway	State Route A55	Queensland
Castlereagh Highway	State Route B55	New South Wales
Centenary Motorway / Highway	State Route M5 State Route A5	Queensland
Central Coast Highway	State Route A49	New South Wales
Channel Highway	State Route B68	Tasmania
City West Link	State Route A4	New South Wales
Clem Jones Tunnel	State Route M7	Queensland
Cobb Highway	State Route B75	New South Wales
Connie Sue Highway		Western Australia
Coolgardie–Esperance Highway	National Route 1 National Highway 94	Western Australia
Copper Coast Highway	State Route B85	South Australia
Cumberland Highway	State Route A28	New South Wales
Cunningham Highway	National Highway A15 National Highway 15 State Route 42 State Route M15	Queensland

== D ==
Road	Route number(s)	State/Territory
D'Aguilar Highway	State Route 96 State Route A17 State Route 85	Queensland
Dawson Highway	State Route 60 State Route A7	Queensland
Domain Highway	State Route B36	Tasmania
Donohue Highway		Queensland
Doomadgee Road	National Route 1	Queensland
Dukes Highway	National Highway A8	South Australia

== E ==
Road	Route number(s)	State/Territory
East Derwent Highway	State Route B32	Tasmania
East Freeway	State Route M5	New South Wales
East Tamar Highway	State Route A8	Tasmania
Eastern Distributor	State Route M1	New South Wales
Alexandra Parade	State Route 83	Victoria
Esk Highway	State Route A4	Tasmania
Eyre Highway	National Highway A1	South Australia
Eyre Highway	National Highway 1	Western Australia

== F ==
Road	Route number(s)	State/Territory
Federal Highway	State Route M23 State Route A23	New South Wales
Flinders Highway	State Route A6	Queensland
Flinders Highway	State Route B100	South Australia

== G ==
Road	Route number(s)	State/Territory
Gary Highway		Western Australia
Gateway Motorway	State Route M1 State Route M2	Queensland
General Holmes Drive	State Route M1 State Route A1	New South Wales
Gillies Highway	State Route 52	Queensland
Glenelg Highway	State Route B160	Victoria
Gold Coast Highway	State Route 2	New South Wales
Gold Coast Highway	State Route 2	Queensland
Golden Highway	State Route B84	New South Wales
Gore Highway	State Route A39 State Route 85	Queensland
Gore Hill Freeway	State Route M1	New South Wales
Goulburn Valley Highway	State Route M39 State Route A39 State Route B340	Victoria
Goyder Highway	State Route B64	South Australia
Great Eastern Highway	National Highway 94 National Route ALT94 National Route 1 State Route 51	Western Australia
Great Northern Highway	National Highway 1 National Highway 95 National Route 1	Western Australia
Great Southern Highway	State Route 120	Western Australia
Great Western Highway	State Route A32 State Route A44	New South Wales
Gregory Highway	State Route A7 State Route 63	Queensland
Gulf Developmental Road	National Route 1	Queensland
Gunbarrel Highway		Northern Territory
Gunbarrel Highway		Western Australia
Gwydir Highway	State Route B76	New South Wales
Gympie Arterial Road	State Route M3	Queensland

== H ==
Road	Route number(s)	State/Territory
Hamilton Highway	State Route B140	Victoria
Henty Highway	State Route A200 State Route B200	Victoria
Hills Motorway	State Route M2	New South Wales
Hopkins Highway	State Route B120	Victoria
Horrocks Highway	State Route A32 State Route B82	South Australia
Houghton Highway (bridge)	State Route 26	Queensland
Hume Motorway / Highway	State Route M31 State Route A22 State Route A28	New South Wales
Hume Freeway	State Route M31	Victoria
Hunter Expressway	State Route M15	New South Wales
Huon Highway	State Route A6	Tasmania
Hyland Highway	State Route C482	Victoria

== I ==
Road	Route number(s)	State/Territory
Illawarra Highway	State Route A48	New South Wales
Inner City Bypass, Brisbane	State Route M3	Queensland
Ipswich Motorway	State Route M2 State Route M7	Queensland
Isis Highway	State Route 3 State Route 52	Queensland

== K ==
Road	Route number(s)	State/Territory
Kakadu Highway	State Route 21	Northern Territory
Kamilaroi Highway	State Route B76	New South Wales
Karoonda Highway	State Route B55	South Australia
Kennedy Highway	National Route 1 State Route 62	Queensland
Kiewa Valley Highway	State Route C531	Victoria
Kings Highway	State Route B52	New South Wales

== L ==
Road	Route number(s)	State/Territory
Lake Leake Highway	State Route B34	Tasmania
Lake Highway	State Route A5	Tasmania
Landsborough Highway	State Route A2	Queensland
Lane Cove Tunnel	State Route M2	New South Wales
Lasseter Highway	State Route 4	Northern Territory
Leach Highway	State Route 7	Western Australia
Legacy Way (tunnel)		Queensland
Leichhardt Highway	State Route A5 State Route 85	Queensland
Lincoln Highway	State Route B100	South Australia
Loddon Valley Highway	State Route B260	Victoria
Logan Motorway	State Route M2 State Route M6	Queensland
Lyell Highway	State Route A10	Tasmania

== M ==
Road	Route number(s)	State/Territory
Mallee Highway		South Australia
Mallee Highway		Victoria
Marlborough Highway		Tasmania
Maroondah Highway		Victoria
McIvor Highway		Victoria
Meander Valley Highway		Tasmania
Melba Highway		Victoria
Melton Highway		Victoria
Midland Highway		Victoria
Midland Highway		Tasmania
Mid-Western Highway		New South Wales
Mitchell Highway		Queensland
Mitchell Highway		New South Wales
Monaro Highway		New South Wales
Monaro Highway		Victoria
Moonie Highway		Queensland
Moorooduc Highway		Victoria
Mount Lindesay Highway		Queensland
Mountain Highway		Victoria
Muir Highway		Western Australia
Mulligan Highway		Queensland
Murchison Highway		Tasmania
Murray Valley Highway	No shield	New South Wales
Murray Valley Highway		Victoria

== N ==
Road	Route number(s)	State/Territory
Nardoo Burketown Road		Queensland
Nepean Highway		Victoria
Newcastle Link Road		New South Wales
New England Highway		New South Wales
New England Highway		Queensland
Newell Highway		New South Wales
Newell Highway		Queensland
Ngarkat Highway		South Australia
North West Coastal Highway		Western Australia
Northern Highway		Victoria

== O ==
Road	Route number(s)	State/Territory
Old Hume Highway		New South Wales
Old Hume Highway		Victoria
Olympic Highway		New South Wales
Omeo Highway		Victoria
Outback Highway		Northern Territory
Outback Highway		Queensland
Outback Highway		Western Australia
Ovens Highway		Victoria
Oxley Highway		New South Wales

== P ==
Road	Route number(s)	State/Territory
Pacific Highway		New South Wales
Pacific Motorway (Sydney to Newcastle)		New South Wales
Pacific Motorway (Brisbane to Brunswick Heads)		New South Wales
Pacific Motorway (Brisbane to Brunswick Heads)		Queensland
Palmerston Highway		Queensland
Peak Downs Highway		Queensland
Philip Highway		South Australia
Playford Highway		South Australia
Plenty Highway		Northern Territory
Port of Brisbane Motorway		Queensland
Princes Motorway / Highway		New South Wales
Princes Motorway / Highway		South Australia
Princes Motorway / Highway		Victoria
Pyrenees Highway		Victoria

== R ==
Road	Route number(s)	State/Territory
Reid Highway		Western Australia
Riddoch Highway		South Australia
Ridgley Highway		Tasmania
Riverina Highway		New South Wales
Riverside Expressway		Queensland
Roe Highway		Western Australia
Roper Highway		Northern Territory

== S ==
Road	Route number(s)	State/Territory
Salisbury Highway		South Australia
Savannah Way		Northern Territory
Savannah Way		Queensland
Savannah Way		Western Australia
Sandover Highway		Northern Territory
Scenic Highway		Queensland
Silver City Highway		New South Wales
Smith Street Motorway		Queensland
Snowy Mountains Highway		New South Wales
South Arm Highway		Tasmania
South Coast Highway		Western Australia
South Gippsland Highway		Victoria
South West Motorway		New South Wales
South Western Highway		Western Australia
Southern Outlet		Tasmania
Southern Ports Highway		South Australia
Spencer Highway		South Australia
St Vincent Highway		South Australia
Stott Highway		South Australia
Strzelecki Highway		Victoria
Stuart Highway		Northern Territory
Stuart Highway		South Australia
Sturt Highway		New South Wales
Sturt Highway		Victoria
Sturt Highway		South Australia
Sunraysia Highway		Victoria
Sunshine Motorway		Queensland
Surf Coast Highway		Victoria
Sydney Harbour Tunnel		New South Wales

== T ==
Road	Route number(s)	State/Territory
Tablelands Highway		Northern Territory
Tasman Highway		Tasmania
Thiele Highway		South Australia
Tod Highway		South Australia
Tonkin Highway		Western Australia

== V ==
Road	Route number(s)	State/Territory
Vasse Highway		Western Australia
Victoria Highway	(future)	Northern Territory
Victoria Highway		Western Australia

== W ==
Road	Route number(s)	State/Territory
Warburton Highway		Victoria
Warrego Highway		Queensland
Warrigal Highway		Victoria
Warringah Freeway		New South Wales
West Tamar Highway		Tasmania
Western Distributor		New South Wales
Western Freeway		Queensland
Western Highway		Victoria
Western Motorway		New South Wales
Western Port Highway		Victoria
Westlink		New South Wales
Wilkins Highway		South Australia
Wide Bay Highway		Queensland
Wills Developmental Road		Queensland
Wimmera Highway		Victoria
Wollogorang Road		Northern Territory
Worlds End Highway		South Australia

== Y ==
Road	Route number(s)	State/Territory
Yorke Highway		South Australia

== Z ==
Road	Route number(s)	State/Territory
Zeehan Highway		Tasmania

== See also ==
=== State and territory listings ===
- List of highways in New South Wales
- List of highways in Victoria
- List of highways in Queensland
- List of highways in South Australia
- List of highways in Western Australia
- List of highways in Tasmania
- List of highways in the Northern Territory

=== Other articles about transport in Australia ===
- Highways in Australia
- Transport in Australia
- Road transport in Australia
- List of freeways in Australia
- List of Australian airports
- List of Australian ports
