= Wilmington–Ucolta Road =

Road in South Australia

Wilmington–Ucolta Road Willowie Road, Petersburg Road South Australia
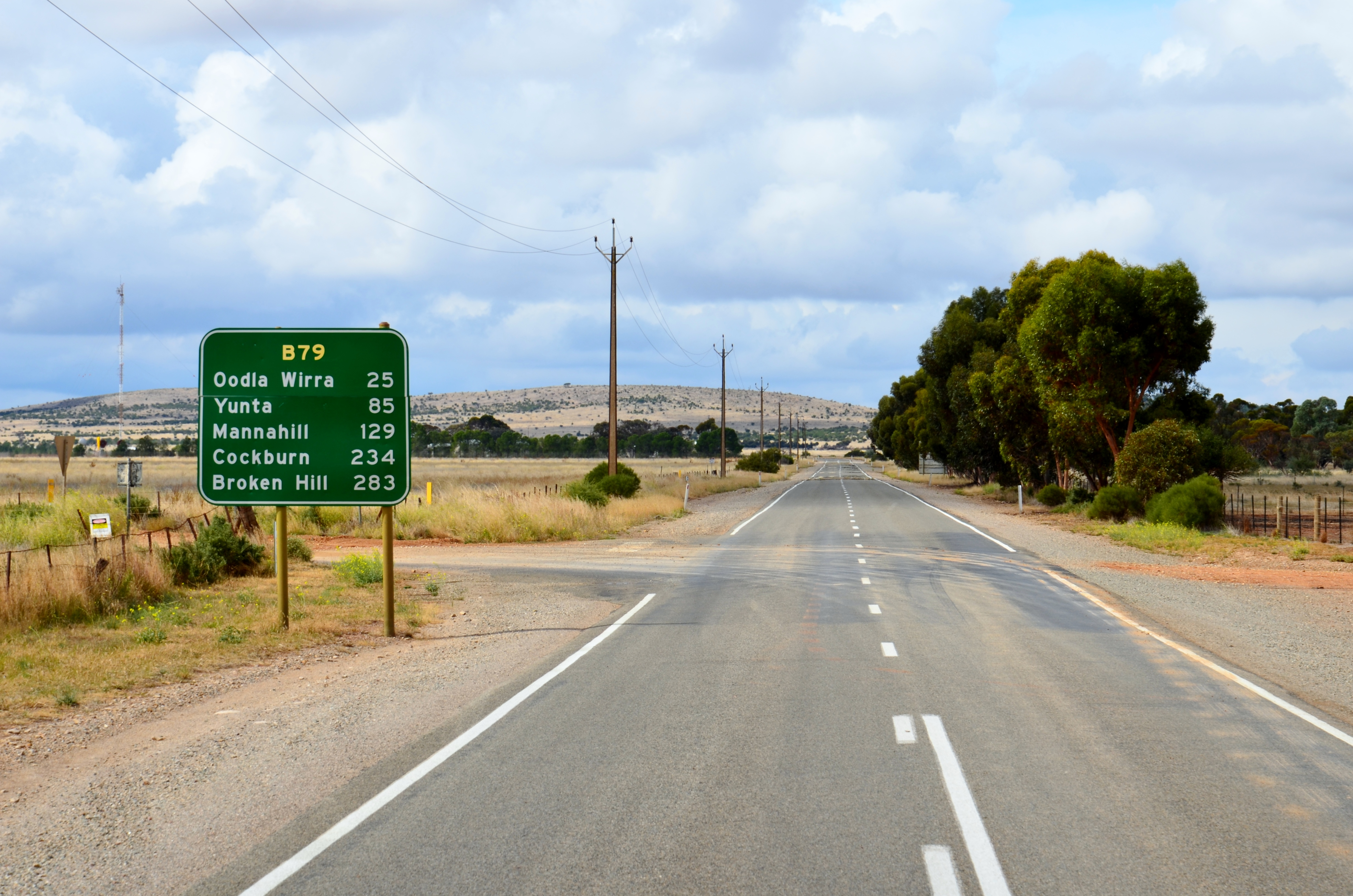
- Heading east out of Peterborough
- Coordinates: 32.666041°S 138.111388°E (West end); 32.957477°S 138.980041°E (East end)

General information
- Type: Road
- Length: 99.7 km (62 mi)
- Route number(s): B56 (1998–present) (Wilmington–Peterborough); B79 (1998–present) (Peterborough–Ucolta); Concurrencies: RM Williams Way (Orroroo–Black Rock)
- Former route number: National Route 56 (1955–1998)

Major junctions
- West end: Main North Road; Wilmington, South Australia
- RM Williams Way; Beniah Road
- East end: Barrier Highway; Ucolta, South Australia

Location(s)
- Region: Yorke and Mid North
- Major suburbs: Willowie, Orroroo, Peterborough

Wilmington–Ucolta Road is a 100 kilometre major road connecting Port Augusta to Peterborough and beyond to Broken Hill, in South Australia. This name covers many consecutive streets and is not widely known to most drivers except, as the entire allocation is still best known as by the names of its constituent parts: Willowie Road, Petersburg Road, and its concurrency along RM Williams Way. This article will deal with the entire length of the corridor for sake of completion, as well to avoid confusion between declarations.

It forms a route connecting the Augusta and Barrier Highways through the Flinders Ranges, and forms the most direct path between Port Augusta in South Australia (and following destinations like Alice Springs, Darwin, Kalgoorlie, and Perth) and Dubbo (and following destinations like Moree, Tamworth, Orange, and Newcastle), and hence provides the most direct link between Port Augusta and Sydney.

== Route ==
Willowie Road starts just outside Wilmington, off Horrocks Highway and progresses east along the northern stretches of the Clare Valley, and also through the Flinders Ranges. It passes through Orroroo, where it changes name to RM Williams Way, to Black Rock, where it changes name to Petersburg Road and continues through Peterborough to the small town of Ucolta, just off the intersection with the Barrier Highway.

== Major intersections ==
| LGA | Location | km | mi | Destinations | Notes |
|---|---|---|---|---|---|
| Mount Remarkable | Wilmington | 0.0 | 0.0 | Horrocks Highway (B56 north/B82 north, south) – Winninowie, Quorn, Gladstone | Western terminus of Willowie Road, route B56 continues north along Horrocks Highway through Wilmington |
| Mount Remarkable | Willowie | 20.3 | 12.6 | Booleroo Road – Booleroo Centre | |
| Orroroo Carrieton | Orroroo | 49.2 | 30.6 | RM Williams Way (B80 north) – Hawker | Concurrency with route B80 |
| Orroroo Carrieton | Black Rock | 61.1 | 38.0 | RM Williams Way (B80 south) – Jamestown, Spalding | Concurrency with route B80 |
| Peterborough | Peterborough | 84.8 | 52.7 | Beniah Road (B79 west) – Mannanarie, Gladstone | Eastern terminus of route B56, route B79 continues east along Petersburg Road |
| Peterborough | Peterborough | 85.8 | 53.3 | Cleary Road – Terowie | |
| Peterborough | Ucolta | 99.7 | 62.0 | Barrier Highway (A32) – Giles Corner, Burra, Broken Hill | Eastern terminus of Petersburg Road and route B79 |
Concurrency terminus; Route transition

== See also ==
- Highways in Australia
- List of highways in South Australia
