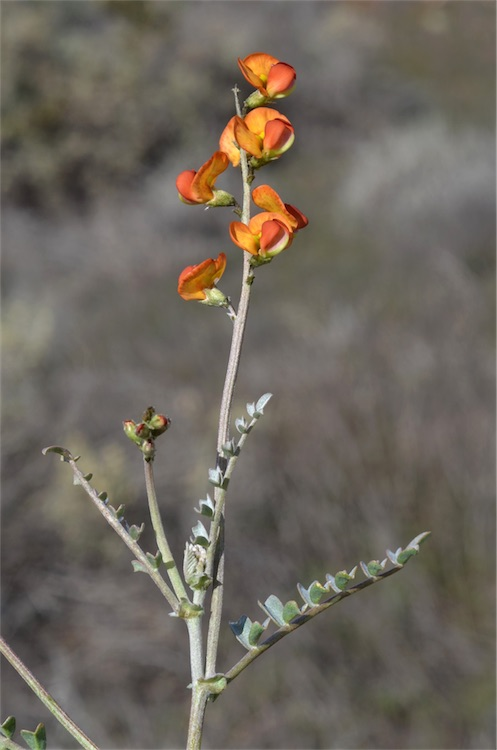
- Near the Barrier Highway

Scientific classification
- Kingdom: Plantae
- Clade: Tracheophytes
- Clade: Angiosperms
- Clade: Eudicots
- Clade: Rosids
- Order: Fabales
- Family: Fabaceae
- Subfamily: Faboideae
- Genus: Swainsona
- Species: S. stipularis

Binomial name
- Swainsona stipularis F.Muell.

Synonyms
- Swainsona phacaefolia F.Muell. nom. inval., nom. nud.; Swainsona phacifolia F.Muell. ex Benth. nom. illeg.; Swainsona stipularis var. geniculata J.M.Black nom. inval., nom. nud.; Swainsona stipularis F.Muell. var. stipularis; Swainsonia phacifolia F.Muell. orth. var.

= Swainsona stipularis =

Species of flowering plant

Swainsona stipularis is a species of flowering plant in the family Fabaceae and is endemic to southern continental Australia. It is a spreading to ascending perennial herb, with imparipinnate leaves with 5 to 11 broadly linear to heart-shaped leaflets, and racemes of mostly 5 to 20 usually orange-red flowers.

== Description ==
Swainsona stipularis is spreading to ascending perennial herb with imparipinnate leaves up to 70 mm (2.8 in) long with 5 to 11 broadly linear to heart-shaped leaflets with the narrower end towards the base, 30–90 mm (1.2–3.5 in) long, the lower leaflets mostly 1–25 mm (0.039–0.984 in) long and 1–3 mm (0.039–0.118 in) wide. There is a stipule about 15 mm (0.59 in) long at the base of the petiole. The flowers are arranged in racemes with up to 5 to 20 or more flowers on a peduncle 0.5–3 mm (0.020–0.118 in) wide, each flower 10–15 mm (0.39–0.59 in) long on a pedicel mostly 1–3 mm (0.039–0.118 in) long. The sepals are joined at the base, forming a tube 2.5–3.5 mm (0.098–0.138 in) long, the sepal lobes up to, or much shorter than the tube. The petals are orange-red, sometimes yellow or purple, the standard petal about 9–14 mm (0.35–0.55 in) long and 10–15 mm (0.39–0.59 in) wide, the wings 8–15 mm (0.31–0.59 in) long, and the keel usually 8–15 mm (0.31–0.59 in) long and 5 mm (0.20 in) deep. Flowering mainly occurs from September to November and the fruit is narrowly egg-shaped to spindle-shaped, 10–30 mm (0.39–1.18 in) long and 3–5 mm (0.12–0.20 in) wide with the remains of the style about 9 mm (0.35 in) long.

== Taxonomy ==
Swainsona stipularis was first formally described in 1853 by Ferdinand von Mueller in the journal Linnaea. The specific epithet (stipularis) means "of the stipules", referring to the long stipules.

== Distribution and habitat ==
This species of pea grows in stony, sandy or clay flats and is common near Broken Hill in New South Wales, widespread in the Flinders Ranges, central northern South Australia, and northwards to the south-west corner of Queensland. It is rare in Victoria, where it is listed as "critically endangered" under the Victorian Government Flora and Fauna Guarantee Act 1988.
