= Worlds End Highway =

Road in South Australia, Australia

Worlds End Highway South Australia
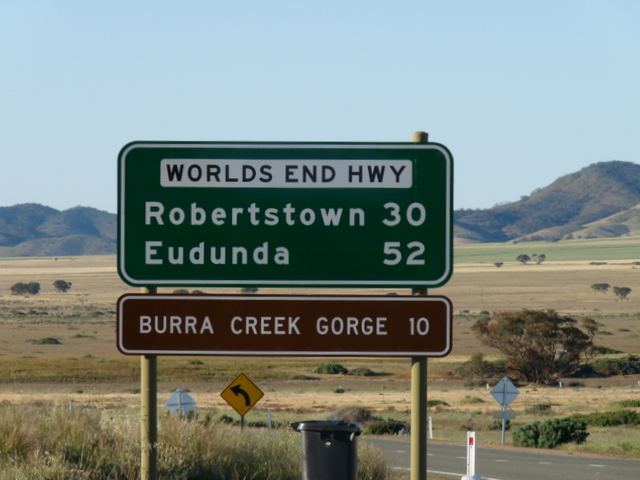
- Road distances sign at north end of Worlds End Highway
- Coordinates: 33.742237°S 139.057602°E (North end); 34.176524°S 139.083902°E (South end)

General information
- Type: Highway
- Length: 52 km (32 mi)
- Route number(s): B81 (1998–present)

Major junctions
- North end: Goyder Highway; Worlds End, South Australia
- South end: Thiele Highway; Eudunda, South Australia

Location(s)
- Region: Yorke and Mid North
- Major settlements: Robertstown

Highway system
- Highways in Australia; National Highway • Freeways in Australia; Highways in South Australia

Worlds End Highway is a road in the Yorke and Mid North region of South Australia running north from Eudunda through Robertstown to Goyder Highway 18 km southeast of Burra. The northern terminus of the highway is in a locality named Worlds End, leading to the name of the highway.

== Route ==
Worlds End Highway is entirely contained within the Regional Council of Goyder local government area.

| Location | km | mi | Destinations | Notes |
|---|---|---|---|---|
| Worlds End | 0 | 0.0 | Goyder Highway (B64) – Morgan, Renmark, Burra | Northern terminus of highway |
| Robertstown | 30 | 19 | Black Springs Road – Black Springs | Cross road: southbound traffic turns left to Main Road, northbound traffic turns right to Commercial Street |
| Eudunda | 52 | 32 | Thiele Highway (B81) – Kapunda, Morgan | Southern terminus of highway |
Route transition
