= Horrocks Highway =

Road in South Australia

Horrocks Highway South Australia
- Coordinates: 32.627516°S 137.916036°E (North end); 34.571589°S 138.746383°E (South end)

General information
- Type: Highway
- Length: 283 km (176 mi)
- Route number(s): B82 (1998–present); Entire route
- Former route number: National Route 83 (1955–1998) (Bungaree–Giles Corner); National Route 32 (1955–1998) (Giles Corner–Gawler)

Major junctions
- North end: Flinders Ranges Way; Quorn, South Australia
- Willowie Road; Wilkins Highway; Goyder Highway; RM Williams Way; Barrier Highway; Sturt Highway
- South end: Main North Road; Gawler, South Australia

Location(s)
- Region: Yorke and Mid North, Barossa Light and Lower North
- Major settlements: Wilmington, Gladstone, Clare, Giles Corner

Highway system
- Highways in Australia; National Highway • Freeways in Australia; Highways in South Australia

Horrocks Highway (formerly known as Main North Road) is a major north–south arterial route through regional South Australia, between Quorn in the Flinders Ranges, and Gawler, on the north-eastern fringe of suburban Adelaide.

== Route ==
Horrocks Highway commences at the intersection with Flinders Ranges Way in Quorn and heads in a southerly direction as a single carriageway, two-lane road, through the grain fields around the regional towns of Wilmingon at the eastern side of Horrocks Pass, continuing south to cross the Broughton River near Yacka. It leaves the southern Flinders Ranges, crosses the Hutt River and enters the northern end of the Clare Valley, with the dominant scenery changes from grain crops to grapevines from Clare to Auburn. Over the next ridge, it crosses the Wakefield River and returns to undulating land cleared for grain cropping then follows the Gilbert River to Giles Corner where Barrier Highway branches northeast towards Riverton and Burra. It crosses the Light River and the environment changes again, grain storage bunkers and silos to urban build-up, before eventually terminating at the interchange with Sturt Highway, and continues south into central Gawler and into suburban Adelaide as the remaining alignment of Main North Road.

As Horrocks Highway is in the valley between the southern Flinders Ranges and northern Mount Lofty Ranges, it is in the relatively wetter climate south of Goyder's Line.

== History ==
The highway follows the route established in the early years of the colony by explorer John Horrocks and was a major route for farmers and graziers to reach the capital, passing through rich farmland and the Clare Valley wine region.

Horrocks Highway was previously declared as part of Main North Road, from Wilmington to Gawler Belt; this section was renamed in 2011 to honour John Horrocks, an early explorer and pioneer in the region. Main North Road originally turned west in Wilmington through Horrocks Pass to join Augusta Highway in Winninowie; this has been separately declared as Horrocks Pass Road as part of route B56, while Horrocks Highway continues north beyond Wilmington as part of route B82 to Quorn.

== Major intersections ==
LGA	Location	km	mi	Destinations	Notes
Flinders Ranges	Quorn	0.0	0.0	Flinders Ranges Way (B83) – Stirling North, Hawker	Northern terminus of highway and route B82
Mount Remarkable	Wilmington	39.0	24.2	Horrocks Pass Road (B56 west) – Winninowie	Concurrency with route B56
Mount Remarkable	Wilmington	41.6	25.8	Willowie Road (B56 east) – Orroroo, Peterborough	Concurrency with route B56
Mount Remarkable	Melrose	68.3	42.4	White Wells Road – Booleroo Centre	
Mount Remarkable	Murray Town	77.7	48.3	Nukunu Yarta Way – Booleroo Centre	
Mount Remarkable	Murray Town	80.7	50.1	Germein Gorge Road – Port Germein	
Northern Areas	Laura	108.3	67.3	Possum Park Road – Crystal Brook	
Northern Areas	Gladstone	118.3	73.5	Wilkins Highway (B79) – Crystal Brook, Jamestown, Hallett	
Northern Areas	Gladstone	119.9	74.5	Crystal Brook–Broken Hill railway line	
Northern Areas	Gulnare	140.2	87.1	Goyder Highway (B64 west) – Crystal Brook	Concurrency with route B64
Northern Areas	Gulnare	142.3	88.4	Goyder Highway (B64 east) – Spalding, Burra, Renmark	Concurrency with route B64
Wakefield	Brinkworth	168.3	104.6	Condowie Plain Road – Snowtown	
Clare and Gilbert Valleys	Bungaree	178.1	110.7	Bungaree Road (north) – Bungaree	
Clare and Gilbert Valleys	Bungaree	180.9	112.4	RM Williams Way (B80) – Spalding, Jamestown	
Clare and Gilbert Valleys	Bungaree	186.6	115.9	Bungaree Road (south) – Bungaree	
Clare and Gilbert Valleys	Clare	193.1	120.0	Blyth Road – Blyth, Lochiel	
Clare and Gilbert Valleys	Clare	194.0	120.5	Farrell Flat Road – Hanson, Burra	
Clare and Gilbert Valleys	Auburn	218.3	135.6	Balaklava Road (B84 west) – Balaklava, Port Wakefield	Concurrency with route B84
Clare and Gilbert Valleys	Auburn	218.5	135.8	Saddleworth Road (B84 east) – Saddleworth	Concurrency with route B84
Wakefield River		223.2	138.7	Bridge over the river (bridge name unknown)	
Clare and Gilbert Valleys	Giles Corner	242.8	150.9	Barrier Highway (A32) – Burra, Hallett, Broken Hill	Northbound entrance to and southbound exit from Barrier Highway only
Clare and Gilbert Valleys	Tarlee	248.3	154.3	Tarlee Road – Kapunda	
Light River		258.1	160.4	Linwood Bridge	
Light	Templers	271.4	168.6	Owen Road (northwest) – Hamley Bridge, Owen, Balaklava; Templers Road (east) – Freeling	
Light	Gawler Belt	282.4	175.5	Thiele Highway (B81) – Freeling, Kapunda, Eudunda, Morgan	
Light	Gawler Belt	283.0	175.8	Sturt Highway (A20) – Adelaide, Nuriootpa, Renmark	
Light	Gawler Belt	283.0	175.8	Main North Road – Gawler, Salisbury, Gepps Cross, North Adelaide	Southern terminus of highway and route B82, continues south as Main North Road
1.000 mi = 1.609 km; 1.000 km = 0.621 mi: Concurrency terminus; Incomplete access; Route transition

== See also ==
- Highways in Australia
- List of highways in South Australia
- Highway 1 (Australia)
- Highway 1 (South Australia)
