= A32 road (Australia) =

A32 may refer to:

- Barrier Highway, a highway in New South Wales and South Australia, Australia
- Mitchell Highway, a highway in New South Wales, Australia (numbered A32 between Nyngan and Bathurst)
- Great Western Highway, a highway in New South Wales, Australia (numbered A32 between Lapstone and Bathurst)
