= Wilkins Highway =

Road in South Australia, Australia

Wilkins Highway South Australia
- Coordinates: 33.266894°S 138.153149°E (West end); 33.411325°S 138.892765°E (East end)

General information
- Type: Highway
- Length: 85.3 km (53 mi)
- Route number(s): (1998–present) (Warnertown–Jamestown); (1998–present) (Jamestown–Hallett)

Major junctions
- West end: Augusta Highway; Warnertown, South Australia
- Main North Road; RM Williams Way
- East end: Barrier Highway (Hallett, South Australia

Location(s)
- Region: Yorke and Mid North
- Major settlements: Gladstone, Caltowie, Jamestown

Highway system
- Highways in Australia; National Highway • Freeways in Australia; Highways in South Australia

Wilkins Highway is an east–west route across the Yorke and Mid North region of South Australia. It runs from Augusta Highway south of Port Pirie east to Barrier Highway at the town of Hallett, near where Sir Hubert Wilkins was born.

== Major intersections ==
LGA	Location	km	mi	Destinations	Notes
Port Pirie	Warnertown	0	0.0	Augusta Highway – Warnertown	Western terminus of highway and route B79
Port Pirie	Warnertown	6.8	4.2	Hughes Gap Road – Crystal Brook	
Port Pirie	Warnertown	8.6	5.3	Beetaloo Valley Road – Beetaloo Valley	
Northern Areas Council	Huddleston	11.6	7.2	Possum Park Road – Laura	
Northern Areas Council	Gladstone	19.2	11.9	Horrocks Highway (B82) – Wilmington, Clare	
Northern Areas Council	Caltowie	35.4	22.0	Laura–Caltowie Road – Laura	eastbound traffic turns right; westbound traffic turns left
Northern Areas Council	Jamestown	47.6	29.6	RM Williams Way (B80 north, south/B79 north) – Spalding, Orroroo, Peterborough	Route B79 continues west along Wilkins Highway, north along RM Williams Way; Western terminus of route B78
Regional Council of Goyder	Hallett	85.3	53.0	Barrier Highway – Burra, Broken Hill	Eastern terminus of highway and route B78
Route transition
