= Goyder Highway =

Road in South Australia

Goyder Highway South Australia
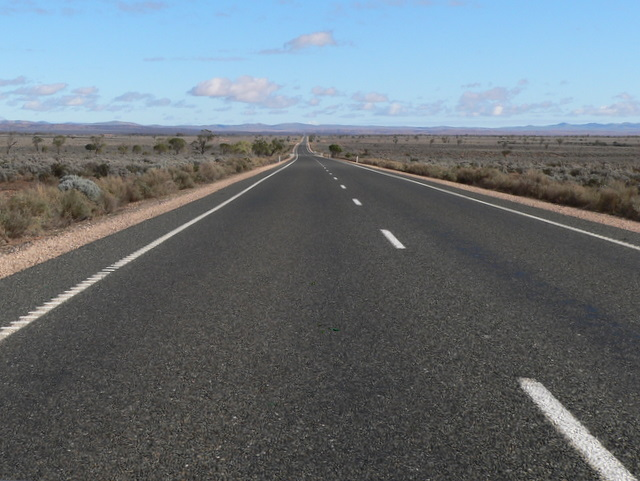
- Goyder Highway northwest of Morgan
- Coordinates: 33.326255°S 138.184198°E (West end); 34.235411°S 140.524380°E (East end)

General information
- Type: Highway
- Length: 266 km (165 mi)
- Route number(s): B64 (1998–present)
- Former route number: National Route 64 (1955–1998)

Major junctions
- West end: Augusta Highway; Crystal Brook, South Australia
- Main North Road; RM Williams Way; Barrier Highway; Worlds End Highway; Thiele Highway
- East end: Sturt Highway; Monash, South Australia

Location(s)
- Region: Yorke and Mid North, Murray and Mallee
- Major settlements: Crystal Brook, Spalding, Burra, Morgan

Highway system
- Highways in Australia; National Highway • Freeways in Australia; Highways in South Australia

Goyder Highway (B64) is a west–east link through the Mid North region of South Australia connecting Spencer Gulf to the Riverland. It is part of the most direct road route from Port Augusta (and areas beyond including Eyre Peninsula, Western Australia and the Northern Territory) to much of Victoria and southern New South Wales.

== History ==
Goyder Highway is named after George Goyder, a government surveyor who first identified and mapped Goyder's Line which indicates the northern limit of climatic suitability for intensive agriculture in South Australia. Goyder's Line is near the highway from Crystal Brook to past Burra.

== Route ==
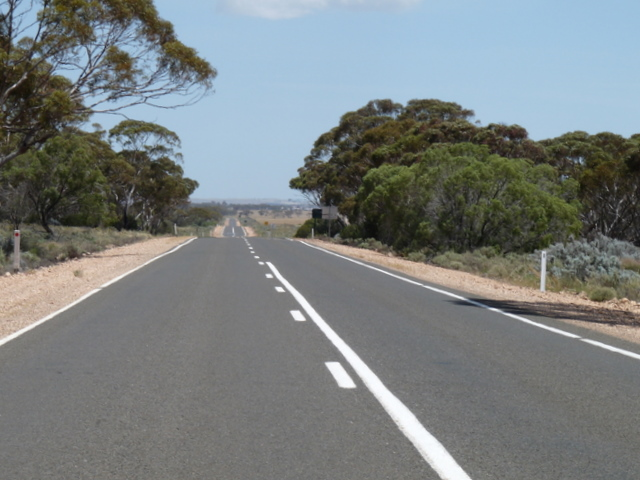
Goyder Highway northeast of Morgan

Goyder Highway starts from the Augusta Highway at Crystal Brook running east then southeast. It is briefly concurrent with Horrocks Highway near Gulnare, RM Williams Way near Spalding and Barrier Highway near Burra. The highway descends from the Mount Lofty Ranges onto the plains of the Murray–Darling basin. It passes the end of Thiele Highway at Morgan and continues upstream on the north side of the Murray River to meet Sturt Highway between Barmera and Monash.

== Major intersections ==
LGA	Location	km	mi	Destinations	Notes
Port Pirie	Crystal Brook	0.0	0.0	Augusta Highway (A1) – Port Augusta, Port Wakefield	Western terminus of highway and route B64
Port Pirie	Crystal Brook	4.0	2.5	Cunningham Street (northeast) – Crystal Brook; Eyre Road (southeast), to Huddleston Road – Gladstone	Cross road
Port Pirie	Crystal Brook	4.5	2.8	Gadd Avenue (Venning Road) (southwest) – Merriton; Darbon Terrance (Frith Road) (northwest) – Crystal Brook	Cross road
Northern Areas	Gulnare	29	18	Horrocks Highway (B82 north) – Gladstone, Quorn	Concurrency with route B82
Northern Areas	Gulnare	31	19	Horrocks Highway (B82 south) – Clare, Giles Corner, Gawler	Concurrency with route B82
Northern Areas	Spalding	47	29	RM Williams Way (B80 north) – Jamestown, Hawker	Concurrency with route B80
Northern Areas	Spalding	52	32	RM Williams Way (B80 south) – Clare	Concurrency with route B80
Goyder	Burra	86	53	Barrier Highway (A32 north) – Hallett, Broken Hill	Concurrency with route A32
Goyder	Burra	93	58	Barrier Highway (A32 south) – Giles Corner	Concurrency with route A32
Goyder	Worlds End	111	69	Worlds End Highway – Robertstown, Eudunda	
Mid Murray	Morgan	177	110	Thiele Highway (B81) – Morgan, Eudunda	Tee junction
Mid Murray	Stuart	187	116	Cadell Valley Road – Cadell	
Loxton Waikerie	Taylorville	210	130	Taylorville Road – Waikerie	
Berri Barmera	Barmera	253	157	Morgan Road – Barmera	
Berri Barmera	Monash	266	165	Sturt Highway (A20) – Barmera, Adelaide, Monash, Renmark	Eastern terminus of highway and route B64
Concurrency terminus; Route transition
