= RM Williams Way =

Road in South Australia

RM Williams Way South Australia
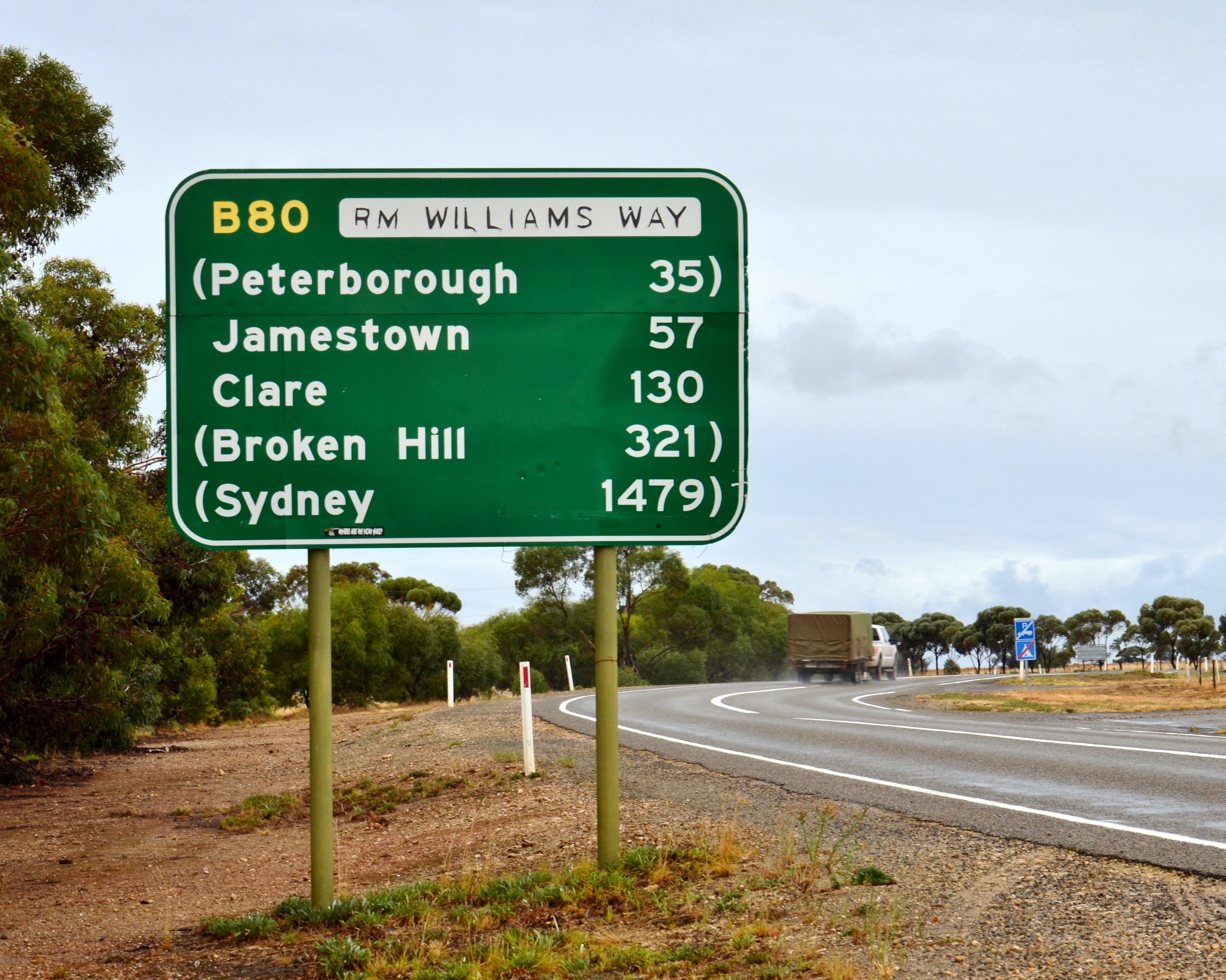
- RM Williams Way road sign at Orroroo
- Coordinates: 33.72°S 138.58°E (South end); 31.96°S 138.38°E (North end)

General information
- Type: Rural road
- Length: 214 km (133 mi)
- Route number(s): B80 (1998–present); Concurrencies: RM Williams Way (Jamestown–Mannanarie); Wilmington–Ucolta Road (Black Rock–Orroroo)
- Former route number: National Route 83 (1955–1998)

Major junctions
- South end: Horrocks Highway; Bungaree, South Australia
- Goyder Highway; Wilkins Highway; Beniah Road; Wilmington–Ucolta Road
- North end: Flinders Ranges Way; Hawker, South Australia

Location(s)
- Region: Yorke and Mid North
- Major settlements: Spalding, Jamestown, Orroroo, Carrieton

RM Williams Way (route B80) is a road through the Yorke and Mid North region of South Australia connecting Clare in the south through Spalding, Jamestown and Orroroo to Hawker in the Flinders Ranges. The road was named after R. M. Williams who had a strong association with the countryside through which it runs.

== Route ==
RM Williams Way branches from the Horrocks Highway (Main North Road) in Bungaree, about 13 km north of Clare. It runs roughly north to Spalding where it run concurrent with Goyder Highway for about 4 km as it continues north to Jamestown then Orroroo. It ends at the junction with the Flinders Ranges Way about 10 km out of Hawker.

The route runs in the same direction as the northern Mount Lofty Ranges and southern Flinders Ranges, but the climate changes over its length, becoming drier in the north, so the dominant agriculture and vegetation changes from more intensive farming, vineyards and grain crops in the south to pastoral grazing in the north.

== Major junctions ==
LGA	Location	km	mi	Destinations	Notes
Clare and Gilbert Valleys	Bungaree	0	0.0	Horrocks Highway (B82) – Clare	Southern terminus of road and route B80
Northern Areas	Spalding	25	16	Goyder Highway (B64 east) – Burra	Concurrency with route B64
Northern Areas	Spalding	26	16	Goyder Highway (B64 west) – Gulnare, Crystal Brook	Concurrency with route B64
Northern Areas	Jamestown	60	37	Wilkins Highway (B79 west) – Gladstone, Crystal Brook; Wilkins Highway (B78 east) – Hallett	Concurrency with route B79
Northern Areas	Mannanarie	78	48	Beniah Road (B79 east) – Yongala, Peterborough	Concurrency with route B79
Orroroo Carrieton	Black Rock	105	65	Wilmington–Ucolta Road (B56 east) – Peterborough	Concurrency with route B56
Orroroo Carrieton	Orroroo	117	73	Wilmington–Ucolta Road (B56 west) – Wilmington	Concurrency with route B56
Flinders Ranges	Hawker	214	133	Flinders Ranges Way (B83) – Hawker, Quorn	Northern terminus of road and route B80 10km south of Hawker
Concurrency terminus; Route transition
