= Flinders Ranges Way =

Road in South Australia

Flinders Ranges Way South Australia
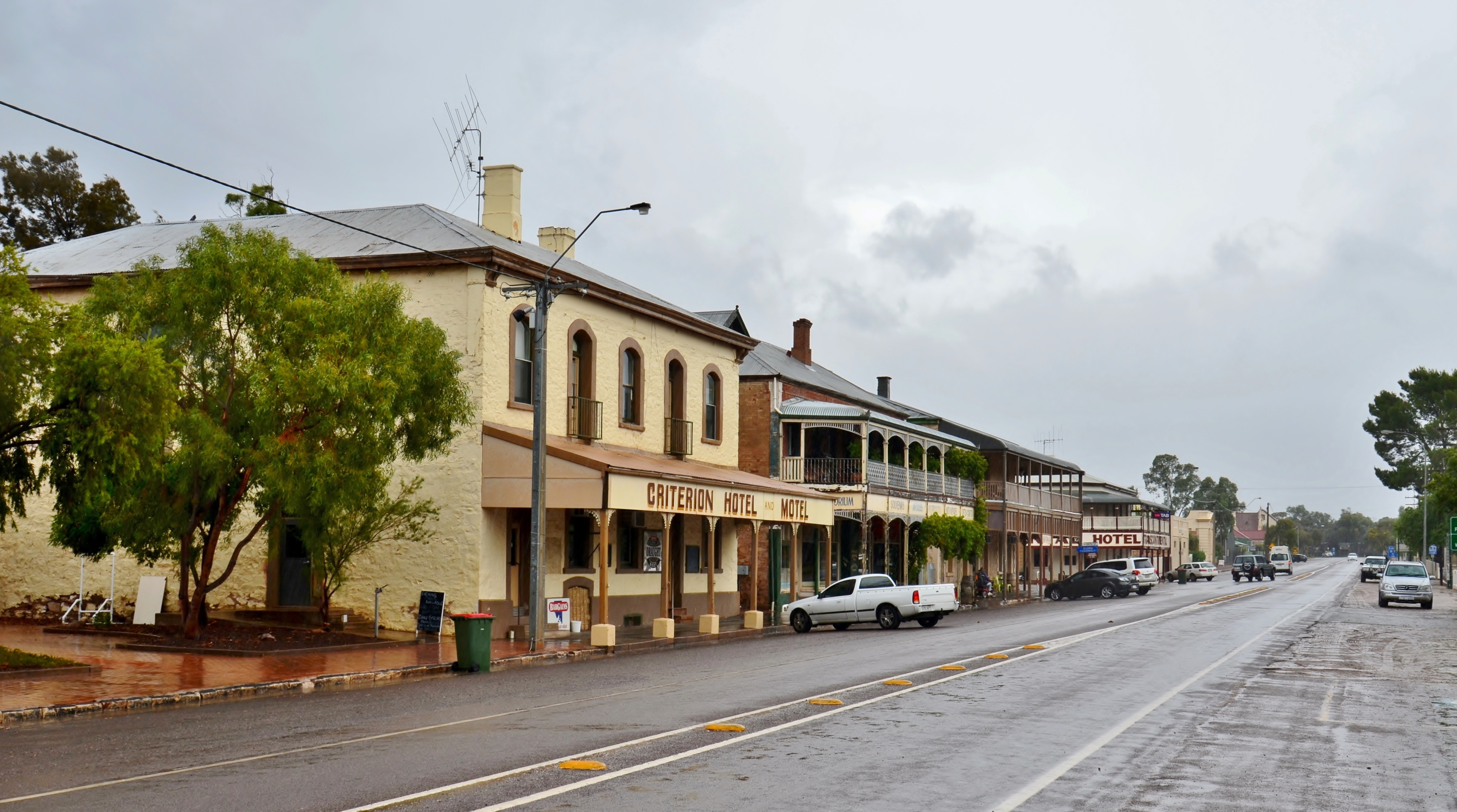
- Flinders Ranges Way in Quorn (where it is known as Railway Terrace)
- Coordinates: 32.521012°S 137.822114°E (South end); 31.095513°S 138.678815°E (North end)

General information
- Type: Rural road
- Length: 209 km (130 mi)
- Route number(s): B83 (1998–present) (Stirling North–Hawker)
- Former route number: National Route 47 (1955–1998) (Stirling North–Hawker)

Major junctions
- South end: Augusta Highway; Stirling North, South Australia
- Horrocks Highway; RM Williams Way; The Outback Highway
- North end: Parachilna Gorge Road; Blinman, South Australia

Location(s)
- Region: Far North
- Major settlements: Quorn, Hawker, Wilpena Pound

Flinders Ranges Way (route B83) is the main road route through the Flinders Ranges in South Australia. It starts from the Augusta Highway at Stirling North, 6 km southeast of Port Augusta. The Flinders Ranges Way extends 209 km to Blinman. Route B83 follows the Flinders Ranges Way through Quorn to Hawker, but then branches onto The Outback Highway along the western side of the ranges through Leigh Creek to Lyndhurst.

== Major junctions ==
LGA	Location	km	mi	Destinations	Notes
Port Augusta	Stirling North	0	0.0	Augusta Highway (A1) – Port Augusta	Southern terminus of road and route B83
Flinders Ranges	Quorn	33	21	Horrocks Highway (B82) – Wilmington, Gladstone	
Flinders Ranges	Hawker	90	56	RM Williams Way (B80) – Orroroo, Jamestown	
Flinders Ranges	Hawker	100	62	The Outback Highway (B83) – Leigh Creek	Route B83 continues north
Pastoral Unincorporated Area	Blinman	209	130	Parachilna Gorge Road – Parachilna Gorge	Northern terminus of road
Route transition
