= Tarlee, South Australia =

Tarlee
- Town
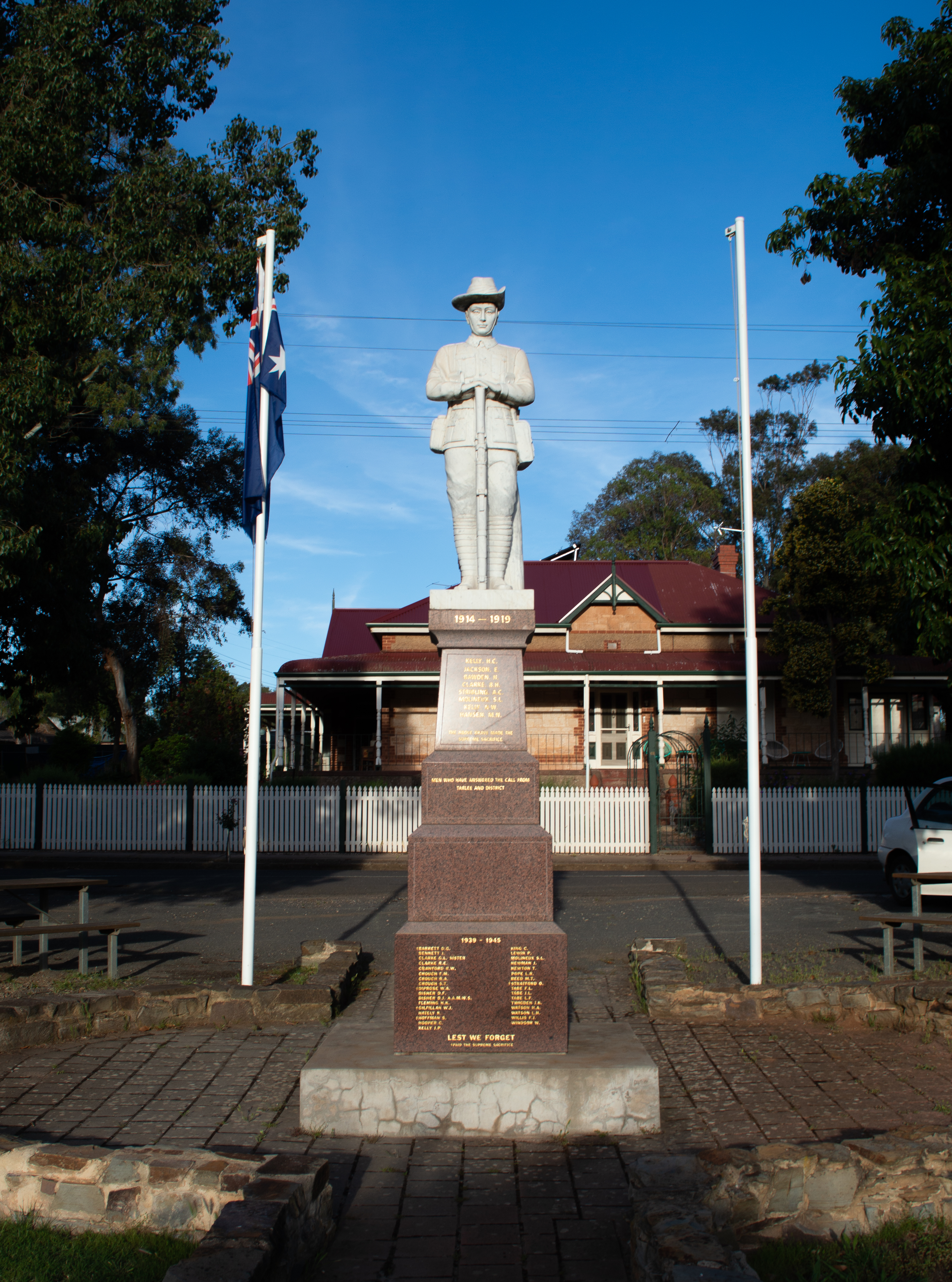
- Tarlee War Memorial

- Coordinates: 34°16′0″S 138°46′0″E
- Country: Australia
- State: South Australia
- Region: Mid North
- LGA: District Council of Clare and Gilbert Valleys
- Location: 8 km (5.0 mi) south-east of Giles Corner

Government
  - Mayor: Allan Aughey
  - State electorate: Frome
  - Federal division: Grey
- Elevation: 246 m (807 ft)

Population
  - Total: 316 (SAL 2021)
- Postcode: 5411
Localities around Tarlee
Giles Corner	Riverton	Hamilton
Alma	Tarlee	Allendale North
Stockport	Bethel	Kapunda

Tarlee is a town in South Australia. The origin of the name is uncertain, but it is thought to be a corruption of the name Tralee in Ireland. The township of Tarlee was advertised as readied for sale by auction in 1867. Tarlee is in the lower Mid North region where Horrocks Highway crosses the Gilbert River. It is approximately 8 km south of Giles Corner, where the Barrier Highway to Broken Hill diverges from the Horrocks Highway through the Clare Valley. At the 2016 census, Tarlee had a population of 302.

Tarlee was on the Peterborough railway line between Roseworthy junction and Burra. For a short period, Forrester's near Tarlee was the terminus as construction was authorised in two stages in the late 1860s.

The Tarlee institute building was opened in 1888.

Tarlee is in the District Council of Clare and Gilbert Valleys local government area, the South Australian House of Assembly electoral district of Frome and the Australian House of Representatives Division of Grey.
