= Black Rock, South Australia =

Town in South Australia

Black Rock South Australia
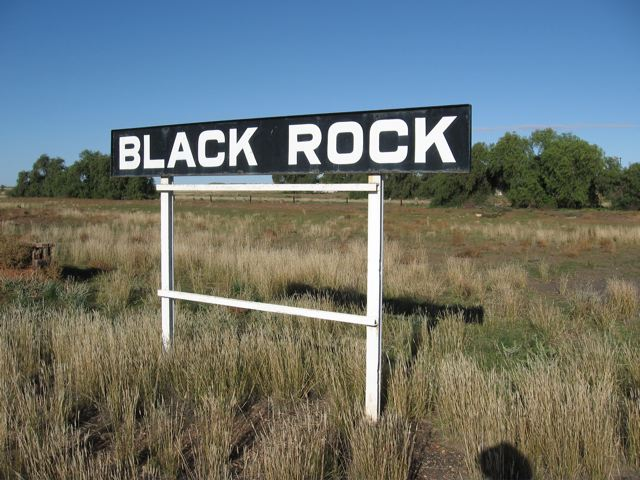
- Black Rock Station Sign

- Coordinates: 32°49′37″S 138°41′23″E
- Population: 36 (SAL 2016)
- Elevation: 435 m (1,427 ft)(railway station)
- Location: 256 km (159 mi) N of Adelaide; 108 km (67 mi) NE of Port Pirie; 107 km (66 mi) SW of Port Augusta
- LGA(s): District Council of Orroroo Carrieton
- State electorate(s): Stuart
- Federal division(s): Grey
Localities around Black Rock:
Orroroo	Orroroo	Minvalara
Pekina	Black Rock	Minvalara
Tarcowie	Yatina	Minvalara
- Footnotes: Adjoining localities

Black Rock (formerly known as Dalton) is a hamlet in South Australia on the Black Rock Plains at the intersection of the south–north RM Williams Way (B80) between Jamestown and Orroroo and the west–east Wilmington–Ucolta Road (B56) to Peterborough, in the Mid North section of the state.

It is also the site (and name of) a former railway siding on the now removed Peterborough–Quorn railway line.

== History ==
Located 19 km south east of Orroroo, the town was originally laid out as "Dalton" and proclaimed on 15 December 1881. It is named after a nearby hill identified by Captain E.C. Frome in 1842. The town was renamed "Black Rock" in 1940

== Railways ==
The railway line through Dalton was built in 1881, as part of the Great Northern Railway. In its day, Dalton was home to a gang, and a station master. The last commercial trains to operate through Black Rock were grain trains between Peterborough and Orroroo, in 1988.

The railway connecting Black Rock to Orroroo and Peterborough was removed in late 2008. However track was left in situ in the yard, and over the Black Rock Bridge, located approximately 1 km south. Black Rock Bridge, at 241 metres (792 feet), is the longest bridge on the old Peterborough Division

Black Rock Yard hosted the first of a proposed annual Kalamazoo race on 27 March 2010. The event was reported as being very successful.

== The town ==
Whilst people still live in Black Rock, the town is nearly empty.

A number of buildings still stand, including the Black Rock Hotel. This last traded commercially in the mid-1980s.

== Name ==
Governor Jervois named the town. He possibly named it after Charles James Dalton who, from 1829, was an officer in the Royal Artillery and a contemporary of Governor Jervois while serving in the Royal Engineers. Alternatively he may have named it after the English town of Dalton which translates as 'village in the dale (valley)’ or it may come from the Gaelic dall-dun – 'dark hill'.
