= List of highways in South Australia =

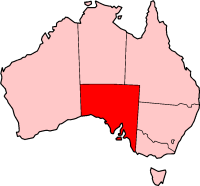
South Australia

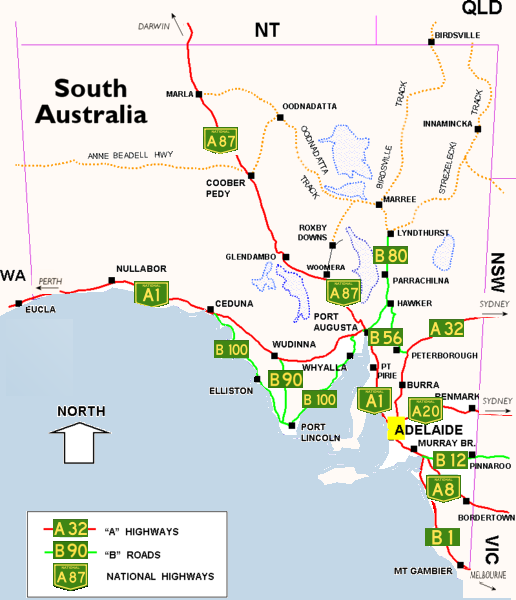
General highways map of South Australia

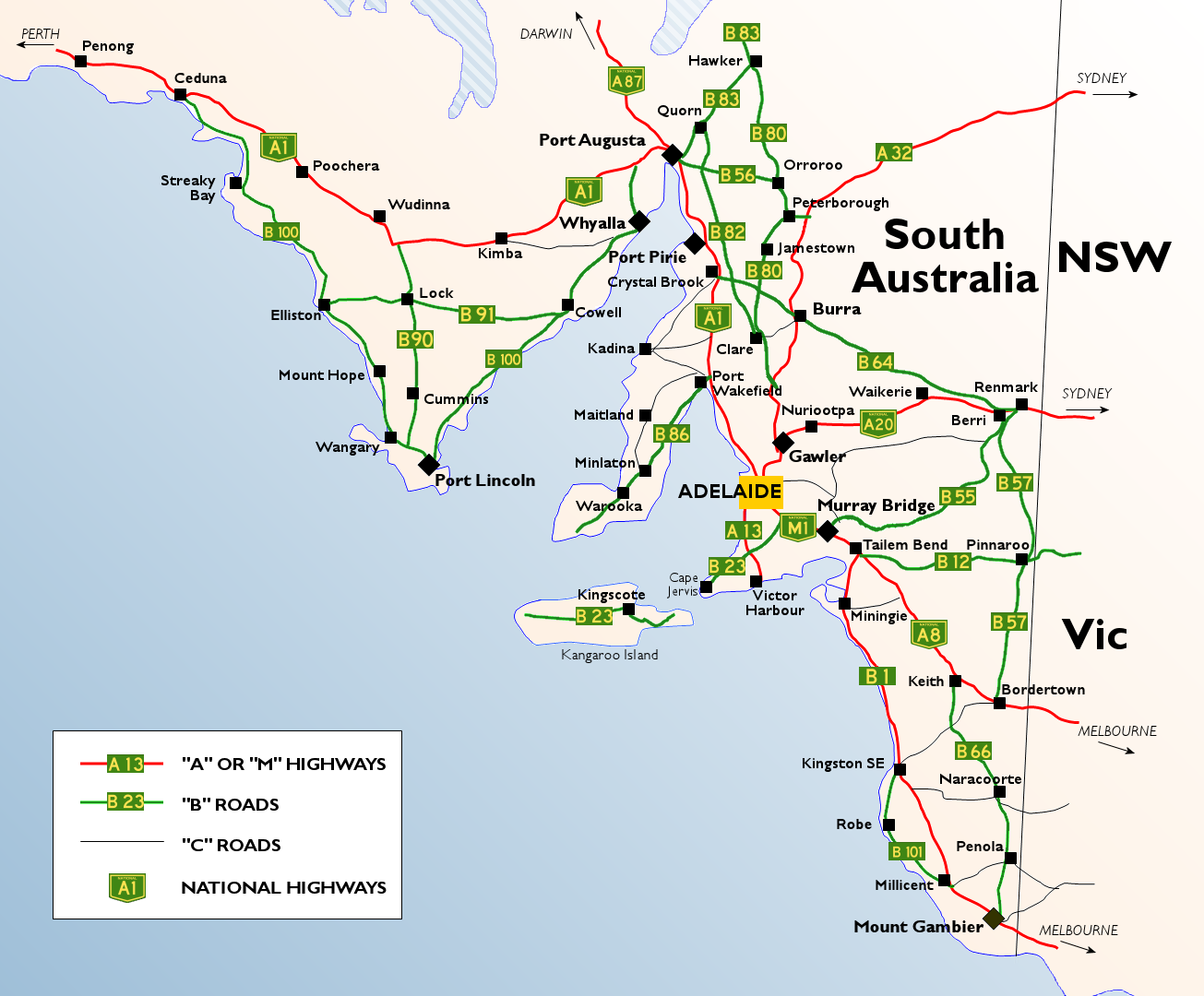
Highways of south eastern South Australia

South Australia is distinctly divided into two main areas; the well watered and populated southeastern corner and the arid outback for the rest of the state. As a result, highways are concentrated mainly in the southeast. The Eyre Highway to Perth and Stuart Highway to Darwin are the only significant highways for the remaining part of the state. The remaining roads are outback tracks. This is the list of highways in South Australia.

== Road numbering ==
Since 1955, South Australia had major rural roads numbered as part of national routes and Highways. In 1998/1999 South Australia introduced "Trailblazers" with A, B and M route numbers in the Metropolitan area and tourist areas of Victor Harbor and the Barossa Valley. This system was extended to cover country areas starting in 1999/2000.

These route numbers are used on signs and maps and distinct from the four digit numbers for major roads and eight digit numbers for streets used internally by the Highways Department.

== Expressways ==
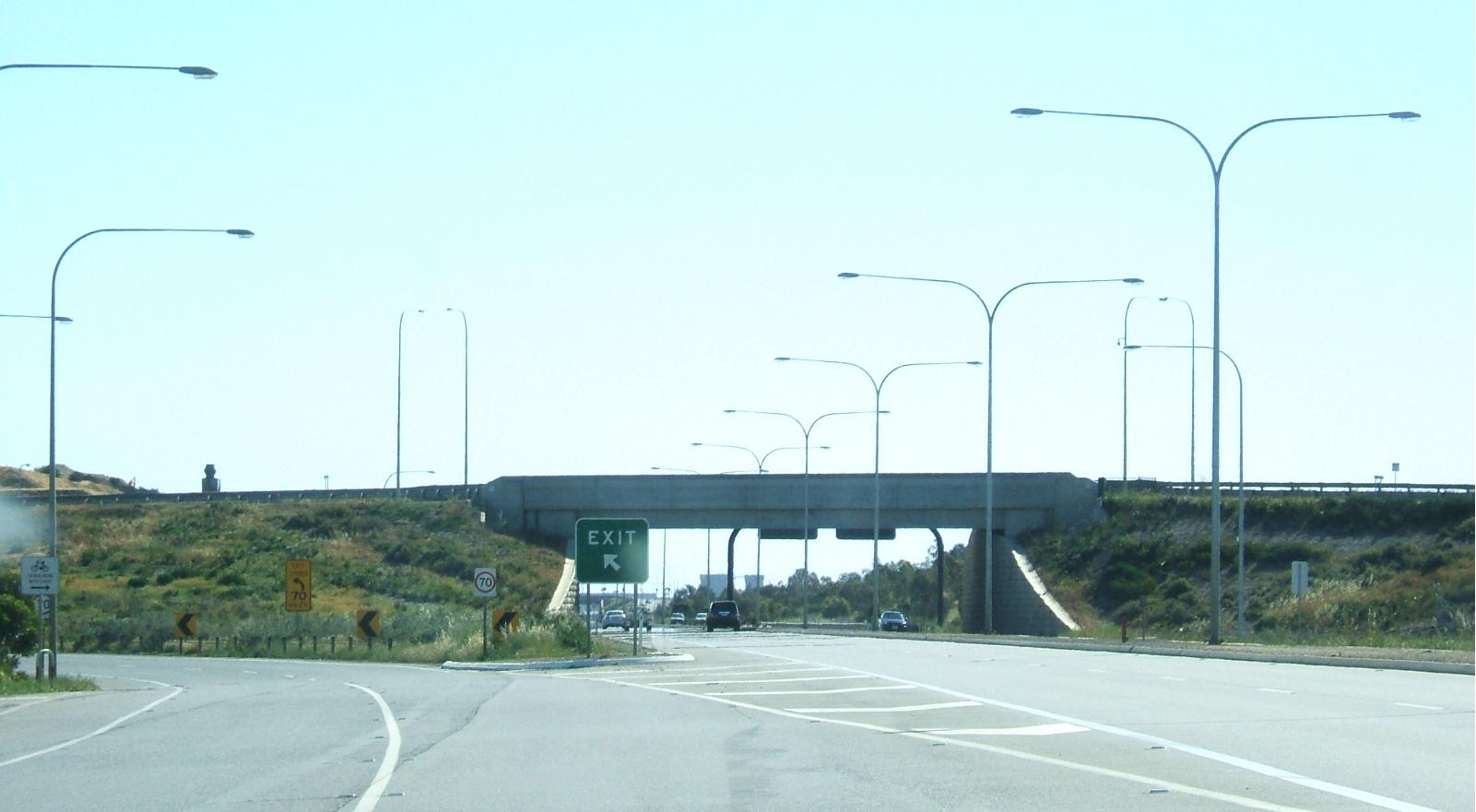
South Australian expressway A9 Port River Expressway

In South Australia, expressway may refer to a controlled access highway with no at-grade intersections or a limited access road of slightly lower standard with at-grade intersections at some locations. Currently there are three constructed expressways in Adelaide:

- Port River Expressway 5.5 km (3.4 mi), completed in 2008
- Northern Expressway 23 km (14 mi), completed in 2010
- North–South Motorway, made up of (from north to south)
  - the Northern Connector, 15.5 km (9.6 mi), completed in 2020;
  - the South Road Superway, 2.8 km (1.7 mi), completed in 2014;
  - the Regency Road to Pym Street stretch, 1.8 km (1.1 mi), completed in 2021;
  - the Torrens to Torrens, 4 km (2.5 mi), completed in 2018
  - the Torrens to Darlington project 10.5 km (6.5 mi), construction due to start 2023;
  - The Gateway South Project (extended the Southern Expressway from Darlington to Tonsley, completed 2019)
  - Southern Expressway 21 km (13 mi) (formerly the world's longest reversible one way freeway), completed in 1997, with duplication completed in 2014

== National highways ==
=== Metropolitan ===
- South Eastern Freeway northwestern end
- Northern Expressway
- Port Wakefield Road
- South Road
- Salisbury Highway
- Grand Junction Road
  - Hampstead Road
  - Taunton Road
  - Ascot Avenue
  - Lower Portrush Road
  - Portrush Road

=== Rural ===
- South Eastern Freeway – Majority
  - Eyre Highway
  - Augusta Highway
  - Port Wakefield Highway
  - Princes Highway
- Dukes Highway
- Sturt Highway
- Stuart Highway

== State highways ==
=== Metropolitan ===
- City Ring Route
- Port Wakefield Road
- Southern Expressway
- Main South Road
- Cross Road
- Anzac Highway
- Sir Donald Bradman Drive
- Port Road
- Port River Expressway
- Salisbury Highway
- North East Road (Adelaide–Mannum Road)
- Lower North East Road
- Marion Road
- Tapleys Hill Road
- Grand Junction Road
- Portrush Road
- Main North Road
- Torrens Road

=== Rural ===
- Princes Highway
- Princes Highway
- Mallee Highway
- Barossa Valley Way
  - Main South Road
  - Playford Highway
- Barrier Highway
- Karoonda Highway
- Wilmington–Ucolta Road
  - Browns Well Highway
  - Ngarkat Highway
  - Naracoorte Road
- Goyder Highway
- Riddoch Highway
- RM Williams Way
- Horrocks Highway

  - Flinders Ranges Way
  - The Outback Highway (links Hawker, Parachilna, Leigh Creek, Lyndhurst, Farina, Marree, Oodnadatta Track and Birdsville Track)
- Copper Coast Highway
- Yorke Highway
- St Vincent Highway
- Tod Highway
- Birdseye Highway
  - Flinders Highway
  - Lincoln Highway
- Southern Ports Highway

== Major arterial roads ==
  - Glen Osmond Road
  - Main North Road
- South Road
- Cross Road
  - Sir Donald Bradman Drive
  - Burbridge Road
- Port Road
  - Adelaide–Mannum Road
  - North East Road
- Victor Harbor Road
  - Tapleys Hill Road
  - Brighton Road
  - Ocean Boulevard
  - Lonsdale Road
  - Dyson Road
  - Grand Junction Road
  - Victoria Road
  - Mcintyre Road
  - Kings Road
  - Mount Barker Road
  - Strathalbyn Road
  - Onkaparinga Valley Road
  - Echunga Road
  - Battunga Road
  - Brookman Road
  - Old Willunga Hill Road (Brookman Rd to Victor Harbor Rd)
  - Victor Harbor Rd (Old Willunga Hill Rd to Pages Flat Rd, also A13)
  - Pages Flat Road
- Wellington Road
  - Main North Road
  - Wilmington–Ucolta Road
- Wilmington–Ucolta Road
- Main North Road

== Outback tracks ==
Although not highways as such, unsealed outback tracks form important links to remote communities and areas, the significant ones include;

- Anne Beadell Highway
- Birdsville Track
- Gunbarrel Highway
- Oodnadatta Track
- Strzelecki Track

== See also ==
- Highways in Australia for highways in other states and territories
- List of highways in Australia for roads named as highways, but not necessarily classified as highways
- Metropolitan Adelaide Transport Study
- List of numbered roads in South Australia
