= Augusta Highway =

Highway in South Australia

Augusta Highway South Australia
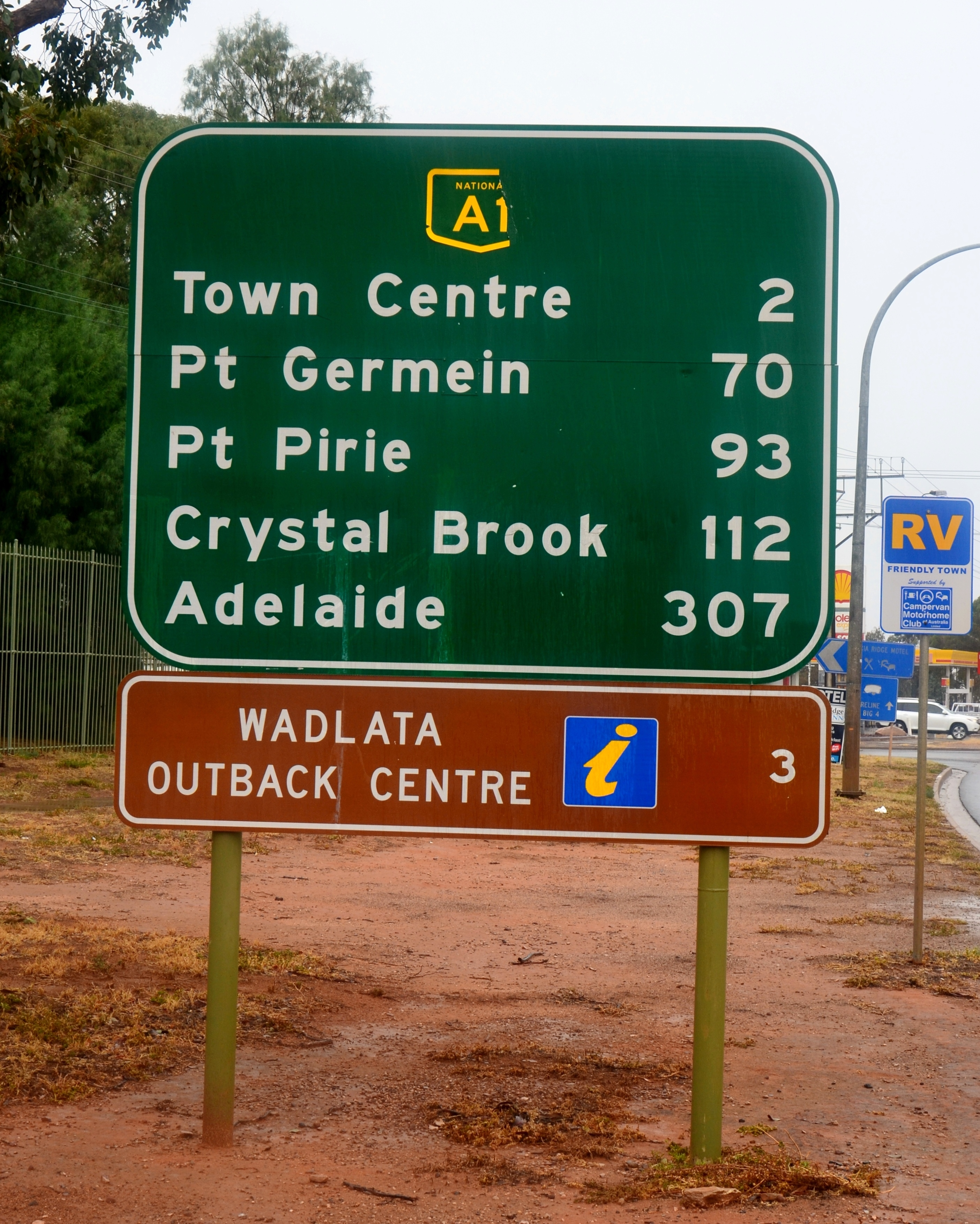
- Sign at the northern end of the Highway
- Coordinates: 32.480286°S 137.752896°E (North end); 34.162579°S 138.156759°E (South end)

General information
- Type: Highway
- Length: 208.1 km (129 mi)
- Gazetted: 2011
- Route number(s): A1 (2017–present)
- Former route number: National Highway A1 (2011–2017)

Major junctions
- North end: Eyre Highway; Port Augusta, South Australia
- Stuart Highway; Flinders Ranges Way; Main North Road; Spencer Highway; Wilkins Highway; Goyder Highway; Copper Coast Highway
- South end: Port Wakefield Highway; Port Wakefield, South Australia

Location(s)
- Region: Far North, Yorke and Mid North
- Major settlements: Port Germein, Port Pirie, Crystal Brook, Snowtown

Highway system
- Highways in Australia; National Highway • Freeways in Australia; Highways in South Australia

Augusta Highway is part of Australia's ring route (Highway 1) located in South Australia between Port Wakefield and Port Augusta. The highway is a key freight corridor connecting Adelaide with northern South Australia, the Northern Territory and Western Australia and carries a significant proportion of heavy vehicle traffic as part of the National Land Transport Network.

== Route ==
Augusta Highway starts at the intersection with Eyre and Stuart Highways in Port Augusta West, then crosses the northern section of Spencer Gulf into central Port Augusta. In Port Augusta, the highway follows Victoria Parade, which carries the Augusta Highway (A1) alignment through the urban area, before crossing Spencer Gulf via the Joy Baluch AM Bridge. It continues in a southerly direction as a single-carriageway highway with occasional overtaking lanes past Port Germein, Port Pirie, Crystal Brook and through Snowtown until it eventually meets Copper Coast Highway just north of Port Wakefield, where it continues south as Port Wakefield Highway.

=== Safety ===
In 2016, the Australian Automobile Association rated sections of the Augusta Highway as low risk between Port Augusta and Port Pirie, low–medium risk between Port Pirie and Snowtown, and medium–high risk between Snowtown and Port Wakefield.

== History ==
=== Early exploration ===
The region through which the Augusta Highway now passes was first explored by Europeans in the late 1830s. In 1839, Edward John Eyre travelled north from Adelaide through the Mid North of South Australia, passing through the area of present-day Crystal Brook, which he named after its clear watercourse. Eyre used the site as a base for further inland expeditions towards the Flinders Ranges and Spencer Gulf, contributing to early European knowledge of the region that would later be traversed by major transport routes.

=== Early road development ===
Following early exploration of the Mid North region in the late 1830s, overland routes began to develop to support pastoral expansion and settlement. Early roads were typically little more than informal bush tracks, often following existing routes established by Aboriginal people and later adapted by European settlers.

Contemporary accounts from the mid-19th century indicate that these routes were generally described as “good” for bush roads, despite very little formal improvement having been undertaken. One report noted that difficulties in transport were caused less by road conditions than by environmental factors such as the barrenness of the country and the scarcity of water for animals.

=== Early highway development ===
By the late 1920s, efforts were underway to improve the main north–south route between Adelaide and Port Augusta. In 1928, the Highways and Local Government Department announced plans to bituminise the Main North Road as far as Port Augusta, although work was delayed due to competing demands for road-building resources closer to Adelaide.

Despite these planned improvements, conditions remained variable. A 1929 report by the Royal Automobile Association described the route via Main North Road, Port Pirie and Port Wakefield as being in generally good condition, although some sandy sections and roadworks were still present.

Further upgrades were undertaken in the early 1940s, including reconstruction of sections of the road between Port Pirie and Port Germein using rubble macadam, with consideration given to later bitumen sealing. These works reflected increasing government involvement in improving major regional routes.

Conditions remained inconsistent in subsequent decades, as improvements struggled to keep pace with increasing traffic and environmental challenges. In 1949, sections of the road were reported to be in poor condition, with potholes affecting bitumen surfaces and some stretches rough or corrugated, while flooding and sand drift caused additional damage in exposed areas.

Upgrading continued into 1950, when the bituminisation of the road between Port Augusta and Port Pirie was nearing completion, leaving only short sections of gravel. Contemporary reports noted that the route was already widely used by heavy vehicles travelling between Adelaide and northern centres such as Whyalla and Woomera, and was expected to become the preferred route over alternatives despite some sections remaining in poor condition.

=== Late 20th-century changes ===
By the mid-20th century, the Adelaide to Port Augusta road had become an established route within South Australia’s highway network. Route markers for Highway One were extended north from Adelaide to Port Augusta in 1958, reflecting its importance as a key interstate link.

In November 1974, the Port Wakefield–Port Augusta Road was proclaimed part of the National Highway system under the National Roads Act, bringing federal funding and supporting further upgrades to the route.

During the early 1980s, improvements to the Adelaide–Port Augusta corridor were undertaken as part of the National Highway program, including planned realignments and bypasses to improve safety and traffic flow. A 1982 report outlined works including a deviation at Virginia–Two Wells and proposed bypasses of Crystal Brook, Port Pirie and Stirling North.

One of these projects, a four-lane bypass of Crystal Brook, was opened on 14 December 1988, diverting through traffic away from the town centre. The 9.4 km project formed part of the National Highway and was funded under the Australian Land Transport Program.

In 1998, South Australia introduced alphanumeric route numbering to replace earlier Highway 1 designations. Around the same time, proposals were made to rename sections of the state’s highway network, with a 1999 article recording suggestions such as Augusta Highway and Wakefield Highway for the route between Port Wakefield and Port Augusta.

=== Modern designation ===
The route was named Augusta Highway in 2011, having previously been part of Highway One. It had also been referred to as the Princes Highway, despite not being continuous with the Princes Highway in the southeast of the state.

=== Major upgrades ===
==== Port Wakefield overpass and highway duplication ====
Following the 2018 South Australian state election, upgrades were announced for both ends of the Augusta Highway. At the northern end, the Joy Baluch AM Bridge across Spencer Gulf at Port Augusta was to be duplicated to improve safety for both local and highway traffic. At the southern end, the contract for detailed design and construction of the duplication of the highway through Port Wakefield and a grade-separated intersection with the Copper Coast Highway was let in March 2020. Both projects were contracted to the Port Wakefield to Port Augusta Alliance (a consortium of CPB Contractors, Aurecon and GHD Group), with the government announcing an overpass for the intersection with Copper Coast Highway in 2021. Construction on both projects commenced in late 2020, with completion expected in 2022; the overpass to Copper Coast Highway opened in December 2021, four months ahead of schedule.

==== Port Wakefield to Lochiel duplication ====
A project to duplicate the highway between the Copper Coast Highway and Lochiel commenced in 2022 and was largely completed by March 2025, delivering dual carriageways over a 29 km section. The completion of this project resulted in dual two‑lane carriageways between Port Wakefield and Lochiel, significantly improving safety, travel times and freight efficiency along this section of the highway.

==== Ongoing and future upgrades ====
Following completion of the Port Wakefield to Lochiel duplication, further upgrades to the Augusta Highway are being delivered under the Augusta Highway Freight Highway Upgrade Program, a 10‑year program commencing in 2023. Works include intersection upgrades, pavement improvements, overtaking lanes and additional safety treatments along sections of the highway.

Planning is also underway for potential future duplication of sections of the highway north of Lochiel, including between Port Pirie and Crystal Brook, subject to funding and further study.

== Major intersections ==
LGA	Location	km	mi	Destinations	Notes
Port Augusta	Port Augusta West	0.0	0.0	Eyre Highway (A1 west) – Kimba, Ceduna, to Western Australia	Northern terminus of Augusta Highway, route A1 continues west along Eyre Highway
Port Augusta	Port Augusta West	0.0	0.0	Stuart Highway (A87 north) – Pimba, Coober Pedy, to the Outback and Northern Territory	
Spencer Gulf		0.8– 1.5	0.50– 0.93	Joy Baluch AM Bridge	
Port Augusta	Port Augusta	1.7	1.1	Trans-Australian Railway	
Port Augusta	Port Augusta	3.8	2.4	Adelaide–Port Augusta railway line	
Port Augusta	Stirling North	8.2	5.1	Flinders Ranges Way (B83) – Quorn, Hawker	
Port Augusta	Winninowie	23.2	14.4	Horrocks Pass Road (B56) – Wilmington	
Mount Remarkable	Port Germein	64.9	40.3	Port Germein Road – Port Germein	
Mount Remarkable	Port Germein	65.5	40.7	Adelaide–Port Augusta railway line	
Mount Remarkable	Port Germein	68.0	42.3	Germein Gorge Road – Murray Town	
Mount Remarkable	Port Germein	68.8	42.8	Port Germein Road – Port Germein	
Port Pirie	Napperby	86.9	54.0	Spencer Highway (B89) – Port Pirie, Wallaroo, Minlaton	
Port Pirie	Bungama	90.5	56.2	Warnertown Road – Port Pirie	
Port Pirie	Warnertown	101.2	62.9	Wilkins Highway (B79) – Laura, Gladstone	
Port Pirie	Crystal Brook	108.6	67.5	Goyder Highway (B64) – Crystal Brook, Burra, Morgan, Renmark	
Port Pirie	Crystal Brook	109.2	67.9	Adelaide–Port Augusta railway line	
Port Pirie	Crystal Brook	115.3	71.6	Venning Road – Crystal Brook, Gladstone	
Port Pirie	Merriton	120.7	75.0	Clements Road – Port Broughton	
Wakefield	Snowtown	161.1	100.1	Condowie Plain Road – Brinkworth, Blyth	
Wakefield	Snowtown	163.2	101.4	Barunga Gap Road – Bute, Kadina	
Wakefield	Lochiel	179.3	111.4	Ninnes Road – Paskeville, Moonta	
Wakefield	Lochiel	179.6	111.6	Blyth Road – Blyth, Clare	
Wakefield	Port Wakefield	208.1	129.3	Copper Coast Highway (B85 west) – Kadina, Wallaroo	Trumpet Interchange
Wakefield	Port Wakefield	208.1	129.3	Port Wakefield Highway (A1 south) – Adelaide	Southern terminus of Augusta Highway, route A1 continues south along Port Wakefield Highway
Route transition
