= Barrier Highway =

Highway in New South Wales and South Australia

Barrier Highway South Australia–New South Wales
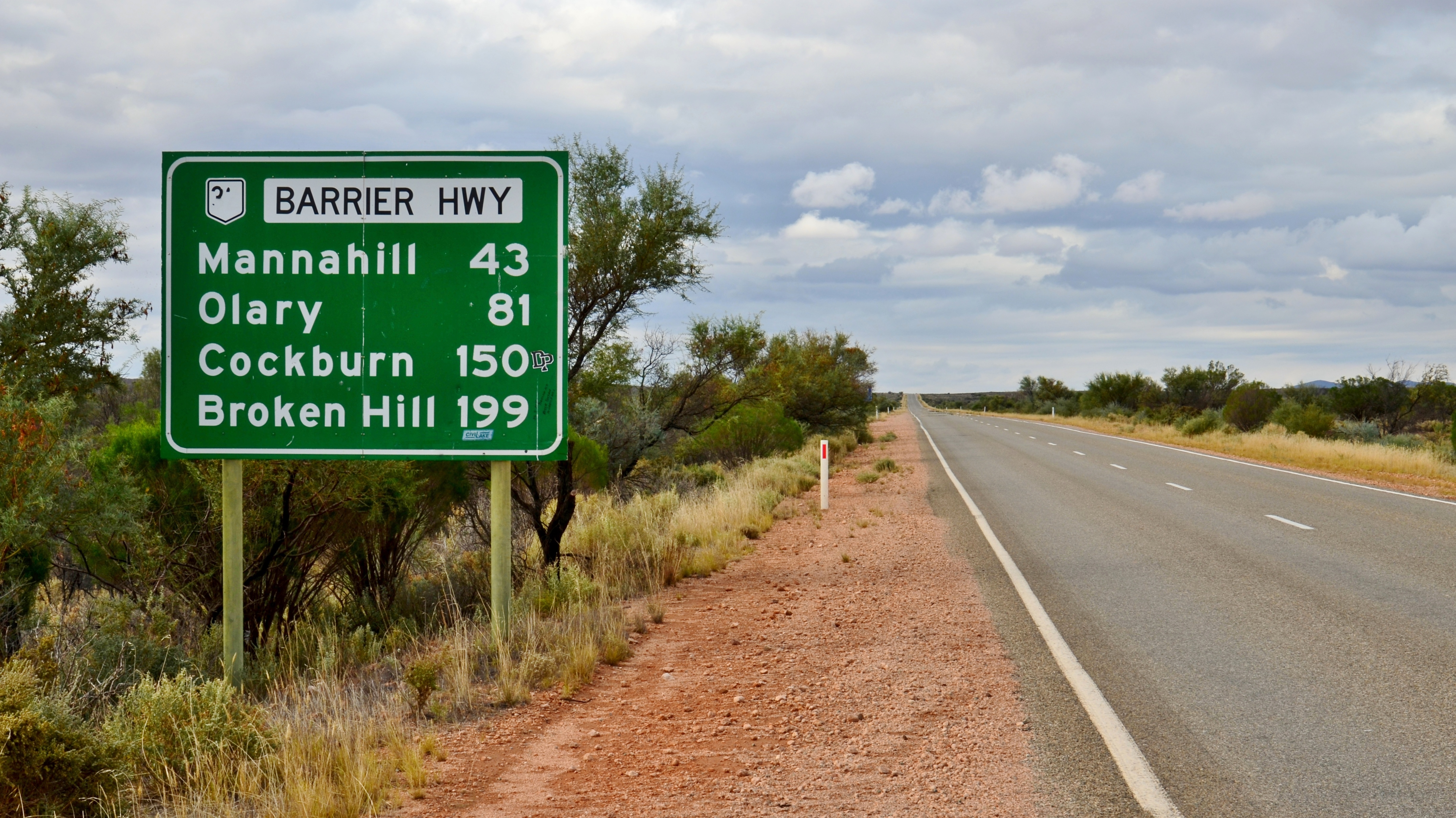
- Highway sign, Yunta
- Coordinates: 34.231740°S 138.738964°E (West end); 31.554085°S 147.179334°E (East end)

General information
- Type: Highway
- Length: 1,012 km (629 mi)
- Gazetted: August 1928 (NSW, as Main Road 8)
- Route number(s): A32 (1998/2013–present)
- Former route number: National Route 32 (1955–1998/2013)

Major junctions
- West end: Horrocks Highway; Giles Corner, South Australia
- Saddleworth Road; Goyder Highway; Wilmington–Ucolta Road; Silver City Highway; Cobb Highway; Kidman Way
- East end: Mitchell Highway; Nyngan, New South Wales

Location(s)
- Region: Yorke and Mid North, Far North, Far West
- Major settlements: Saddleworth, Burra, Peterborough, Yunta, Broken Hill, Wilcannia, Cobar

Highway system
- Highways in Australia; National Highway • Freeways in Australia; Highways in South Australia; Highways in New South Wales

Barrier Highway is a highway in South Australia and New South Wales, and is designated part of route A32. The name of the highway is derived from the Barrier Ranges, an area of moderately high ground in the far west of New South Wales, through which the highway traverses.

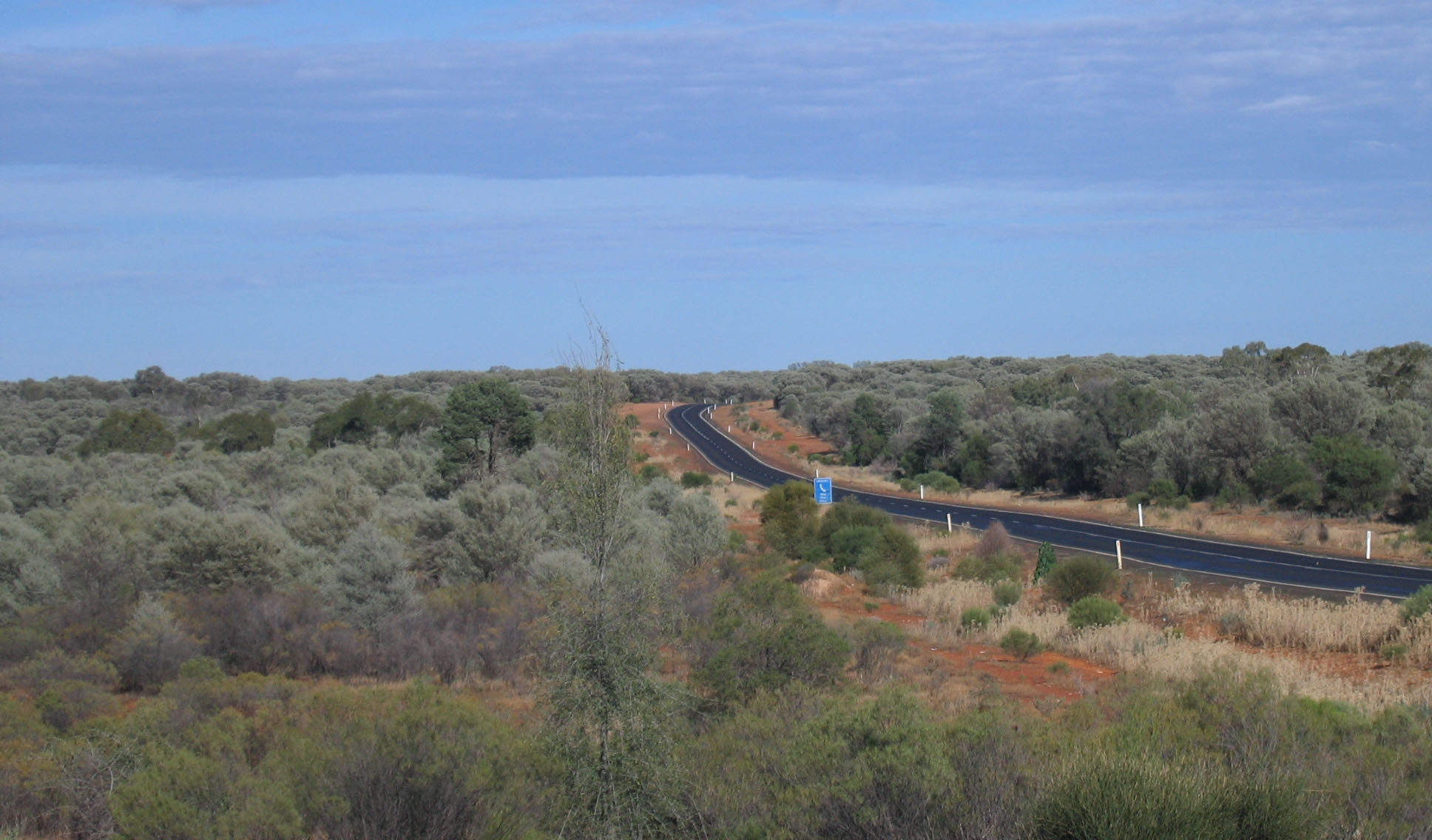
Barrier Highway near Cobar

== Route ==
Barrier Highway branches off Horrocks Highway at Giles Corner, between Riverton and Tarlee and heads northeast, crossing the border into New South Wales and passing through Broken Hill. It continues further east to Wilcannia where it crosses the Darling River, past Cobar to eventually end in Nyngan, where it joins Mitchell Highway. The area traversed by the highway is remote and very sparsely settled.

== History ==
The passing of the Main Roads Act of 1924 through the Parliament of New South Wales provided for the declaration of Main Roads, roads partially funded by the State government through the Main Roads Board (later Transport for NSW). Barrier Highway was declared (as Main Road No. 8) on 8 August 1928, from the intersection with North-Western Highway (today Mitchell Highway) in Nyngan, via Cobar, Willcannia, and Broken Hill, to the border with South Australia; with the passing of the Main Roads (Amendment) Act of 1929 to provide for additional declarations of State Highways and Trunk Roads, this was amended to State Highway 8 in April 1929.

The highway was fully sealed in October 1972.

The passing of the Roads Act of 1993 through the Parliament of New South Wales, updated road classifications and the way they could be declared within New South Wales. Under this act, Barrier Highway today retains its declaration as Highway 8, from Nyngan to the state border with South Australia.

Barrier Highway was signed as National Route 32 across its entire length in 1955. With both states' conversion to their newer alphanumeric systems in 1998 and 2013, its former route number was updated to A32 for the highway within South Australia in 1998, and within New South Wales in 2013.

== Major intersections ==
| State | LGA | Location | km | mi | Destinations | Notes |
|---|---|---|---|---|---|---|
| South Australia | Clare and Gilbert Valleys | Giles Corner | 0 | 0.0 | Horrocks Highway (B82) – Tarlee, Auburn | Western terminus of highway and route A32 |
| South Australia | Clare and Gilbert Valleys | Saddleworth | 17.6 | 10.9 | Saddleworth Road (B84 east) – Marrabel, Eudunda | Concurrency with route B84 |
| South Australia | Clare and Gilbert Valleys | Saddleworth | 18.3 | 11.4 | Saddleworth Road (B84 west) – Auburn, Port Wakefield | Concurrency with route B84 |
| South Australia | Goyder | Hanson | 56.9 | 35.4 | Farrell Flat Road – Farrell Flat, Clare | |
| South Australia | Goyder | Burra | 71.6 | 44.5 | Goyder Highway (B64 east) – Morgan, Waikerie | Concurrency with route B64 |
| South Australia | Goyder | Burra | 78.4 | 48.7 | Goyder Highway (B64 west) – Spalding, Crystal Brook | Concurrency with route B64 |
| South Australia | Goyder | Hallett | 102 | 63 | Wilkins Highway (B78 west) – Jamestown; Jessie Street (east) – Hallett | |
| South Australia | Peterborough | Ucolta | 156 | 97 | Petersburg Road (B79) – Peterborough, Wilmington, Port Augusta | |
| South Australia | Peterborough | Ucolta | 157 | 98 | Crystal Brook–Broken Hill railway line | |
| South Australia | Pastoral Unincorporated Area | Yunta | 227 | 141 | Yunta–Waukaringa Road – Waukaringa | |
| South Australia | Pastoral Unincorporated Area | Bindarrah | 339 | 211 | Crystal Brook–Broken Hill railway line | |
| South Australia | Pastoral Unincorporated Area | Cockburn | 373 | 232 | Crystal Brook–Broken Hill railway line | |
| State border | | | 377 | 234 | South Australia – New South Wales border | |
| New South Wales | Broken Hill | Broken Hill | 423 | 263 | Brookfield Avenue, to Silverton Road (northwest) – Silverton; Galena Street (southeast) – Broken Hill | Roundabout |
| New South Wales | Broken Hill | Broken Hill | 425 | 264 | Williams Street (northeast) – Tibooburra; Iodide Street (northwest) – Broken Hill | |
| New South Wales | Broken Hill | Broken Hill | 426 | 265 | Iodide Street (B79 southeast) – Wentworth, Mildura; Argent Street (southwest) – Broken Hill | |
| New South Wales | Broken Hill | Broken Hill | 427 | 265 | Menindee Road – Menindee | |
| New South Wales | Central Darling | Wilcannia | 620 | 390 | White Cliffs Road – White Cliffs | |
| New South Wales | Central Darling | Wilcannia | 621 | 386 | West Wilcannia Road (west) – Menindee; West Tilpa Road (east) – Tilpa, Louth, Bourke | |
| New South Wales | Darling River | | 622 | 386 | Bridge over river | |
| New South Wales | Central Darling | Wilcannia | 641 | 398 | Cobb Highway (B75) – Ivanhoe, Hay, Echuca | |
| New South Wales | Cobar | Cobar | 882 | 548 | Kidman Way (B87 north) – Bourke | Concurrency with route B87 |
| New South Wales | Cobar | Cobar | 883 | 549 | Kidman Way (B87 south) – Hillston, Griffith | Concurrency with route B87 |
| New South Wales | Bogan | Hermidale | 947 | 588 | Cobar railway line | |
| New South Wales | Bogan | Hermidale | 966 | 600 | Hermidale–Nymagee Road – Nymagee | |
| New South Wales | Bogan | Nyngan | 1,011 | 628 | Cobar railway line | |
| New South Wales | Bogan | Nyngan | 1,012 | 629 | Mitchell Highway (A32 southeast, B71 northwest) – Bourke, Charleville, Dubbo, Bathurst | Eastern terminus of highway Route A32 continues southwest along Mitchell Highway |
1.000 mi = 1.609 km; 1.000 km = 0.621 mi: Concurrency terminus; Route transition

== See also ==
- Highways in Australia
- List of highways in New South Wales
- List of highways in South Australia
