= Giles Corner, South Australia =

Giles Corner South Australia
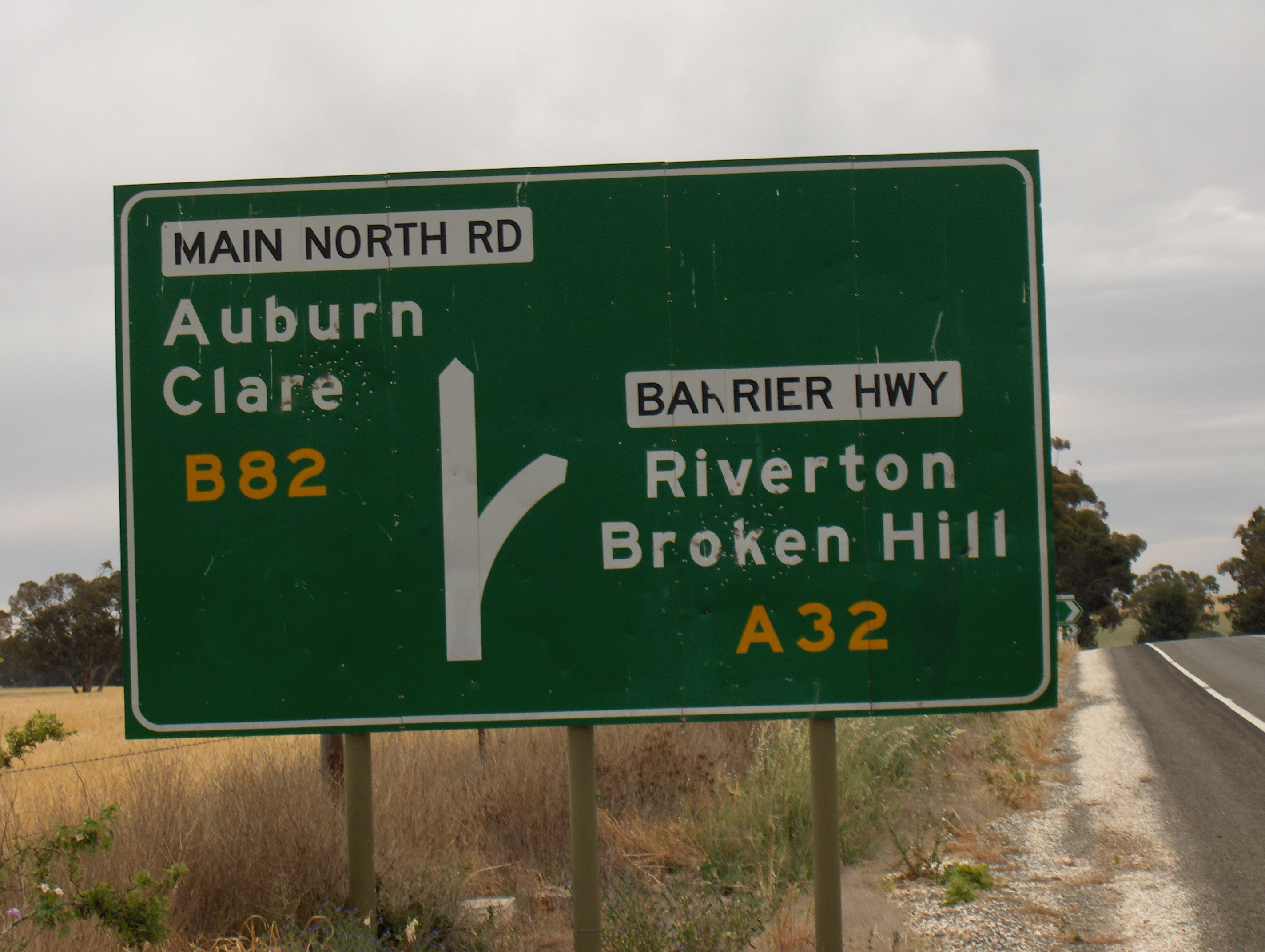
- Turnoff to the Barrier Highway, just south of Giles Corner

- Coordinates: 34°13′0″S 138°43′0″E
- Population: 26 (SAL 2021)
- Postcode(s): 5411
- Location: 8 km (5 mi) north-west of Tarlee
- LGA(s): District Council of Clare and Gilbert Valleys
- Region: Mid North
- State electorate(s): Frome
- Federal division(s): Grey
Localities around Giles Corner:
Rhynie		Riverton
Salter Springs	Giles Corner
Alma		Tarlee

Giles Corner (formerly Giles' Corner) (Postcode 5411) is the name of the intersection of Main North Road (now called Horrocks Highway) and the Barrier Highway, halfway between the towns of Tarlee and Rhynie. The Barrier Highway branches off from Horrocks Highway at this location, heading north towards Riverton, Burra and eventually Broken Hill. Horrocks Highway continues in a northerly direction, on to the towns of Rhynie, Auburn and Clare. There is also an unsealed back road starting just north of the junction which heads west and ends at the road between Balaklava and Owen, approximately 20 kilometres away. Although not a town, Giles Corner is sign posted to mark its location.

The name is in honour of Thomas Giles, one of the fifteen sons (and six daughters) of William Giles, Colonial Manager of the South Australian Company (1841-1860). Thomas Giles was a business partner of George Alexander Anstey, who was an early pastoralist on the Yorke Peninsula and is remembered by the landmark Anstey Hill Recreation Park in the Adelaide Hills, overlooking the Adelaide suburb of Hope Valley.

Giles Corner was the site of a Wesleyan church built in 1867–8 on land donated by Edward Furness and stone donated by Giles. The congregation had been meeting in a private house. In 1900 it became a Methodist chapel and was enlarged in 1903. A school hall was built alongside the church in 1927. The church remained in use until the final service held on 4 October 1959. Owing to vandalism the buildings were later demolished and now a house stands on the site. In June 2016 a memorial was erected by the road side.
