= Spalding, South Australia =

Spalding
- Town
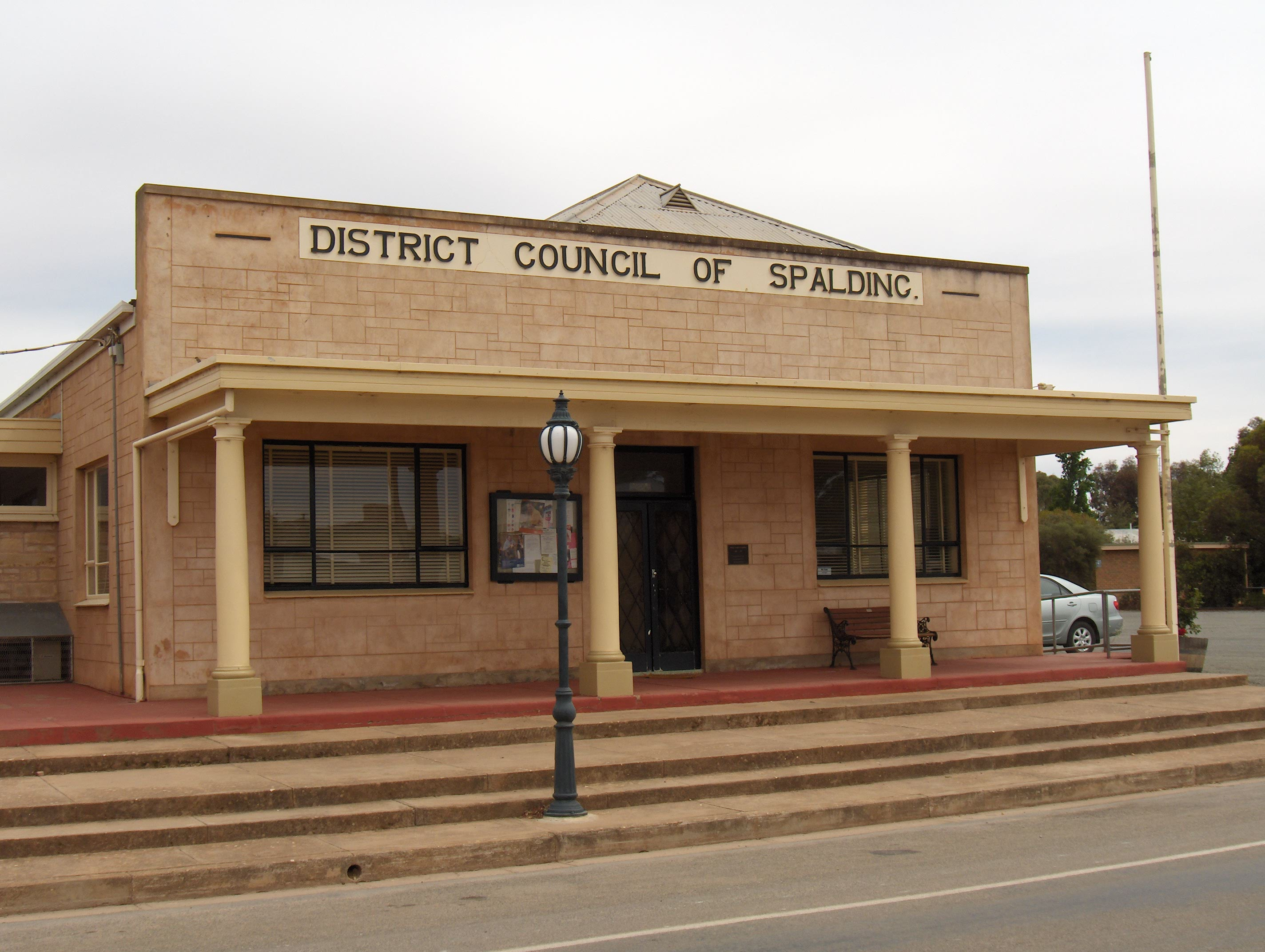
- The former "District Council of Spalding" council chambers

- Coordinates: 33°29′0″S 138°36′0″E
- Country: Australia
- State: South Australia
- LGA: Northern Areas Council
- Established: 1885 (district council proclaimed)

Government
  - State electorate: Stuart
  - Federal division: Grey
- Elevation: 309 m (1,014 ft)

Population
  - Total: 194 (UCL 2021)
- Postcode: 5454

Spalding is a town located north of the Clare Valley in South Australia, Australia. At the 2016 census, Spalding had a population of 215.

It is mainly a farming community and also is home to a slate quarry.

Services in the town include a supermarket, hotel, school, gun supplies store, roadhouse, Country Fire Service station, South Australian State Emergency Service (SES) unit, dedicated post office and police station.

== History ==
Prior to 1869, there were five sheep runs in the Spalding area: Bundaleer, Booborowie, Canowie, Hill River and Bungaree. From this date, the Spalding area was made available to farmers and a farming-centred community grew.

In 1875, early settler W.E. Lunn opened the first post office, and in the following year subdivided part of section 393 into fifteen allotments. He named Spalding after his birthplace, the market town of Spalding, Lincolnshire in the UK.

On 30 July 1885, the District Council of Spalding was proclaimed; it remained until 1997, when it merged into the Northern Areas Council.

Spalding was serviced by a broad gauge railway line through the Clare Valley from Adelaide from its construction in 1922 until the last train in 1978.

The historic Spalding Railway Bridge over the Broughton River and Bundaleer Reservoir site are both listed on the South Australian Heritage Register.

== Feature of interest ==
- The Heysen Trail runs past Spalding, which is approximately the midpoint of the 1200 km walking route.
