= Highway 1 (Northern Territory) =

Route number in the Northern Territory

Highway 1 Northern Territory

- Map of the Northern Territory with Highway 1 highlighted in red

General information
- Type: Highway
- Opened: 1955
- Route number(s): National Highway 1 (Victoria and Stuart Highways); National Route 1 (Carpentaria Highway)

Major junctions
- NT/WA border end: near Kununurra
- WA to QLD: Buchanan Highway; Buntine Highway; Central Arnhem Road; Roper Highway; Stuart Highway; Darwin spur: Kakadu Highway; Dorat Road; Cox Peninsula Road; Arnhem Highway; Tiger Brennan Drive
- NT/QLD border end: near Wollogorang

Location(s)
- Major settlements: Katherine, Darwin (via spur), Daly Waters

Highway system
- Highways in Australia; National Highway • Freeways in Australia; Highways in the Northern Territory

In the Northern Territory, Highway 1 is a 1,414-kilometre (879 mi) long route with a 316-kilometre (196 mi) long spur, that connects Darwin to northern Western Australia and Queensland. The route traverses the territory, from the Western Australian border near Kununurra, to Katherine, and then across to the Queensland border near Wollogorang, with a spur section linking Katherine to Darwin. Highway 1 continues around the rest of Australia, joining all mainland state capitals, and connecting major centres in Tasmania. All roads within the Highway 1 system are allocated a road route numbered 1, M1, A1, or B1, depending on the state route numbering system. In the Northern Territory, the highway is designated as National Highway 1 where it is concurrent with the National Highway routes linking Darwin to Adelaide and Perth. The eastern section from Daly Waters to Queensland is designated as National Route 1.

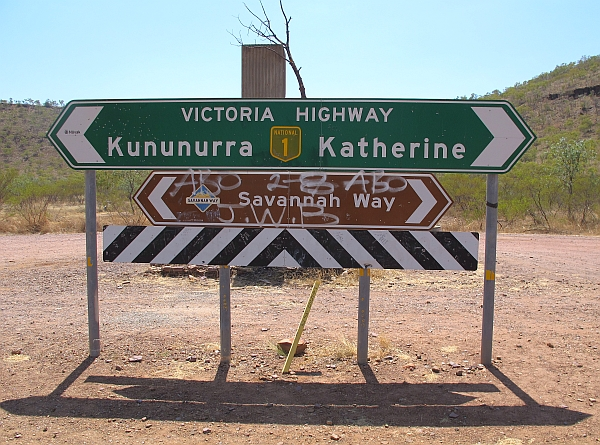
Road sign showing Victoria Highway as National Highway 1

== History ==
Highway 1 was created as part of the National Route Numbering system, adopted in 1955. The route was compiled from an existing network of state and local roads and tracks.

== Route description ==
=== Kununurra to Katherine ===
The Northern Territory section of Highway 1 begins at the Western Australian border, east of Kununurra. It follows Victoria Highway to Katherine.

=== Katherine to Darwin ===
A spur section travels north along Stuart Highway to Darwin.

=== Katherine to Wollogorang ===
Highway 1 continues south along Stuart Highway to Daly Waters. At Daly Waters, the Stuart Highway continues south towards Adelaide as National Highway 87, whilst Highway 1 turns east along Carpentaria Highway, as National Route 1, to the Queensland border east of Wollogorang

== Major intersections ==
Western Australia to Queensland

- Buchanan Highway (National Route 80)
- Buntine Highway (National Route 96)
- Central Arnhem Road (State Route 24)
- Roper Highway (State Route 20)
- Stuart Highway (National Highway 87)

Darwin spur

- Kakadu Highway (State Route 21)
- Dorat Road (State Route 23)
- Cox Peninsula Road (State Route 34)
- Arnhem Highway (State Route 36)
- Tiger Brennan Drive

== See also ==
- Highway 1 (New South Wales)
- Highway 1 (Queensland)
- Highway 1 (South Australia)
- Highway 1 (Tasmania)
- Highway 1 (Victoria)
- Highway 1 (Western Australia)
