= Victoria River, Northern Territory =

Victoria River Northern Territory
- Coordinates: 16°38′20″S 131°24′47″E
- Population: 152 (2016 census)
  - Density: 0.005572/km^{2} (0.01443/sq mi)
- Established: 4 April 2007
- Postcode(s): 0852
- Elevation: 89 m (292 ft)(weather station)
- Area: 27,278 km^{2} (10,532.1 sq mi)
- Time zone: ACST (UTC+9:30)
- Location: 450 km (280 mi) S of Darwin; 240 km (149 mi) S of Katherine
- LGA(s): Victoria Daly Region
- Territory electorate(s): Gwoja
- Federal division(s): Lingiari
Mean max temp	Mean min temp	Annual rainfall
34.6 °C; 94 °F	19.6 °C; 67 °F	647.7 mm 25.5 in
Suburbs around Victoria River:
Gregory	Gregory; Delamere; Sturt Plateau	Sturt Plateau
Gregory	Victoria River	Sturt Plateau; Birdum; Tanami East
Gurindji	Tanami East; Gurindji	Tanami East
- Footnotes: Locations; Adjoining localities (Note: The locality of Victoria River fully surrounds the locality of Yarralin and the community of Pigeon Hole and the town of Top Springs.)

Victoria River is a locality in the Northern Territory of Australia located about 450 kilometres (280 mi) south of the territory capital of Darwin and about 240 kilometres (150 mi) south of the municipal seat in Katherine.

The locality consists of the following land (from west to east) – the Humbert River pastoral lease, land described as NT Portion 1568, the Wambardi Aboriginal Land Trust, the Victoria River Downs pastoral lease, the Camfield pastoral lease, the Montejinni West pastoral lease, the Killarney pastoral lease, the Montejinni East pastoral lease, the Dungowan pastoral lease and the Birrimba pastoral lease. The locality fully surrounds the locality of Yarralin and the community of Pigeon Hole and the town of Top Springs. It has an area of 27,278 square kilometres (10,532 sq mi).

The locality’s boundaries and name were gazetted on 4 April 2007. Its name is derived from the river of the same name which flows through the locality from the south to the north and which was named in 1839 by Captains Wickham and Stokes of HMS Beagle after Queen Victoria, the Queen of the United Kingdom of Great Britain and Ireland.

The Buchanan Highway passes through the locality from the Stuart Highway in the east to the Victoria Highway in the north-west. The Buntine Highway passes through the locality from the south to the north and meets the Buchanan Highway at Top Springs.

Victoria River includes the following sites that have been listed on the Northern Territory Heritage Register: the Bullock Creek Fossil Site, Jasper Gorge and the Murranji Track including the following five sites associated with the track and which have been separately registered - Murranji Track, Jump-Up Cairn, Murranji Track, No. 12 Bore, Murranji Track, No. 13 Bore, Murranji Track, No. 14 (Pussycat) Bore Dipyard and Murranji Track, Surveyor Well's Cairn.

The 2016 Australian census which was conducted in August 2016 reports that Victoria River had 152 people living within its boundaries.

Victoria River is located within the federal division of Lingiari, the territory electoral division of Stuart and the local government area of the Victoria Daly Region.

== Climate ==
Climate data for Victoria River Downs, elevation 89 m (292 ft), (1991–2020 normals, extremes 1965–present)
Month	Jan	Feb	Mar	Apr	May	Jun	Jul	Aug	Sep	Oct	Nov	Dec	Year
Record high °C (°F)	44.4 (111.9)	43.9 (111.0)	43.2 (109.8)	40.9 (105.6)	38.3 (100.9)	36.9 (98.4)	37.7 (99.9)	39.2 (102.6)	41.4 (106.5)	44.9 (112.8)	45.4 (113.7)	44.9 (112.8)	45.4 (113.7)
Mean daily maximum °C (°F)	36.0 (96.8)	35.3 (95.5)	35.4 (95.7)	34.9 (94.8)	32.0 (89.6)	29.5 (85.1)	29.8 (85.6)	31.9 (89.4)	36.1 (97.0)	37.9 (100.2)	38.6 (101.5)	37.4 (99.3)	34.6 (94.2)
Mean daily minimum °C (°F)	24.8 (76.6)	24.5 (76.1)	23.2 (73.8)	19.9 (67.8)	15.3 (59.5)	11.8 (53.2)	11.0 (51.8)	12.4 (54.3)	18.4 (65.1)	22.3 (72.1)	24.6 (76.3)	25.3 (77.5)	19.5 (67.0)
Record low °C (°F)	15.9 (60.6)	17.0 (62.6)	12.7 (54.9)	9.3 (48.7)	4.0 (39.2)	2.2 (36.0)	1.3 (34.3)	2.7 (36.9)	5.5 (41.9)	10.5 (50.9)	14.2 (57.6)	15.1 (59.2)	1.3 (34.3)
Average rainfall mm (inches)	204.6 (8.06)	230.1 (9.06)	113 (4.4)	28.0 (1.10)	4.9 (0.19)	3.8 (0.15)	1.7 (0.07)	0.1 (0.00)	4.7 (0.19)	26.3 (1.04)	58.7 (2.31)	143.2 (5.64)	819.1 (32.21)
Average rainy days (≥ 1.0 mm)	12	12	8.0	2.0	0.7	0.3	0.2	0.1	0.6	2.9	5.9	10.6	55.3
Source: Australian Bureau of Meteorology
