= Olympic Dam =

Olympic Dam may refer to:

- The town of Olympic Dam in South Australia
- Olympic Dam Airport, South Australia
- Olympic Dam mine, a copper, uranium, gold and silver mining centre in South Australia
- The Olympic Dam Highway which runs from the Stuart Highway to the town of Olympic Dam
