= Highway 1 (Queensland) =

Part of a network of highways in Australia, in the state of Queensland

Highway 1 Queensland

- Map of Queensland with Highway 1 highlighted in red

General information
- Type: Highway
- Length: 2,964 km (1,842 mi)
- Opened: 1955
- Route number(s): National Route 1 (NT border to Cairns); A1 (Cairns to Kybong); M1 (Kybong to NSW border)

Major junctions
- Northwest end: QLD/NT border near Wollogorang
- Kennedy Developmental Road (State Route 62); Mulligan Highway (State Route 81); Captain Cook Highway (State Route 44); Gillies Highway (State Route 52); Palmerston Highway (State Route 25); Flinders Highway (A6); Peak Downs Highway (State Route 70); Capricorn Highway (A4); Burnett Highway (A3); Dawson Highway (State Route 60); Isis Highway (State Route 52); Wide Bay Highway (State Route 49); Gateway Motorway (M2)
- Southeast end: QLD/NSW border near Coolangatta

Highway system
- Highways in Australia; National Highway • Freeways in Australia; Highways in Queensland

In Queensland, Highway 1 is a 2,964-kilometre (1,842 mi) long route that crosses the state, from the Northern Territory (NT) border near Wollogorang to Cairns, and then travels along the coastline to the New South Wales (NSW) border near Coolangatta. Highway 1 continues around the rest of Australia, joining all mainland state capitals, and connecting major centres in Tasmania. All roads within the Highway 1 system are allocated a road route numbered 1, M1, A1, or B1, depending on the state route numbering system. In Queensland, the highway is designated as National Route 1 from the NT border to Cairns, Route A1 from Cairns to Kybong, and then Route M1 down to the NSW border.

== History ==
Highway 1 was created as part of the National Route Numbering system, adopted in 1955. The route was compiled from an existing network of state and local roads and tracks.

== Route description ==
The Savannah Way is the largely unsignposted route for Highway 1 between the Northern Territory border and Normanton. From there, it follows the Gulf Developmental Road, Kennedy Highway and Captain Cook Highway to Cairns. Highway 1 then travels southwards along the Queensland Coast along Bruce Highway to Brisbane. The highway travels through Brisbane as the Gateway Motorway, and continues south as the Pacific Motorway, towards the Gold Coast, and subsequently, the New South Wales border.

The following sections, which are freeways or dual carriageways, are designated as route M1:

- Bruce Highway from Kybong to Bald Hills.
- Gateway Motorway from Bald Hills to Eight Mile Plains.
- Pacific Motorway from Eight Mile Plains to the New South Wales Border, linking 'directly' with the Tugun Bypass.

== Development of the M1 ==
With the completion of Section C of the Bruce Highway - Cooroy to Curra upgrade project (Traveston to Woondum) in February 2018 the M1 has now been extended to Kybong, 10 kilometres (6.2 mi) south of Gympie. The Bruce Highway from Kybong to Gympie remains signed as A1. Section D of the project (Woondum to Curra, including a bypass of Gympie) will, when completed, become the next stage of the M1.

Note: While the references use Woondum as a designator for sections of the project the new intersection that marks the end of the M1 is wholly within the locality of Kybong, although bordered on two sides by Woondum.

== Major intersections ==
- Kennedy Developmental Road (State Route 62)
- Mulligan Highway (State Route 81)
- Captain Cook Highway (State Route 44)
- Gillies Highway (State Route 52)
- Palmerston Highway (State Route 25)
- Flinders Highway (A6)
- Peak Downs Highway (State Route 70)
- Capricorn Highway (A4)
- Burnett Highway (A3)
- Dawson Highway (State Route 60)
- Isis Highway (State Route 52)
- Wide Bay Highway (State Route 49)
- Gateway Motorway (M2)

== See also ==
- Highway 1 (New South Wales)
- Highway 1 (Northern Territory)
- Highway 1 (South Australia)
- Highway 1 (Tasmania)
- Highway 1 (Victoria)
- Highway 1 (Western Australia)
