= Duncan Road =

Road in Western Australia and Northern Territory

Duncan Road Formerly Duncan Highway Western Australia–Northern Territory
- Map on north-western Australia with Duncan Road highlighted in red

General information
- Type: Rural road
- Length: 443 km (275 mi)
- History: Constructed 1950–1956; Decommissioned 1976

Major junctions
- Southwest end: Great Northern Highway (National Highway 1), Halls Creek, Western Australia
- Buntine Highway (National Route 96)
- Northeast end: Victoria Highway (National Highway 1), Keep River National Park, Northern Territory (near WA border)

Location(s)
- Major settlements: Nicholson

Duncan Road is a generally northeast-southwest former highway in the northeast of Western Australia and northwest of Northern Territory that links the Victoria Highway with Halls Creek. The road, approximately 443 kilometres (275 mi) in length, was designated as National Route 80 from its terminus at Halls Creek through to Nicholson. National Route 80 continued east into the Northern Territory along Buntine Highway (now National Route 96), while Duncan Road snakes its way north, crossing the state border numerous times between Buntine Highway and Victoria Highway.

There are no facilities or fuel centres for the length of the 443 kilometre road.

== History ==
The road began as a 1949 proposal to help the beef industry that was developing in the Kimberley region of Western Australia. The State Government requested assistance from the Federal Government, which was provided as part of the States Grants (Encouragement of Meat Production) Act 1949 in October of that year. Construction of a 282-mile (454 km) road linking Wyndham to Nicholson started in 1950, and was completed in 1956.

Further work occurred after the federal government passed the Western Australian Grants (Beef Cattle Roads) Act 1961. It was part of a scheme to improve export revenue by allocating funds for the construction and upgrading of roads in the north of Australia. The scheme, which ran throughout the 1960s, enabled the upgrading of the route between Wyndham and Nicholson, and its extension to Halls Creek. In 1961, the road was named Duncan Highway after Ron Duncan, the Main Roads District Engineer for the North West from 1940 to 1953.

The highway was decommissioned in July 1976, and renamed Duncan Road. In 1995 the road was reclassified as a local road, transferring control and maintenance from Main Roads Western Australia to the Shire of Halls Creek.

== See also ==
- Highways in Australia
- List of highways in the Northern Territory
- List of highways in Western Australia
