= Highway 1 (South Australia) =

Route number in South Australia

Highway 1 South Australia
- Map of South Australia with Highway 1 highlighted in red

General information
- Type: Highway
- Length: 1,715 km (1,066 mi)
- Opened: 1955
- Route number(s): A1; (SA/VIC border to Mount Gambier); B1; (Mount Gambier to Tailem Bend); A1; (Tailem Bend to Murray Bridge); M1; (Murray Bridge to Glen Osmond); A1; (Glen Osmond to Dulwich); R1; (Dulwich to Medindie); A1; (Medindie to Eucla)

Major junctions
- SA/VIC border end: near Mount Gambier
- Riddoch Highway; Dukes Highway; Portrush Road; Salisbury Highway; Northern Expressway; Stuart Highway; Lincoln Highway; Tod Highway; Flinders Highway
- SA/WA border end: near Eucla

Location(s)
- Major settlements: Millicent, Kingston SE, Murray Bridge, Mount Barker, Adelaide, Port Wakefield, Port Augusta, Ceduna

Highway system
- Highways in Australia; National Highway • Freeways in Australia; Highways in South Australia

In South Australia, Highway 1 is a 1,715-kilometre (1,066 mi) long route that follows the coastline of the state, from the Victorian border near Mount Gambier to the Western Australian border near Eucla. Highway 1 continues around the rest of Australia, joining all mainland state capitals, and connecting major centres in Tasmania. All roads within the Highway 1 system are allocated a road route numbered M1, A1, B1 or R1, depending on the state route numbering system. In South Australia, most of the highway is designated as route A1, with multi-lane, dual-carriage-way sections generally designated route M1, and the alignment around the Adelaide CBD designated route R1. South-east of Tailem Bend, it is designated route B1.

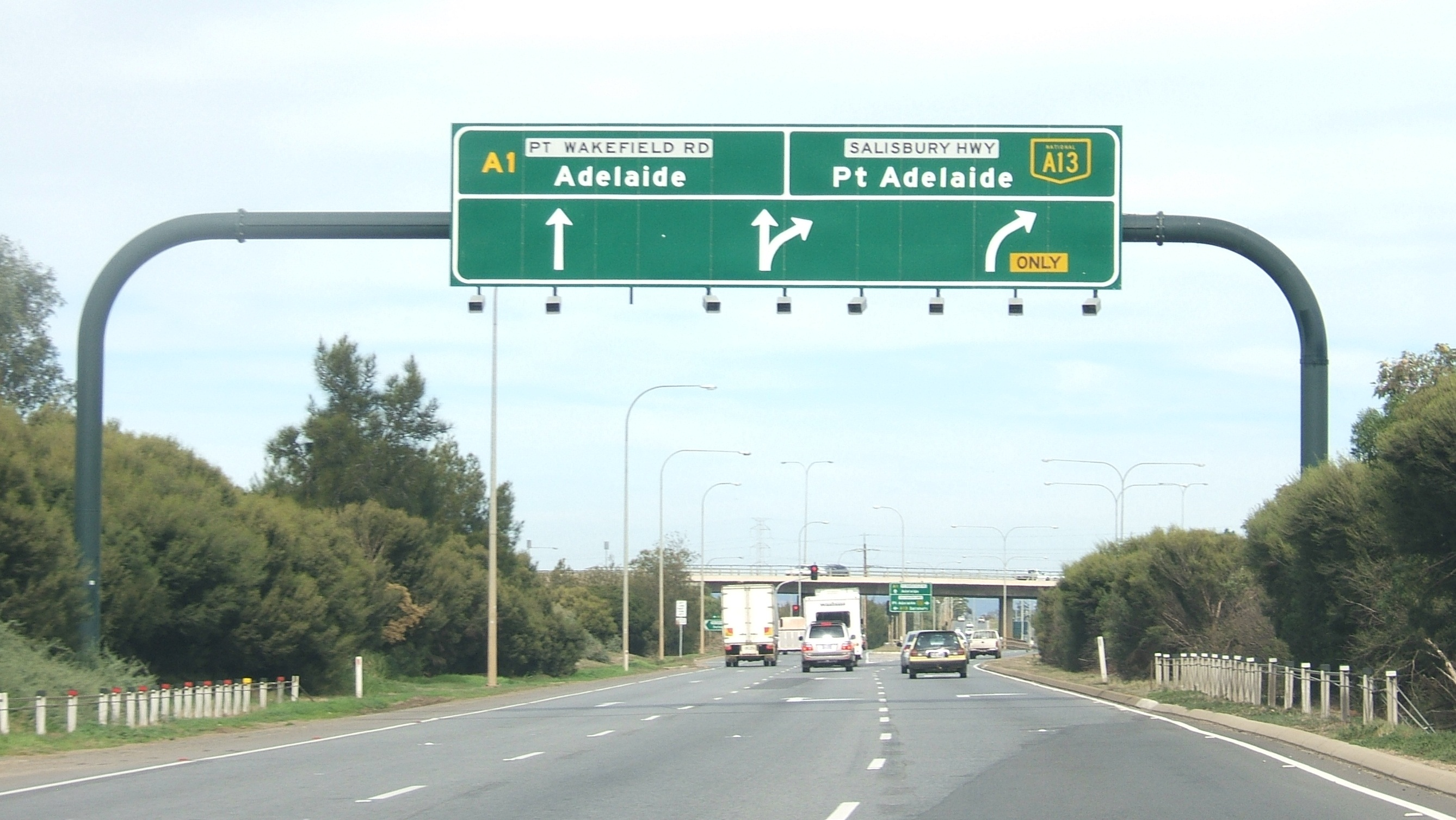
Overhead sign showing Port Wakefield Road as A1, in Mawson Lakes

== History ==
Highway 1 was created as part of the National Route Numbering system, adopted in 1955. The route was compiled from an existing network of state and local roads and tracks. It was meant to be a National Route between the Victorian Border near Mt. Gambier and Adelaide. In 1958, it was extended northward from Adelaide to Port Augusta, and westward, toward the Eyre/Lincoln highway junction. The Eyre Highway, the Port Wakefield-Port Augusta Road, Port Wakefield Road, and the South Eastern Freeway were declared National Highways in November 1974. Since, the route has remained static.

== Route description ==
In South Australia, the highway connects:

- from the SA/VIC border
  - via Princes Highway to
- Mount Gambier
  - via Princes Highway to
- Tailem Bend
  - via Princes Highway to
- Murray Bridge
  - via South Eastern Freeway to
- Glen Osmond
  - via Glen Osmond and Fullarton Roads to
- Dulwich, on the eastern edge of the Adelaide city centre
  - via City Ring Route to
- Medindie, on the northern edge of North Adelaide
  - via Main North Road to
- Gepps Cross
  - via Port Wakefield Road and Port Wakefield Highway to
- Port Wakefield
  - via Augusta Highway to
- Port Augusta
  - via Eyre Highway to
- Eucla

== Major intersections ==
- Riddoch Highway (A66/B66)
- Dukes Highway (A8)
- Portrush Road (A17)
- Salisbury Highway (A9)
- Northern Expressway (M2)
- Stuart Highway (A87)
- Lincoln Highway (B100)
- Tod Highway (B90)
- Flinders Highway (B100)

== See also ==
- Highway 1 (New South Wales)
- Highway 1 (Northern Territory)
- Highway 1 (Queensland)
- Highway 1 (Tasmania)
- Highway 1 (Victoria)
- Highway 1 (Western Australia)
