= Highway 1 (Western Australia) =

Road section from Eucla to Kununurra

Highway 1 Western Australia

- Map of Western Australia with Highway 1 highlighted in red

General information
- Type: Highway
- Length: 5,305 km (3,296 mi)
- Opened: 1955
- Route number(s): National Highway 1 (east of Norseman and Port Hedland); National Route 1 (Norseman to Port Hedland)

Major junctions
- Southeast end: WA/SA border near Eucla
- Coolgardie-Esperance Highway (National Highway 94); Newdegate-Ravensthorpe Road (State Route 40); Albany Highway (State Route 30); South Western Highway (State Route 20); Forrest Highway (State Route 2); Great Northern Highway (National Highway 95); Indian Ocean Drive (State Route 60); Midlands Road (State Route 116); Geraldton-Mount Magnet Road (State Route 123); Marble Bar Road (State Route 138)
- Northeast end: WA/NT border near Kununurra

Location(s)
- Major settlements: Norseman, Esperance, Albany, Bunbury, Perth, Geraldton, Carnarvon, Port Hedland, Broome

Highway system
- Highways in Australia; National Highway • Freeways in Australia; Highways in Western Australia

In Western Australia, Highway 1 is a 5,305-kilometre (3,296 mi) long route around the state, from the South Australian border near Eucla to the Northern Territory border near Kununurra. Highway 1 continues around the rest of Australia, joining all mainland state capitals, and connecting major centres in Tasmania. All roads within the Highway 1 system are allocated a road route numbered 1, M1, A1, or B1, depending on the state route numbering system. In Western Australia, most of the highway is designated as National Route 1; however, the sections in the north-east and south-east of the state that are concurrent with the National Highway routes linking Perth to Adelaide and Darwin are designated as National Highway 1.

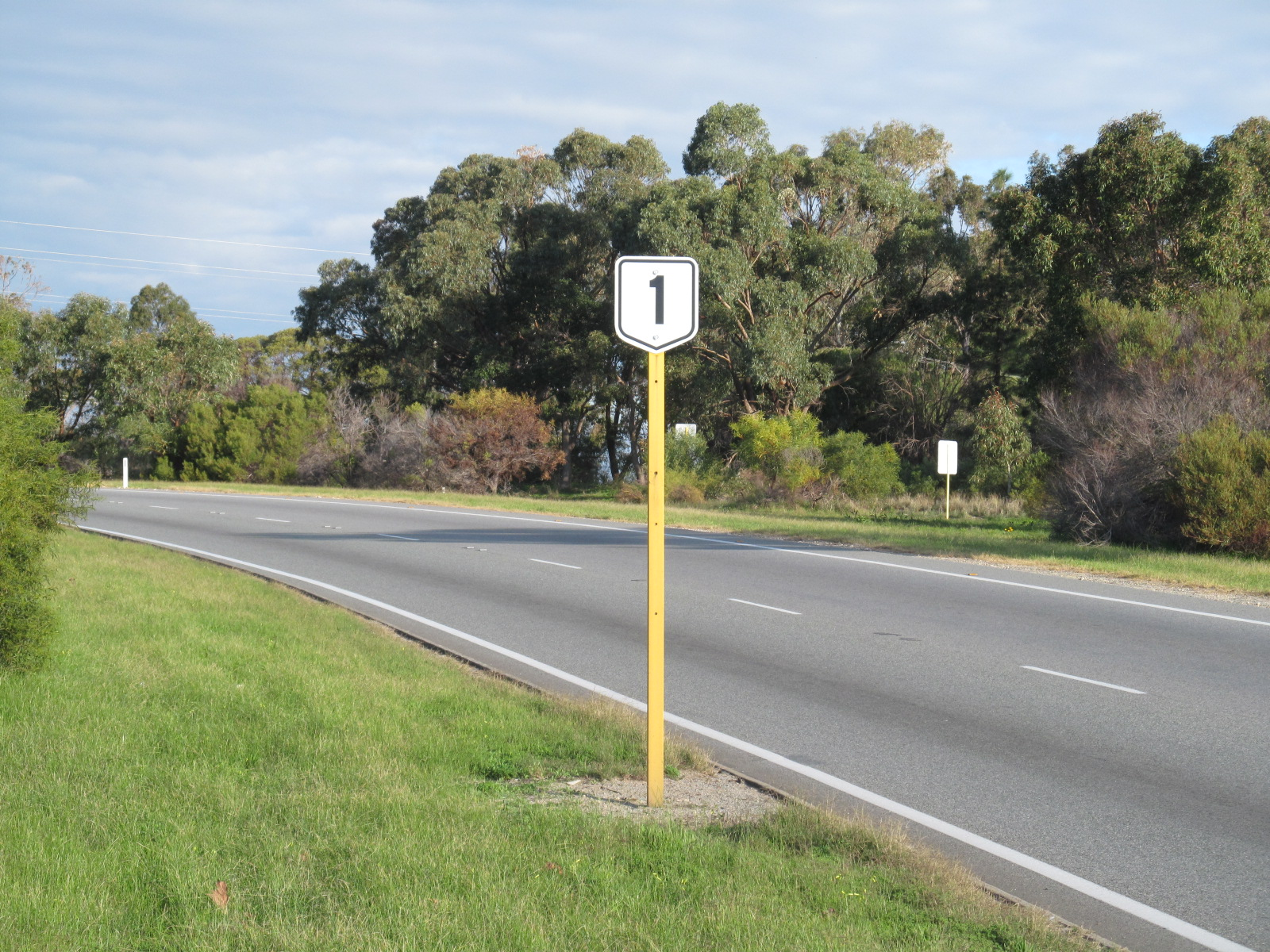
Route 1 sign on Stock Road, Coolbellup

== Route description ==
=== Eucla to Perth ===
The Western Australian section of Highway 1 starts at the South Australian border, east of Eucla. It follows the Eyre Highway west to Norseman, designated National Highway 1. At Norseman, Highway 1 continues south along Coolgardie-Esperance Highway as National Route 1, while the National Highway follows Coolgardie–Esperance Highway north, as National Highway 94. After reaching Esperance, Highway 1 follows South Coast Highway to Ravensthorpe and Albany, and then follows the coast to Walpole. The highway departs Walpole as South Western Highway, travelling north-west to Bunbury via Manjimup, Bridgetown, and Donnybrook. The highway follows Robertson Drive, Bunbury's ring road, and then heads north via Forrest Highway. At Lake Clifton, Old Coast Road takes Highway 1 north along the coastline to Halls Head, south of Mandurah. From Halls Head, the highway bypasses Mandurah via Mandurah Road, and continues north along that road to Karnup, at the edge of the Perth Metropolitan Region.

=== Perth ===
Highway 1 continues north from Karnup as Ennis Avenue to Rockingham, and then to Palmyra, east of Fremantle, as Patterson Road, Rockingham Road, and Stock Road. The highway travels east along Leach Highway, concurrent with State Route 7, to Kwinana Freeway in Brentwood, and north along the freeway, which is also State Route 2, to the next interchange with Canning Highway in Como. Canning Highway, State Route 6, takes Highway 1 northeast to Victoria Park, where it continues northeast as Great Eastern Highway, concurrent with National Highway 94. National Highway 94 departs Great Eastern Highway at South Guildford, continuing along Great Eastern Highway Bypass, whereas Highway 1 continues along Great Eastern Highway to Guildford. In Guildford, the highway becomes Johnson Street, and subsequently follows James Street and East Street, both of which are also part of State Route 51. Beyond Guildford, Great Eastern Highway resumes as National Highway 1 and State Route 51, though Highway 1 soon turns off through Midland as Morrison Road until it reaches Great Northern Highway. Highway 1 departs Perth by following Great Northern Highway to Muchea, and is concurrent with National Highway 95 north of Middle Swan.

=== Perth to Kununurra ===
From Muchea, Highway 1 travels northwest along the full length of Brand Highway to Geraldton, and then along North West Coastal Highway towards Port Hedland. Highway 1 encounters Great Northern Highway again, 25 kilometres (16 mi) south-west of South Hedland, and continues north-east along that highway. From this point, the designation switches from National Route 1 to National Highway 1. Highway 1 follows Great Northern Highway north-east to Broome, east to Halls Creek, and then north to Lake Argyle. The highway then turns east along Victoria Highway to Kununurra and the Northern Territory border.

== History ==
Highway 1 was created as part of the National Route Numbering system, adopted in 1955. The route was compiled from an existing network of state and local roads and tracks.

=== South Australia to Norseman ===
Due to the onset on World War II, supply roads leading to the north of the Australia were considered vital. Construction on the Eyre Highway first started in July 1941 and was completed six months later. The highway, crossing the Nullarbor, formed just by grading the surface material. A decade long program to seal the highway began in the mid-1960s. The section from Norseman to the state border was completed in 1969.

=== Norseman to Esperance ===
Coolgardie–Esperance Highway was an unsealed road until 1960, when a 3.7 metre wide (single-lane) seal was completed between Coolgardie and Esperance. In 1974 the road was upgraded further and a two lane seal completed was between Coolgardie and Norseman. In 1980 a two lane seal was completed south of Norseman, which also completed the two lane seal from Coolgardie to Esperance.

=== Albany to Bunbury ===
A road from Bunbury to Boyanup, called the Blackwood Road, existed as early as 1864. A bi-weekly mail route from Boyanup to Bridgetown via Preston, Balingup, and Greenbushes was established by 1891; it also extended further south to Balbarrup on a weekly basis. Surveying of a direct Bridgetown–Albany route was requested in January 1871, so that an electric telegraph line could be established, but the government surveyors were overwhelmed by other work. Surveying of the route from Manjimup (south of Bridgetown, adjacent to Balbarrup) was undertaken in 1909 by Fred S. Brockman.

Following World War I, the government intended to settle returning servicemen in the far south-west of the state. To determine the public works required, a flying survey was undertaken. The route between Manjimup and Walpole (then known as Nornalup) was reported to be overgrown and impassable. The Public Works Department was tasked with clearing the route and forming a road, with works gradually progressing from c. 1919 onwards. By October 1921, £16,000 had been spent on upgrading the dirt track to a formed and gravelled road, with works expected to be completed over the 1921–22 summer at a cost of £2,000.

The road from Bunbury through Bridgetown to Manjimup was improved in 1926, as one of the Main Road Board's first projects. The worst segments were identified for reconstruction, as part of an ongoing process to create a high-quality highway.

=== Bunbury to Perth ===
The settlement of Australind by the Western Australian Land Company in 1840–41 prompted the first real need for a good quality road to Perth. A coastal Australind–Mandurah route was completed by 2 November 1842. Though the road was rebuilt by convicts in the 1850s, its importance was already declining. With a new road via Pinjarra at the foothills of the Darling Scarp completed in 1876, and the opening of the Perth−Bunbury railway in 1893, few people travelled up the old coastal road. In the late 1930s there was a proposal to re-establish the road as a tourist route, which could also reduce traffic on the main road along the foothills, but it was put on hold due to World War II. Improvements to Old Coast Road started in the early 1950s, but with little progress made until 1954 when the Main Roads Department approved £1000 worth of works. The name "Old Coast Road" was formally adopted on 27 January 1959, and a sealed road was completed in September 1969.

=== Perth to Geraldton ===
Brand Highway began as part of a network of roads between Dongara and Gingin, as a result of increased development in the area. Early surveying of the road, in the 1950s, was undertaken from within a light aircraft flying over the area. This was one of the first times in Western Australia that this technique was used. Wide road reserves, up to 200 metres (220 yd) in width, were acquired from crown land and pastoral leases. This allowed native wildflowers to survive and flourish on public land, providing aesthetically pleasing and interesting views to reduce road hypnosis and driver fatigue. The road would also be made safer by removing natural roadside obstacles, and replacing them with shrubs and more wildflowers.

Construction on roads that would eventually be part of the Brand Highway began in 1959. Various segments were completed as the need arose, until in 1975, there was a new link between Perth and Geraldton. The route reduced the distance between the cities by 78 kilometres (48 mi), and had a total cost of $4.2 million. It was officially opened on 4 April 1975 by the Minister for Transport, Ray O'Connor at Eneabba. One year later, the road was named Brand Highway after Sir David Brand, who was Premier of Western Australia from 1959 to 1971 and also held the local electorate of Greenough from 1945 to 1975.

=== Geraldton to Port Hedland ===
North West Coastal Highway was created in 1944 from existing roads and tracks through remote pastoral areas. However, it was a hazardous route that could be dusty in the dry season, and boggy or washed away in the wet season. Economic growth and development in northern Western Australia prompted initial improvement efforts in the late 1940s, and a sealed road was constructed from Geraldton to Carnarvon by 1962. The impact of cyclones and seasonal flooding resulted in a realignment inland of the Carnarvon to Port Hedland section, which was constructed and sealed between 1966 and 1973, and required thirty new bridges. Various upgrades have been carried out in sections across the length of the highway, including the Geraldton Southern Transport Corridor project which grade-separated the highway's junction with Brand Highway.

=== Port Hedland to Lake Argyle ===
Great Northern Highway was created in 1944 from existing roads in the Wheatbelt, and a series of tracks through remote pastoral areas. Like North West Coastal Highway, it was a hazardous route that could be dusty in the dry season, and boggy or washed away in the wet season. Some sections were effectively just sand, while others contained limestone outcrops. Economic growth and development in northern Western Australia prompted initial improvement efforts, and the federal government's Beef Roads Scheme in the 1960s resulted in a noticeably higher quality road in the Kimberley. Construction of a sealed road from Perth to Wyndham, including numerous bridges to reduce the impact of seasonal flooding, took many years to complete. The last section opened on 16 December 1989, and received national media coverage. However, by then many older sections were either worn out or not up to modern standards. Various upgrades have been carried out in small sections, across the length of the highway, with further works planned.

=== Lake Argyle to the Northern Territory ===
Originally a series of unformed tracks linking pastoral holdings, the route was developed as a gravel road in the 1950s to aid the beef industry. Improvements took place in the 1960s which tied in with the development of the Ord Irrigation Scheme, which enabled the introduction of road trains. It was designated as National Highway in 1974 and was fully reconstructed and sealed to a good standard by the early 1990s.

== Major intersections ==
- Coolgardie–Esperance Highway (National Highway 94)
- Newdegate–Ravensthorpe Road (State Route 40)
- Albany Highway (State Route 30)
- South Western Highway (State Route 20)
- Forrest Highway (State Route 2)
- Great Northern Highway (National Highway 95)
- Indian Ocean Drive (State Route 60)
- Midlands Road (State Route 116)
- Geraldton–Mount Magnet Road (State Route 123)
- Marble Bar Road (State Route 138)

== See also ==
- Highway 1 (New South Wales)
- Highway 1 (Northern Territory)
- Highway 1 (Queensland)
- Highway 1 (South Australia)
- Highway 1 (Tasmania)
- Highway 1 (Victoria)
