= Carpentaria Highway =

Highway in the Northern Territory

Carpentaria Highway Northern Territory
- Carpentaria Highway (green and black)

General information
- Type: Highway
- Length: 380 km (236 mi)
- Route number(s): National Route 1; B1 (future route number)

Major junctions
- West end: Stuart Highway (National Highways 1 / 87), Daly Waters
- Tablelands Highway (State Route 11)
- East end: Savannah Way (National Route 1), Borroloola

Highway system
- Highways in Australia; National Highway • Freeways in Australia; Highways in the Northern Territory

The Carpentaria Highway is a 380-kilometre-long (240 mi) highway, which runs from near Daly Waters to Borroloola in the Northern Territory, Australia. It is a sealed road and is part of National Highway 1. The Highway takes its name from the Gulf of Carpentaria, which it links with the Stuart Highway. The Carpentaria Highway also provides road access to the McArthur River mineral deposits and port facilities at Bing Bong, as well as the isolated community of Borroloola and the popular fishing location at King Ash Bay. Funding for maintenance is provided by the Northern Territory government.

== See also ==
- Highways in Australia
- List of highways in the Northern Territory
