= Savannah Way =

Route in Australia

Coordinates: 14°28′0″S 132°16′0″E

Savannah Way Queensland–Western Australia
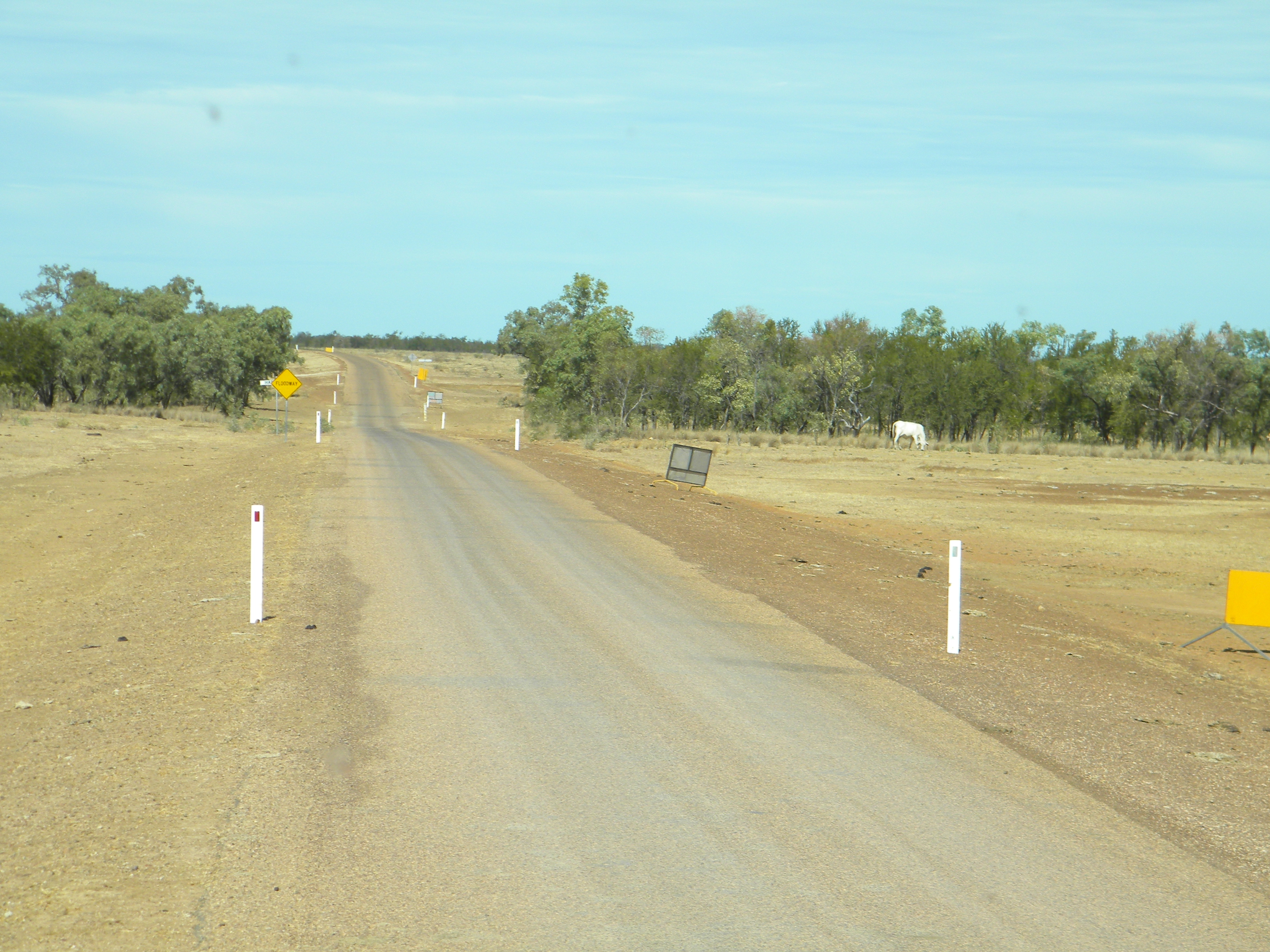
- Savannah Way, Queensland

General information
- Type: Highway
- Length: 3,501 km (2,175 mi)
- Route number(s): National Highway 1 (Broome to NT Border); A1 (WA Border to Mataranka); B20 (Roper Highway); Nathan River Road; C1 (Wollogorang Road at Nathan River Road Junction to QLD Border); National Route 1 (NT Border to Cairns)

Major junctions
- East end: Cairns, Queensland
- West end: Broome, Western Australia

Location(s)
- Major settlements: Katherine, Borroloola, Burketown, Normanton, Croydon, Georgetown

Highway system
- Highways in Australia; National Highway • Freeways in Australia; Highways in Queensland; Highways in Western Australia

The Savannah Way is a route of highways and major roads across the tropical savannahs of northern Australia, linking Cairns in Queensland with Broome in Western Australia. Promoted as a self-drive tourist route, it joins Cairns, Normanton, Borroloola, Katherine, Kununurra, Fitzroy Crossing, Derby and Broome. It has been designated by the Queensland Government as a State Strategic Touring Route.

Much of the route is Highway 1; however, much of it is on unsealed roads. It runs for a distance of 3,501 kilometres (2,175 mi). Parts of Savannah Way form part of the National Highway network.

Alternate routes are signposted along the way allowing travellers different options from the main Savannah Way. From Cairns they include travel via Chillagoe and the Burke Developmental Road to Karumba; via Einasleigh and Forsayth to Georgetown; via Gregory Downs to Boodjamulla National Park (Lawn Hill) and Bowthorn station; via Daly Waters and Top Springs to Timber Creek; or via the Gibb River Road to Derby.

== See also ==
- Highways in Australia
- List of highways in Queensland
- List of highways in the Northern Territory
- List of highways in Western Australia
- Highway 1

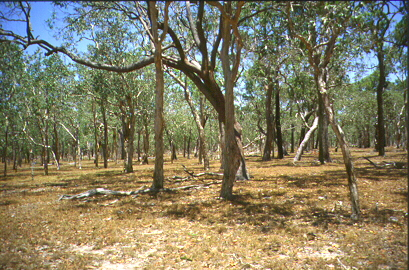
Australian savannah
