= Central Arnhem Road =

Central Arnhem Road Northern Territory
- Central Arnhem Road NT

General information
- Type: Road
- Length: 663 km (412 mi)
- Route number(s): C24

Major junctions
- Southwest end: Stuart Highway (National Highway 1), 51 km (32 mi) S Katherine
- Northeast end: Melville Bay Road, Gove Airport, 12 km (7.5 mi) S Nhulunbuy

Location(s)
- Major suburbs: Barunga, Beswick, Bulman

The Central Arnhem Road, also referred to as the Central Arnhem Highway or locally as "The Track", is a designated state route in the Northern Territory of Australia linking the Stuart Highway to the town of Nhulunbuy on the Gove Peninsula and communities across the East Arnhem region. It connects over 12,000 residents and is a key tourism drive and freight route for the mining and pastoral industries.

The route traverses through Aboriginal Land and passes through the Aboriginal communities of Barunga, Wulugarr (Beswick) and Bulman. A free permit from the Northern Land Council is required for non-indigenous persons to travel its length.

Australian 4WD Action ranked the drive 5th in its list of 20 "must drive" four-wheel drive tracks in Australia in 2010.

== Driving conditions ==
The vast majority of the road is unsealed and is prone to seasonal (December to April) flooding, resulting in frequent road restrictions for heavy vehicles and infrequent closures. Due to road conditions, four-wheel drive vehicles are recommended and caravans and camping trailers should be heavy duty. The condition of the road is highly variable, with conditions dependent on the time of year and the road maintenance schedule. Mud, river crossings, loose gravel, corrugations and bulldust are some of the road conditions subject to change of weather conditions.

=== Fuel ===
Fuel is available at three locations along the route: the community of Wulugarr, 60 km (37 mi) from the junction with the Stuart Highway; the Mainoru Store, 197 km (122 mi) from the junction with the Stuart Highway; and the community of Bulman, 256 km (159 mi) from the junction with the Stuart Highway. Carrying extra fuel is recommended.

=== Telecommunications ===
Telstra service is available when passing through the Aboriginal communities of Barunga, Beswick and Bulman and at locations marked with blue signposts along the route.

== Upgrades ==
=== River crossing upgrades ===
In 2014, a regional roads funding package was announced by the Australian Government which included $7.7 million for upgrades to the Donydji, Goyder and Mainoru River crossings, as well as allocation from the $90 million Northern Territory Roads Productivity Package for the construction of a bridge over Rocky Bottom Creek.

=== Central Arnhem Road Corridor upgrades ===
Under the National Partnership Agreement on Land Transport (NPALT), the Australian Government committed $180 million and the Northern Territory Government committed $50 million to contribute to sealing, reconstructing, widening, and flood immunity improvements to priority sections of the route to a fit-for-purpose standard. These works expected to see 25–35% of the road sealed to a dual lane standard occurring over a five- to ten-year period from 2019.

The Federal Budget 2022–2023 released on 25 October 2022 committed $350 million of additional funding to continue the work of sealing the Tanami Road and Central Arnhem Road.

=== Future upgrades ===
Nhulunbuy remains the only large regional centre in the Northern Territory not connected to the National Highway network via a sealed road. The Northern Territory Government plans to seal the entire length of the Central Arnhem Road to a dual-lane standard which is expected to unlock the economic potential of the region and open up a range of new long-term economic and social opportunities. This will be achieved through reduced transit times, improved reliability of supply chains, safer road conditions, and overall improved accessibility in the region. It is also expected to enhance liveability and improve social outcomes by improving access to health and educational services, facilitating social and cultural connections and reducing barriers to development, including operating costs for business.

== Major intersections ==
LGA	Distance	Destinations	Notes
Katherine	0 km (0 mi)	Stuart Highway (National Highway 1) North – Katherine South – Mataranka	
Roper Gulf	180 km (110 mi)	Mainoru Cattle Station	
Roper Gulf	353 km (219 mi)	Ramingining via Ramingining Access Road	
East Arnhem	482 km (300 mi)	Gapuwiyak via Gapuwiyak Access Road	
unincorporated (mining lease)	646 km (401 mi)	North – Nhulunbuy/Yirrkala/Gunyangara South – Gulkula/Bawaka	Road transitions from Central Arnhem Road to Dhupuma Road

== See also ==
- Highways in Australia
- List of highways in the Northern Territory
