= Stuart Highway =

Highway in the Northern Territory and South Australia

Stuart Highway Northern Territory–South Australia
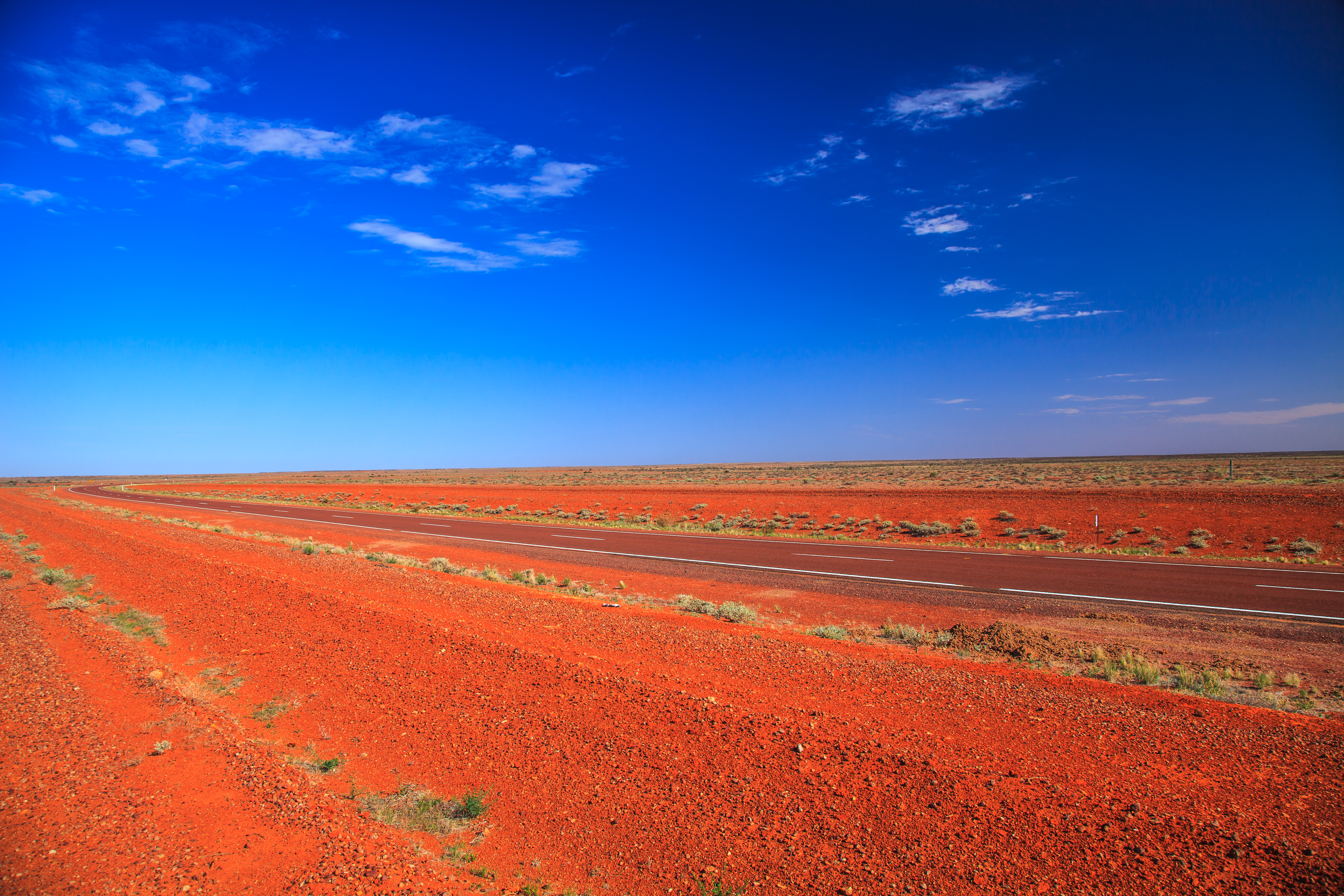
- The highway in the far north of South Australia
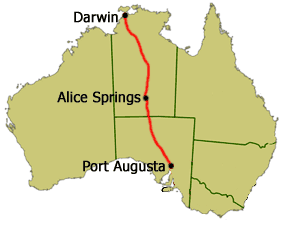
- Map of mainland Australia with Stuart Highway highlighted in red
- Coordinates: 12.4546°S 130.8392°E (North end); 32.4802°S 137.7529°E (South end)

General information
- Type: Highway
- Length: 2,720 km (1,690 mi)
- Route number(s): A1 (2017–present) (Darwin–Daly Waters); A87 (2017–present) (Daly Waters–Port Augusta)
- Former route number: National Highway 1 (1974–2017); National Route 1 (1955–1974) (Darwin–Daly Waters); National Highway A87 (1998–2017) (NT/SA border–Port Augusta); National Highway 87 (1974–1998/2017) (Daly Waters–Port Augusta); National Route 87 (1955–1974) (Daly Waters–Port Augusta)

Major junctions
- North end: Daly Street; Darwin
- Victoria Highway; Carpentaria Highway; Buchanan Highway; Barkly Highway; Larapinta Drive; Lasseter Highway; Olympic Dam Highway
- South end: Eyre Highway; Augusta Highway; Port Augusta, South Australia

Location(s)
- Region: Far North
- Major settlements: Katherine, Daly Waters, Tennant Creek, Alice Springs, Coober Pedy

Highway system
- Highways in Australia; National Highway • Freeways in Australia; Highways in the Northern Territory; Highways in South Australia

Stuart Highway is a major Australian highway. It runs from Darwin, in the Northern Territory, via Tennant Creek and Alice Springs, to Port Augusta in South Australia; it has a distance of 2,720 km (1,690 mi). Its northern and southern extremities are segments of Australia's Highway 1. The principal north–south route through the central interior of mainland Australia, the highway is often referred to simply as "The Track".

The highway is named after Scottish explorer John McDouall Stuart, who was the first European to cross Australia from south to north. The highway approximates the route Stuart took.

== Route description ==
=== Overview ===
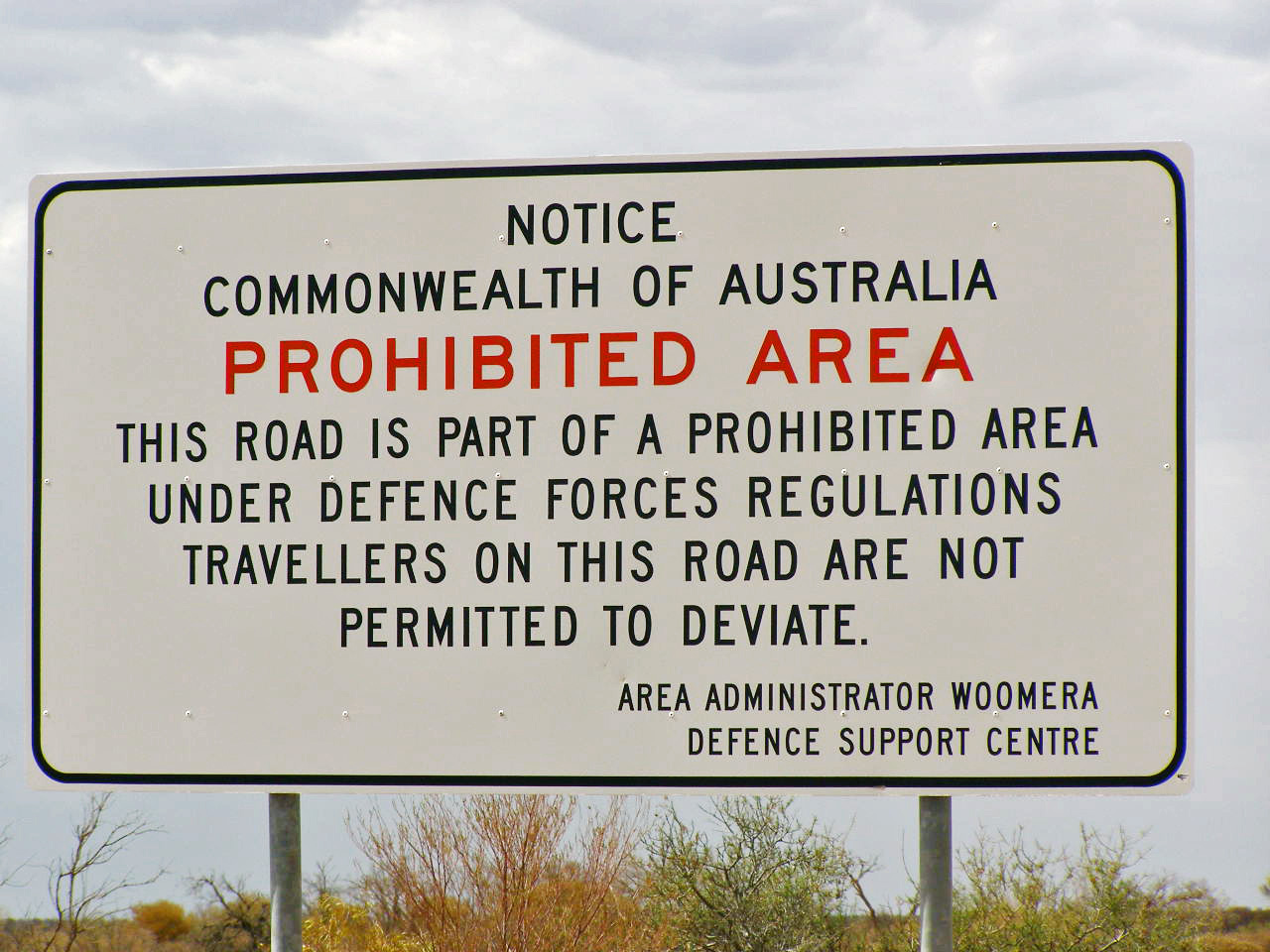
The highway passes through the Woomera Prohibited Area

Stuart Highway runs from Darwin, Northern Territory, in the north, via Tennant Creek and Alice Springs, to Port Augusta, South Australia, in the south – a distance of 2,720 km (1,690 mi).

The Royal Flying Doctor Service uses the highway as an emergency landing strip and sections of the highway are signed to that effect. These sections of highway have been specially selected and prepared for the landing of aircraft which only takes place after the piece of road has been closed by the police.

There are petrol and other facilities (meals, toilets, etc.) available at reasonable intervals (usually around 200 km (120 mi)) and more frequent rest stops. Some of the rest stops are located at scenic points with information boards, but others are little more than a picnic table and a rubbish bin in an otherwise deserted area.

=== Northern Territory ===
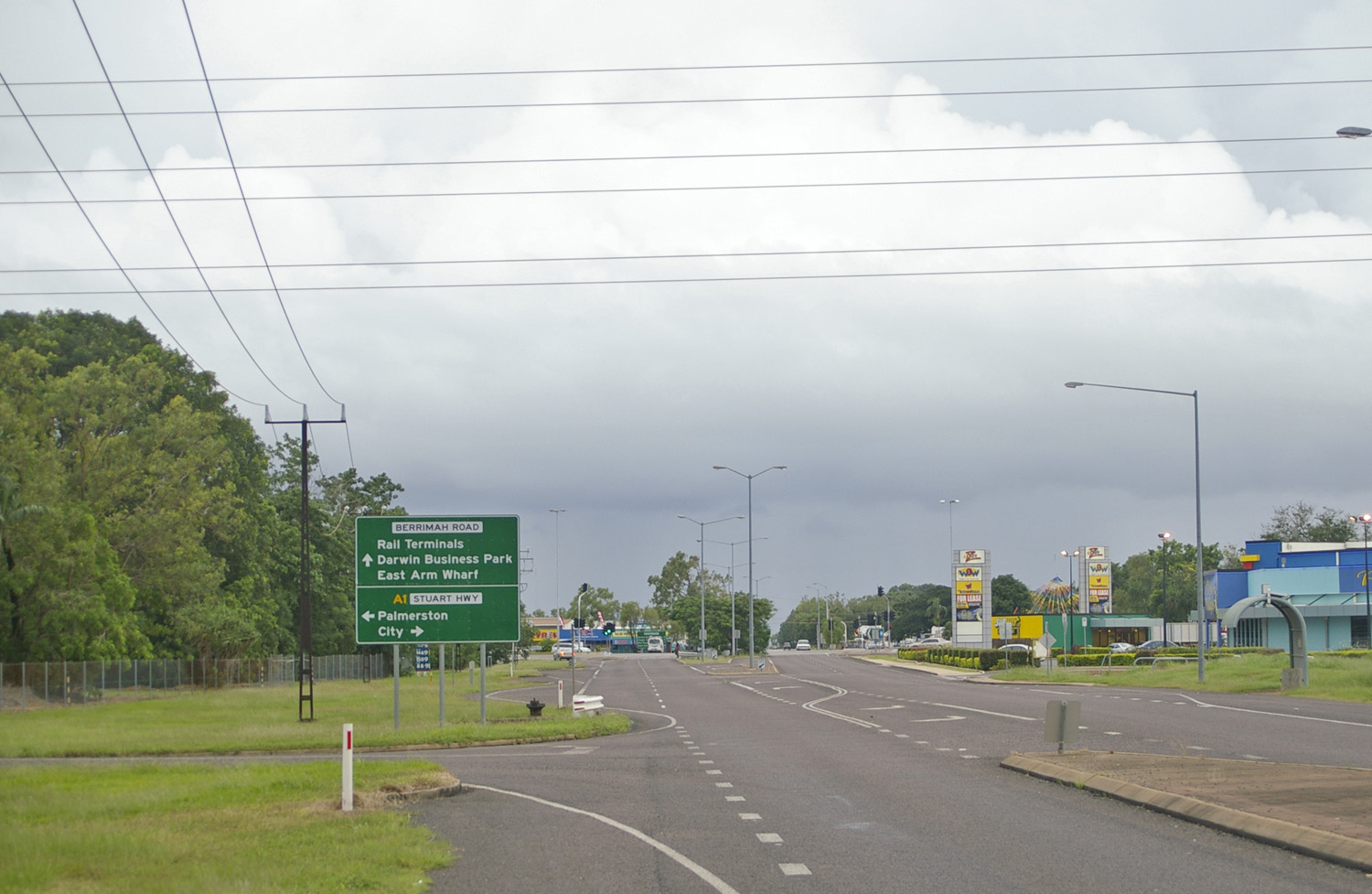
Stuart Highway intersection in Berrimah

The Northern Territory section of Stuart Highway starts from the edge of the Darwin central business district at Daly Street and continues as a dual-carriageway to Arnhem Highway in Howard Springs. From there the highway runs 317 km (197 mi) south, passing Kakadu Highway and reaching Victoria Highway at Katherine.

At Daly Waters, the route number changes from A1 to A87. The highway then continues 673 km (418 mi) south, passing Roper Highway, Carpentaria Highway and Buchanan Highway before reaching Barkly Highway at Tennant Creek. From there it runs a further 508 km (316 mi) south into Alice Springs, passing Plenty Highway. It passes through the MacDonnell Ranges and finally crosses the Northern Territory/South Australia border south of Kulgera.

The highway was only fully sealed in February 1987 as part of the Australian Bicentenary roadworks programme. There are no police patrolling the majority of this remote highway and until the end of 2006 there was no speed limit outside towns and other built-up areas on the Northern Territory part. The unrestricted limit has now been generally set at 130 kilometres per hour (80 mph). The bulk of the Northern Territory's population not living in Darwin lies along its track.

=== South Australia ===
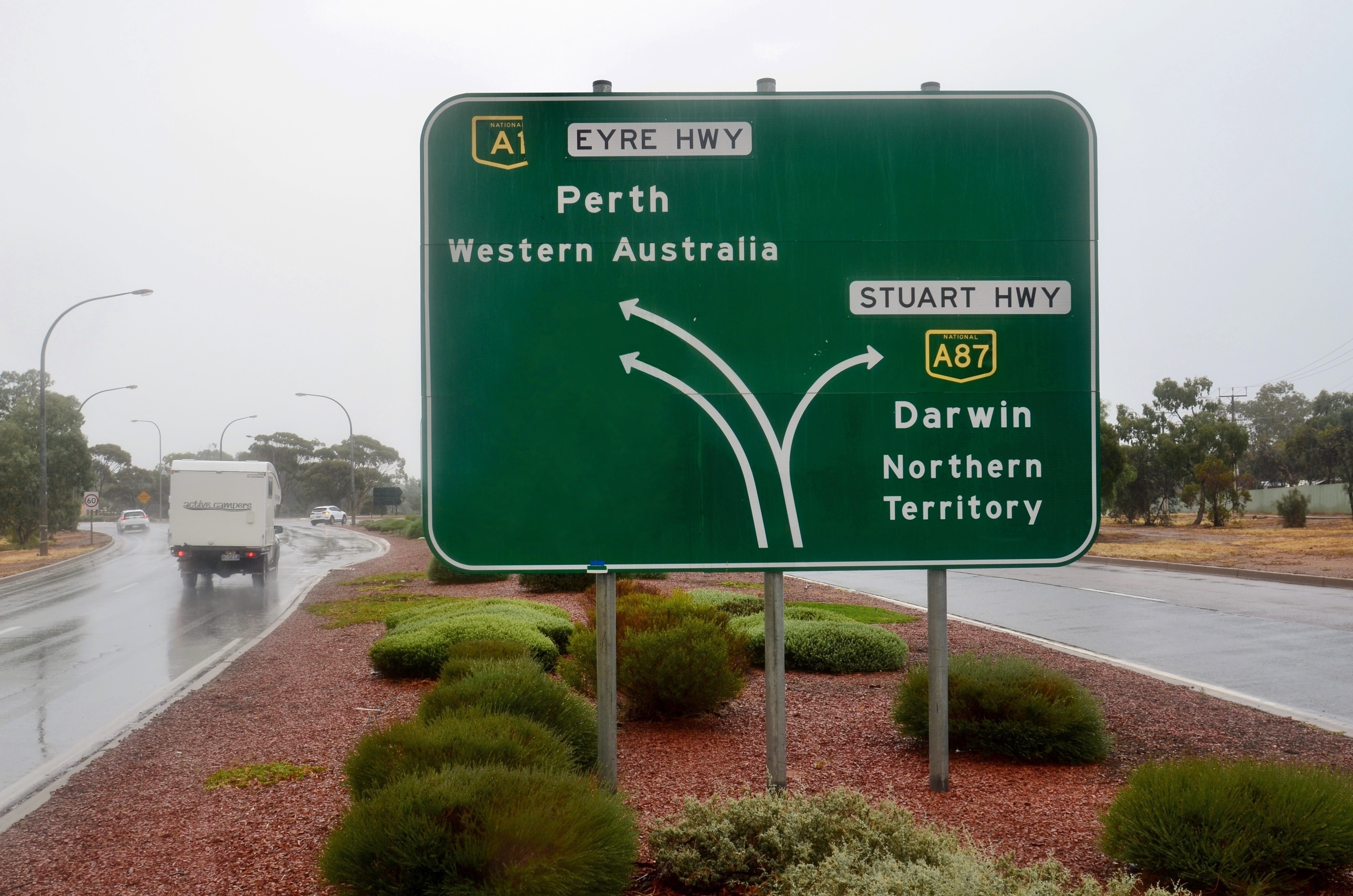
Sign near the southern end of the highway at Port Augusta West

Stuart Highway passes through the Far North region to Port Augusta. The highway passes through the Woomera Prohibited Area where travellers may not leave the road. The highway continues south-east towards Adelaide.

== History ==
=== Background ===
John McDouall Stuart led the first successful expedition to traverse the Australian mainland from south to north and return, through the centre of the continent, in 1861–1862. In 1871–1872 the Australian Overland Telegraph Line was constructed along Stuart's route. The principal road from Port Augusta to Darwin was also established on a similar route.

A track developed along the route of the telegraph, and by 1888 the road between Adelaide and Alice Springs was well known. Several wells along the route provided water, although these could run dry or be contaminated by dead animals, resulting in sections as long as 144 miles (232 km) without water.

The route was traversed by motor vehicles in the 1920s. While passable, sections of the road could be sandy, boggy, washed away in the winter, or rugged with boulders. Several creek crossings were required, though few were difficult. North of Alice Springs the road was in comparatively good condition, with sections allowing speeds of up to 50 miles per hour (80 km/h).

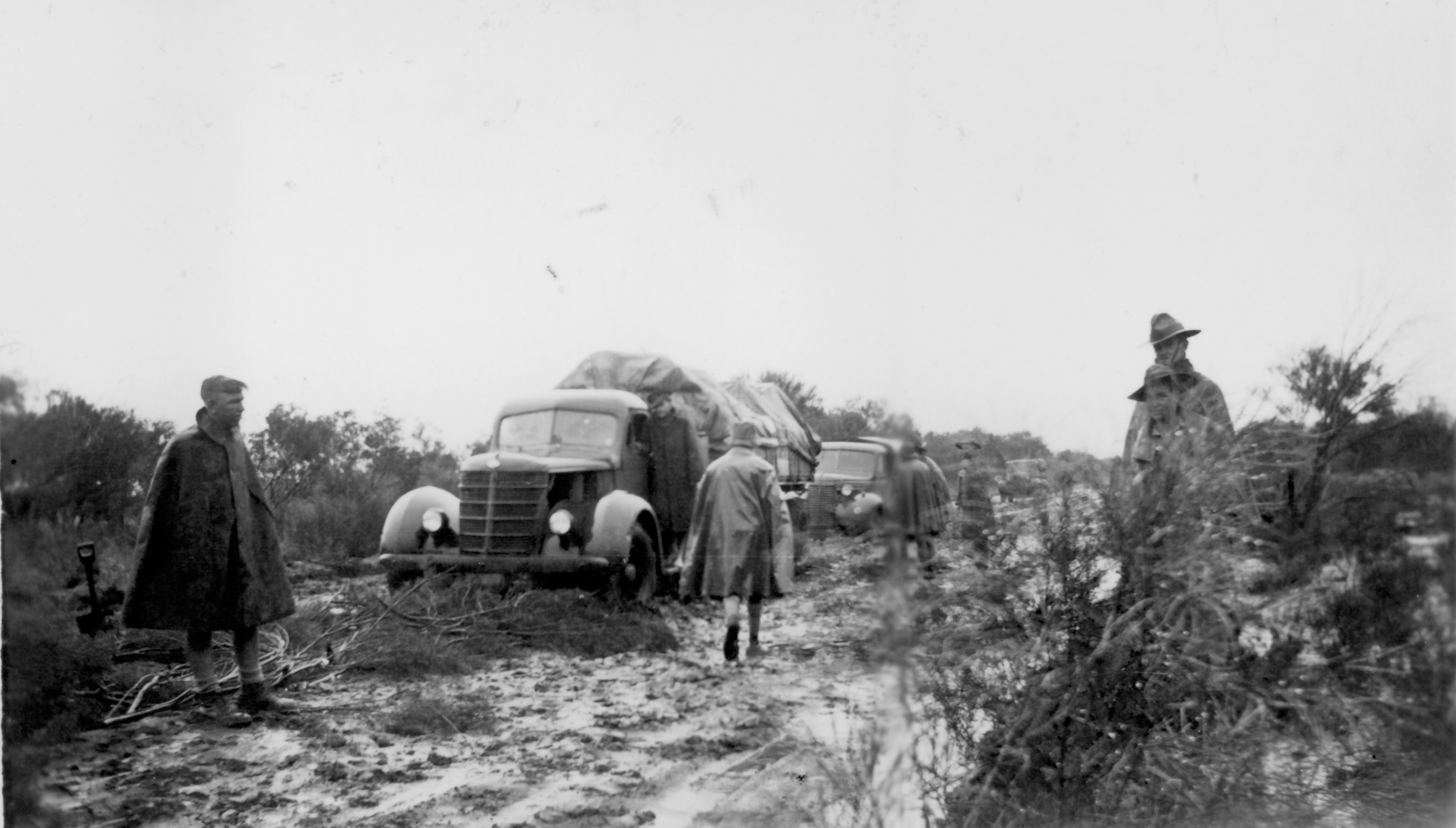
The highway after rain in the 1940s while in the process of being upgraded, c1940s

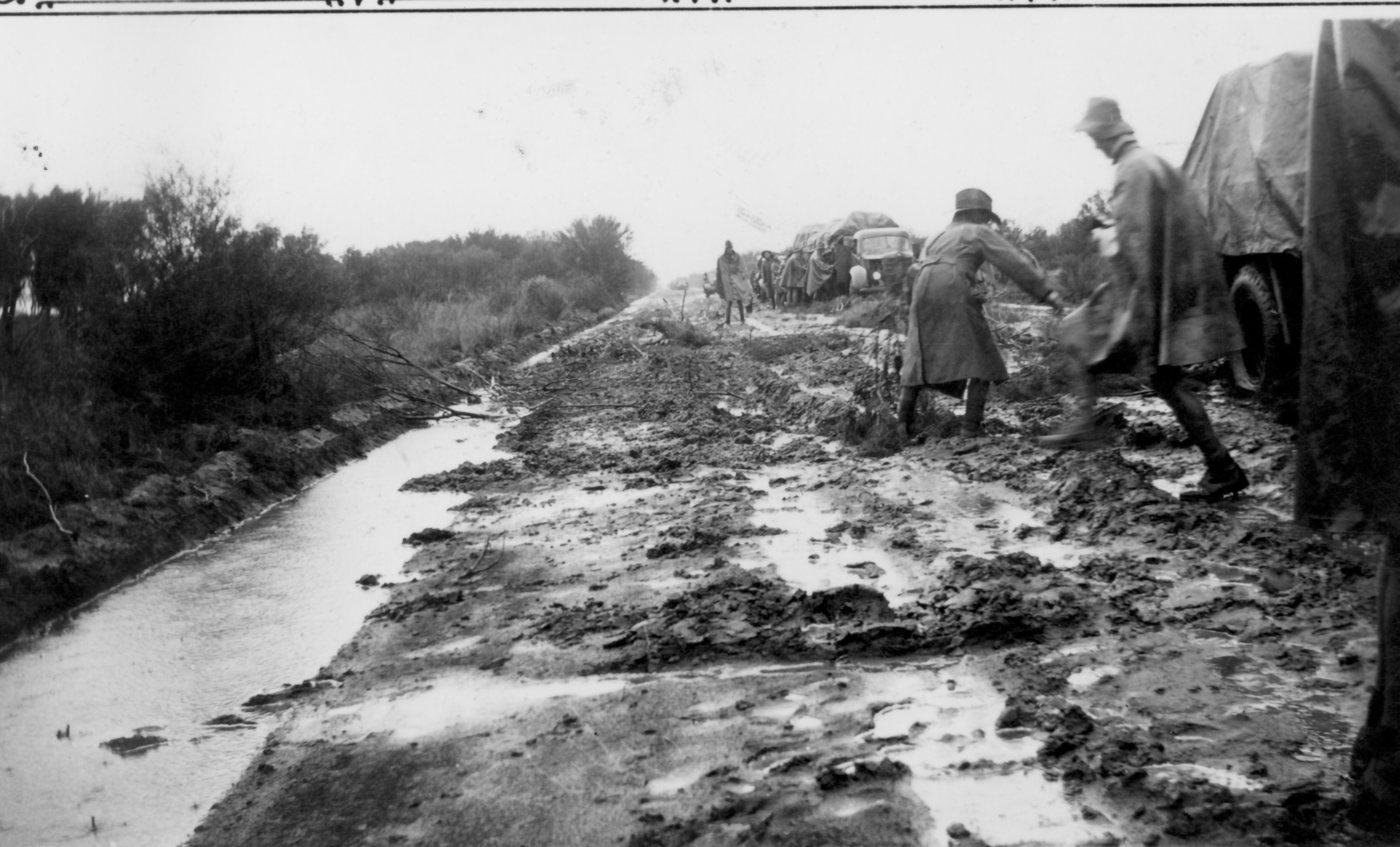
The highway after rain in the 1940s while in the process of being upgraded, c1940s

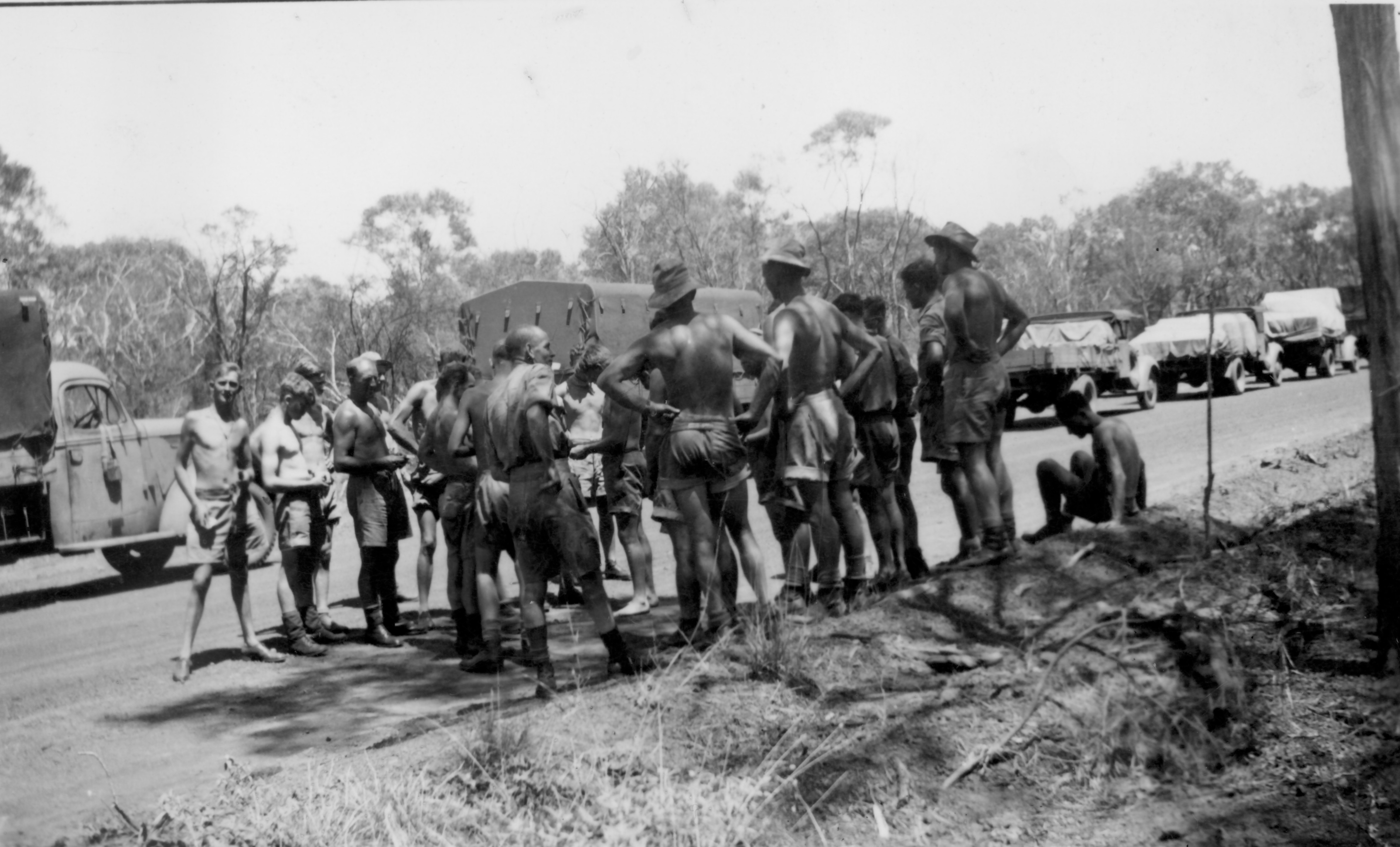
An army convoy taking at rest in the 1940s

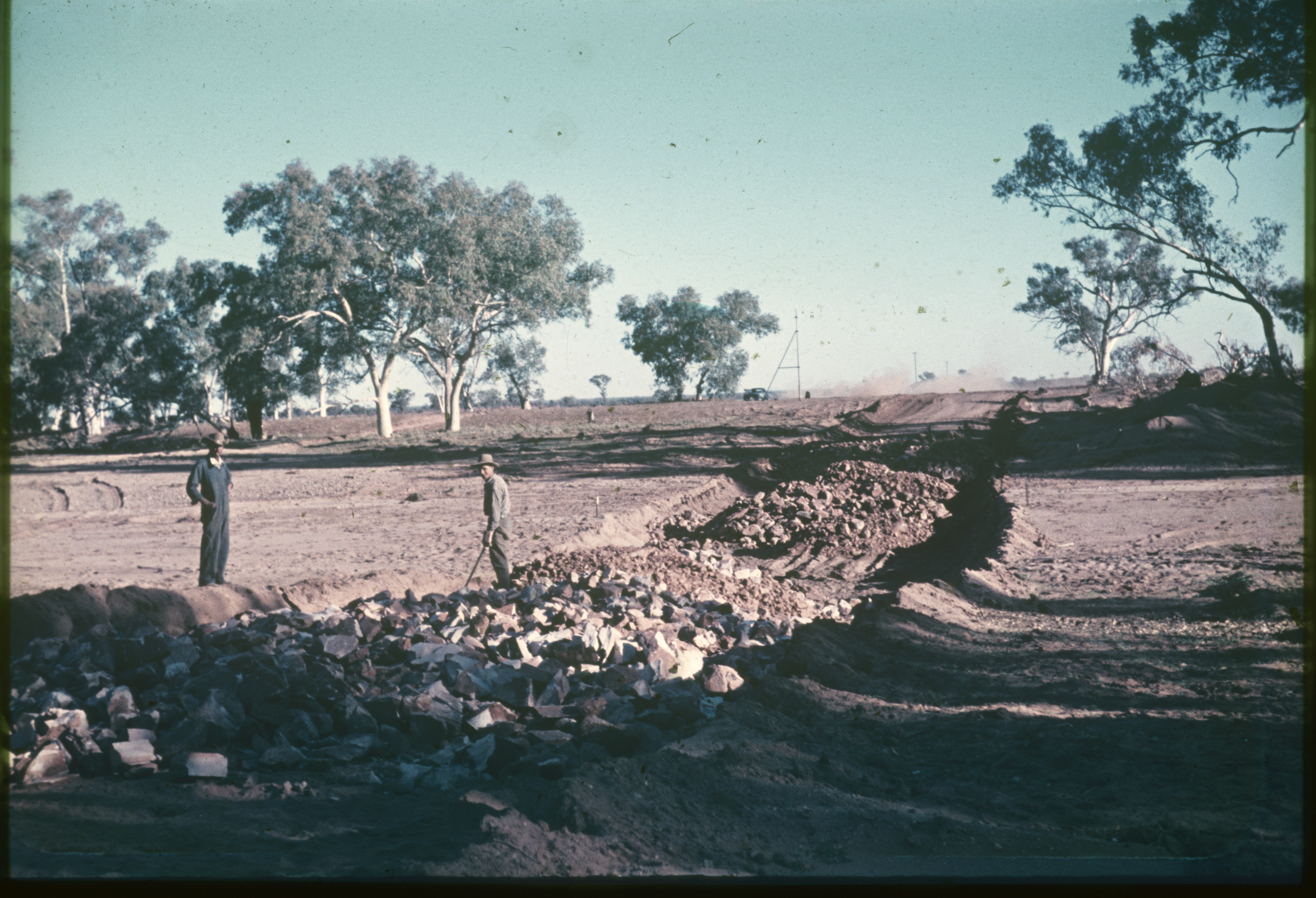
Work on the Stuart Highway south of Alice Springs (Mparntwe) by the Northern Territory Public Works Department, c1958

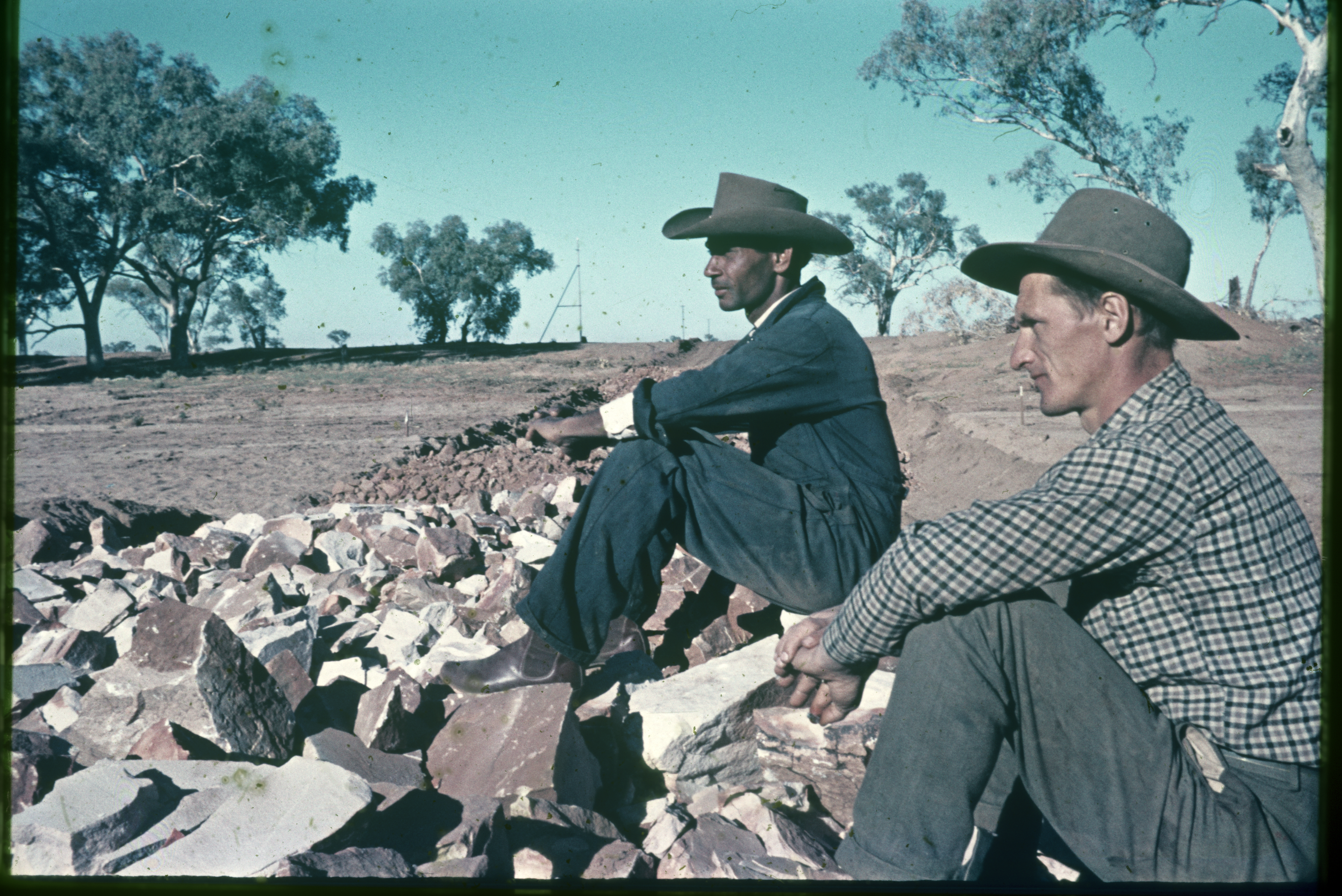
Work on the Stuart Highway south of Alice Springs (Mparntwe), c1958

=== Highway planning and construction ===
With the onset of World War II, supply roads leading to the north of the country were considered vital by the federal government. A central north–south highway was planned to connect the railheads at Alice Springs and Birdum, with surveying completed in August 1940. The task of constructing the highway was split between the Main Roads Departments of three states, to ensure completion before the next wet season. New South Wales would construct the northern section of 91 miles (146 km), Queensland the central section of 90 miles (145 km), and South Australia the southern section of 131 miles (211 km).

The Alice Springs–Birdum road was completed by December 1940, upgraded from an often impassable track to an all-weather sealed highway that could cope with heavy military traffic. The 306-mile (492 km) highway was built in under 90 days. In one week, 11 miles (18 km) was constructed, which was claimed to be a world record. The new highway, in conjunction with the railways at either end, reduced the impact of Darwin's isolation. Quick and efficient movement of military equipment and troop was possible, with the road remaining open throughout the wet season.

By March 1941, military authorities advocated extending the Alice Springs–Birdum road to Darwin. During the wet season, the road north of Birdum was impassable, which meant that a single railway line was the only connection through to Darwin. Construction was underway by October 1941, once again at a fast pace in an attempt to finish before the next wet season. The road was nearing completion in July 1942, although some sections were yet to be bitumenised.

However, the above section understates the fact that, in 1941, US Military "authorities" were horrified that there was not a "decent" all weather link between Darwin and Adelaide.

The U.S. military then worked alongside Australian forces and civilian groups to build and use the vital overland supply route between Alice Springs and Darwin (now known as the Stuart Highway). American and Australian engineering and transport units helped turn the rough track into a functional military supply line to move troops and equipment north after the Japanese attacks on Darwin, which were greater than those inflicted on Hawaii.

=== Speed limits ===
Before 1 January 2007 there was no absolute speed limit in the Northern Territory, but maximum speed limits are now posted along the length of Stuart Highway. Previously drivers were required only to travel at a safe speed for the conditions, meaning the Northern Territory section of Stuart Highway had no speed limits at all. The Northern Territory traffic laws were updated from 1 January 2007 to be similar to the rest of Australia. This included placing a speed limit on all roads (130 km/h or 81 mph on major highways such as Stuart Highway) and significantly increasing penalties for speeding.

The South Australian section is signposted as 110 km/h (68 mph) outside built-up regions, between Port Augusta and the Northern Territory border.

In October 2013 the Northern Territory Government announced a trial period of reverting to an open speed limit on the 200 km (120 mi) stretch between Alice Springs and Barrow Creek, beginning 1 February 2014. In September 2015, following the conclusion of the trial, a 276 km (171 mi) stretch of the highway had its speed limits derestricted. However, speed limits were restored to this stretch in November 2016; the highest is 130 km/h (81 mph).

In March 2021, the road was closed due to a serious accident 500 km north of Adelaide at Wirraminna where the road collapsed due to burning diesel fuel that melted the road's plastic culverts. Plastic culverts had been used in place of concrete as they were seen as the best material for this particular location as the flood plain of the river is acidic and can destroy concrete culverts.

The road was closed while repair works took place. The asphalt also had to be given time to cure and the section of road underwent testing with a road train. With this now complete, both lanes are reopened with speed restrictions in place. Traffic signage is now in place and road users are asked to take extra care while travelling through this section of road.

== Junctions ==
State/Territory	LGA	Location	km	mi	Destinations	Notes
Northern Territory	Darwin	Darwin	0	0.0	Daly Street – Darwin	Northern terminus of highway and route A1 spur
Northern Territory	Litchfield	Humpty Doo	40	25	Arnhem Highway – Jabiru, Kakadu National Park	
Northern Territory	Litchfield	Livingstone	48	30	Cox Peninsula Road (B34) – Berry Springs, Cox Peninsula	
Northern Territory	Victoria Daly	Pine Creek	226	140	Kakadu Highway – Jabiru, Kakadu National Park	
Northern Territory	Katherine	Katherine	320	200	Victoria Highway (A1) – Kununurra, Broome, Perth	Route A1 continues west along Victoria Highway, southern terminus of route A1 spur
Northern Territory	Katherine	Venn	370	230	Central Arnhem Road (C24) – Bulman, Nhulunbuy	
Northern Territory	Roper Gulf	Mataranka	420	260	Roper Highway (B20) – Ngukurr	
Northern Territory	Roper Gulf	Daly Waters	590	370	Carpentaria Highway (B1) – Borroloola	Southern terminus of route A1, route B1 continues east along Carpentaria Highway; Northern terminus of route A87
Northern Territory	Roper Gulf	Birdum	625	388	Buchanan Highway (C80) – Top Springs	
Northern Territory	Barkly	Warumungu	965	600	Barkly Highway (National Highway 66) – Mount Isa, Cloncurry	"Threeways", north of Tennant Creek
Northern Territory	MacDonnell	Burt Plain	1,431	889	Plenty Highway (C12) – Atitjere, Tobermorey	Sandover Highway branches after 27 km
Northern Territory	MacDonnell	Burt Plain	1,479	919	Tanami Road (C5) – Yuendumu, Halls Creek	
Northern Territory	Alice Springs	Alice Springs	1,499	931	Larapinta Drive (B6) – Hermannsburg, Kings Canyon	
Northern Territory	MacDonnell	Erldunda	1,700	1,100	Lasseter Highway (A4) – Hermannsburg, Uluru (Ayers Rock)	
State border			1,790	1,110	Northern Territory – South Australia state border	
South Australia	Pastoral Unincorporated Area	Marla	1,948	1,210	Oodnadatta Track – Oodnadatta, William Creek, Marree	
South Australia	Coober Pedy	Coober Pedy	2,183	1,356	Anne Beadell Highway – Emu Field, Neale Junction, Laverton	
South Australia	Pastoral Unincorporated Area	Pimba	2,548	1,583	Olympic Dam Highway (B97) – Woomera, Roxby Downs, Olympic Dam, Andamooka	
South Australia	Port Augusta	Port Augusta West	2,719	1,690	Eyre Highway (A1 west) – Ceduna, Norseman, Perth; Augusta Highway (A1 east) – Snowtown, Port Wakefield, Adelaide	Southern terminus of highway and route A87
1.000 mi = 1.609 km; 1.000 km = 0.621 mi: Route transition

== Motor racing ==
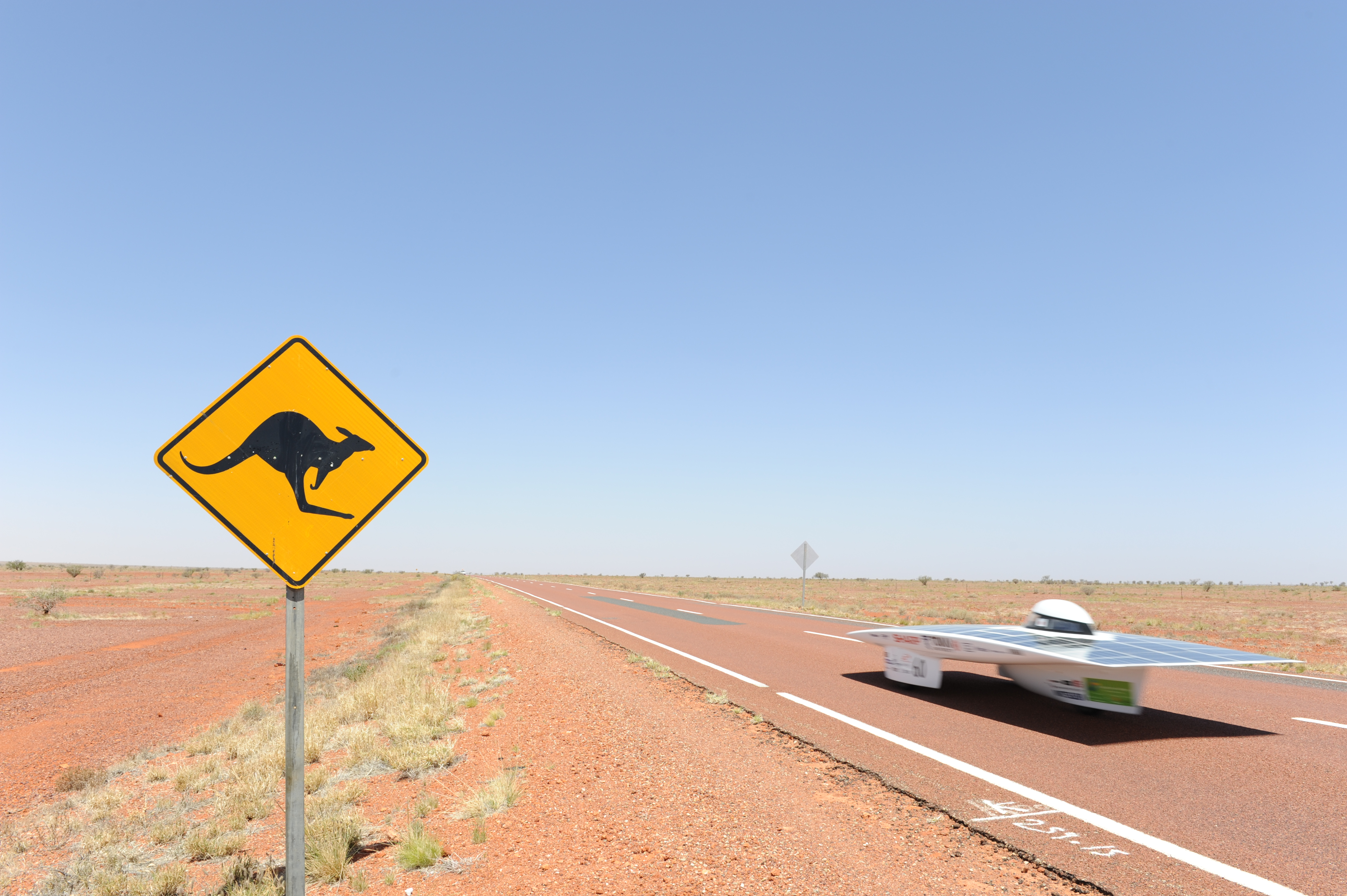
Solar car "Tokai Challenger" during the 2009 World Solar Challenge

Motor races have been proposed or undertaken on the highway since the 1950s.

In 1994 the first and only Cannonball Run in Australia ran from Darwin to Yulara and back again. Based on similar events in the United States, this event ended in tragedy when an out-of-control Ferrari F40 crashed into a checkpoint south of Alice Springs, resulting in the death of the two event officials manning the checkpoint as well as the two competitors. The remainder of the race had a 180 km/h (112 mph) speed limit imposed to prevent further accidents.

Stuart Highway is the highway taken in the World Solar Challenge. The 3,000 kilometres (1,900 mi) race starts in Darwin, follows Stuart Highway to Port Augusta, and then Highway 1 through to Adelaide.

== Engineering heritage award ==
Stuart Highway North received a Historic Engineering Marker from Engineers Australia as part of its Engineering Heritage Recognition Program.

== See also ==
- Highways in Australia
- List of highways in the Northern Territory
- List of highways in South Australia
