= List of highways in the Northern Territory =

Location of the Northern Territory

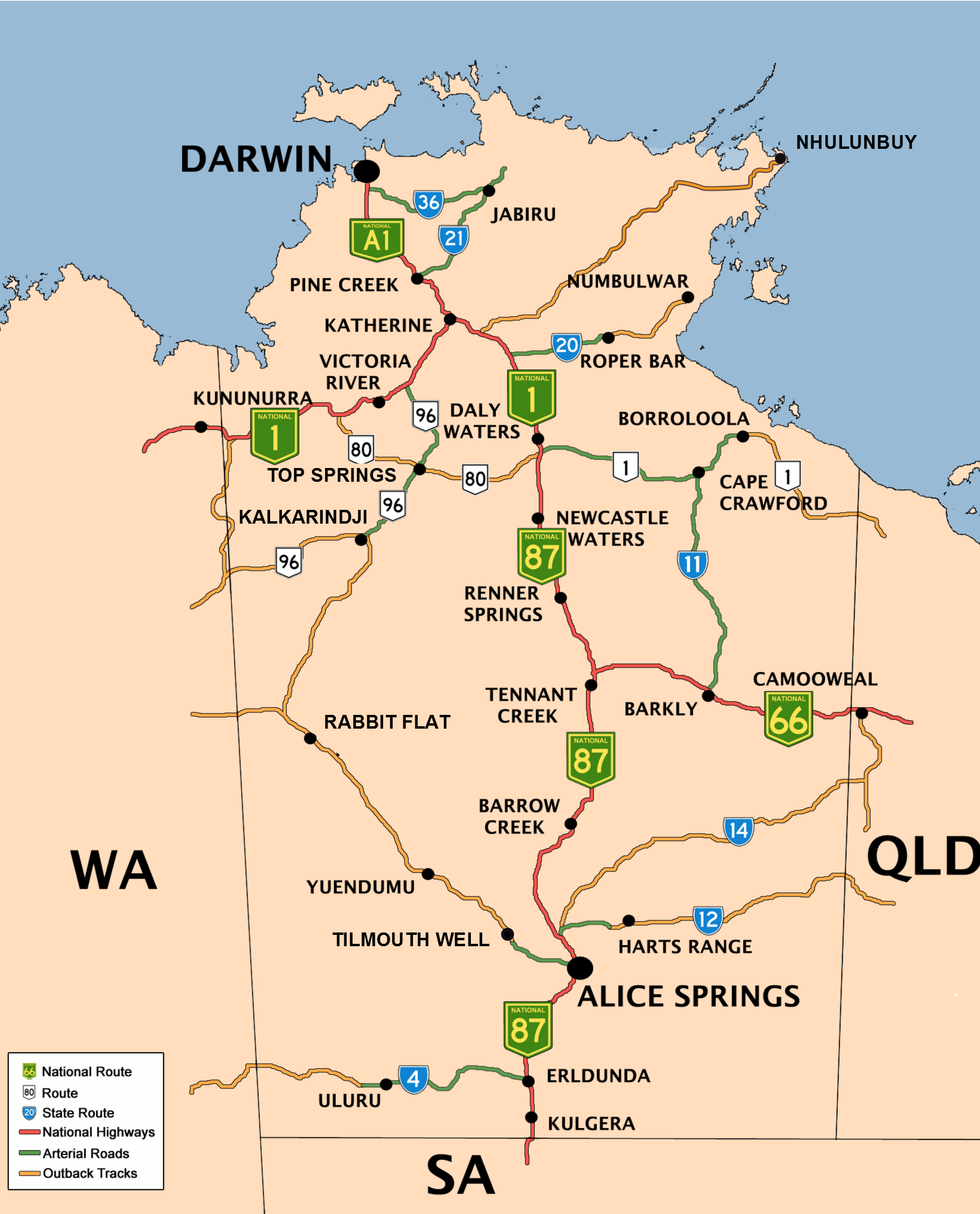
Roads of the Northern Territory

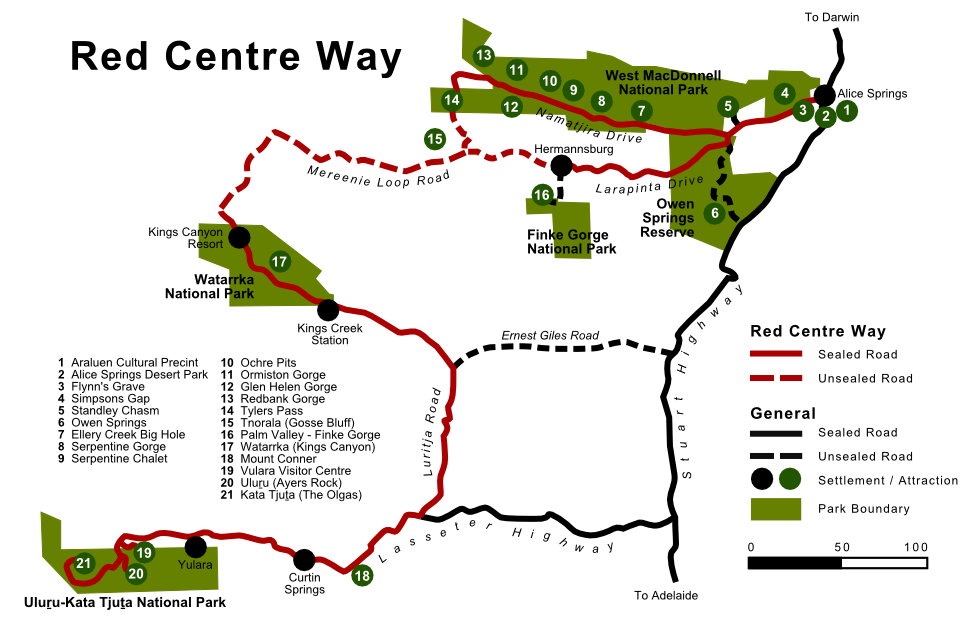
Map of roads in the region south-west of Alice Springs

The Northern Territory is the most sparsely populated state or territory in Australia. Despite its sparse population, it has a network of sealed roads which connect Darwin and Alice Springs, the major population centres, the neighbouring states, and some other centres such as Uluru (Ayers Rock), Kakadu and Litchfield National Parks. Some of the sealed roads are single lane bitumen. Many unsealed (dirt) roads connect the remoter settlements. Major roads are classified into three categories: National Highway, Arterial Roads, and Secondary Roads.

== National Highways ==
There are three National Highways in the Northern Territory:

- (*) Stuart Highway (National Highway 1 / National Highway 87)
- (*) Victoria Highway (National Highway 1)
- (* or) Barkly Highway (National Highway 66)

== Arterial Roads ==
The following roads are classified as Arterial Roads:

- Arnhem Highway (A36)
- Buntine Highway (B96)
- Carpentaria Highway (B1)
- Central Arnhem Road (C24)
- Kakadu Highway (A21/B21)
- Lasseter Highway (B4)
- Plenty Highway (State Route 12)
- Tablelands Highway (State Route 11)
- Tanami Road (C5)

== Secondary Roads ==
The following roads are classified as Secondary Roads:

- Barkly Stock Route
- Buchanan Highway
- Calvert Road
- Cox Peninsula Road
- Daly River Road
- Darwin River Road
- Dorat Road
- Ernest Giles Road
- Gun Point Road
- Jim Jim Road
- Larapinta Drive
- Litchfield Road
- Luritja Road
- Mt Denison Road
- Nathan River Road
- Ranken Road
- Roper Highway
- Ross Highway
- Sandover Highway
- Savannah Way
- Tjukaruru Road

== See also ==
- Highways in Australia for highways in other states and territories
- List of highways in Australia for roads named as highways, but not necessarily classified as highways
- List of road routes in the Northern Territory
