= Roper Highway =

Highway in the Northern Territory

Roper Highway Northern Territory
- Roper Highway (depicted in blue)

General information
- Type: Rural road
- Length: 206 km (128 mi)
- Route number(s): B20 (Mataranka – Ngukurr)

Major junctions
- SW end: Stuart Highway, Mataranka
- NE end: Ngukurr

Location(s)
- Major settlements: Elsey, Roper Valley, Roper Bar, Ngukurr

The Roper Highway is a road in the Northern Territory of Australia that begins from a point on the Stuart Highway 7 kilometres south of Mataranka, and runs east along the Roper River via Roper Bar to Ngukurr. Its length is 206 kilometres. From Ngukurr the road continues for approximately 153 kilometres to Numbulwar on the Gulf of Carpentaria as the Numbulwar Road. The section of the highway between Roper Bar and Ngukurr is also known as the Ngukurr Access.

== See also ==
- Highways in Australia
- List of highways in the Northern Territory
