= Arnhem Highway =

Highway in the Northern Territory

Arnhem Highway Northern Territory
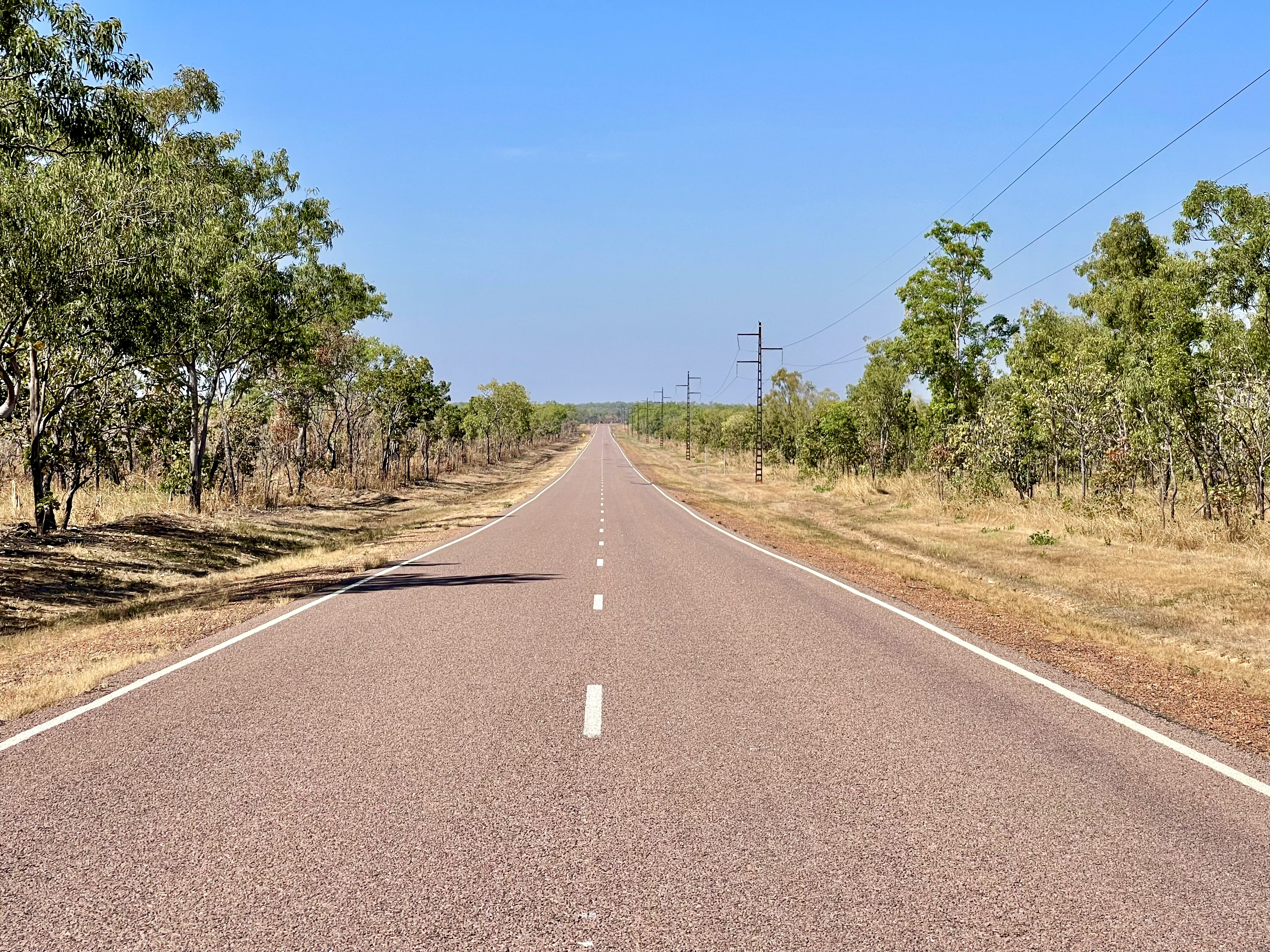
- Arnhem Highway in Marrakai in 2021

General information
- Type: Highway
- Length: 227 km (141 mi)
- Route number(s): State Route 36

Major junctions
- West end: Stuart Highway (National Highway 1), McMinns Lagoon
- Jim Jim Road; Kakadu Highway (State Route 21)
- East end: Oenpelli Road, Jabiru, Northern Territory

Location(s)
- Major settlements: Middle Point, Marrakai, Kakadu National Park

Highway system
- Highways in Australia; National Highway • Freeways in Australia; Highways in the Northern Territory

The Arnhem Highway is a 227 km (141 mi) highway in the Northern Territory, Australia. It links the town of Jabiru and Kakadu National Park to the Stuart Highway near Humpty Doo, south of Darwin.

== Upgrades ==
The Northern Australia Roads Program announced in 2016 included the following project for Arnhem Highway.

=== Floodplain upgrade ===
The project to upgrade the Adelaide River floodplain is to be complete in early 2022 at a total cost of $77.9 million.

== Major intersections ==
| LGA | Location | km | mi | Destinations | Notes |
|---|---|---|---|---|---|
| Litchfield | Bees Creek, Humpty Doo, McMinns Lagoon tripoint | 0 | 0.0 | Stuart Highway (National Highway 1) north – Darwin / south – Noonamah | Western end of Arnhem Highway (State Route 36) |
| Adelaide River | | 32.1– 32.2 | 19.9– 20.0 | Bridge – no known name | |
| Mary River | | 78.4 | 48.7 | Bridge – no known name | |
| Kakadu National Park | | 117 | 73 | Western boundary of Kakadu National Park. The remainder of the highway is within the park. | |
| South Alligator River | | 180 | 110 | Bridge – no known name | |
| West Arnhem | Kakadu National Park / Jabiru boundary | 216 | 134 | Kakadu Highway (State Route 21) south – Pine Creek | Eastern end of State Route 36. Arnhem Highway continues east with no shield. |
| West Arnhem | Kakadu National Park | 227 | 141 | Oenpelli Road north – Gunbalanya | Eastern end of Arnhem Highway. Oenpelli Road is also referred to as Arnhem Highway. Oenpelli Road is a no through road. Access via intersection at 214 km. |
1.000 mi = 1.609 km; 1.000 km = 0.621 mi: Route transition

== See also ==
- Highways in Australia
- List of highways in the Northern Territory
