= Kakadu Highway =

Highway in the Northern Territory

Kakadu Highway Northern Territory

General information
- Type: Highway
- Length: 209 km (130 mi)
- Route number(s): State Route 21

Major junctions
- SW end: Stuart Highway, Pine Creek, Northern Territory
- Jim Jim Road
- NE end: Arnhem Highway, Jabiru, Northern Territory

Location(s)
- Major settlements: Kakadu National Park

Highway system
- Highways in Australia; National Highway • Freeways in Australia; Highways in the Northern Territory

The Kakadu Highway is 209 kilometres long and extends from Pine Creek to Jabiru, entering Kakadu National Park as the highway crosses the Mary River. The highway is signed and mapped as State Route 21.

== See also ==
- Highways in Australia
- List of highways in the Northern Territory
