= Olympic Dam Highway =

Outback road in South Australia

Olympic Dam Highway South Australia
- Coordinates: 31.259408°S 136.804349°E (South end); 30.478884°S 136.890095°E (North end)

General information
- Type: Highway
- Length: 92.5 km (57 mi)
- Route number(s): B97 (1998–present)

Major junctions
- South end: Stuart Highway; Pimba, South Australia
- Andamooka Road
- North end: Borefield Road; Olympic Dam, South Australia

Location(s)
- Region: Far North
- Major settlements: Woomera, Roxby Downs

Highway system
- Highways in Australia; National Highway • Freeways in Australia; Highways in South Australia

Olympic Dam Highway is a sealed, 92-kilometre-long (57-mile), outback highway in South Australia that runs from Stuart Highway in Pimba to Olympic Dam via Woomera. The road also provides access to the town of Roxby Downs. It is designated route B97.

== Route ==
Olympic Dam Highway commences at the intersection with Stuart Highway at Pimba and heads north, crossing the Trans-Australia railway line shortly afterwards, passing Woomera not long after, and continues in a northerly direction through arid zones for some distance before the old alignment of the highway, now named Olympic Way, branches northwest to Roxby Downs, meeting with it again some kilometres to the north as it bypasses the town to the east. It continues north until eventually reaching the Olympic Dam Village a short distance later, and eventually ending at the intersection with Borefield Road, just before the security checkpoint at the entrance to the Olympic Dam mine site.

== History ==
Olympic Dam Highway had no previous route marker until South Australia's conversion to their newer alphanumeric system in 1998, when it was allocated route B97.

In January 2022, Olympic Dam Highway was cut due to a section of the road being washed out. The same section of road was also washed out in October 2022.

== Major intersections ==
LGA	Location	km	mi	Destinations	Notes
Pastoral Unincorporated Area	Pimba	0.0	0.0	Stuart Highway (A87) – Port Augusta, Coober Pedy	Southern terminus of highway and route B97
Pastoral Unincorporated Area	Pimba	0.9	0.56	Trans-Australian railway line	
Pastoral Unincorporated Area	Woomera	6.6	4.1	Banool Avenue – Woomera	
Pastoral Unincorporated Area	Woomera	8.0	5.0	private road to RAAF Base Woomera	T intersection
Roxby	Roxby Downs	79.4	49.3	Olympic Way (south) – Roxby Downs	
Roxby	Roxby Downs	83.3	51.8	Andamooka Road – Andamooka	
Roxby	Roxby Downs	88.6	55.1	Olympic Way (north) – Roxby Downs	T intersection
Roxby	Olympic Dam Village	92.0	57.2	Blinman Road – Olympic Dam, Olympic Dam Airport	
Roxby	Olympic Dam Village	92.5	57.5	Borefield Road (east) – Stuarts Creek, Marree, William Creek	Northern terminus of highway and route B97; Road continues north as private road into Olympic Dam mine site
Route transition
