= Highway 1 (Victoria) =

Network of highways in Victoria, Australia

Highway 1 Victoria
- Map of Victoria with Highway 1 highlighted in red

General information
- Type: Highway
- Length: 958 km (595 mi)
- Opened: 1955
- Route number(s): M1; (Traralgon to Kooyong); (Southbank to Colac); M1 (Tolled); (Kooyong to Southbank); A1; (NSW border to Traralgon); (Colac to SA border)

Major junctions
- VIC/NSW border end: near Genoa
- Monaro Highway; Great Alpine Road; South Gippsland Highway; Strzelecki Highway; Princes Highway; South Gippsland Freeway; EastLink; CityLink; West Gate Tunnel; Western Ring Road; Midland Highway; Hamilton Highway; Great Ocean Road; Hopkins Highway; Henty Highway
- VIC/SA border end: near Dartmoor

Location(s)
- Major settlements: Orbost, Bairnsdale, Sale, Traralgon, Warragul, Melbourne, Geelong, Camperdown, Warrnambool, Portland

Highway system
- Highways in Australia; National Highway • Freeways in Australia; Highways in Victoria

In Victoria, Highway 1 is a 958-kilometre (595 mi) long route that follows the coastline of the state, from the New South Wales border near Genoa to the South Australian border near Dartmoor. Highway 1 continues around the rest of Australia, joining all mainland state capitals, and connecting major centres in Tasmania. All roads within the Highway 1 system are allocated a road route numbered 1, M1, A1, or B1, depending on the state route numbering system. In Victoria, the highway is designated as route M1 between Traralgon and Colac, and route A1 elsewhere.

== History ==
Highway 1 was created as part of the National Route Numbering system, adopted in 1955. The route was compiled from an existing network of state and local roads and tracks.

== Route description ==
The Victorian section of Highway 1 travels south from the New South Wales border to Morwell as the Princes Highway. The highway then becomes the M1 motorway, following the Princes Freeway to the Melbourne suburb of Berwick, and then the Monash Freeway to central Melbourne. Highway 1, as the CityLink Tollway bypasses the actual city centre, connecting to the West Gate Freeway. Beyond the Western Ring Road interchange, the route is once again named Princes Freeway, which leads to Geelong, with the dual carriageway M1 ending in Winchelsea. Highway 1 continues, designated as A1, along the rest of the Princes Highway, through to the South Australian border, west of Dartmoor.

The following sections, which are freeways or dual carriageways, are designated as route M1:

- Princes Freeway from Traralgon to Berwick.
  - Eastern extension of dual carriageway M1 to Sale built, however route number is yet to be changed to M1.
- Monash Freeway from Berwick to Central Melbourne.
- CityLink (southern link section): Central Melbourne (through Domain and Burnley Tunnels).
- West Gate Freeway from Melbourne to West Gate Interchange.
  - Massive re-construction in progress as part of the M1 Upgrade.
  - The M1 freeway upgrade receives an ITS Australia award.
- Princes Freeway from West Gate Interchange to Corio.
- Geelong Ring Road from Corio to Waurn Ponds.
- Dual carriageway M1 continues to Colac.
  - M1 under construction to Colac & Camperdown.

== See also ==
- Highway 1 (New South Wales)
- Highway 1 (Northern Territory)
- Highway 1 (Queensland)
- Highway 1 (South Australia)
- Highway 1 (Tasmania)
- Highway 1 (Western Australia)
