= Buntine Highway =

Highway in the Northern Territory and Western Australia

Buntine Highway Western Australia–Northern Territory
- Map of north-western Australia with Buntine Highway highlighted in red

General information
- Type: Rural road
- Length: 581 km (361 mi)
- Route number(s): National Route 96 (WA/NT border – Victoria Highway); B96 (future route number in Northern Territory)
- Former route number: National Route 80 (Nicholson – Top Springs)

Major junctions
- West end: Duncan Road, Nicholson, Western Australia
- Buchanan Highway (National Route 80)
- East end: Victoria Highway (National Highway 1), Delamere, Northern Territory

Location(s)
- Major settlements: Kalkarindji, Top Springs

The Buntine Highway is a 581-kilometre highway in the Northern Territory and Western Australia. It runs from the Victoria Highway via Top Springs and Kalkarindji and then to Nicholson, Western Australia. The section from the Victoria Highway to Kalkaringi is a single-lane sealed road with a few dual-lane sections; the remaining section is unsealed. Funding for maintenance is provided by the Northern Territory government.

The highway was named in 1996 after Noel Buntine who established a livestock transportation business known as Buntine Roadways in the 1950s in northern Australia.

== Upgrades ==
The Northern Australia Roads Program announced in 2016 included the following project for the Buntine Highway.

=== Road upgrading ===
The project for pavement strengthening, widening and sealing on priority sections is to be complete in mid 2022 at a total cost of $48.1 million.

== Major intersections ==
The only major intersection on this road is with the Buchanan Highway (National Route 80) at Top Springs.

== See also ==
- Highways in Australia
- List of highways in the Northern Territory
- List of highways in Western Australia
