= Top Springs, Northern Territory =

Top Springs Northern Territory
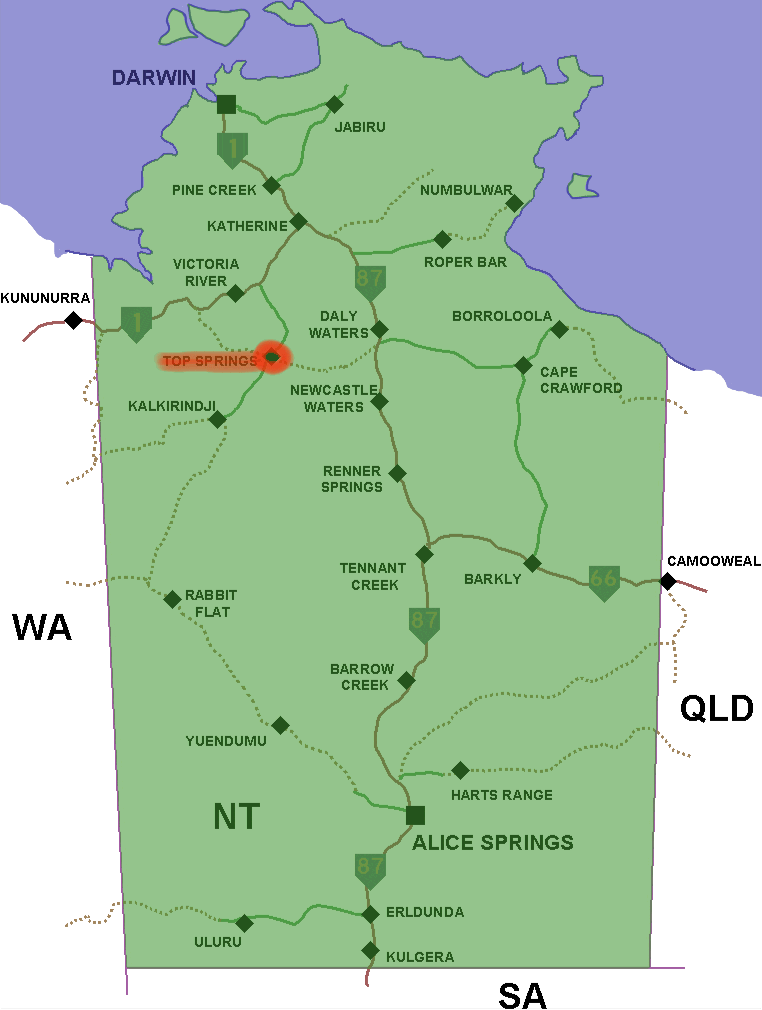
- Location in the Northern Territory (red)

- Coordinates: 16°32′38″S 131°47′52″E
- Population: 11 (2021 census)
  - Density: 3.94/km^{2} (10.2/sq mi)
- Established: 2 January 1976 (town); 4 April 2007 (locality)
- Postcode(s): 0852
- Area: 2.79 km^{2} (1.1 sq mi)
- Time zone: ACST (UTC+9:30)
- Location: 465 km (289 mi) S of Darwin
- LGA(s): Victoria Daly Region
- Territory electorate(s): Stuart
- Federal division(s): Lingiari
Mean max temp	Mean min temp	Annual rainfall
34.6 °C; 94 °F	19.6 °C; 67 °F	647.7 mm 25.5 in
Localities around Top Springs:
Victoria River	Victoria River	Victoria River
Victoria River	Top Springs	Victoria River
Victoria River	Victoria River	Victoria River
- Footnotes: Adjoining localities

Top Springs is a town and locality in the Northern Territory of Australia located about 465 kilometres (289 mi) south of the territory capital of Darwin at the junction of the Buchanan and Buntine highways. At the 2021 census, Top Springs had a population of 11

Top Springs consists of land around the intersection of the Buchanan and Buntine Highways of an area of about 2.79 square kilometres (1.08 sq mi) which was surveyed and proclaimed as a town in 1976. The locality's boundaries and name were gazetted on 4 April 2007. The locality is named after the town with the name being ultimately derived from springs located on the route of the Murranji Track. Development within the town/locality consists of a roadhouse.

Top Springs is located within the federal division of Lingiari, the territory electoral division of Stuart and the local government area of the Victoria Daly Region.
