= Buchanan Highway =

Highway in the Northern Territory

Buchanan Highway Northern Territory
- Map of north-western Australia with Buchanan Highway highlighted in red

General information
- Type: Track
- Length: 393 km (244 mi)
- Route number(s): C80

Major junctions
- West end: Victoria Highway (National Highway 1), Timber Creek
- Buntine Highway (National Route 96)
- East end: Stuart Highway (National Highway 87), Birdum

Location(s)
- via: Gregory National Park, Victoria River Downs, Top Springs

The Buchanan Highway in the Northern Territory, Australia, runs west from Birdum on the Stuart Highway crossing the Buntine Highway at Top Springs and eventually connecting with the Victoria Highway near Timber Creek. As of 2007, it was unsealed for its entire length, at 393 kilometres (244 mi). Funding for maintenance is provided by the Northern Territory Government.

The highway was named in 1966 after Nathaniel Buchanan, a pioneering drover who first brought cattle overland from Queensland to the Northern Territory in 1877 via the Murranji Track; which the highway largely replaced.

The highway originally ran from the Stuart Highway west to Top Springs, then Wave Hill and then to the southern end of the Duncan Road which is in Western Australia. In 1996 the portion from Top Springs to Duncan Road was renamed the Buntine Highway, while the road from Top Springs which joins the Victoria Highway near Timber Creek was renamed as the Buchanan Highway. In 1986 the name was extended to cover a short section of road between the Northern Territory / Western Australian border and Nicholson.

== Major intersections ==
The only major intersection on this road is with the Buntine Highway (National Route 96) at Top Springs.

== Adjacent properties ==
The 447,500 ha (1,106,000-acre) cattle station, Murranji Station, borders the Buchanan Highway, 90 kilometres (56 mi) north-west of Elliot. It has an outstation with access to the highway.
