= Victoria Highway =

Highway in the Northern Territory and Western Australia

Victoria Highway Western Australia–Northern Territory
- Map of north-western Australia with Victoria Highway highlighted in red
- Coordinates: 15°52′07″S 128°22′20″E (West end); 14°27′50″S 132°15′40″E (East end)

General information
- Type: Highway
- Length: 557 km (346 mi)
- Route number(s): National Highway 1; A1 (future route in Northern Territory)

Major junctions
- West end: Great Northern Highway (National Highway 1), 56 km south of Wyndham, Western Australia
- Duncan Road; Buchanan Highway (National Route 80); Buntine Highway (National Route 96)
- East end: Stuart Highway, (National Highway 1), Katherine, Northern Territory

Location(s)
- Major settlements: Kununurra, Victoria River

Highway system
- Highways in Australia; National Highway • Freeways in Australia; Highways in Western Australia; Highways in the Northern Territory

The Victoria Highway links the Great Northern Highway in Western Australia with the Stuart Highway in the Northern Territory. The highway is a part of the Perth to Darwin National Highway link. It is signed as National Highway 1, and is part of Highway 1, a circular route around Australia. It is 555 kilometres (345 mi) long, and most of the route – some 470 kilometres (290 mi) – lies within the Northern Territory. In some areas it runs in parallel with the Northern Territory's Victoria River, from which its name originates.

== History ==
Originally an Aboriginal songline walking trail that allowed for long-distance travel, trade, and ceremonial practices. The route was developed as a gravel road by Aboriginal workers for drovers in the 1950s to aid the beef industry. Improvements took place in the 1960s which tied in with the development of the Ord Irrigation Scheme, which enabled the introduction of road trains. It was designated as part of the National Highway in 1974 and was fully reconstructed and sealed to a good standard by the early 1990s. The highway serves pastoral, mining and tourism industries, as well as the Ord Irrigation Scheme agricultural development near Kununurra.

In 1987 the Duncan Highway between NT/WA border and the Great Northern Highway were renamed the Victoria Highway by the Nomenclature Committee.

== Route description ==
The highway is described as spectacular, with escarpment ranges, the unique boab trees and the mighty Victoria River that runs into deep valleys and spectacular gorges. Its eastern terminus is at Katherine which is renowned for the Katherine Gorge. In Western Australia, the access road to the Ord River Dam which holds back Lake Argyle – Australia's largest artificial lake – begins at the Victoria Highway just west of the Western Australia / Northern Territory border. The western terminus is at Great Northern Highway, south of Wyndham, Western Australia.

The highway connects the towns of Kununurra, Timber Creek, and Katherine

=== Flooding ===
The highway crosses Victoria River near Timber Creek, and this crossing is particularly flood-prone in the wet season. Water overtopping the bridge can cut the main Western Australia - Northern Territory link for days or even weeks during the November - April rainy period. It is not unheard of for the bridge surface to at times be submerged below 10 metres of floodwaters. Ultimately, in May 2008 a project was completed to replace the old bridge with a new one. At seven metres (23 feet) higher, the news bridge is high enough to avoid most floods. Only an average of one-in-twenty year floods will be high enough to flood over the new bridge. Additional bridges and height increases of other sections of the highway were undertaken at the same time.

== Major intersections ==
State	LGA	Location	km	mi	Destinations	Notes
Western Australia	Wyndham-East Kimberley	Lake Argyle	0	0.0	Great Northern Highway (National Highway 1 south) - Wyndham, Halls Creek	T-Junction: Victoria Highway continues west as Great Northern Highway; National Highway 1 concurrency terminus: continues south
Western Australia	Wyndham-East Kimberley	Lake Argyle	87.6	54.4	Western Australia / Northern Territory border	
Northern Territory	Victoria Daly	Baines	87.6	54.4	Western Australia / Northern Territory border	
Northern Territory	Victoria Daly	Baines	101	63	Duncan Road - Halls Creek	
Northern Territory	Victoria Daly	Timber Creek	300	190	Buchanan Highway (National Route 80) – Birdum	
Northern Territory	Victoria Daly	Delamere	432	268	Buntine Highway (National Route 96) - Nicholson	
Northern Territory	Katherine	Katherine	557	346	Stuart Highway (National Highway 1) - Darwin, Tennant Creek, Alice Springs	Eastern highway terminus
1.000 mi = 1.609 km; 1.000 km = 0.621 mi: Concurrency terminus
