= List of road routes in the Northern Territory =

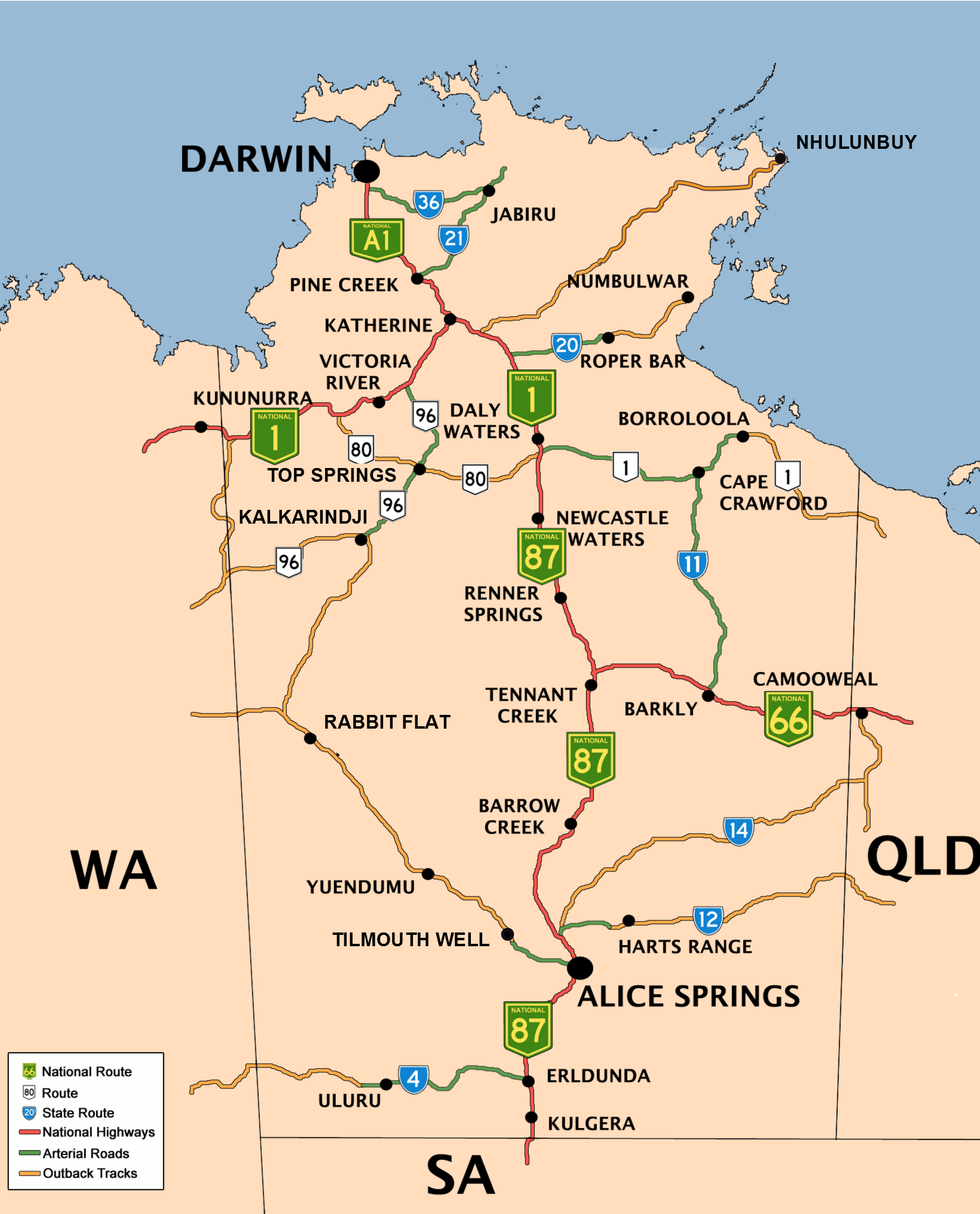
The Northern Territory's National Highways and Routes. Some other state routes and alphanumeric routes are also shown.

Road routes in the Northern Territory of Australia assist drivers navigating roads throughout the territory, by identifying important through-routes. The Northern Territory's National Highways are the main routes connecting Darwin to the adjacent states of Queensland, South Australia, and Western Australia. National Routes spur off the National Highways, and are other routes of national importance, while the remaining significant routes are designated as State Routes.

According to the Roads & Maritime Services, the Northern Territory has begun converting their numbered routes to alphanumeric routes, with a "progressive replacement" scheme that sees alphanumeric route markers introduced only when signs are replaced. The table below has a list of most signed alphanumeric routes.

== Alphanumeric routes ==
Below are the existing alpha numeric routes as of November 2020. Even though the Northern Territory has been converting to alphanumerics for more than two decades, only four routes are fully signed, and a former State Route 23 that is missing a letter in all of its signs and just says "23". Signage in the Northern Territory is very inconsistent. For example C24 in not signed at the Stuart Highway junction but signed further into the route. Most signs were like this and as such very few routes have been signed in the Northern Territory.

=== Roads of National Significance (A routes) ===
A-Routes are major roads that link major destinations like Stuart Highway which connects Darwin to Adelaide.

| Route | Component roads | From | To | Length | Notes |
|---|---|---|---|---|---|
| A1 | Victoria Highway; Stuart Highway | Daly Waters | WA–NT border (near Keep River National Park) | 743 km (462 mi) | Continues east to Daly Waters as |
| A1 | Stuart Highway | Darwin | Katherine | 2,834 km (1,761 mi) | Partially signed as alphanumeric route; spur section connecting to Darwin. Note that this is a separate route from the A1 that goes from WA to Daly Waters |
| A3 | Luritja Road | Petermann, Northern Territory | Watarrka National Park | 161 km (100 mi) | Partially signed as A3 |
| A4 | Lasseter Highway | Uluru | Erldunda | 244 km (152 mi) | Partially signed as B4 |
| A15 | Tiger Brennan Drive | Tivendale | Holtze | 6.7 km (4.2 mi) | |
| A21 | Kakadu Highway | Pine Creek | Kakadu | 58.4 km (36.2 mi) | |
| A36 | Arnhem Highway | Mount Bundey, Northern Territory | McMinns Lagoon | 78.4 km (49 mi) | Partially signed as alphanumeric route A36/B36 |
| A87 | Stuart Highway | SA–NT border (near Kulgera) | Daly Waters | 2,834 km (1,761 mi) | Has been partially signed as A87 |

=== Roads of State Significance (B routes) ===
B routes are routes that connect major settlements in the State but not eligible for A Rotes due to Road quality.

| Route | Component roads | From | To | Length | Notes |
|---|---|---|---|---|---|
| B1 | Carpentaria Highway | Daly Waters | Qld–NT border (near Wollogorang Airport) | 380 km (236 mi) | Continues north from Daly Waters as National Highway 1 Has been partially signed as B1 |
| B6 | Larapinta Drive | Watarrka National Park | Alice Springs | 325 km (202 mi) | Partially signed as B6 |
| B11 | Tablelands Highway | Tablelands | Cape Crawford | 375 km (233 mi) | See here |
| B20 | Roper Highway | Mataranka | Roper Bar | 206 km (128 mi) | Partially signed as alphanumeric route B20 |
| B21 | Kakadu Highway | Jabiru | Kakadu | 150.6 km (93.5 mi) | |
| B23 | Dorat Road | Adelaide River | Hayes Creek, Douglas-Daly | 65 km (40 mi) | Partially signed as 23 - It seems that the B is missing. Also there are no more State Route 23 signs, all of them have been replaced. |
| B30 | Litchfield Park Road; Rum Jungle Road; Batchelor Road | Blackmore | Coomalie Creek | 145 km (90 mi) | |
| B34 | Cox Peninsula Road | Noonamah | Cox Peninsula | 79.5 km (49 mi) | Partially signed as alphanumeric route B34 |
| B36 | Arnhem Highway | Kakadu National Park | Mount Bundey, Northern Territory | 148.6 km (92 mi) | Partially signed as alphanumeric route A36/B36 |
| B96 | Buntine Highway | Duncan Road, Nicholson, WA | Delamere | 581 km (361 mi) | Has been fully signed Partially unpaved |

=== Routes of Minor significance (C routes) ===
These are essentially roads that link minor settlements or areas that aren't eligible for an A or a B route.

| Route | Component roads | From | To | Length | Notes |
|---|---|---|---|---|---|
| C5 | Tanami Road | Burt Plain | WA–NT border (near Tanami) | 1,035 km (643 mi) | Partially signed as C5 Partially unpaved |
| C12 | Plenty Highway | Qld–NT border (near Tobermorey) | Burt Plain | 496 km (308 mi) | Signs on the Alice Springs Golf Club Facebook page shows a C12 sign |
| C16 | Barkly Stock Route; Tablelands Highway; Calvert Road | Lake Woods | Calvert | 251 km (156 mi) | See here |
| C24 | Central Arnhem Road | Bulman | Venn | 663 km (412 mi) | Signage very inconstant Partially unpaved |
| C80 | Buchanan Highway | Victoria Highway (29.4 km (18 mi) south-east of Timber Creek | Birdum | 393 km (244 mi) | Has been fully signed Partially unpaved |

== National Highways and Routes ==
There are three national highways and one current existing national route in the Northern Territory.

Current and former National Highways and Routes
| Route | Planned alphanumeric route | Component roads | From | To | Length | Notes |
Routes that haven't been replaced with an Alphanumeric Route
| National Highway 66 | A2 or A66 | Barkly Highway | Tennant Creek | Qld–NT border (near Ranken) | 754 km (469 mi) | |
Routes that have been replaced with an Alphanumeric Route
| National Highway 1 | A1 | Victoria Highway; Stuart Highway | WA–NT border (near Keep River National Park) | Daly Waters | 743 km (462 mi) | Mostly signed as alphanumeric route A1 Continues east from Daly Waters as B1 |
| National Highway 1 | A1 | Stuart Highway | Katherine | Darwin | 2,834 km (1,761 mi) | Mostly signed as alphanumeric route A1; spur section connecting to Darwin |
| National Highway 87 | A87 | Stuart Highway | Daly Waters | SA–NT border (near Kulgera) | 2,834 km (1,761 mi) | Mostly signed as A87 instead of National Highway 87 |
| National Route 1 | B1 | Carpentaria Highway | Daly Waters | Qld–NT border (near Wollogorang Airport) | 380 km (236 mi) | Continues north from Daly Waters as A1. Has been partially signed as B1. |
Fully decommissioned National Routes
| Former Route | Replaced alphanumeric route | Component roads | From | To | Length | Notes |
| National Route 80 | C80 | Buchanan Highway | Birdum | Victoria Highway (29.4 km (18 mi) south-east of Timber Creek | 393 km (244 mi) | Has been fully signed Partially unpaved |
| National Route 96 | B96 To Nicholson | Buntine Highway | Delamere | Duncan Road, Nicholson, WA | 581 km (361 mi) | Has been fully signed Partially unpaved |

== State Routes ==
State routes are numbered based on their position in the territory, generally increasing in number from south to north.

| Route | Planned Alphanumeric Replacement | Component roads | From | To | Length | Notes |
Routes that haven't been replaced with an Alphanumeric Route
| State Route 2 | B7 | Namatjira Drive | Larapinta Drive, Hugh | Larapinta Drive, Namatjira | 156 km (97 mi) | |
| State Route 12 | B12 | Plenty Highway | Burt Plain | Qld–NT border (near Tobermorey) | 496 km (308 mi) | |
| State Route 14 | C14 | Sandover Highway | Plenty Highway, Anmatjere | Qld–NT border (near Alpurrurulam) | 561 km (349 mi) | Unpaved |
| State Route 28 | B28 | Daly River Road; Port Keats Road | Robin Falls | Wadeye | 256 km (159 mi) | Not signed at all |
Routes that have been replaced with an Alphanumeric Route
| State Route 3 | A3 | Luritja Road | Lasseter Highway | Watarrka National Park | 161 km (100 mi) | Partially signed as A3 |
| State Route 4 | B4 | Lasseter Highway | Erldunda | Uluru | 244 km (152 mi) | Partially signed as A4/B4 |
| State Route 4 | C4 | Tjukaruru Road; Great Central Road | Uluru | WA–NT border (near Kaltukatjara) | 189 km (117 mi) | |
| State Route 5 | C5 | Tanami Road | Burt Plain | WA–NT border (near Tanami) | 1,035 km (643 mi) | Partially signed as C5 |
| State Route 6 | B6 | Larapinta Drive | Watarrka National Park | Alice Springs | 325 km (202 mi) | Partially signed as B6 |
| State Route 8 | B8 | Ross Highway; Arltunga Road | Ross | Arltunga Historical Reserve, Hart | 90 km (56 mi) | |
| State Route 11 | B11 | Tablelands Highway | Tablelands | Cape Crawford | 375 km (233 mi) | |
| State Route 16 | C16 | Barkly Stock Route; Tablelands Highway; Calvert Road | Lake Woods | Calvert | 251 km (156 mi) | |
| State Route 20 | B20 | Roper Highway | Mataranka | Roper Bar | 206 km (128 mi) | Partially signed as alphanumeric route B20 |
| State Route 23 – decommissioned | B23 | Dorat Road | Adelaide River | Hayes Creek, Douglas-Daly | 65 km (40 mi) | Partially signed as 23. However you will no longer be able to see a SR23 sign in the NT. |
| State Route 24 | C24 | Central Arnhem Road | Venn | Bulman | 663 km (412 mi) | Signage very inconstant. Partially signed as C24. |
| State Route 30 | B30 | Batchelor Road; Rum Jungle Road; Litchfield Park Road | Coomalie Creek | Blackmore | 145 km (90 mi) | Partially Signed |
| State Route 34 | B34 | Cox Peninsula Road | Noonamah | Cox Peninsula | 79.5 km (49 mi) | Partially signed as alphanumeric route B34 |

== See also ==
- List of highways in the Northern Territory
