= Red Centre Way =

Scenic route in Australia

Red Centre Way Northern Territory
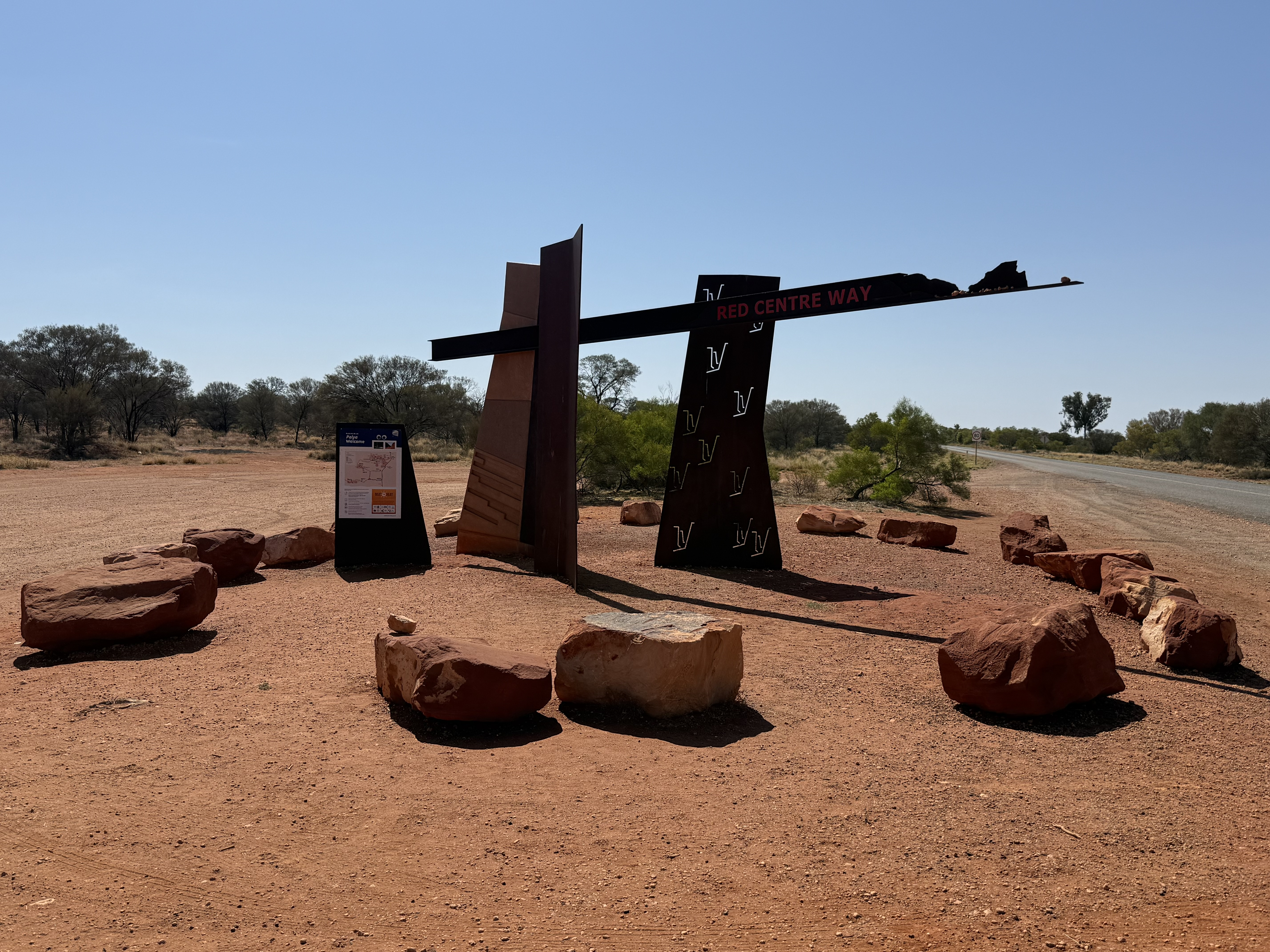
- Red Centre Way monument at the T intersection of Lasseter Highway and Luritja Road

General information
- Type: Road
- Length: 835 km (519 mi)

The Red Centre Way is a scenic route with a total length of 835 km, consisting of roads named Namatjira Drive, Luritja Road, Larapinta Drive and parts of the Lasseter Highway. Beginning in the city of Alice Springs, it connects the villages of Hermannsburg and Yulara, the Watarrka, West MacDonnell, Fink Gorge and Uluṟu-Kata Tjuṯa National Park, nature reserves such as Tnorala (Gosse Bluff) and Alice Springs Desert Park, and deserts, mountain ranges and many other unique tourist attractions.
