= Kings Canyon (Northern Territory) =

Canyon in Northern Territory, Australia

Coordinates: 24°15′29″S 131°33′45″E

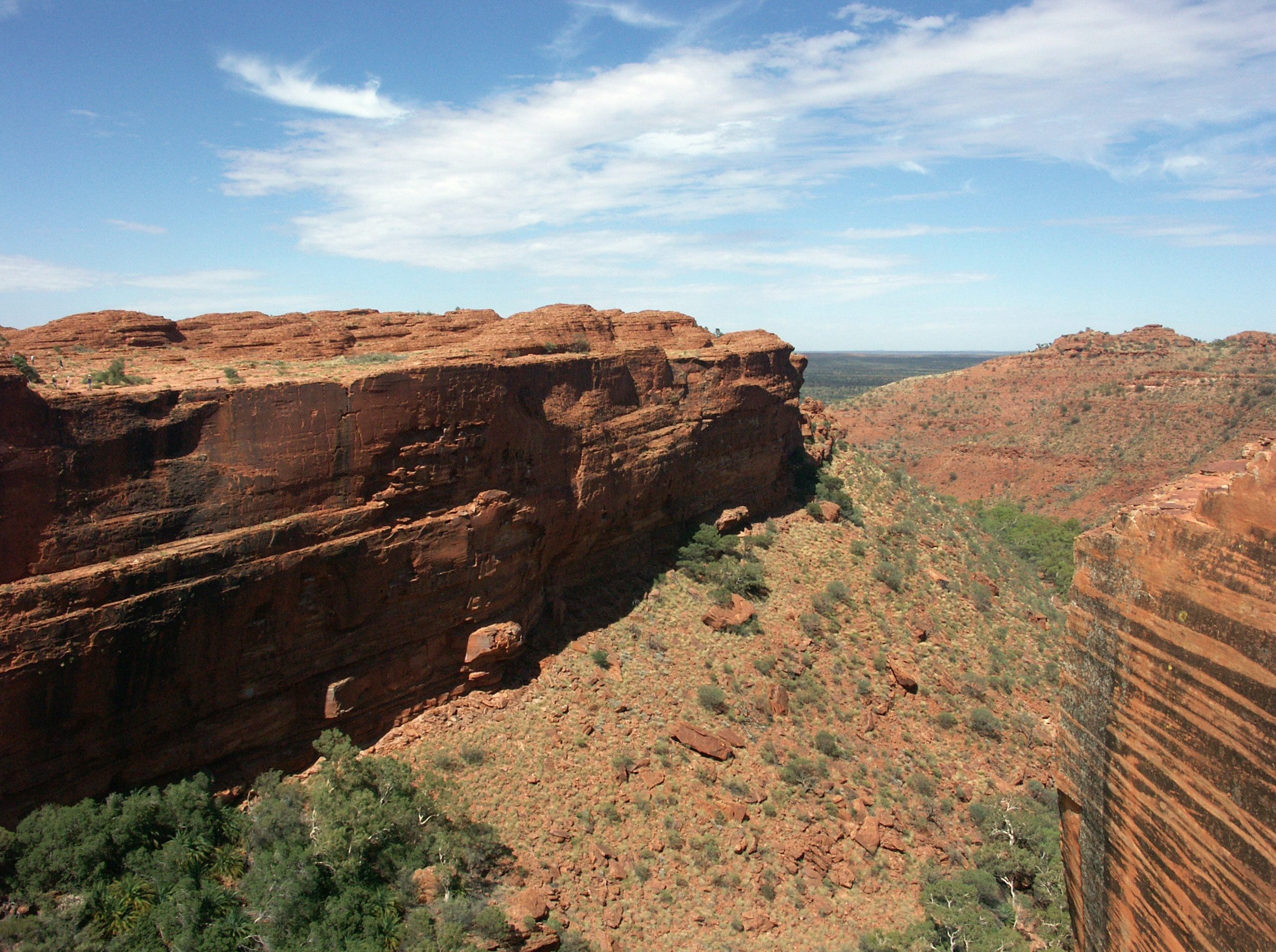
Overview of Kings Canyon from the Rim Walk

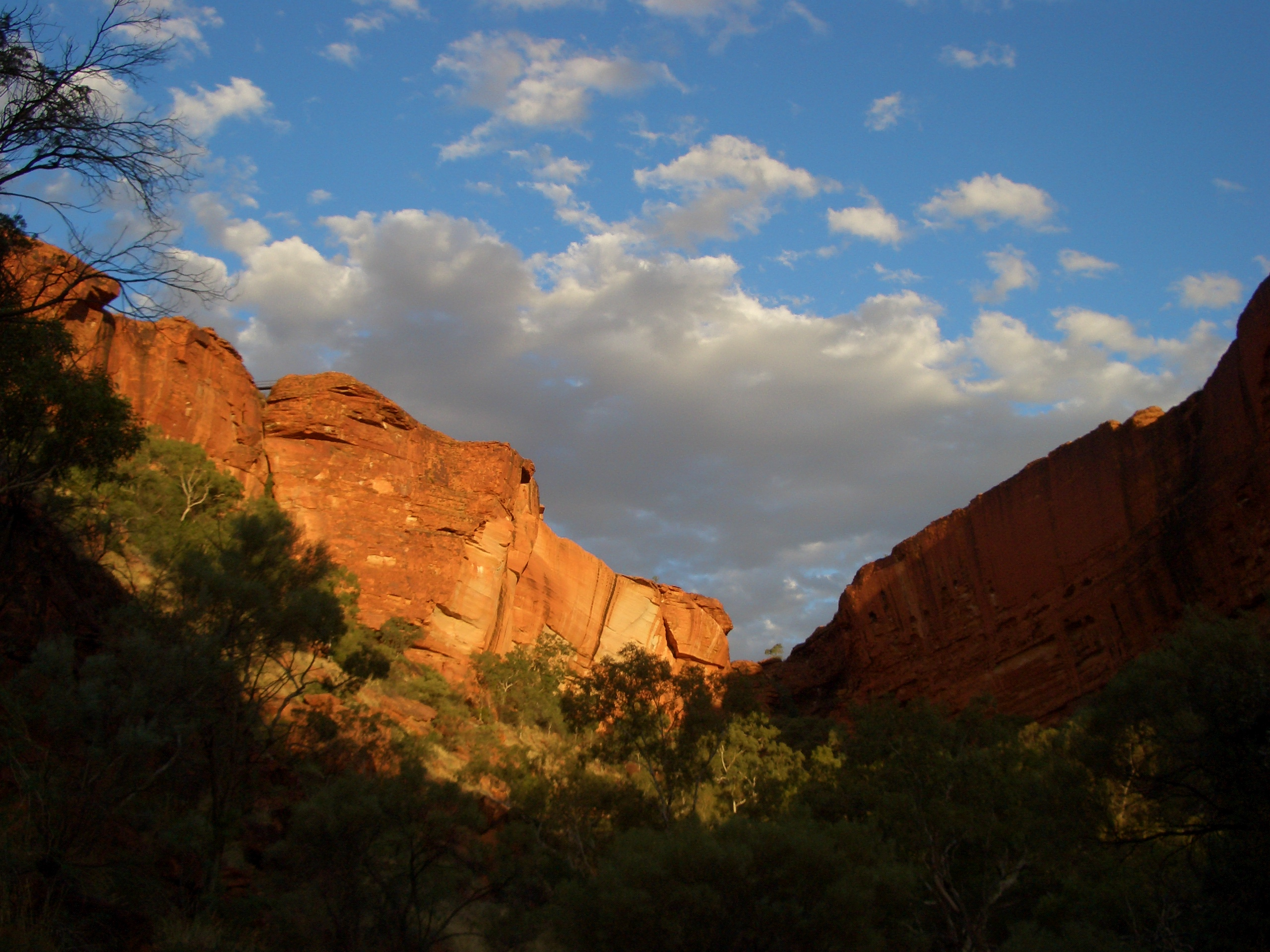
View from the gorge at sunset

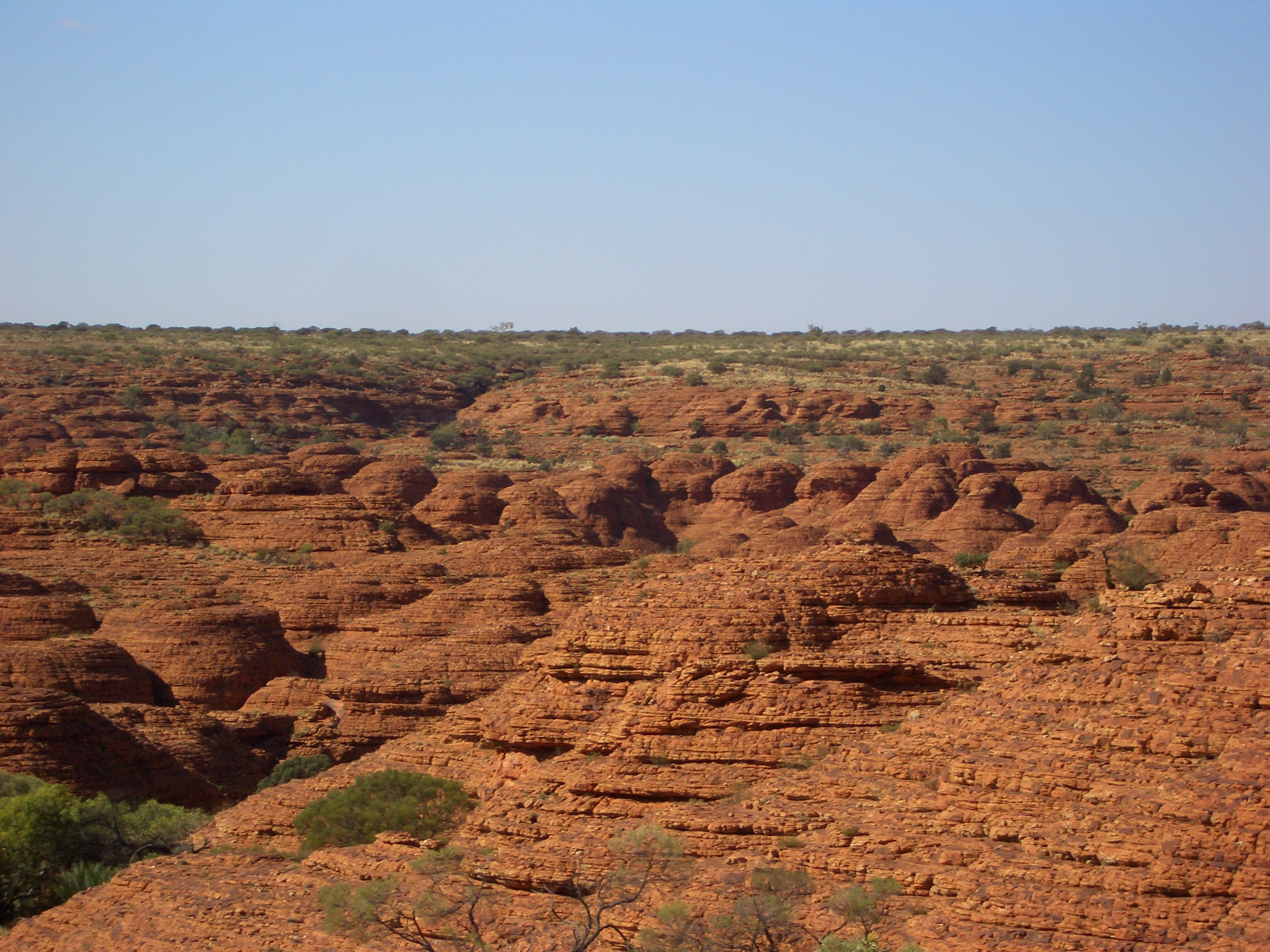
View of the sandstone domes at Kings Canyon

Kings Canyon, also known as Watarrka, is a canyon in the Northern Territory of Australia located at the western end of the George Gill Range about 321 kilometres (199 mi) southwest of Alice Springs and about 1,316 kilometres (818 mi) south of Darwin, within the Watarrka National Park.

== History ==
Luritja people have inhabited the area for at least 20,000 years.

Ernest Giles was an early English explorer who reached the canyon in 1872.

=== Name ===
Kings Creek runs along the bottom of the canyon and gives it its name. The creek was named by Giles in 1872. He wrote in his book Geographic Travels in Central Australia from 1872 to 1874: "I called King's Creek after Mr. Fielder King... an old and kind friend of mine".

The Aboriginal (Luritja and Arrernte) name for the creek and canyon is "Watarrka" (pronounced what-ARR-kah), which is the Luritja word for the local umbrella bush (Acacia ligulata) that grows in the vicinity. The national park thus gets its name from this landform.

== Location, access, and description ==
Kings Canyon is located 321 kilometres (199 mi) southwest of Alice Springs via Larapinta Drive (only accessible by 4WD), or 474 kilometres (295 mi) along the Stuart Highway, Lasseter Highway, and the Red Centre Way, which are all sealed.

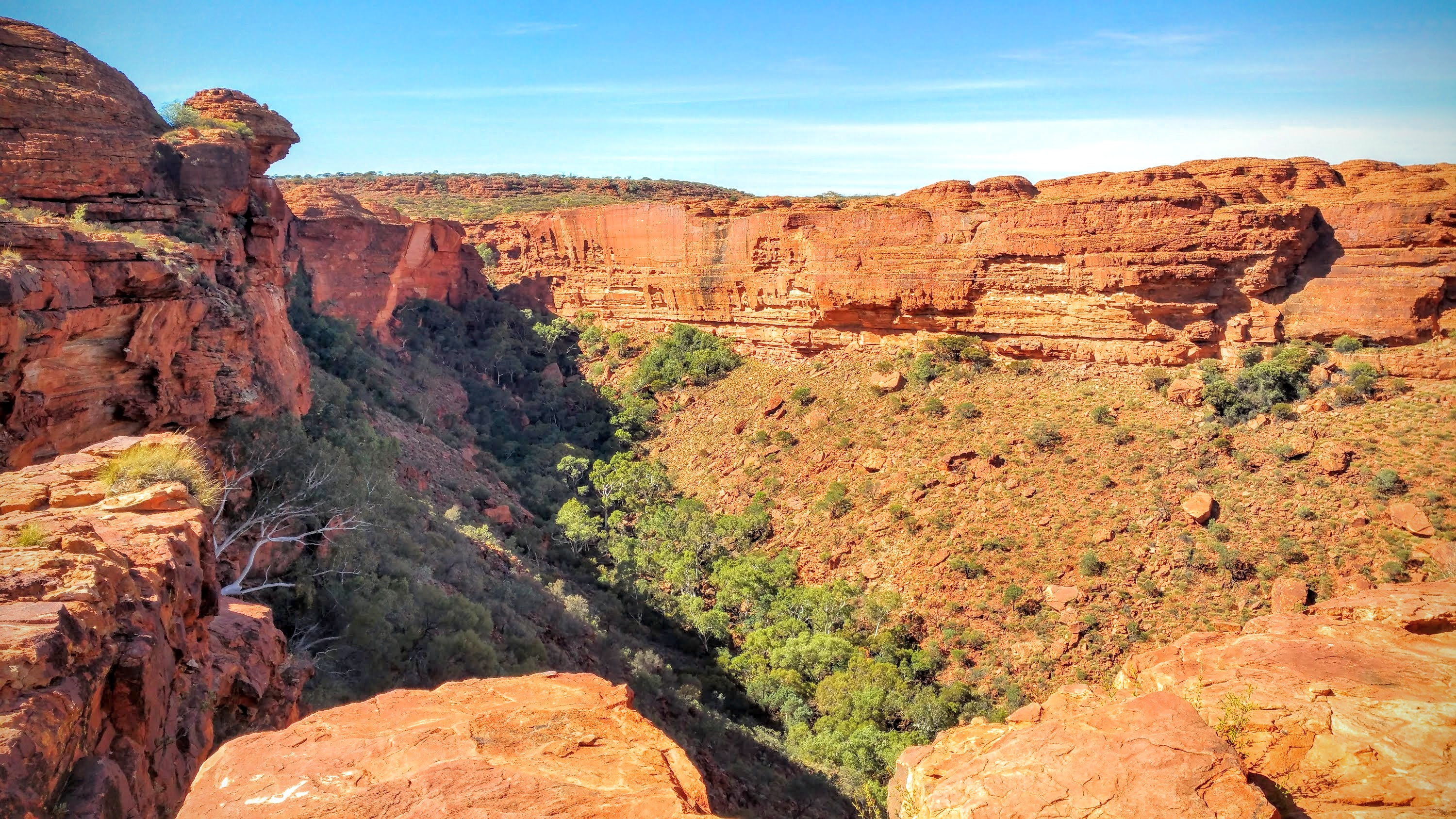
View over the canyon from the top of the rim

In 1986, Kings Canyon was listed on the Register of the National Estate, when it was described by the Department of Environment as follows:

One of the most spectacular canyons in Central Australia. Kings Canyon contains some 60 rare or relict plant species and a total of 572 different plant species and 80 species of birds. It is a 'living plant museum' and is notable for its stands of cycads & permanent rock pools. There are some well-preserved Aboriginal paintings and engravings in the area...

The walls of Kings Canyon are over 100 m (330 ft) high, with Kings Creek at the bottom, and several Aboriginal sacred sites. Part of the gorge is an Aboriginal sacred site. The Garden of Eden is a permanent waterhole surrounded by plant life. While visitors are permitted on the walking track, the waterhole is an important men's sacred place for the traditional owners, with particular Dreaming stories associated with it, so visitors are not allowed to swim in it. There are some distinctive rock formations known as the "Lost City".

=== Walks ===
There are four short walks for visitors:

- The 6-kilometre (3.7 mi) (loop) Kings Canyon Rim Walk traces the top of the canyon and takes three to four hours to complete. It is graded "Grade 4 - moderate to difficult".
- The 2.6-kilometre (1.6 mi) (return) and approximately one-hour Kings Creek Walk traces the bottom of the gorge. (Grade 2 - easy)
- The 4.8-kilometre (3.0 mi) South Wall return takes around two hours to complete. A steep climb at the beginning of the walk takes visitors up to the top, with views of the gorge below. It ends at a one-way gate. Grade 3 - moderate.
- Kathleen Springs is an easy walk on a sealed track and suitable for wheelchairs. At around 2.4 kilometres (1.5 mi), allow around 1.5 hours for the return trip.

The 22-kilometre (14 mi) Giles Track connects Kings Canyon to Kathleen Springs and can be followed in either direction. It is advised to spend a night on the track.

== Geology ==
According to geologists, the valley was formed more than 400 million years ago. It cuts through a layer of Mereenie Sandstone, which was deposited here 400 million years ago. The sandstone can be viewed in the form of 30-m-high cliffs, and as you go deeper, you can witness the softer Carmichael Sandstone, which has been present here for 440 million years. These two layers of sandstone are divided by a thin layer of purple shale or mudstone which depicts the environmental changes between the two formations.

== Flora and fauna ==
Birds in the canyon area include the spinifex pigeon, zebra finch, several species of honeyeater, purple-backed fairywren, budgerigar, rufous grasswren, nankeen kestrel, and many more.

Other animals include:

- Blistered pyrgomorph
- Centralian Green Frog
- Desert tree frog
- Dingo
- Long-nosed dragon
- Perentie
- Ring-tailed dragon
- Termites
- Rock wallaby

More than 750 plant species have been recorded in the area, with at least 60 of them unique to the region. They include rare cycads, ferns, eucalyptus, acacia, and desert oaks.

== Kings Creek Station ==
Kings Creek Station was established by Ian and Lyn Conway in 1981. It lies 36 km (22 mi) from Kings Canyon and offers accommodation and tourist experiences. It was originally run as a cattle station and camel property, and still runs these animals, but tourism is now its main business. The property covers 2,200 km^{2} (850 sq mi), of which 100 km^{2} (39 sq mi) is freehold, with the remainder being a pastoral lease. Tony McFadzean took over as CEO and co-owner some time after the Conways retired in April 2019.

== Power station ==
Kings Canyon Power Station is a photovoltaic power station. It has a generating capacity of 225 kWp and electricity production of 372,000 kWh per annum. It was the largest single installation of its kind in Australia when it began operation in December 2003. Kings Canyon Power Station, part of the Territory Generation network, is the only commercial source of electricity in the Kings Canyon area. It provides up to 1.1MW from a combination of solar and diesel generation.

== In popular culture ==
Kings Canyon featured in the 1994 film The Adventures of Priscilla, Queen of the Desert as the rock climbed by the lead characters at the end of their trip of self-discovery.
