= Birdum =

Birdum may refer to:

- Birdum (biogeographic subregion) - refer Interim Biogeographic Regionalisation for Australia
- Birdum, Northern Territory, a locality and former town
- Birdum Airfield, a former airfield – see List of Royal Australian Air Force installations
- Birdum Historic Site, the site of the former Town of Birdum, now in the locality of Larrimah, Northern Territory
