= Gorrie Airfield =

- Elsey, Northern Territory, Australia

Site information
- Type: Military Airfield

Location
- Coordinates: 15°29′13.52″S 133°10′48.84″E

Site history
- In use: 1943–1945

Gorrie Airfield was a Royal Australian Air Force (RAAF) airfield in the Northern Territory of Australia during World War II located about 10 km (6.2 mi) north of Larrimah and about 67 km (42 mi) south of Mataranka in what is now the locality of Elsey.

The airfield was named after Flying Officer Peter Gorrie who was killed in action on 12 January 1942 during an attack against enemy shipping at Menado.

The establishment at Gorrie comprised over 6,000 RAAF personnel responsible for aircraft and vehicle maintenance for the RAAF and United States Army Air Forces. A large petrol storage and bomb dump were constructed as part of the airfield. The remains of the runway and many of the buildings and structures are still visible.

Part of the airfield covering an area of 10.46 hectares (25.8 acres) was listed on the Northern Territory Heritage Register on 28 July 2010 under the name, "WWII Gorrie Airfield Precinct".

== Units based at Gorrie Airfield ==
- No. 9 Stores Depot (RAAF)
- No. 14 Aircraft Repair Depot (RAAF)
- No. 18 Replenishing Centre (RAAF)
- No. 55 Operational Base Unit (RAAF)

== See also ==
- List of airports in the Northern Territory
