= Elsey, Northern Territory =

Elsey Northern Territory
- Coordinates: 15°07′52″S 133°13′58″E
- Population: 39 (2016 census)
  - Density: 0.00462/km^{2} (0.01196/sq mi)
- Established: 4 April 2007
- Postcode(s): 0852
- Area: 8,447 km^{2} (3,261.4 sq mi)
- Time zone: ACST (UTC+9:30)
- Location: 349 km (217 mi) SE of Darwin City
- LGA(s): Roper Gulf Region
- Territory electorate(s): Barkly
- Federal division(s): Lingiari
Mean max temp	Mean min temp	Annual rainfall
33.9 °C; 93 °F	19.6 °C; 67 °F	859.5 mm 33.8 in
Suburbs around Elsey:
Venn; Manbulloo	Venn; Beswick Creek; Flying Fox	Flying Fox
Manbulloo; Sturt Plateau	Elsey	Flying Fox; Limmen
Sturt Plateau	Sturt Plateau; Larrimah; Birdum	Limmen
- Footnotes: Locations; Adjoining localities (Note: The locality of Elsey fully surrounds both the community of Jilkminggan and the locality of Mataranka.)

Elsey is a locality in the Northern Territory of Australia located about 349 kilometres (217 mi) south-east of the territory capital of Darwin.

The locality’s name derived from the Elsey Creek whose watercourse is located within the locality and which was named by the explorer, Augustus Charles Gregory. The name is ultimately derived from John Ravenscroft Elsey, a surgeon and naturalist, who was a member of Gregory’s expedition to Northern Australia during 1856. The locality of Elsey fully surrounds both the community of Jilkminggan and the locality of Mataranka. Its boundaries and name were gazetted on 4 April 2007.

Elsey includes the following places listed on the Northern Territory Heritage Register:

- Elsey Memorial Cemetery
- WWII Gorrie Airfield Precinct
- Warloch Ponds Railway Bridge
- Warloch Ponds Road Bridge

The 2016 Australian census which was conducted in August 2016 reports that Elsey had 39 people living within its boundaries.

Elsey is located within the federal division of Lingiari, the territory electoral division of Barkly and the local government area of the Roper Gulf Region.
