= No. 1 Medical Receiving Station RAAF =

No. 1 Medical Receiving Station (1MRS) was a Royal Australian Air Force (RAAF) field hospital unit during World War II.

== History ==
1MRS was formed at Daly Waters, Northern Territory, on 23 March 1942. The field hospital was constructed near 5 Mile Water Hole.

On 14 September 1942 the unit moved to a field hospital at Coomalie Creek. The first such hospital to be established and operated by an American unit in the South West Pacific Area, it had been constructed by elements of the 135th Medical Regiment of the U.S. Army, which had recently moved to Birdum.

During an air raid at around midnight on 13 August 1943, Japanese planes dropped 26 bombs within the hospital grounds, however there were no casualties at 1MRS.

1MRS was disbanded on 6 April 1946.
