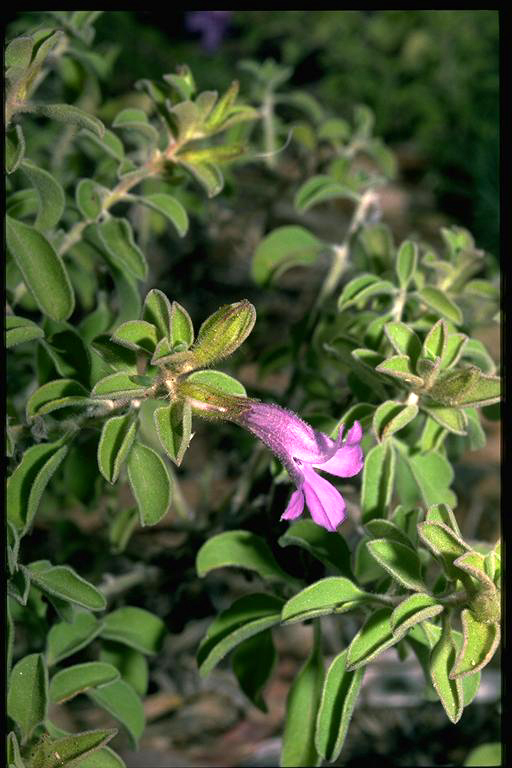

Scientific classification
- Kingdom: Plantae
- Clade: Tracheophytes
- Clade: Angiosperms
- Clade: Eudicots
- Clade: Asterids
- Order: Lamiales
- Family: Scrophulariaceae
- Genus: Eremophila
- Species: E. ovata

Binomial name
- Eremophila ovata Chinnock

= Eremophila ovata =

Species of flowering plant

Eremophila ovata is a flowering plant in the figwort family, Scrophulariaceae and is endemic to the Northern Territory. It is a small, spreading, rounded shrub with hairy branches and leaves and pink or purple flowers which are white inside.

== Description ==
Eremophila ovata is a rounded shrub which grows to a height of 0.25–1.0 m (10–40 in) and a width of about 1 m (40 in). Its branches are densely covered with simple, branched and white or yellow glandular hairs. The leaves are arranged alternately along the branches and are mostly 10–25 mm (0.4–1 in) long, 9–14 mm (0.4–0.6 in) wide, not including the leaf stalk which is a further 3.5–7 mm (0.1–0.3 in) long. The leaves are elliptic to egg-shaped, sometimes almost circular and covered with hairs, more densely on the lower surface. Sometimes both surfaces eventually become glabrous.

The flowers are borne singly in leaf axils on a stalk less than 2 mm (0.08 in) long. There are 5 green, hairy, lance-shaped or triangular sepals which are mostly 8.5–10.5 mm (0.3–0.4 in) long. The petals are 18–30 mm (0.7–1 in) long and joined at their lower end to form a tube. The petal tube is lilac-coloured or purple on the outside and white with lilac spots inside. The outside of the petal tube and the lobes are hairy but the inside surface of the lobes is glabrous and the inside of the tube is filled with woolly hairs. The 4 stamens are fully enclosed in the petal tube. Flowering occurs mainly from winter to spring and is followed by fruits which are oval-shaped, 4.5–7 mm (0.2–0.3 in) long and hairy.

== Taxonomy and naming ==
The species was first formally described in 1979 by Robert Chinnock and the description was published in Journal of the Adelaide Botanic Garden. The specific epithet (ovata) is a Latin word meaning "egg-shaped", referring to the shape of the leaves.

== Distribution and habitat ==
Eremophila ovata only occurs in the George Gill and Gardiner Ranges in the Northern Territory where it grows in gravelly soils on slopes and in gullies.

== Conservation ==
This species is classified as "of least concern" by the Northern Territory Government Department of Land Resource Management.

== Use in horticulture ==
This small eremophila is fast-growing but short-lived. It flowers over a long period and is known to sucker. Propagation is easy from cuttings but grafting onto Myoporum rootstock will prevent the development of suckers. It grows best in well-drained soil in full sun or partial shade and is very drought and frost tolerant but does not thrive in areas with high humidity.
