= Luritja Road =

Designated state route in the Northern Territory of Australia

Luritja Road Northern Territory
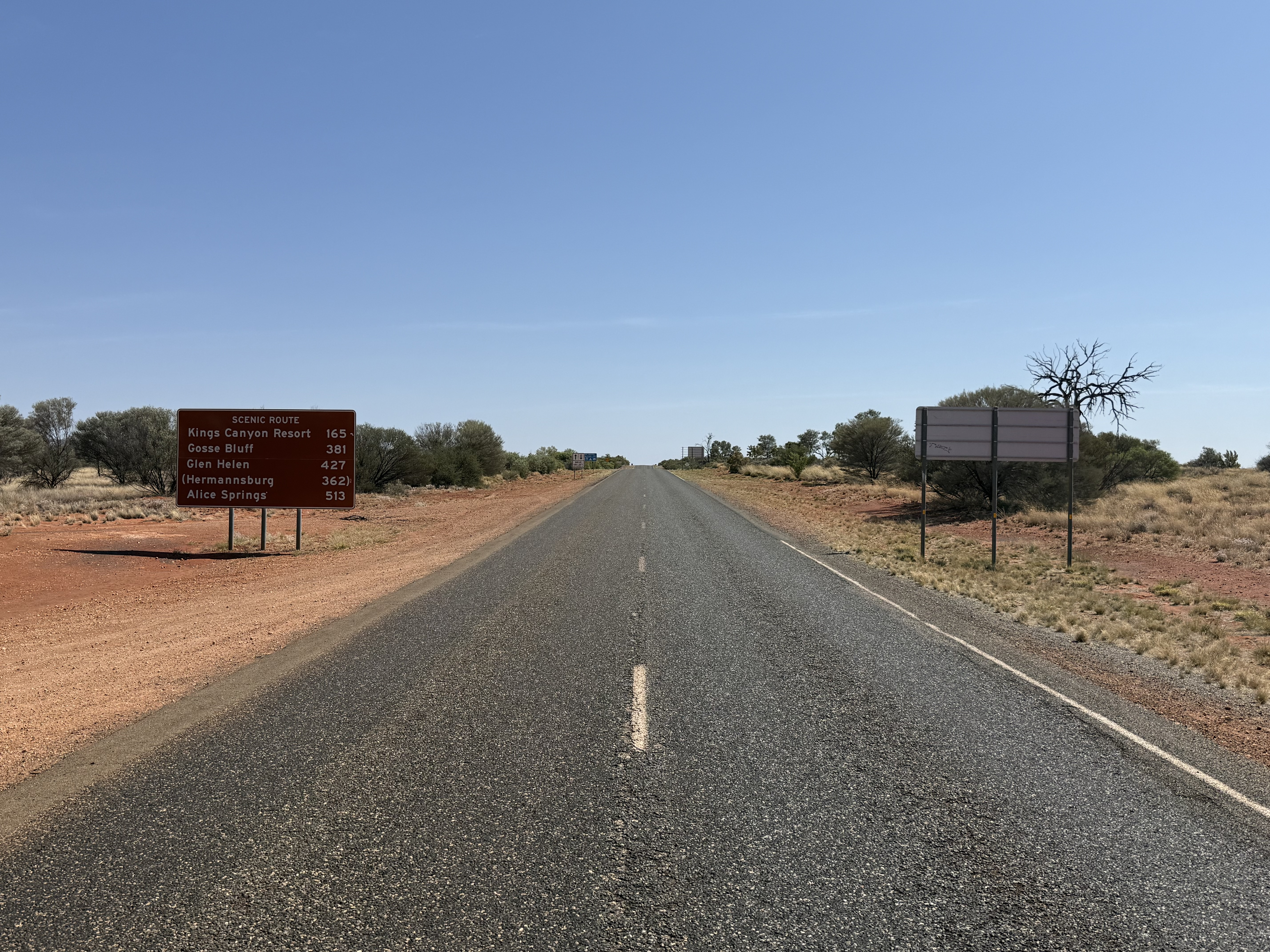
- Luritja Road, looking north near the T intersection with Lasseter Highway

General information
- Type: Road
- Length: 147 km (91 mi)
- Route number(s): State Route 3

Major junctions
- Larapinta Drive (State Route 6), Watarrka National Park
- Lasseter Highway (State Route 4), northeast of Curtin Springs

Luritja Road is a designated state route in the Northern Territory of Australia. Strictly touristic, it runs through the Watarrka National Park. It is part of the Red Centre Way and connects Larapinta Drive with the Lasseter Highway. The road is named after the Aboriginal Luritja tribe.
