= Roper Gulf Region =

Coordinates: 14.4670°S 132.2670°E

Roper Gulf Regional Council
- Local government area
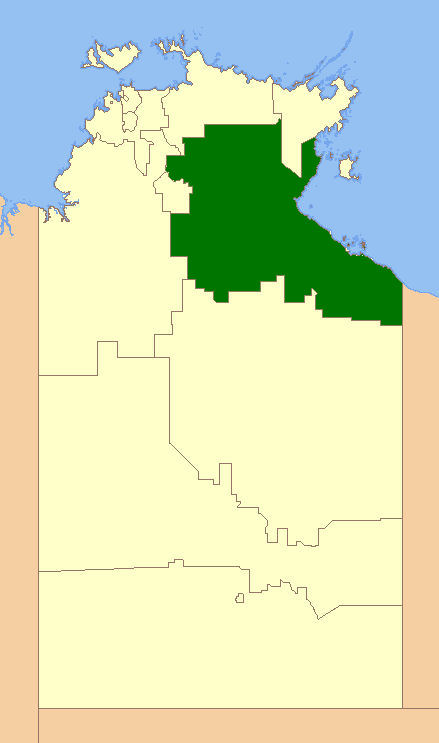

- Interactive map of Roper Gulf Regional Council
- Country: Australia
- State: Northern Territory
- Region: Katherine Region
- Established: 2008
- Council seat: Katherine (outside LGA)

Government
  - Mayor: Tony Jack
  - Territory electorate: Arnhem, Barkly
  - Federal division: Lingiari

Area
  - Total: 185,210 km^{2} (71,510 sq mi)

Population
  - Total: 7,397 (2018)
  - Density: 0.039938/km^{2} (0.103440/sq mi)
- Website: Roper Gulf Regional Council
LGAs around Roper Gulf Regional Council
West Arnhem	West Arnhem	East Arnhem
Victoria Daly	Roper Gulf Regional Council	Groote Archipelago Region
Victoria Daly	Barkly	Burke (QLD)

Roper Gulf Regional Council is a local government area of the Northern Territory, Australia. The region covers an area of 185,210 square kilometres (71,510 sq mi) and had a population of 7,397 in June 2018.

== History ==
In October 2006 the Northern Territory Government announced the reform of local government areas. The intention of the reform was to improve and expand the delivery of services to towns and communities across the Northern Territory by establishing eleven new shires. The Roper-Gulf Shire was created on 1 July 2008 as were the remaining ten shires. On 1 January 2014, the Shire was renamed to Roper Gulf Regional Council.

Elections for the Councillors in the Region were held on 25 October 2008.

Most of the area of the Council was previously unincorporated, but it absorbed several small LGAs on incorporation:

- Borroloola Community
- Numbulwar Numburindi Community
- Nyirranggulung Mardrulk Ngadberre Regional Council
- Yugul Mangi Community
- Mataranka Community
- Jilkminggan Community
- Jodetluk Community

== Wards ==
The Roper Gulf Regional Council is divided into 5 wards, which is governed by 13 Councillors across four wards:

- Never Never Ward (3)
- Numbulwar Numburindi Ward (2)
- Nyirranggulung Ward (3)
- South West Gulf Ward (3)
- Yugul Mangi Ward (2)

== Localities and communities ==
Land within the Roper Gulf Shire was divided in 2007 into bounded areas for the purpose of creating an address for a property. Most bounded areas are called "localities" while those associated with aboriginal communities are called "communities".

=== Localities ===
- Arnold
- Barunga
- Birdum
- Borroloola
- Calvert
- Daly Waters
- Elsey
- Flying Fox
- Gulung Mardrulk
- Larrimah
- Limmen
- Mcarthur
- Nitmiluk
- Numburindi
- Pellew Islands
- Sturt Plateau
- Mataranka
- Wilton

=== Communities ===
- Barunga
- Beswick
- Bulman Weemol
- Jilkminggan
- Miniyerri
- Ngukurr
- Numbulwar
- Robinson River
