= Larapinta Drive =

Road in the Northern Territory, Australia

Larapinta Drive Northern Territory
- Larapinta Drive (green)

General information
- Type: Road
- Length: 325 km (202 mi)
- Opened: 1962
- Route number(s): B6

Major junctions
- East end: Stuart Highway (A7), Alice Springs
- Namatjira Drive (State Route 2)
- West end: Luritja Road (A3), Petermann, Northern Territory

Location(s)
- Major suburbs: Hermannsburg

Larapinta Drive is a designated state route in the Northern Territory of Australia.

It runs in a westerly direction from Alice Springs to the community of Hermannsburg and then continues to Kings Canyon in the Watarrka National Park. After Kings Canyon, the road continues to the south to the Lasseter Highway as the Luritja Road. Its route includes a number of tourist attractions such as the Alice Springs Desert Park, West MacDonnell National Park, monuments dedicated to Aboriginal artist Albert Namatjira and Royal Flying Doctor Service founder John Flynn, as well as Albert Namatjira's house near Hermannsburg.

Larapinta is the local Arrernte name for the Finke River a major watercourse in the area. The length of Larapinta Drive is marketed as part of the "Red Centre Way" tourist drive.

With the adoption of a state route numbering system of rural roads maintained by the Northern Territory Government in 1987, state route designations and signage were applied to Larapinta Drive as State route 6.

Road conditions on the route are varied. Travelling west from the Stuart Highway the road is a divided dual carriageway for approximately 1 km (0.6 mi), crossing the Adelaide-Darwin Railway at grade and forming the boundary of the suburb of Gillen and industrial area of Ciccone The road continues as a single carriageway beyond this point except for a short section of approximately 600 m (2,000 ft) in the suburb of Araluen. Beyond Alice Springs, Larapinta Drive is sealed as far as Hermannsburg. (Sealed as far as Namatjira drive turn off.) West of Namatjira drive turn off, the road conditions are suitable to four-wheel drive vehicles as it is a dirt track and it is advisable to check road conditions before travel. This section is also known as the Mereenie Loop Road, and permits are required to enter traditional lands when travelling this route.

== Significant junctions ==
Location	km	mi	Destinations	Notes
Alice Springs	0	0.0	Stuart Highway (A87)	
Hugh	46	29	Namatjira Drive (State route 2) – Glen Helen	
Hermannsburg	126	78	Finke River	
Namatjira	168	104	Namatjira Drive (State route 2) – Glen Helen	
Petermann	325	202	Luritja Road (A3)	
1.000 mi = 1.609 km; 1.000 km = 0.621 mi
