= Namatjira Drive =

State route in the Northern Territory, Australia

Namatjira Drive Northern Territory
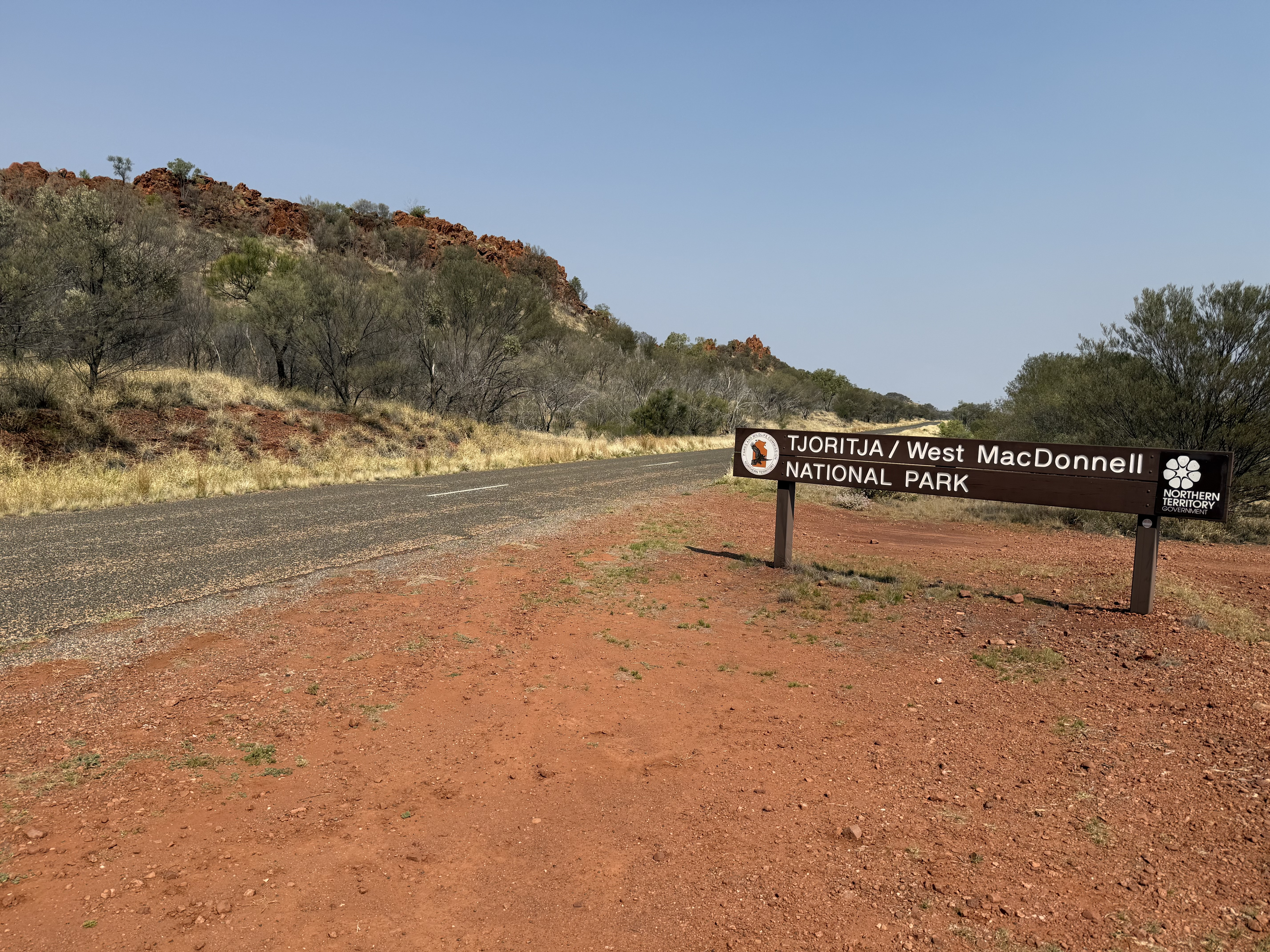
- West MacDonnell National Park sign on Namatjira Drive, October 2025

General information
- Type: Road
- Length: 157 km (98 mi)
- Route number(s): State Route 2

Major junctions
- / Larapinta Drive (State Route 2 and 6), west of Alice Springs
- Larapinta Drive (State Route 6), west of Hermannsburg

Namatjira Drive is a designated state route in the Northern Territory of Australia. Strictly touristic, it runs through West MacDonnell National Park. Like Larapinta Drive, from which it branches off, it is part of the Red Centre Way. Namatjira Drive is named after Albert Namatjira (1902–1959), one of the most famous Aboriginal painters, who was born in Hermannsburg.
