= Jilkminggan, Northern Territory =

Community in Northern Territory, Australia

Jilkminggan Northern Territory
- Coordinates: 14°57′15″S 133°18′04″E
- Population: 263 (2021)
- Postcode(s): 0852
- Location: 146 km (91 mi) SE of Katherine; 193 km (120 mi) N of Daly Waters
- LGA(s): Roper Gulf Region
- Territory electorate(s): Arnhem
- Federal division(s): Lingiari

Jilkminggan is a small community in the Northern Territory of Australia. It is located 146 kilometres (91 mi) south-east of Katherine and 193 kilometres (120 mi) north of Daly Waters.

The community has had books published about local stories.
