= George Gill Range =

Mountain range in Northern Territory, Australia

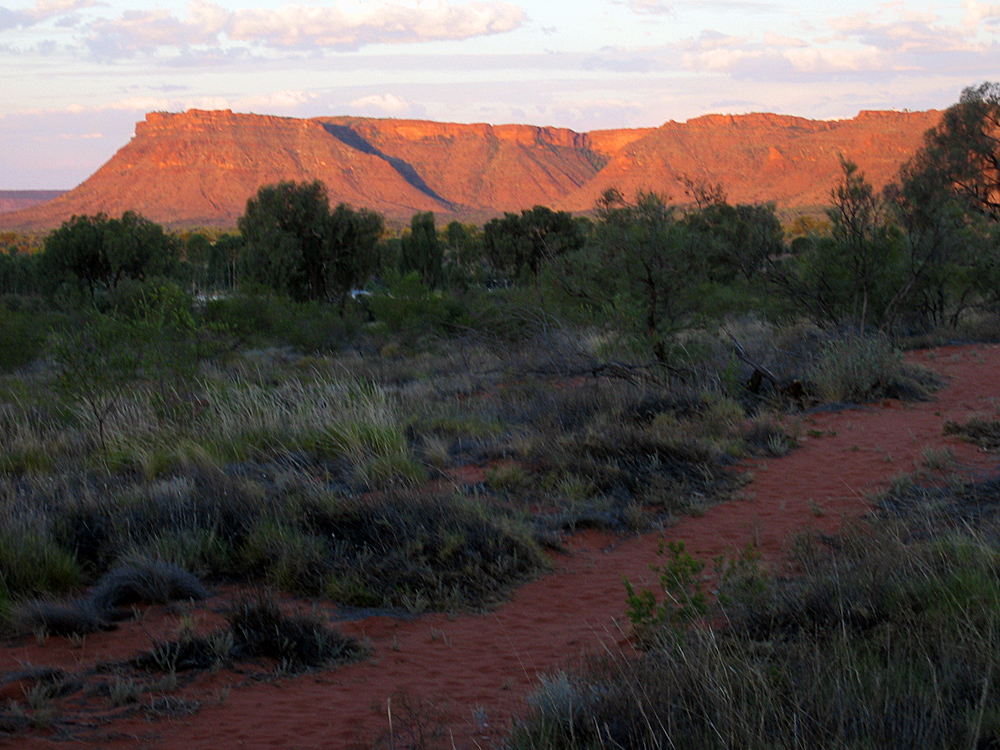

Highest point
- Elevation: 693 m (2,274 ft)

Geography
- Location within Northern Territory
- Country: Australia
- State: Northern Territory
- Range coordinates: 24°17′S 131°35′E

George Gill Range is a mountain range in the southern part of Australia's Northern Territory, 215 km (134 mi) southwest of Alice Springs. It is an extension of the MacDonnell Ranges and consists mainly of sandstone.

In the southern part of the range there are some springs and water holes. Among other things, the Kings Creek flows here, which at the western end created the Kings Canyon over millions of years. This canyon offers over 100 meter high rock walls in various colors, a permanently water-bearing billabong with lush vegetation and is surrounded by a plateau with spectacular stone formations. This natural beauty makes it one of the main tourist attractions in the region. About 36% of the range is located in Watarrka National Park.

The first European to visit the area was Ernest Giles in 1872. He named it after his brother-in-law, George Gill, who had helped him fund the expedition.
