= Larrimah =

- Town
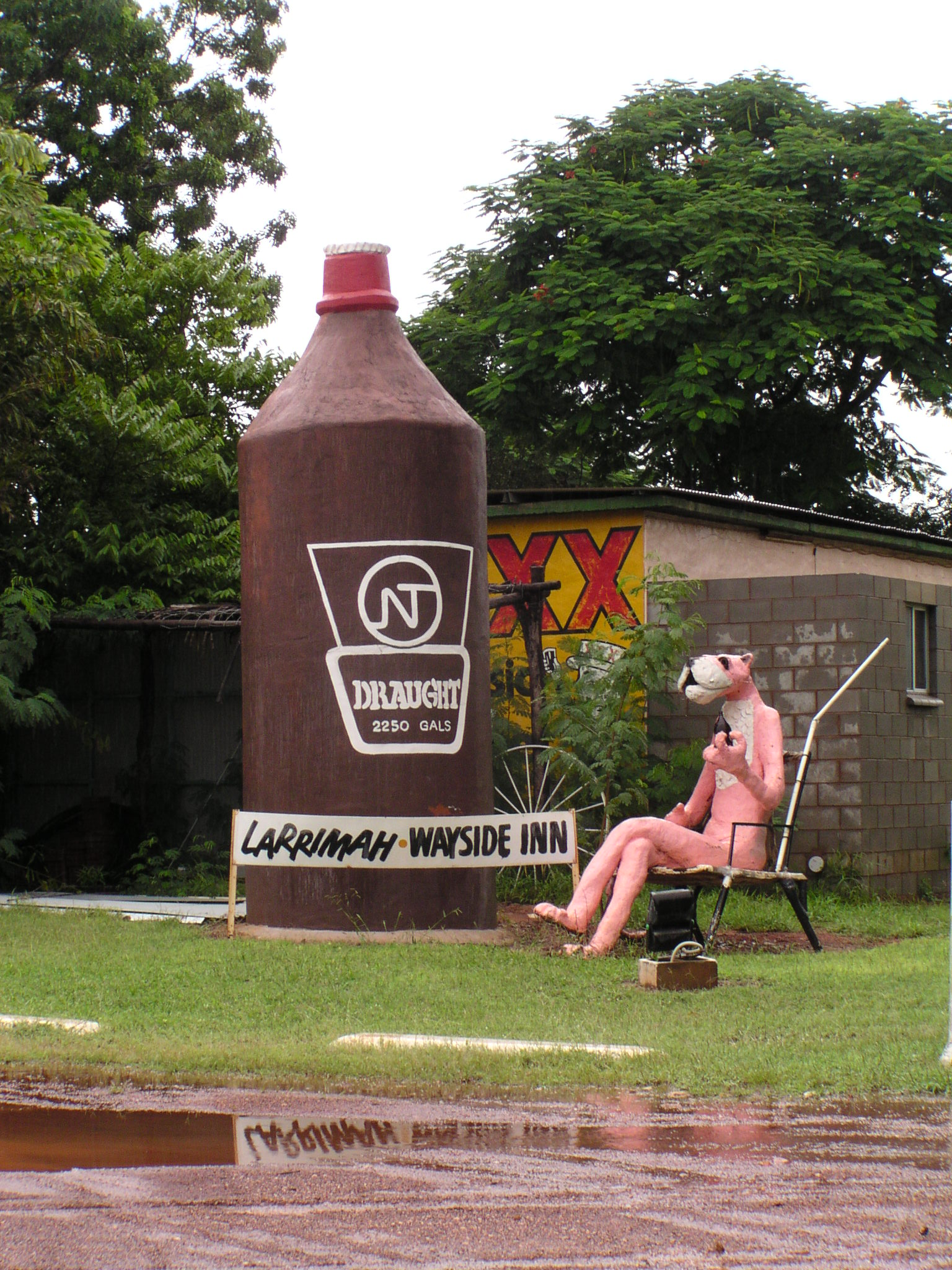
- The Big Stubby located outside Larrimah Hotel

- Coordinates: 15°34′33″S 133°12′59″E
- Country: Australia
- State: Northern Territory
- LGA: Roper Gulf Region
- Location: 431 km (268 mi) SE of Darwin; 158 km (98 mi) SE of Katherine; 93 km (58 mi) N of Daly Waters
- Established: March 1941 (village); 29 June 1950 (town); 3 April 2007 (locality)

Government
  - Territory electorate: Barkly
  - Federal division: Lingiari
- Elevation: 187 m (614 ft)

Population
  - Total: 47 (2016 census)
- Time zone: UTC+9:30 (ACST)
- Postcode: 0852
- Mean max temp: 33.9 °C (93.0 °F)
- Mean min temp: 19.6 °C (67.3 °F)
- Annual rainfall: 859.6 mm (33.84 in)
Localities around Larrimah
Elsey	Elsey	Birdum
Sturt Plateau; Birdum	Larrimah	Birdum
Birdum	Birdum	Birdum
- Locations; Adjoining localities

Larrimah is a remote town and locality in the Northern Territory of Australia, approximately 431 kilometres (268 mi) southeast of the territorial capital of Darwin and 158 kilometres (98 mi) southeast of the municipal seat of Katherine. It is on the Stuart Highway. It was established during the Second World War as the railhead of the North Australia Railway and a significant site for troop movements and military supplies.

== Demographics ==
In the 2016 Australian census, Larrimah had a population of 47 people. By 2021, the census reported a population of 27 people: 64% male and 36% female, with a median age of 37 years. Other reports stated that the population dipped below 12, and when a baby was born in 2022 this was reported both to have increased the population and reduced the average age by approximately ten percent. Recent reports state (2023), a current population of 10. There are 18 private dwellings, with an average of 2.1 people per household and a median weekly income of $1874.

== History ==
=== Pre-1940 ===
The Yangman people occupied the surrounding area for over 40,000 years. They believe the Dreaming tracks of the Storm Bird (channel-billed cuckoo) created the landscape of Larrimah. The name "Larrimah" means "meeting place" in the Yangman language.

John McDouall Stuart explored the Larrimah area in the 1860s on his transcontinental journey from Flinders Range but did not settle or establish a town. The North Australia Railway, a 234 km long gauge railway from Darwin to Birdum, Northern Territory, was officially opened in October 1889.

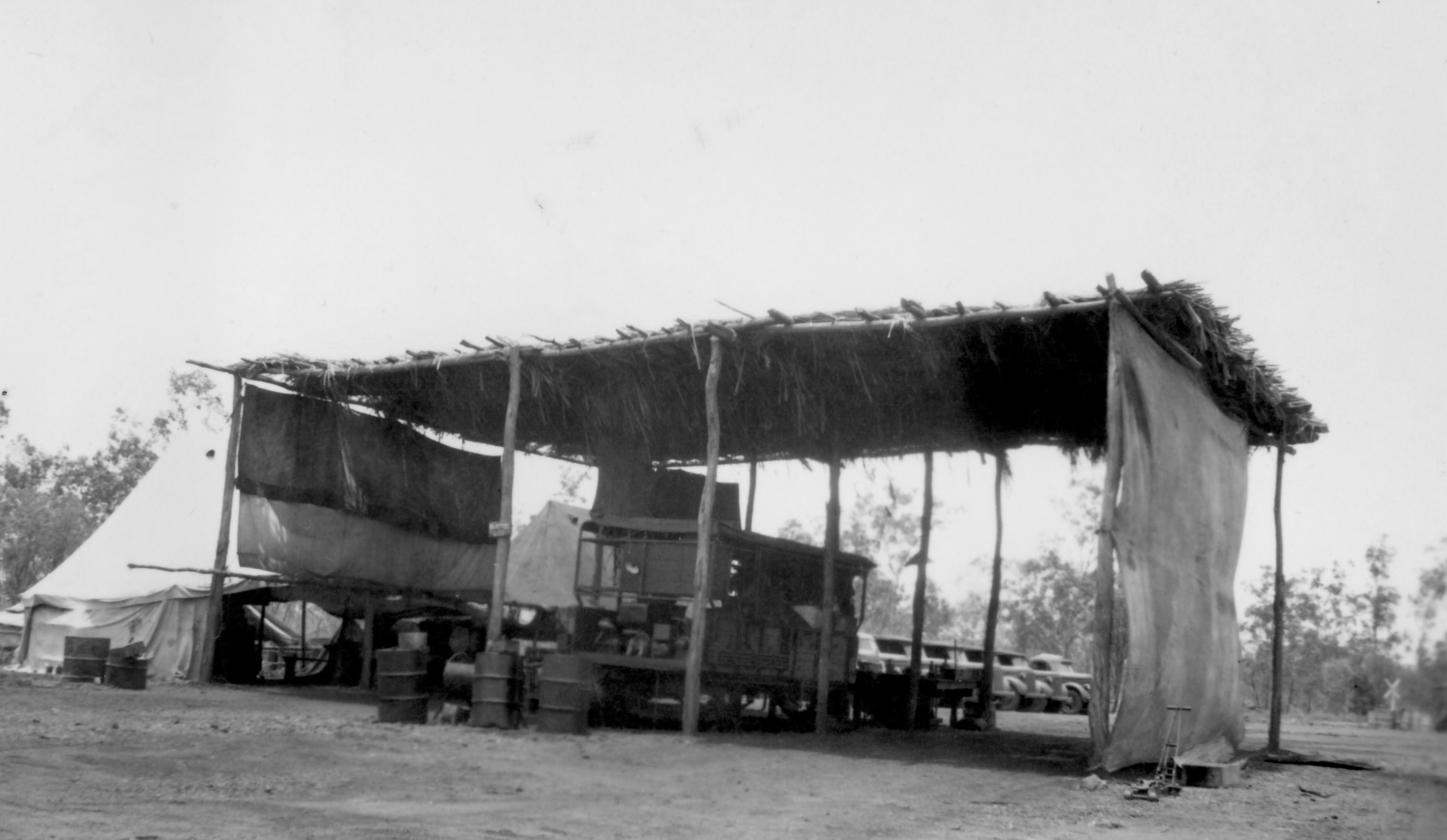
A workshop constructed at Larrimah during World War II, c. 1940s

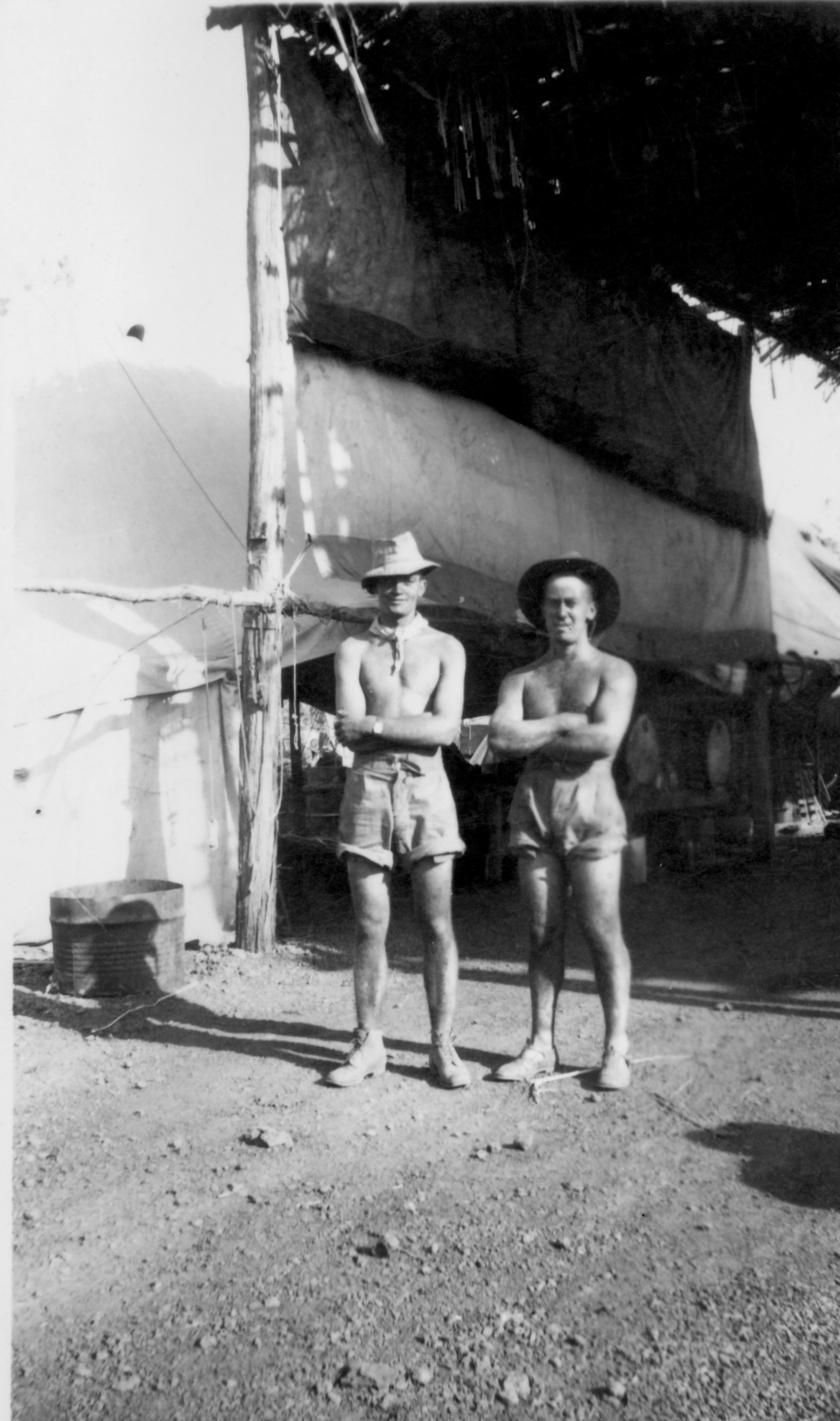
Two Army servicemen in Larrimah during World War II, c. 1940s

=== Establishment and World War II ===
Larrimah was officially established in 1940 as the rail terminus of the North Australia Railway from Darwin. It became the site of an army transit camp. The railway transported troops and materials to and from the northern Australia war zone and was a vital link with Darwin for those living in remote communities as communication between Birdum and Alice Springs was otherwise only available via the Stuart Highway. Larrimah became a military town and the transfer point for army personnel and supplies. In 1942, a repeater station was built from two Sydney Williams huts to provide direct communications with other sites including Tennant Creek and Newcastle Waters.

Gorrie Airfield was established at the end of the North Australia Railway line, 10 km from the Larrimah town centre. The airstrip was named after F/OP Peter C Gorrie who was killed in action on 12 January 1942 in the Dutch East Indies. During World War II, it was a base for Royal Australian Air Force and United States Air Force personnel and it was the largest army base in Australia. During 1943, it was home to 6,500 military recruits, making it one of the largest military bases in the Pacific Region during World War II. A large bomb dump, petrol storage and other bulk supply storage was constructed in the area for the warehousing of stores prior to issue to other units. All personnel left Gorrie Airfield for Darwin during October 1945 after peace was declared on 15 August 1945. All remaining machinery and equipment was sent to RAAF Base Pearce.

Darwin was bombed on 19 February 1942 by 175 Japanese planes, prompting fears of a Japanese invasion of Australia. By March of that year, demand for manpower to meet the invasion threat became significant. To meet this demand, the army relaxed its attitude to the enlistment of Aboriginal people and large numbers of Aboriginal people enlisted.

The Northern Territory employed more Aboriginal army labourers than other establishments. By 1944, the army employed one-fifth of Aboriginal people in the Northern Territory. In May 1943, Larrimah employed 497 Aboriginal men and 33 women. Men carried out semi-skilled work including slaughtering, timber cutting and cleaning. Women performed maintenance tasks and were employed in hospitals, similar to work performed by the Australian Women's Army Service.

These "special settlements" established from Larrimah to Darwin became meeting grounds for Aboriginal people from Alice Springs, Victoria River and the Arnhem Land. The diverse groups of Aboriginal people shared work and duties with each other and played cards together, emphasising their status as part of the wider army system.

=== Post-war ===
In the 1960s and 1970s, the railway was important for transporting iron ore from Frances Creek Deposits. At its peak, one million tonnes per annum were transported. When global prices dropped, the mine closed and traffic from other industries could not financially keep the line open. The railway officially ceased all operations and closed in February 1981.

== Heritage ==
The following places in Larrimah are listed on the Northern Territory Heritage Register:

=== Birdum Historic Township ===
A small township established in 1929 at the terminus of the North Australia Railway, it had a Hotel, post office, railway infrastructure and a number of shops. The township was the southernmost point reached by the railway and became an important transport hub for Territory road, rail and air transport in the 1930s. It was the only location to serve all three functions. It was briefly the headquarters location for the American Air Force, before moving closer to Larrimah.

Structural remains at the site show the lives of a small community pre- and post-World War II, and has social associations with both American and Australian forces during the war.

=== World War II Larrimah Telephone Repeater Station and Powerhouse ===
Built in 1941 and 1942, the Telephone Repeater Station and Powerhouse, relocated in 1946, were a result of the military's urgent upgrading of the Morse Code overland telegraph line to a direct voice system. When established, the Repeater Station had a state of the art long line repeater system, consisting of four voice frequency and carrier channels. This technology became obsolete in the 1970s.

The Powerhouse provided operational electricity for the telecommunications system to keep bank batteries fully charged.

Both buildings represent a significant era when telecommunication was changing, and they demonstrate characteristics of military commissioned architecture.

== Disappearance of Paddy Moriarty ==
Paddy Moriarty was born on 30 March 1947 in Croom Hospital in Croom, a village in the middle of County Limerick in the south-west of Ireland. He was raised in Abbeyfeale, a small town in the west of County Limerick, very near the county boundary with County Kerry. His mother was Mary Teresa Moriarty (died 1995) from Dromtrasna O'Brien, a townland in the west of County Limerick that is located a few miles south-east of Abbeyfeale. Moriarty said that he had emigrated from Ireland to Australia on the TSS Fairstar at the age of 19, and that he later worked as a station hand, ringer and grader driver. He moved to Larrimah in 2005 and purchased an unused service station in 2010 for $30,000.

On 16 December 2017, Moriarty and his dog Kellie left The Pink Panther, Larrimah's local pub, and drove 800 metres home by quadbike. It is believed he arrived at home as his hat, wallet and keys were there and the dog's food was half-eaten. When Moriarty did not appear the next day, locals suspected something had happened but several days passed before he was reported as missing to the nearest police station, 70 km away. Despite extensive air and land searches, and a $250,000 reward for information, Moriarty and Kellie have not been found since.

On 7 April 2022, coroner Greg Cavanagh handed down inquest findings on Moriarty and his dog's suspected deaths. He concluded Moriarty was likely killed on 16 December 2017 but his cause of death could not be determined. Cavanagh established Moriarty was "killed in the context of and likely due to the ongoing feud he had with his nearest neighbours". Northern Territory Legislation did not allow Cavanagh to include a finding or comment that a person may be guilty but he said, "However, I will refer this investigation to the Commissioner of Police and the DPP."

Investigations into the suspected death of Moriarty continue, and the $250,000 reward for information remains open.

The Walkley Award winning Australian crime podcast Lost in Larrimah, released in April–May 2018, explored the mystery of Moriarty's disappearance, as well as the town's history, including feuds within the small community. The hosts, Kylie Stevenson and Caroline Graham, released the book Larrimah: A missing man, an eyeless croc and an outback town of 1̶2̶ 11 people who mostly hate each other in 2021, which covers the town's history and the disappearance of Moriarty. The disappearance was also the subject of a four-part Radio National series by ABC News called A Dog Act: Homicide on the Highway, released in December 2018, and a 2023 documentary film called Last Stop Larrimah. A 12-part television series released in 2024 called Population: 11, starring Ben Feldman, was loosely based on this incident.

== Climate ==
Climate data for Larrimah, elevation 180 m (590 ft), (1991–2012 normals, extremes 1965–2012)
Month	Jan	Feb	Mar	Apr	May	Jun	Jul	Aug	Sep	Oct	Nov	Dec	Year
Record high °C (°F)	42.2 (108.0)	42.8 (109.0)	41.0 (105.8)	38.4 (101.1)	36.9 (98.4)	36.6 (97.9)	35.5 (95.9)	37.7 (99.9)	39.9 (103.8)	43.0 (109.4)	43.5 (110.3)	43.5 (110.3)	43.5 (110.3)
Mean daily maximum °C (°F)	34.9 (94.8)	34.2 (93.6)	34.0 (93.2)	33.8 (92.8)	31.7 (89.1)	29.3 (84.7)	29.8 (85.6)	31.7 (89.1)	35.6 (96.1)	37.4 (99.3)	37.8 (100.0)	36.4 (97.5)	33.9 (93.0)
Mean daily minimum °C (°F)	24.0 (75.2)	23.7 (74.7)	22.4 (72.3)	19.9 (67.8)	16.0 (60.8)	12.8 (55.0)	12.4 (54.3)	13.5 (56.3)	18.8 (65.8)	22.4 (72.3)	24.2 (75.6)	24.4 (75.9)	19.5 (67.2)
Record low °C (°F)	16.8 (62.2)	16.5 (61.7)	13.3 (55.9)	8.3 (46.9)	4.5 (40.1)	1.0 (33.8)	0.6 (33.1)	3.2 (37.8)	6.9 (44.4)	10.7 (51.3)	14.1 (57.4)	16.8 (62.2)	0.6 (33.1)
Average rainfall mm (inches)	213.4 (8.40)	227.6 (8.96)	152.3 (6.00)	28.4 (1.12)	6.7 (0.26)	1.6 (0.06)	0.2 (0.01)	0.8 (0.03)	3.3 (0.13)	24.8 (0.98)	66.7 (2.63)	197.0 (7.76)	922.8 (36.34)
Average rainy days (≥ 1.0 mm)	13.7	12.7	9.1	2.1	0.6	0.2	0.1	0.1	0.4	2.2	5.5	10.4	57.1
Source: Australian Bureau of Meteorology
