= Cape Crawford =

Cape in the Northern Territory in Australia

Coordinates: 16°40′0.00″S 135°48′0.00″E

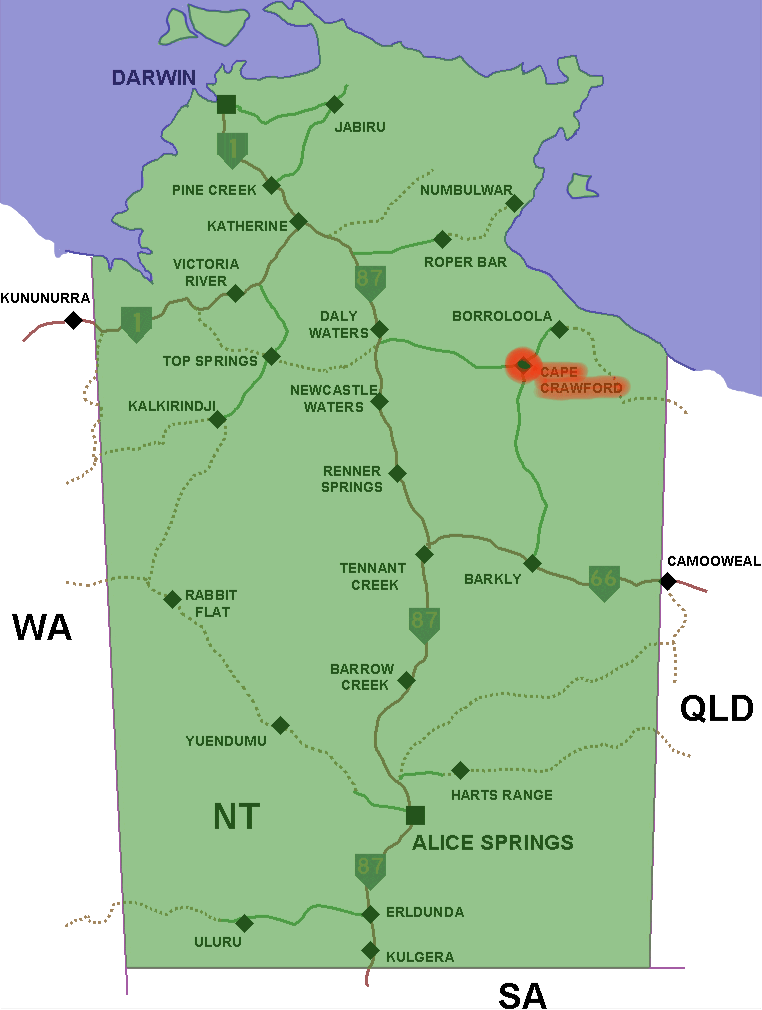
Location of Cape Crawford in Northern Territory (red)

Cape Crawford is a location in the Northern Territory in Australia. It is 100 kilometres south-west of Borroloola and is surrounded by savannah woodland, rock escarpments, waterfalls and waterholes. From here it is possible to organise a helicopter ride over the 'lost city' (large sandstone outcrops and formations formed 1.4 billion years ago) of the Limmen National Park. There is also an airport nearby called Cape Crawford Airport.

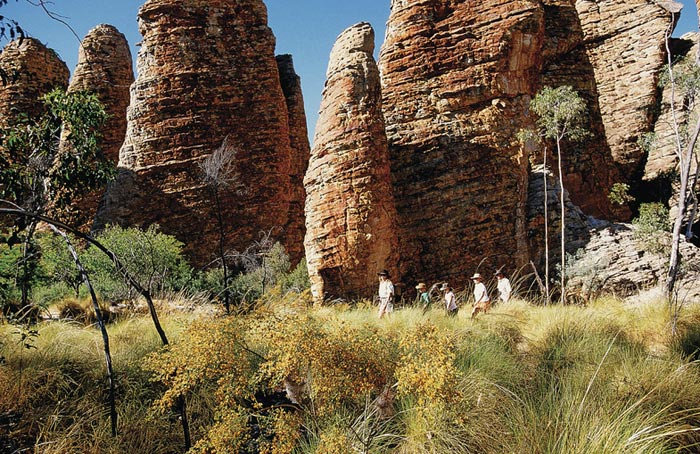
Lost City Cape Crawford

== See also ==
- Katherine, Northern Territory
- Borroloola
- Protected areas of the Northern Territory
