= Bulman, Northern Territory =

Bulman Northern Territory
- Coordinates: 13°39′50″S 134°20′0″E
- Population: 291 (2011 census)
- Postcode(s): 0852
- Location: 625 km (388 mi) SE of Darwin; 312 km (194 mi) NE of Katherine; 420 km (261 mi) SW of Nhulunbuy
- LGA(s): Roper Gulf Region
- Territory electorate(s): Arnhem
- Federal division(s): Lingiari

Bulman is a town in the Northern Territory of Australia. It is 400km (by air) from Darwin. Along with the Aboriginal community of Weemol, 5 km (3 mi) away, Bulman is considered a closed community meaning all visitors require a permit from the Northern Land Council to transit or visit the town. The combined population of Bulman and Weemol at the 2011 census was 291 and is one of few significant settlements on the Central Arnhem Road between Katherine and Nhulunbuy. Facilities in the town include a school, health clinic, police station and an all weather airstrip. Languages spoken in Bulman include Kriol, English and Rembarrnga.

Bulman is extremely isolated and during the wet season all access can be cut off, such as following Tropical Cyclone Paul in 2010, with the community having received 443 millimetres of rain in a 24-hour period, closing all roads out of town and the airport.

== Notable residents ==
Actor Chris Hemsworth, who was born in Melbourne, Victoria, Australia, lived both in that city and in Bulman. As he recalled, "My earliest memories were on the cattle stations up in the Outback, and then we moved back to Melbourne and then back out there and then back again. Certainly most of my childhood was in Melbourne but probably my most vivid memories were up there [in Bulman] with crocodiles and buffalo. Very different walks of life."

== Geobotanical/Geochemical Mapping ==
The limestone bedrock at Bulman hosts a small lead/zinc deposit. In 1962 Bulman and the Weemol Springs area was the scene of a pilot study to investigate the feasibility of using certain plants, as well as analysis of plant- and soil-samples, to map the extent and gauge of ore bodies in the region. The study included mapping of the vegetation assemblages in the area and their relation to the underlying soils. The study was published in the Transactions of the Institution of Mining and Metallurgy.

== Climate ==
Climate data for Bulman (2002–2024)
Month	Jan	Feb	Mar	Apr	May	Jun	Jul	Aug	Sep	Oct	Nov	Dec	Year
Record high °C (°F)	40.8 (105.4)	40.8 (105.4)	41.5 (106.7)	39.6 (103.3)	36.7 (98.1)	36.1 (97.0)	37.0 (98.6)	37.6 (99.7)	41.0 (105.8)	44.0 (111.2)	42.9 (109.2)	43.6 (110.5)	44.0 (111.2)
Mean daily maximum °C (°F)	35.1 (95.2)	34.8 (94.6)	34.7 (94.5)	34.3 (93.7)	32.6 (90.7)	30.6 (87.1)	31.1 (88.0)	32.9 (91.2)	36.2 (97.2)	38.4 (101.1)	38.8 (101.8)	37.3 (99.1)	34.7 (94.5)
Mean daily minimum °C (°F)	24.5 (76.1)	24.1 (75.4)	23.5 (74.3)	21.0 (69.8)	18.5 (65.3)	15.3 (59.5)	14.2 (57.6)	14.6 (58.3)	18.2 (64.8)	22.0 (71.6)	24.4 (75.9)	24.8 (76.6)	20.4 (68.7)
Record low °C (°F)	19.3 (66.7)	16.9 (62.4)	15.9 (60.6)	11.8 (53.2)	8.9 (48.0)	3.6 (38.5)	4.4 (39.9)	6.0 (42.8)	7.5 (45.5)	12.4 (54.3)	16.4 (61.5)	18.9 (66.0)	3.6 (38.5)
Average rainfall mm (inches)	236.9 (9.33)	220.1 (8.67)	223.3 (8.79)	60.1 (2.37)	14.6 (0.57)	1.2 (0.05)	1.0 (0.04)	0.7 (0.03)	12.8 (0.50)	19.0 (0.75)	60.1 (2.37)	192.7 (7.59)	1,042 (41.02)
Average rainy days (≥ 1.0 mm)	15	12.9	11.5	4.9	1.7	0.1	0.2	0.2	0.2	1.5	4.6	10.8	63.6
Source: Australian Bureau of Meteorology
