= Mataranka, Northern Territory =

Mataranka
- Town
- Coordinates: 14°57′18″S 133°03′04″E
- Country: Australia
- State: Northern Territory
- LGA: Roper Gulf Region
- Location: 431 km (268 mi) from Darwin; 114 km (71 mi) from Katherine
- Established: 24 May 1928 (town); 4 April 2007 (locality)

Government
  - Territory electorate: Barkly
  - Federal division: Lingiari

Population
  - Total: 350 (2016 census)
- Time zone: UTC+9:30 (ACST)
- Postcode: 0852
- Mean max temp: 33.9 °C (93.0 °F)
- Mean min temp: 19.6 °C (67.3 °F)
- Annual rainfall: 859.5 mm (33.84 in)
Localities around Mataranka
| Elsey | Elsey | Elsey |
| Elsey | Mataranka | Elsey |
| Elsey | Elsey | Elsey |

Mataranka is a town and locality in the Northern Territory of Australia located about 420 km (260 mi.) southeast of the territory capital of Darwin, and 107 km (66 mi.) south of Katherine. At the 2016 census, Mataranka recorded a population of 350. 29.5% of residents are Aboriginal and/or Torres Strait Islander.

The town is located near Roper River and Mataranka Hot Springs. This area is the setting for Jeannie Gunn's autobiographical account of the year 1902, We of the Never Never. The homestead, which she shared with her husband, Aeneas Gunn, until his death, has been reconstructed near to the hot springs.

The Mataranka Station is part of the Katherine Rural College of Charles Darwin University.

== History ==
=== Establishment ===
The name Mataranka means "home of the snake" in the Yangmanic language of the Aboriginal people who inhabit the area. The name was given to a sheep farm around 1915 by John A. Gilruth, who was the Administrator of the Northern Territory at that time. The town of Mataranka was first gazetted on 24 May 1928 after the arrival of the North Australia Railway. The locality of Mataranka, which include the town and surrounding land were re-gazetted on 4 April 2007.

=== World War II ===
The Australian Army set up No. 42 Australian Camp Hospital near Mataranka. The 10th Australian Advanced Ordnance workshops camped in buildings made from paper bark trees and serviced wrecked and damaged vehicles. An ammunition depot was also in the locality. These depots were served by railway sidings off the main line.

It was also home to a 'Native labour gang' with a large control camp established in the town; these are now sometimes referred to as the 'Aboriginal labour force' in recognition of the offensiveness of the original name given. The army, through the Native Affairs Branch, employed Aboriginal men to perform key roles throughout the Northern Territory and these gangs completed many large scale infrastructure projects and were instrumental to the war effort. In 1943 200 Aboriginal labourers were employed through this scheme and based at Mataranka; many of these men were working on railway gangs.

=== Railways ===
Mataranka was served by the original narrow gauge railway that closed in 1976 after cyclone damage. The new standard gauge railway opened in 2003. It passes about 20 km to the west of the town.

== Notable residents ==
- Vai Stanton, Aboriginal rights activist
