= Birdum, Northern Territory =

Birdum Northern Territory
- Coordinates: 16°13′55″S 133°12′04″E
- Population: 86 (2016 census)
- Established: 4 April 2007
- Postcode(s): 0852
- Time zone: ACST (UTC+9:30)
- Location: 493 km (306 mi) S of Darwin
- LGA(s): Roper Gulf Region
- Territory electorate(s): Barkly
- Federal division(s): Lingiari
Mean max temp	Mean min temp	Annual rainfall
33.9 °C; 93 °F	19.6 °C; 67 °F	859.6 mm 33.8 in
Suburbs around Birdum:
Elsey	Elsey	Limmen
Elsey; Larimah; Sturt Plateau; Victoria River; Tanami East	Birdum	Arnold; Pamayu
Tanami East	Pamayu	Pamayu
- Footnotes: Locations; Adjoining localities (Note: the locality of Birdum fully surrounds the locality of Daly Waters.)

Birdum is a locality in the Northern Territory of Australia located about 493 kilometres (306 mi) south of the territory capital of Darwin.

== History ==
=== Railway ===
Birdum was the terminus of the North Australia Railway from 1929 until the outbreak of World War II.

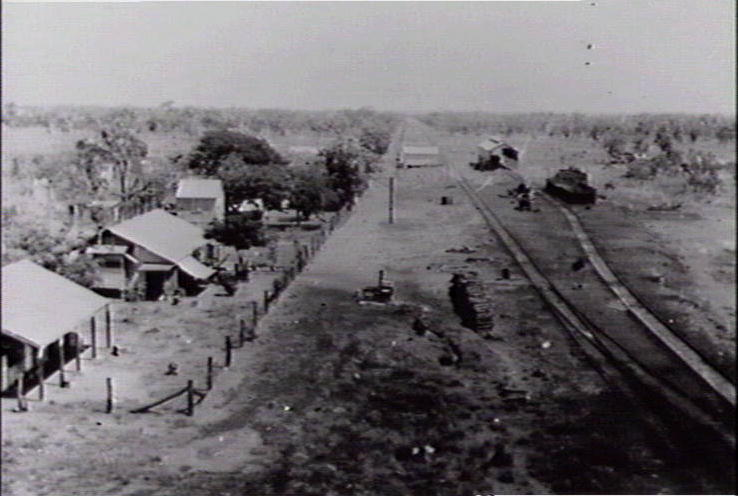
Railway station at Birdum, circa 1940

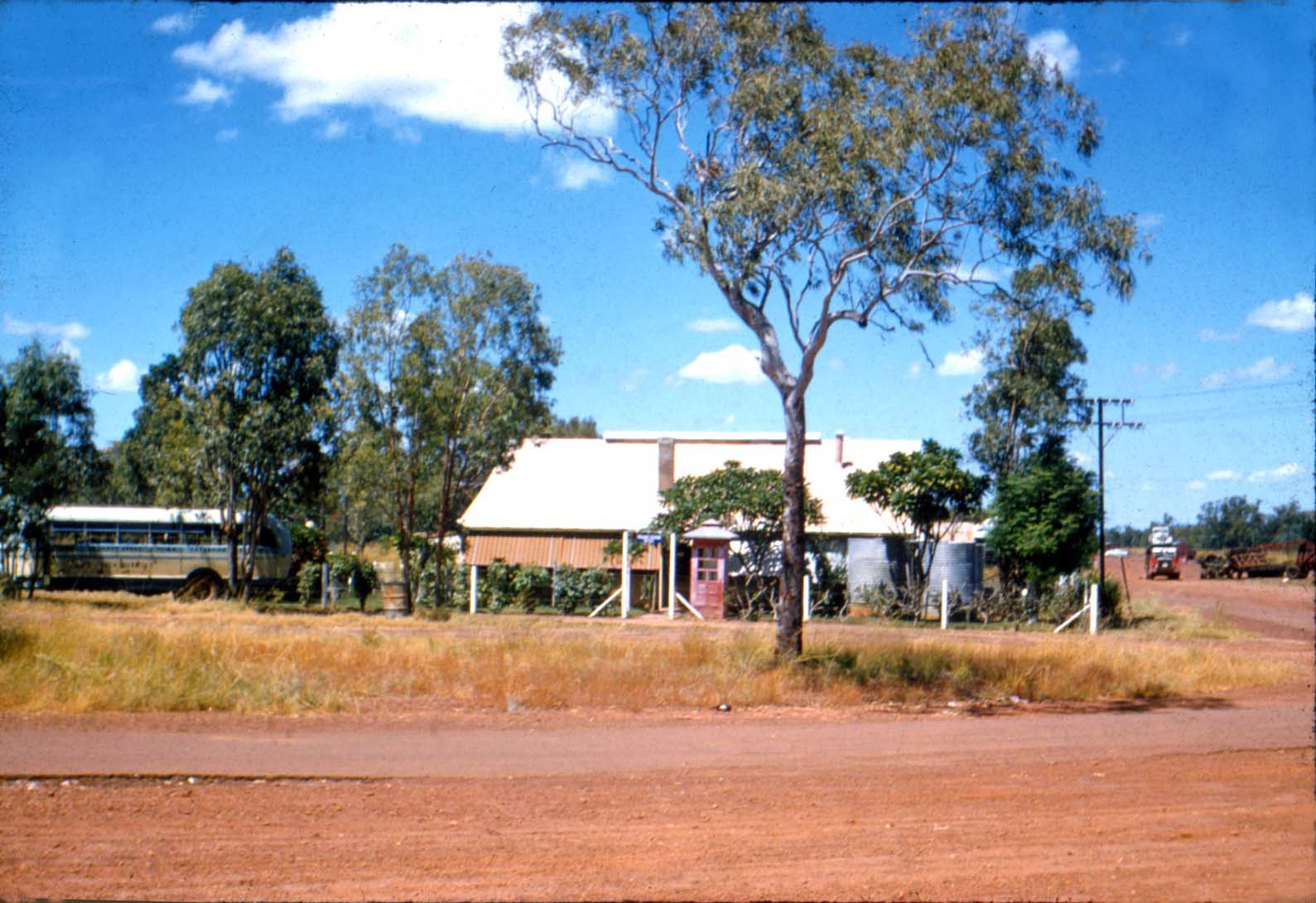
The post office at Birdum, c. 1950s

While the town remains very much unheard of, even amongst Territorians, it features on an unusually high proportion of vintage 20th century world globes, thanks to the position it once held at the end of the line.

From World War II onwards trains terminated at Larrimah, 97 kilometres to the north, and Birdum lost not only its position of importance but also its pub, which was uprooted and shifted to Larrimah as a result.

Much of the railway infrastructure remained in place until the line closed in 1976.

=== World War II ===
After the bombing of Darwin during World War II, the Darwin civilian population was evacuated and the evacuees were transported by rail to Birdum siding where they were transferred to an army convoy to take them to Alice Springs.

An evacuation hospital was constructed at Birdum by the United States Army 135th Medical Regiment in September 1942.

The Royal Australian Air Force constructed a Base Personnel Staff Officer (BPSO) and Telecommunications Camp near Birdum.

No. 11 Signals Unit RAAF, which was part of No. 55 Operational Base Unit (OBU) was based at Birdum. The unit would be on aircraft listening watch and have to listen for a word which would indicate the air raid against enemy forces or bases had been successful or not. The equipment used was Kingsley AR7 receivers.

=== Heritage places ===
The following places listed on the Northern Territory Heritage Register are located within Birdum:

- Wimmera Home
- Frew Ponds Overland Telegraph Poles
