= Lasseter Highway =

Highway in the Northern Territory

Lasseter Highway Northern Territory
- Map of central Australia with Lasseter Highway highlighted in red

General information
- Type: Highway
- Length: 244 km (152 mi)
- Route number(s): A4

Major junctions
- West end: Tjukaruru Road, Uluru-Katatjuta National Park
- Yulara Drive; Giles Street; Luritja Road (State Route 3)
- East end: Stuart Highway (A87), Erldunda

Location(s)
- Major settlements: Yulara, Curtin Springs, Mount Ebenezer

Highway system
- Highways in Australia; National Highway • Freeways in Australia; Highways in the Northern Territory

Lasseter Highway is a fully sealed 244 km (152 mi) highway in the Northern Territory of Australia. It connects Yulara, Kata Tjuta and Uluru east to the Stuart Highway at Erldunda. The highway is named after Lewis Hubert (Harold Bell) Lasseter, who claimed to have discovered a fabulously rich gold reef (Lasseter's Reef) west of Kata Tjuta.

== Junctions ==
Location	km	mi	Destinations	Notes
Yulara	0	0.0	Tjukaruru Road (C4)	Route 4 continues to Kata Tjuta then to the Western Australian border becoming the Great Central Road
Yulara	0	0.0	Yulara Drive	
Yulara	1.5	0.93	Giles Street	
Petermann	95	59	Mulga Park Road	
Petermann	180	110	Luritja Road (State Route 3)	
Ghan	288	179	Stuart Highway (A87) – Adelaide, Darwin	
1.000 mi = 1.609 km; 1.000 km = 0.621 mi

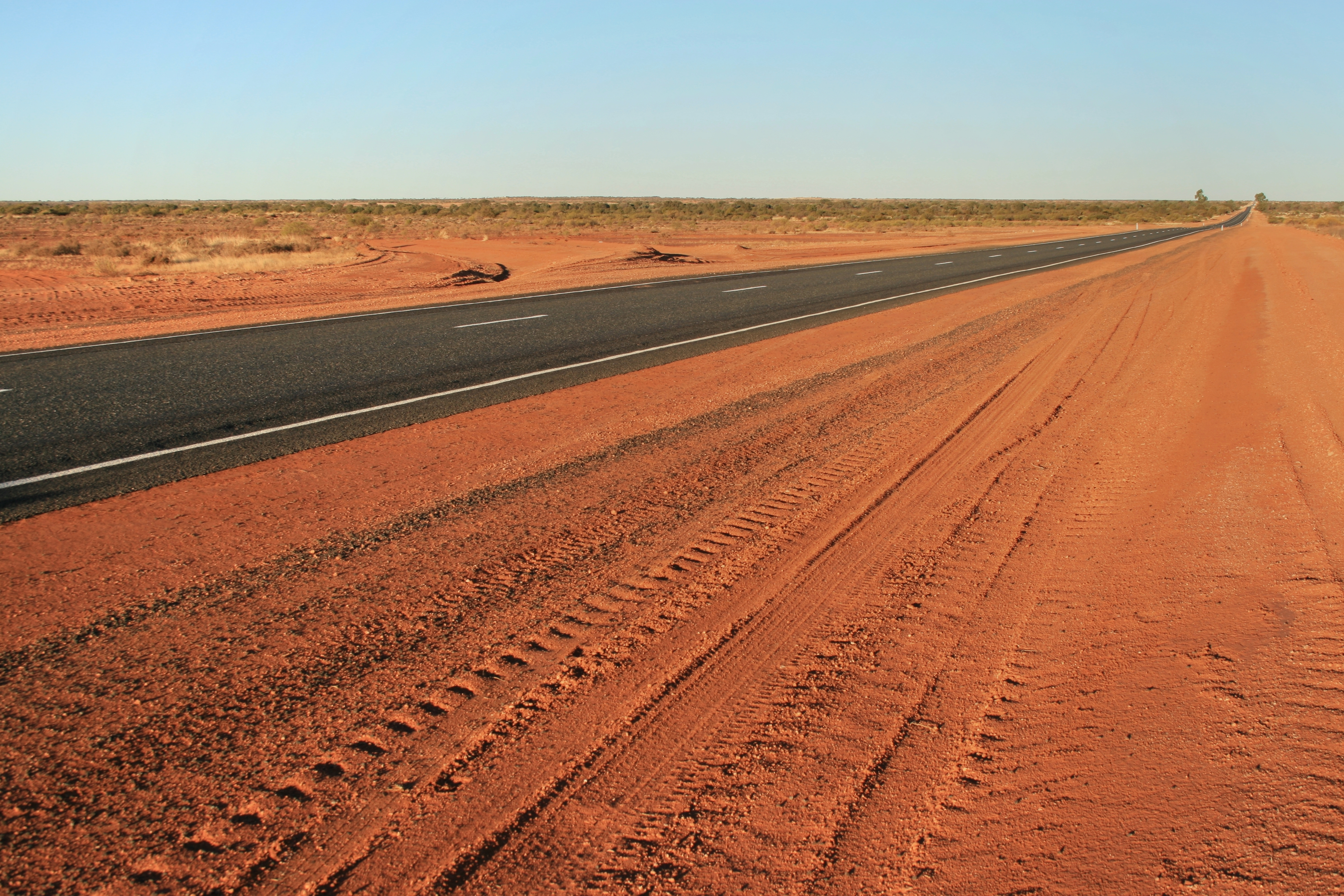
Looking east along the Lasseter Highway toward Erldunda

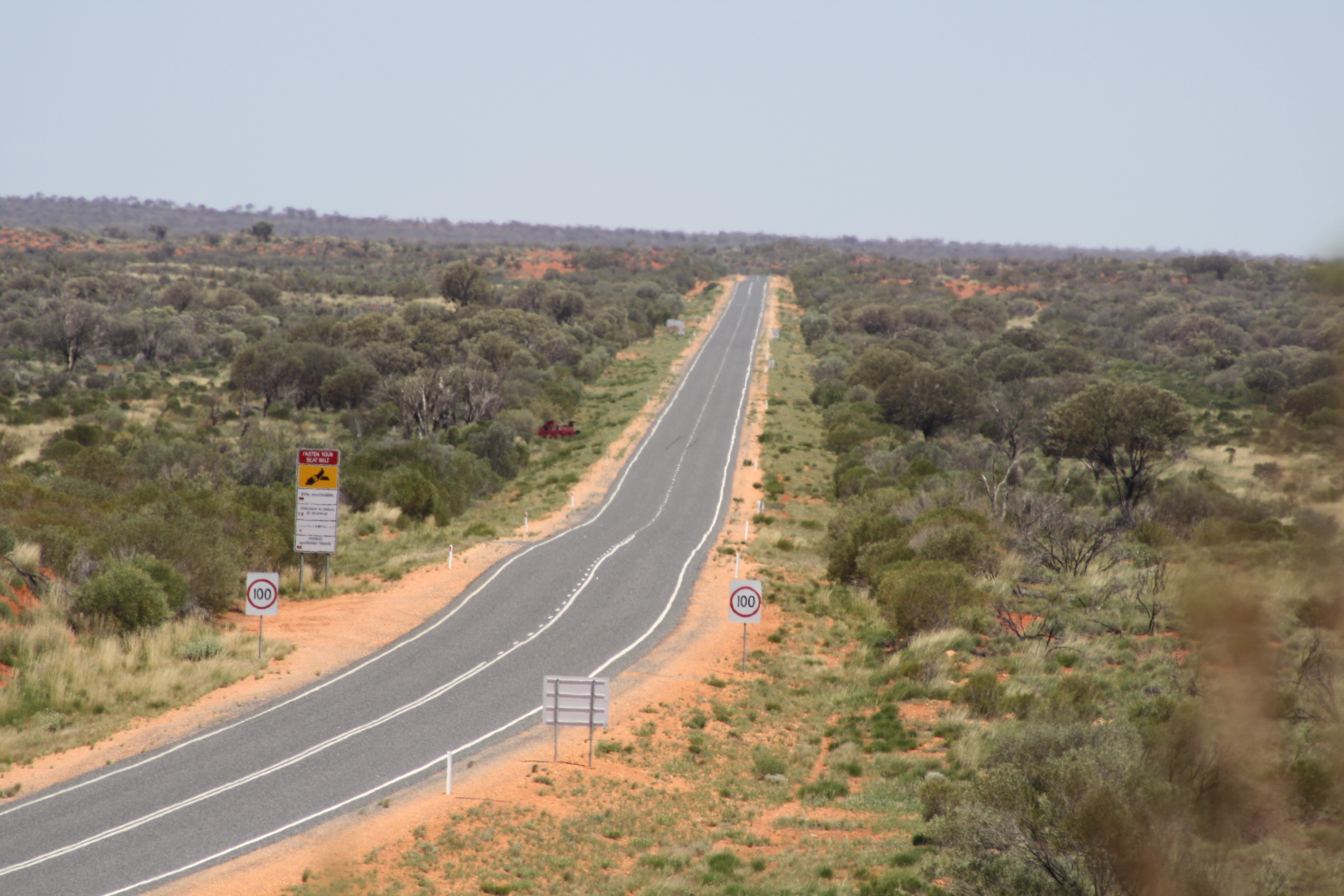
Lasseter Highway at Mount Conner Lookout near Lake Amadeus, March 2010

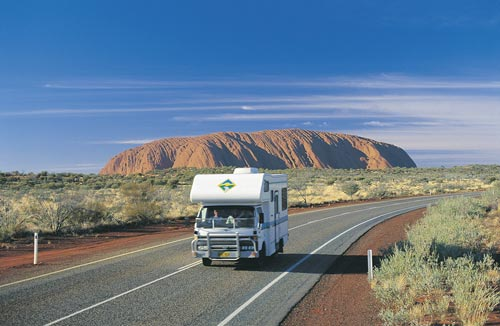
Driving on the Lasseter Highway near the Uluru-Kata Tjuta National Park in the Northern Territory.

== See also ==
- Highways in Australia
- List of highways in the Northern Territory
