= Daly Waters, Northern Territory =

Daly Waters
- Town
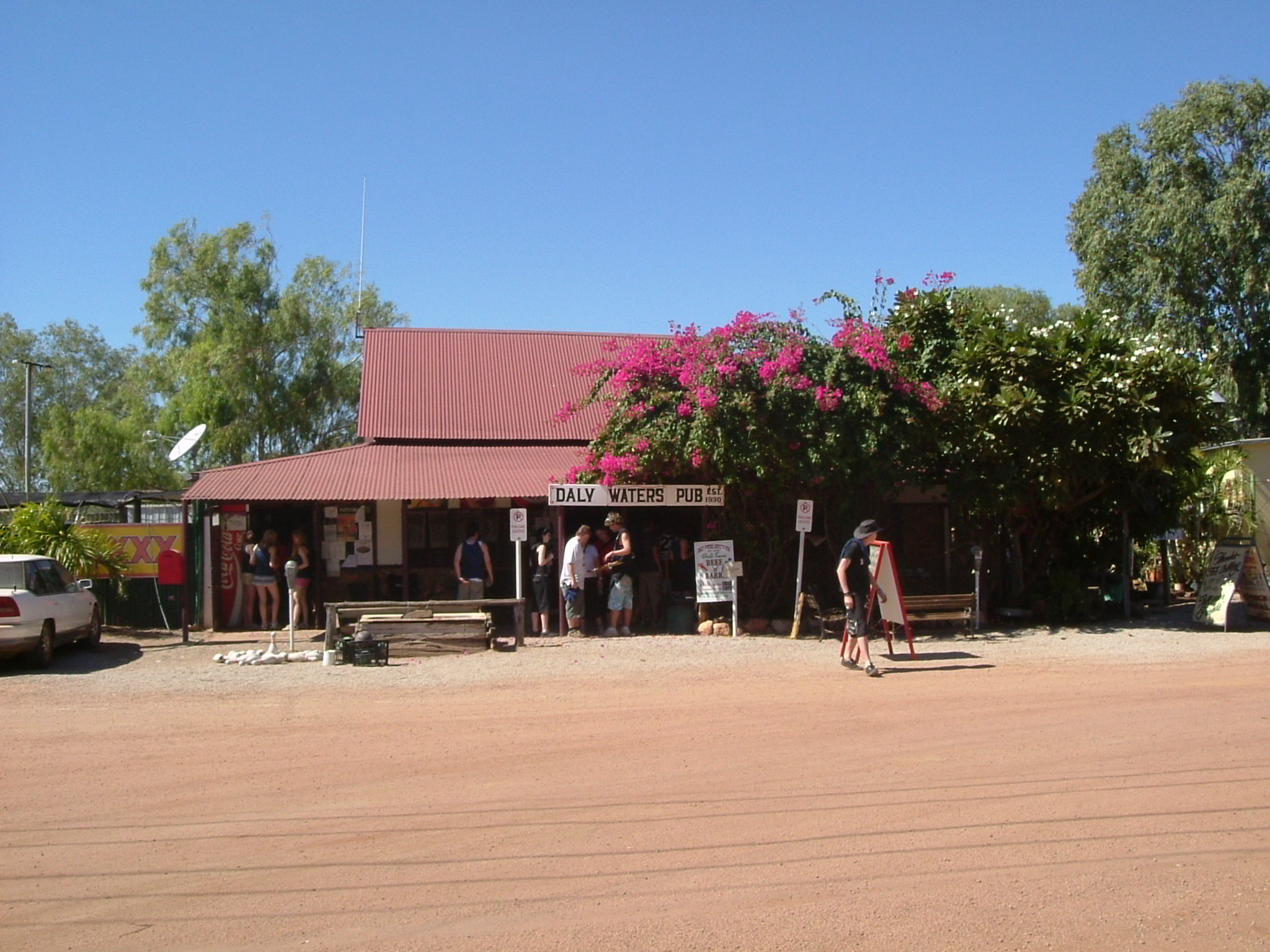
- The front of the famous Daly Waters Pub

- Coordinates: 16°15′44″S 133°22′45″E
- Country: Australia
- State: Northern Territory
- LGA: Roper Gulf Region
- Location: 620 km (390 mi) S of Darwin; 273 km (170 mi) S of Katherine; 407 km (253 mi) N of Tennant Creek
- Established: 1927 (town); 4 April 2007 (locality)

Government
  - Territory electorate: Barkly
  - Federal division: Lingiari
- Elevation: 212 m (696 ft)

Population
  - Total: 55 (2021 census)
- Time zone: UTC+9:30 (ACST)
Localities around Daly Waters
Birdum	Birdum	Birdum
Birdum	Daly Waters	Birdum
Birdum	Birdum	Birdum

Daly Waters is a town and locality in the Northern Territory of Australia, located about 620 kilometres (390 mi) south of the territory capital of Darwin at the intersection of the Carpentaria Highway and the Stuart Highway. In the 2021 census, the locality of Daly Waters had a population of 55 people.

The area's traditional owners, the Jingili people, believe the Dreaming tracks of the Emu and the Sun travelled through here on their way to the southern parts of the Northern Territory.

== History ==
The name Daly Waters was given to a series of natural springs by John McDouall Stuart during his third attempt to cross Australia from south to north, in 1861–62. Stuart named the springs after the new Governor of South Australia, Sir Dominick Daly.

Stuart's first attempt, in 1860, had reached Tennant Creek. The second, in early 1861, pushed further north but again Stuart turned back. The third journey left Adelaide in October 1861 and reached Daly Waters on 28 May. The party had been pushing through difficult lancewood scrub and harsh terrain at a little over a kilometre a day. This journey was successful, reaching the north coast near modern Darwin on 24 July 1862. Stuart's Tree has an 'S' carved into it by Stuart during his journey.

The Overland Telegraph Line reached Daly Waters from the north in June 1872 and for two months a 'pony express' carried messages the 421 km to Tennant Creek via Renner Springs.

Daly Waters Airfield was a refuelling stop for the London to Melbourne air race of 1919, a refuelling stop for early Qantas flights to Singapore, a World War II Airforce base, including a field hospital, and more recently an operational base for joint military manoeuvres. Although the aerodrome was closed to commercial traffic in 1969, the original Qantas hangar still stands, housing exhibits of photographs and equipment from the area's aviation past.

The traditional owners of the area became the fourth Indigenous group in the Northern Territory to gain native title over both the townsite and ten surrounding pastoral leases covering an area of 30,000 square kilometres (11,583 sq mi). The Federal Court of Australia had a special ceremonial sitting on nearby Newcastle Waters Station to commemorate the occasion.

== Trivia ==
The main attraction for tourists is the famous Daly Waters Pub, which is decorated throughout with banknotes and other memorabilia left by visitors from every corner of the globe. The historic pub was licensed in 1938 to service passengers and crew from the nearby airfield.

Other services are available at the Hi-Way Inn roadhouse, at the junction of the Carpentaria Highway.

== Gallery ==
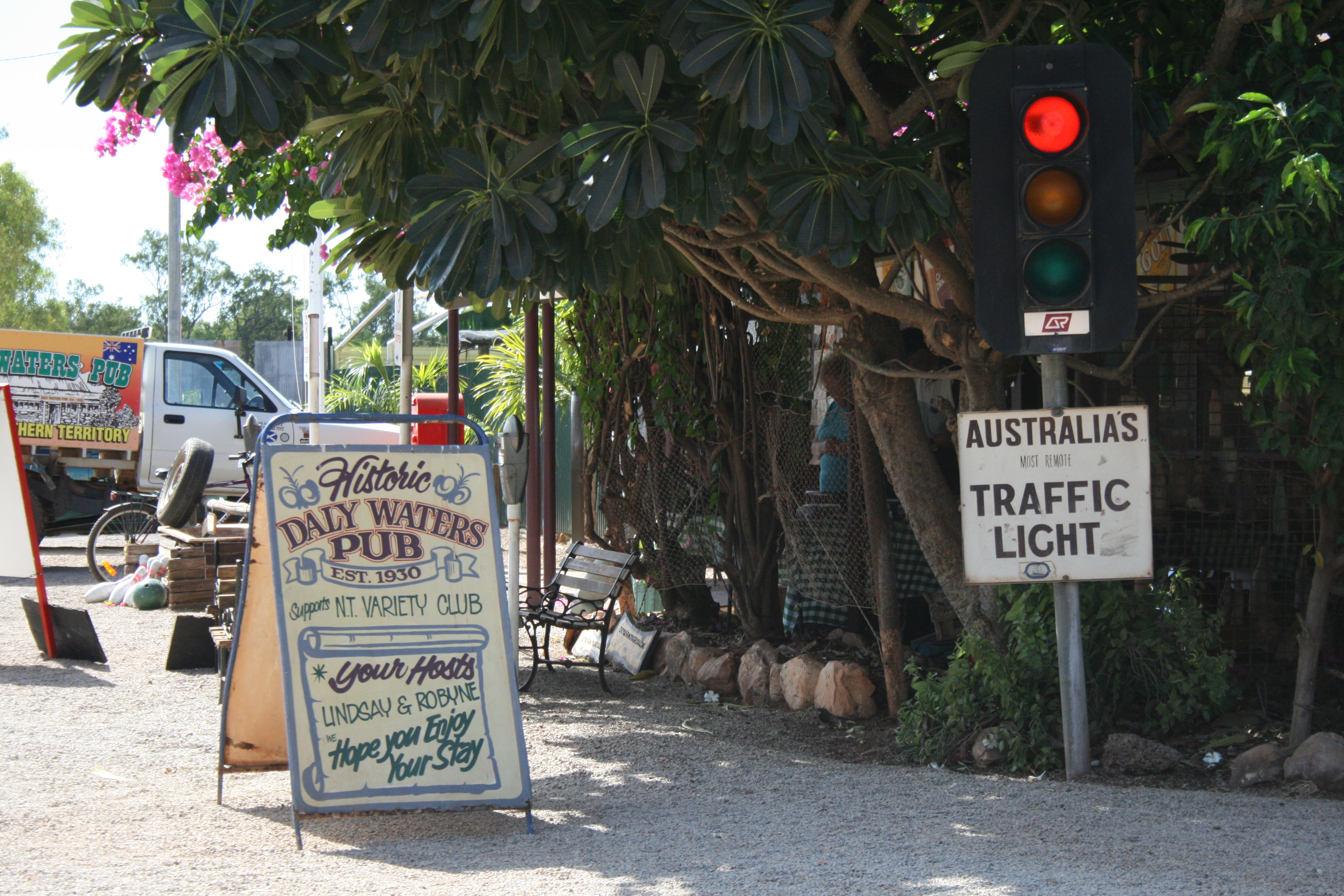
The Daly Waters "traffic light"

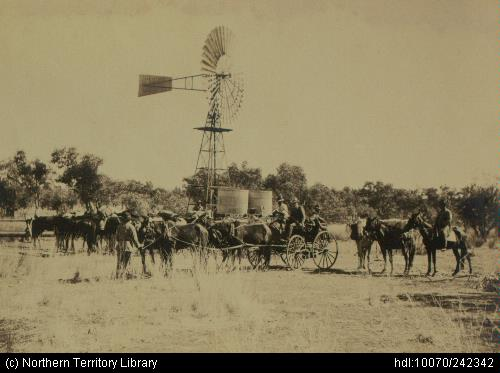
Government Bores, Overland Telegraph (OT) route. Water tanks, windmill, packing up camp onto the buggy.

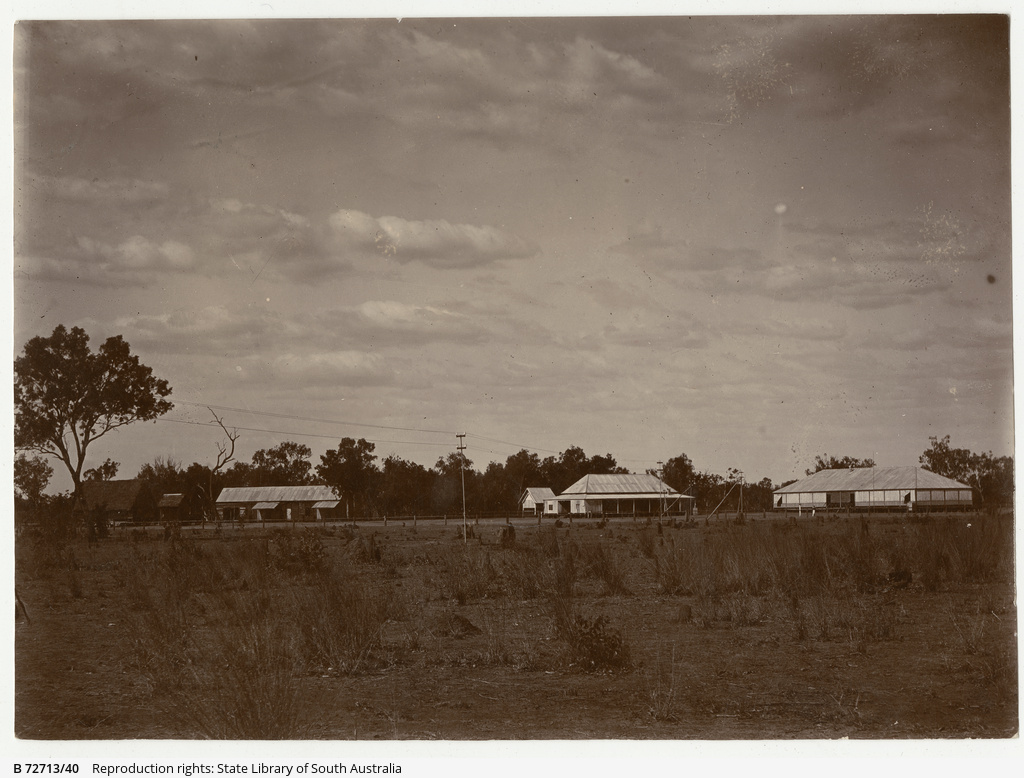
Daly Waters Telegraph Station

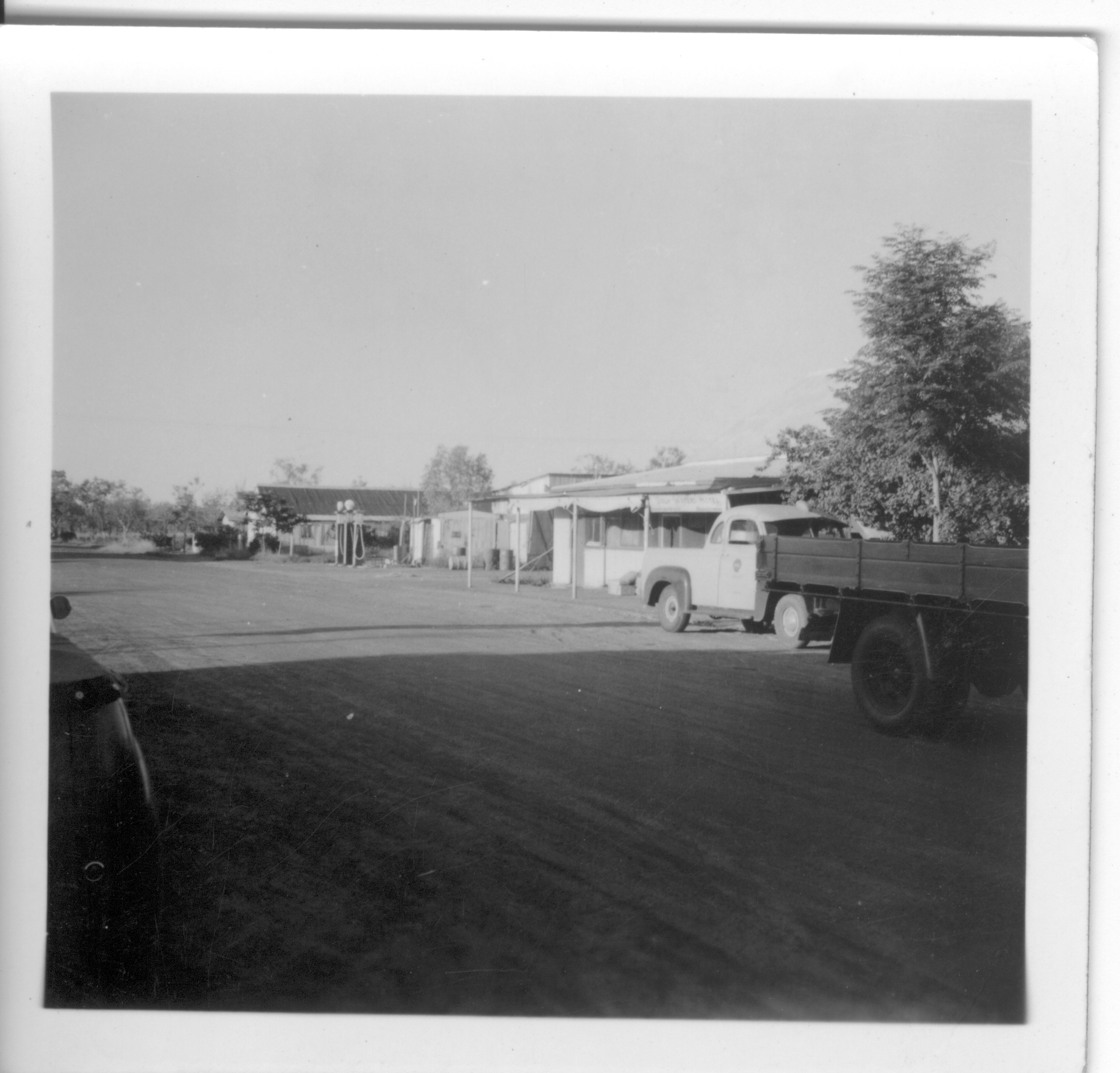
Daly Waters in January 1955

== Climate ==
Northam has a hot semi-arid climate (Köppen: BSh) with two distinct seasons. There is a sultry, oppressive wet season from November to March and a cooler, extremely sunny dry season from April to October. The wet season has highly erratic rainfall due to the El Niño Southern Oscillation. For instance only 225.9 millimetres or 8.89 inches of rain fell in 1952, but as much as 634.8 millimetres or 24.99 inches in December 2015. Meanwhile, the dry season is consistently dry, with significantly cooler nights, lower humidity and greater sunshine.

Climate data for Daly Waters Airstrip (16º16'S, 133º23'E, 210 m AMSL) (1939–2024 normals and extremes)
Month	Jan	Feb	Mar	Apr	May	Jun	Jul	Aug	Sep	Oct	Nov	Dec	Year
Record high °C (°F)	43.7 (110.7)	42.4 (108.3)	43.2 (109.8)	40.8 (105.4)	38.6 (101.5)	36.3 (97.3)	36.2 (97.2)	37.8 (100.0)	40.9 (105.6)	44.0 (111.2)	44.5 (112.1)	45.6 (114.1)	45.6 (114.1)
Mean daily maximum °C (°F)	35.8 (96.4)	35.0 (95.0)	34.9 (94.8)	34.1 (93.4)	31.4 (88.5)	29.0 (84.2)	29.2 (84.6)	31.3 (88.3)	35.0 (95.0)	37.5 (99.5)	38.2 (100.8)	37.5 (99.5)	34.1 (93.4)
Mean daily minimum °C (°F)	24.1 (75.4)	23.5 (74.3)	22.5 (72.5)	19.6 (67.3)	15.9 (60.6)	13.1 (55.6)	11.8 (53.2)	12.6 (54.7)	16.8 (62.2)	21.0 (69.8)	23.5 (74.3)	24.2 (75.6)	19.0 (66.2)
Record low °C (°F)	16.8 (62.2)	12.8 (55.0)	11.4 (52.5)	9.1 (48.4)	4.8 (40.6)	1.3 (34.3)	0.8 (33.4)	2.3 (36.1)	4.3 (39.7)	8.4 (47.1)	12.5 (54.5)	13.0 (55.4)	0.8 (33.4)
Average precipitation mm (inches)	167.3 (6.59)	188.1 (7.41)	110.0 (4.33)	20.8 (0.82)	6.2 (0.24)	2.9 (0.11)	2.6 (0.10)	0.3 (0.01)	1.8 (0.07)	21.3 (0.84)	52.9 (2.08)	116.8 (4.60)	695.6 (27.39)
Average precipitation days (≥ 1.0 mm)	12.1	11.7	7.8	1.9	0.6	0.4	0.3	0.1	0.3	2.2	5.2	9.2	51.8
Average afternoon relative humidity (%)	45	48	41	31	29	27	24	20	18	21	25	35	30
Average dew point °C (°F)	18.9 (66.0)	19.3 (66.7)	16.7 (62.1)	12.7 (54.9)	8.9 (48.0)	6.6 (43.9)	4.3 (39.7)	3.3 (37.9)	4.8 (40.6)	8.8 (47.8)	11.6 (52.9)	15.5 (59.9)	10.9 (51.7)
Mean monthly sunshine hours	254.2	231.7	269.7	279.0	300.7	303.0	313.1	337.9	315.0	313.1	285.0	275.9	3,478.3
Percentage possible sunshine	63	65	71	79	85	90	90	94	88	81	74	68	79
Source: Bureau of Meteorology (1939–2024 normals and extremes)
