= Watarrka National Park =

National park in the Northern Territory, Australia

- IUCN category II (national park)
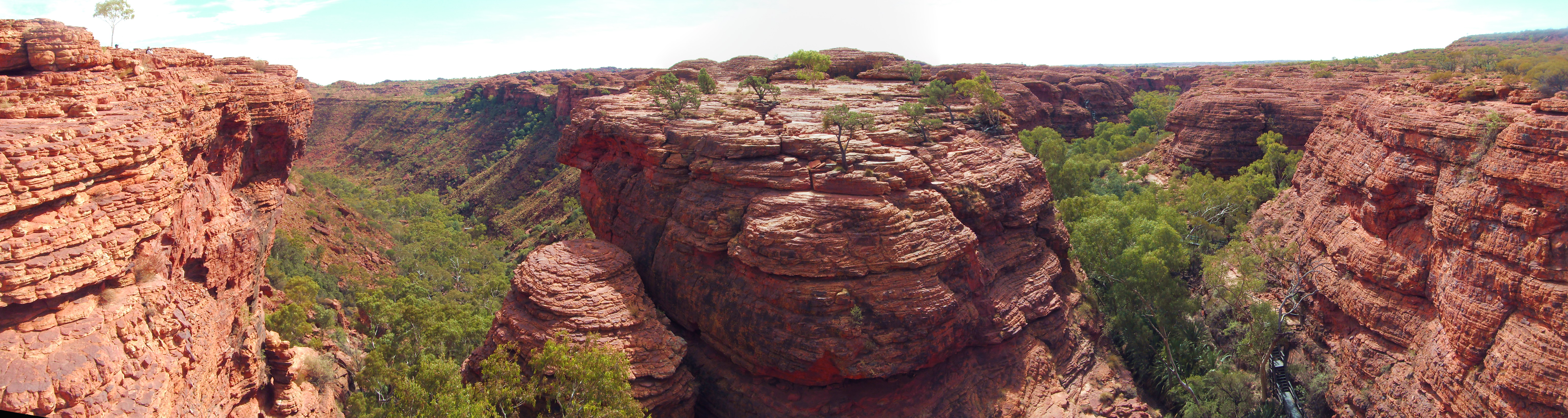
- Kings Canyon

- Location within Northern Territory
- Location: Northern Territory, Petermann
- Nearest city: Yulara
- Coordinates: 24°16′47″S 131°33′30″E
- Area: 1,051.85 km^{2} (406.12 sq mi)
- Established: 31 July 1989
- Visitors: 176,100 (in 2022)
- Governing body: Parks and Wildlife Commission of the Northern Territory
- Website: Official website

Watarrka National Park is a protected area in the Northern Territory of Australia, which contains the popular Kings Canyon (Watarrka).

== Location ==
The park is located about 1,316 km (818 mi) south of Darwin and 323 km (201 mi) southwest of Alice Springs.

== History ==
Watarrka National Park was established in 1989, on the traditional lands of the Matutjara people. It is named after the Aboriginal (Luritja and Arrernte) name for Kings Creek and Canyon watarrka (pronounced what-ARR-kah). This is the Luritja word for the local umbrella bush (Acacia ligulata) that grows in the vicinity.

The park was established on land owned by England-born Jack Cotterill and his two sons, Jack and Jim, who opened it up for tourism from their property, Wallara Ranch.

== Description ==
The national park is categorised as an IUCN Category II protected area. On 25 March 1986, it was listed on the now-defunct Register of the National Estate.

It contains the popular Kings Canyon (Watarrka) at the western end of the George Gill Range and Kathleen Springs, around 21 km (13 mi) to the southeast of Kings Canyon.

In 1986, Kings Canyon was described by the Department of Environment as follows:

One of the most spectacular canyons in Central Australia. Kings Canyon contains some 60 rare or relict plant species and a total of 572 different plant species and 80 species of birds. It is a 'living plant museum' and is notable for its stands of cycads & permanent rock pools. There are some well-preserved Aboriginal paintings and engravings in the area...

== Climate ==
Climate data for Watarrka, elevation 614 m (2,014 ft), (1991–2020 normals)
Month	Jan	Feb	Mar	Apr	May	Jun	Jul	Aug	Sep	Oct	Nov	Dec	Year
Mean daily maximum °C (°F)	38.4 (101.1)	36.9 (98.4)	35.1 (95.2)	30.9 (87.6)	25.0 (77.0)	21.4 (70.5)	22.0 (71.6)	24.5 (76.1)	29.7 (85.5)	33.1 (91.6)	35.1 (95.2)	36.4 (97.5)	30.7 (87.3)
Mean daily minimum °C (°F)	23.5 (74.3)	23.0 (73.4)	20.8 (69.4)	16.7 (62.1)	10.9 (51.6)	6.4 (43.5)	6.1 (43.0)	8.2 (46.8)	13.2 (55.8)	17.5 (63.5)	19.8 (67.6)	22.0 (71.6)	15.7 (60.2)
Average rainfall mm (inches)	45.7 (1.80)	39.8 (1.57)	29.2 (1.15)	12.8 (0.50)	16.8 (0.66)	14.6 (0.57)	13.4 (0.53)	5.8 (0.23)	10.0 (0.39)	24.8 (0.98)	44.7 (1.76)	39.5 (1.56)	297.1 (11.7)
Average rainy days (≥ 1.0 mm)	3.8	3.5	2.2	1.8	2.1	1.7	1.6	1.1	1.8	3.1	4.5	5.2	32.4
Source: Australian Bureau of Meteorology

== See also ==
- Protected areas of the Northern Territory
