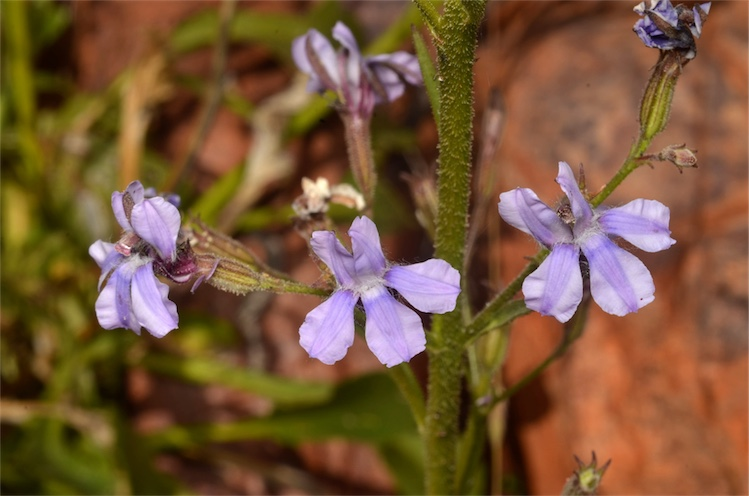
- At Trephina Gorge

Scientific classification
- Kingdom: Plantae
- Clade: Tracheophytes
- Clade: Angiosperms
- Clade: Eudicots
- Clade: Asterids
- Order: Asterales
- Family: Goodeniaceae
- Genus: Goodenia
- Species: G. ramelii

Binomial name
- Goodenia ramelii F.Muell.

= Goodenia ramelii =

Species of plant

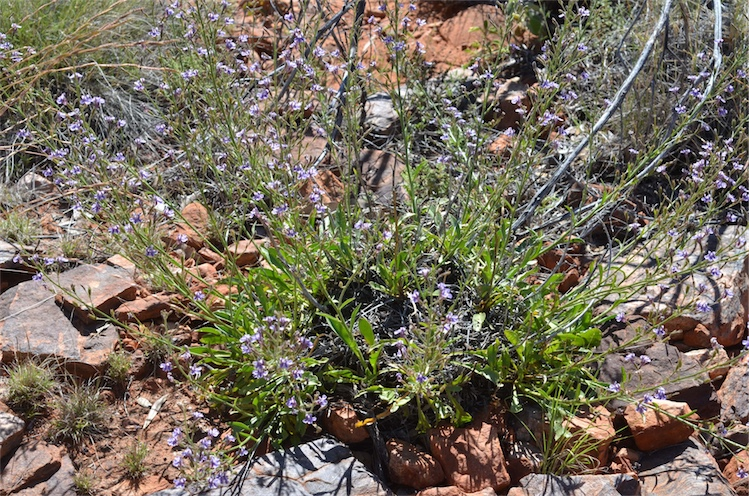
Habit

Goodenia ramelii is a species of flowering plant in the family Goodeniaceae and is endemic to central Australia. It is a perennial herb with toothed, elliptic leaves in a rosette at the base of the plant, and racemes of blue flowers.

== Description ==
Goodenia ramelii is a perennial herb that typically grows to a height of up to 1 m (3 ft 3 in). The leaves are mostly arranged in a rosette at the base of the plant, elliptic to egg-shaped, 100–250 mm (3.9–9.8 in) long and 20–45 mm (0.79–1.77 in) wide, with toothed edges. The leaves on the stems are similar but smaller. The flowers are arranged in racemes or thyrses up to 400 mm (16 in) long with lance-shaped bracts 8–15 mm (0.31–0.59 in) long and lance-shaped bracteoles 2–7 mm (0.079–0.276 in) long, each flower on a pedicel 1–4 mm (0.039–0.157 in) long. The sepals are lance-shaped, 1.5–2 mm (0.059–0.079 in) long and the corolla is blue, 12–15 mm (0.47–0.59 in) long. The lower lobes of the corolla are 7–8 mm (0.28–0.31 in) long with wings 1.5–2.0 mm (0.059–0.079 in) wide. Flowering occurs from March to September and the fruit is an oval capsule, about 7 mm (0.28 in) long.

== Taxonomy and naming ==
Goodenia ramelii was first formally described in 1862 by Ferdinand von Mueller in Fragmenta phytographiae Australiae from specimens collected near Attack Creek by John McDouall Stuart. The specific epithet (ramelii) honours Prosper Vincent Ramel, a nurseryman and merchant of Paris.

== Distribution and habitat ==
This goodenia grows in stony soils from the Gibson Desert in Western Australia to the Barkly Tableland in the Northern Territory and Queensland, and south to the far north-west of South Australia.

== Conservation status ==
Goodenia ramelii is classified as "not threatened" by the Government of Western Australia Department of Parks and Wildlife and as of "least concern" under the Northern Territory Government Territory Parks and Wildlife Conservation Act 1976 and the Queensland Government Nature Conservation Act 1992.
