= Mount Riddock Station =

Pastoral lease in the Northern Territory

Coordinates: 23°02′09″S 134°40′45″E

Location in Northern Territory

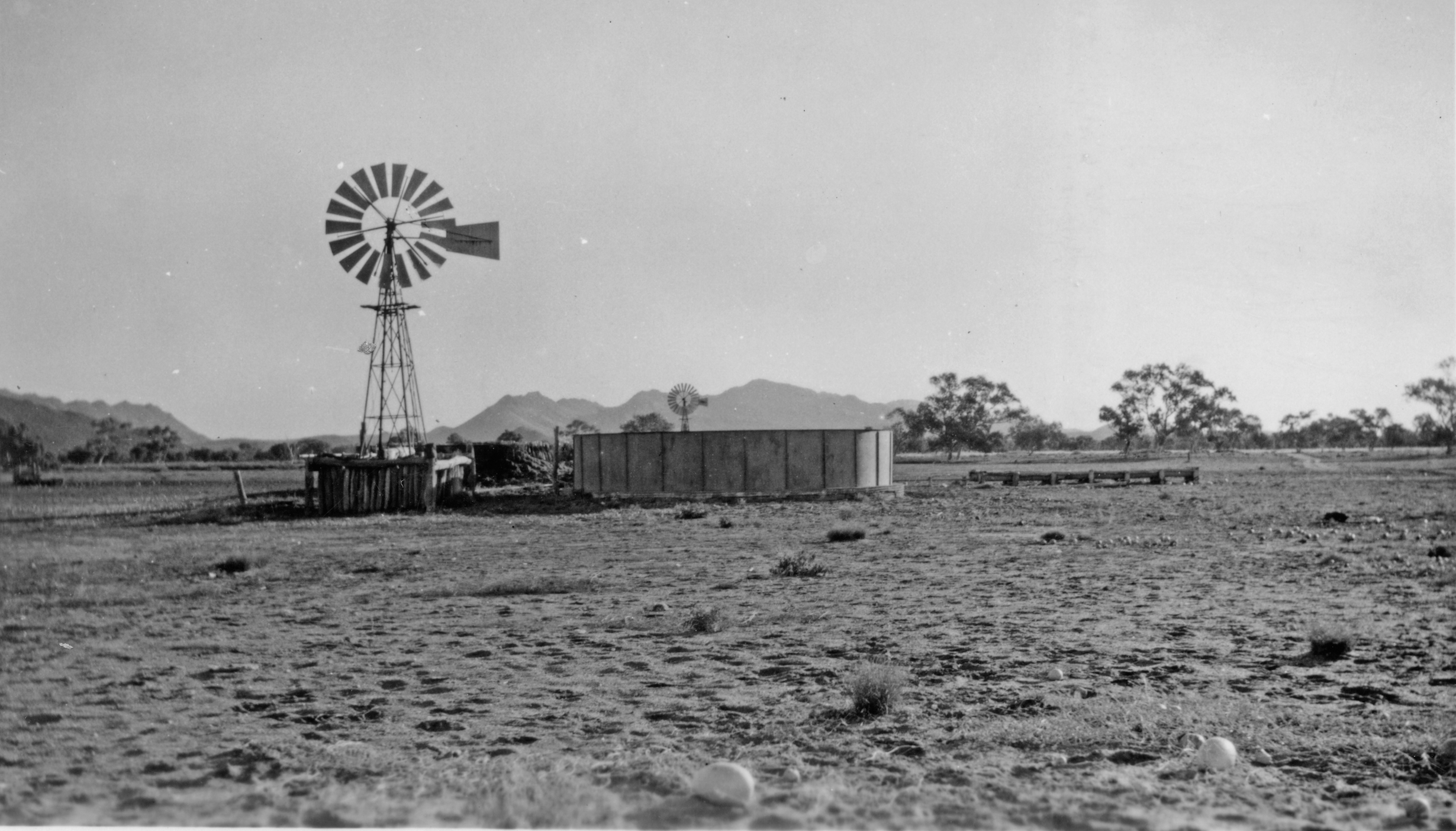
Mount Riddock Station in Central Australia in 1956

Mount Riddock Station is a 2,633 square kilometre cattle station in the Northern Territory of Australia. It is managed by Steve and Rebecca Cadzow. They run Poll Herefords on the property, which has organic certification.

== Early history ==
Eastern Aranda and Anmatjera people have lived in the region around Mount Riddock Station for thousands of years.

A station was established by Benjamin Mark Webb and Joseph Louis Schaber (1863–1940) in the early 1900s. They had originally planned to prospect for gold at Arltunga but eventually found supplying the miners with meat to be more profitable. They built the first homestead on the station in 1910. Ben Webb's three sons, Bennett, Qinton and Kil, better known as the Webb brothers, took over the station. Kil was responsible for improving the water infrastructure on the station and Bennett for the mustering, branding and droving. Joseph Louis Schaber's son Roy also managed the station. The Webbs started the annual Harts Range Races in 1946, now held each Picnic Day long weekend. The Webb brothers raced stockman Jack Schaber and the regional policeman Senior Constable Bob Darken over a distance of about a mile to the Ulgarna Yards to determine who had the fastest horse. It inspired an annual race meet. The Webb brothers purchased Golden Star, a four-year-old chestnut Arab stallion in 1949 for breeding on the station.

== Recent history ==
Dick and Ann Cadzow purchased the lease on Mount Riddock in 1986. They had previously owned Phillip Creek station near Tennant Creek. When they took over the station it had significant populations of rabbits and horses. Dick Cadzow was the winner of the 2004 Rural Press Landcare Primary Producer Award at the NT Landcare Awards. While they continue to live on the station, it is now managed their son Steve and his wife Rebecca. They have three children. Well-known Central Australia botanist Peter Latz was a ringer on Mount Riddock Station in the 1960s.

The Cadzows were among the first to adopt rotational grazing in the arid zone, working closely with researchers to monitor this management strategy. It won them an NT Landcare Award for Innovation in Sustainable Farm Practices in 2015. Cattle from Mount Riddock regularly attract the top price at the annual Alice Springs Show Sale. The Cadzows introduced the first privately owned Remote Livestock Management System in Australia on the property in 2015, allowing them to remotely weigh and draft their cattle.

An unsuccessful application was lodged to heritage list the historic homestead on Mount Riddock Station in 1994. The homestead was built between 1928 and 1930. It was dismantled in 2012 and then relocated to Gemtree Caravan Park, 140 km from Alice Springs, in 2014. A second bid to have the homestead in its new location added to the Northern Territory Heritage Register was made in 2015 with the site being gazetted on 8 April 2016.
