= Marqua Station =

Pastoral lease in the Northern Territory

Coordinates: 22°47′55″S 137°17′12″E

Location in the Northern Territory

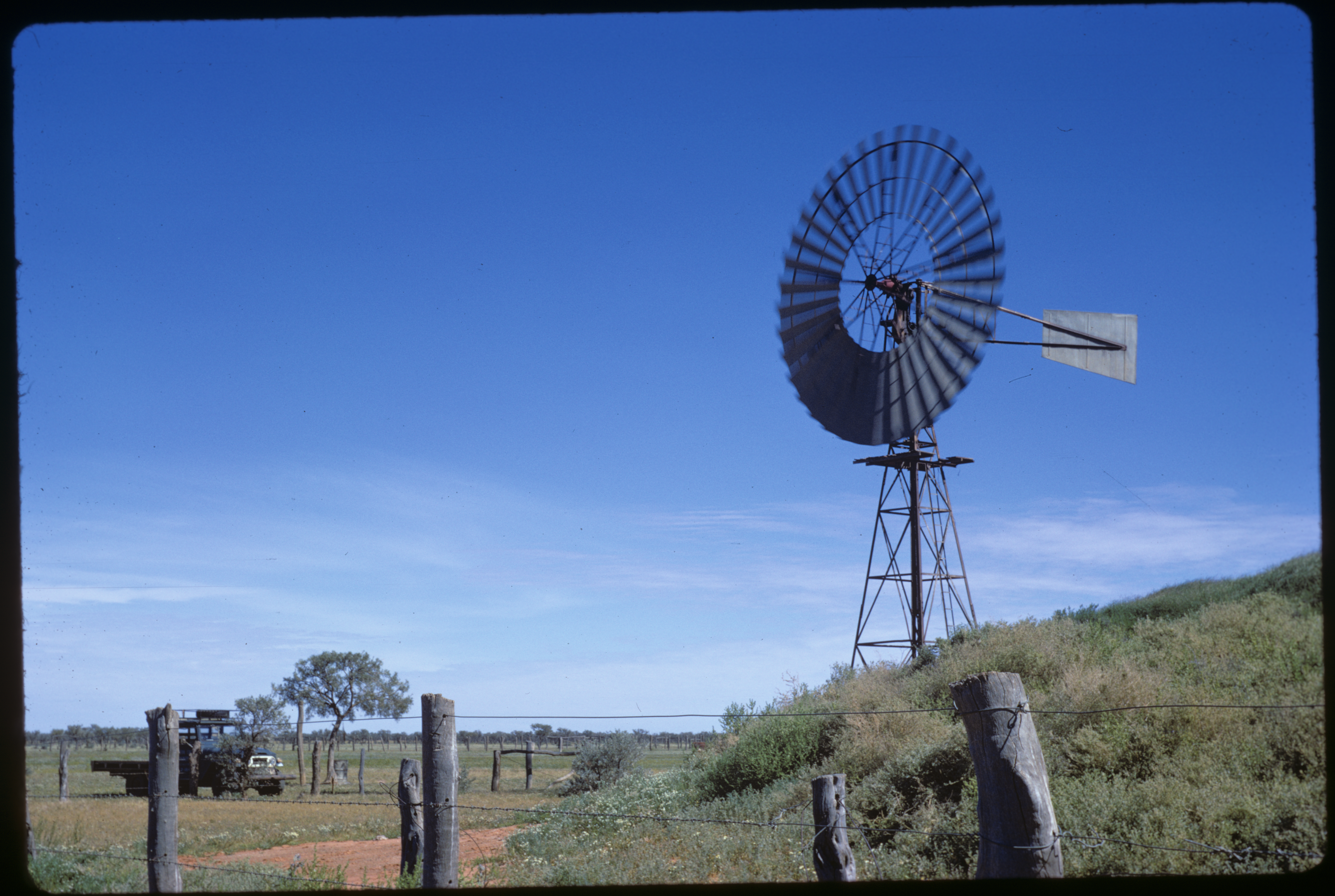
A windmill on Marqua station when installed in 1973, this photo shows the type of surrounding country

Marqua Station is a pastoral lease that operates as a cattle station in the Northern Territory of Australia.

It is situated about 200 kilometres (124 mi) south of Alpurrurulam and 360 kilometres (224 mi) north east of Alice Springs. The property shares a boundary with Tarlton Downs to the west, Manners Creek Station to the north, Tobermorey to the east and the Atnetye Aboriginal Land Trust to the south. Marqua Creek, from which the station takes its name, flows through the property at the south eastern end. The property is very close to the Plenty Highway, which almost intersects the north west corner.

In June 2011 the 4,410 km^{2} (1,700 sq mi) property was sold for A$7.22 million on a walk-in walk-out basis. The property had been acquired by John and Mary Atkins, who also own Spion Kop Station near Taroom in Queensland, who were breeding cattle at Marqua then trucking them to Spion Kop.

In September of the same year the area was plagued by the largest bushfires that had been seen there since the 1970s; some 200,000 acres (80,937 ha) of Marqua Station was burnt out.

After a prolonged dry period the property received 140 mm (5.5 in) of rain over four days in January 2020. The owner, Blair Power, reported roads and fencing being damaged but the country was responding well to the rains.

== See also ==
- List of ranches and stations
