= Skinny dip (disambiguation) =

A skinny dip is a colloquial term for nude swimming.

Skinny dip may also refer to:

- Skinny Dip (novel), by Carl Hiaasen, 2004
- Skinny Dip, a beer made by New Belgium Brewing Company
- Skinny DIP, a narrow dual in-line package in the field of electronics
- The Skinny Dip, a Canadian adventure television series

== See also ==
- Skinny Dipping (disambiguation)
- Skinny (disambiguation)
- The Skinny (disambiguation)
