= Public holidays in Australia =

Public holidays in Australia are the holidays recognised in law in Australia. Although they are declared on a state and territory basis, they comprise a mixture of nationally celebrated days and holidays exclusive to the individual jurisdictions.

Public holidays function as non-working days, with workers generally receiving full paid leave independently of annual leave. Those working on public holidays receive additional penalty rates of pay. Where they fall on a weekend, public holidays are generally declared in lieu for the following Monday.

Statutory holidays in Australia are based on varying religious, cultural and civic observations. Christian celebrations, namely Christmas and Easter, are some of the most significant ones observed. A Labour Day is observed in each state and territory, although it is varied in date. There are two significant national days, Australia Day (26 January) and Anzac Day (25 April), which are nationwide public holidays.

When a public holiday occurs on a Friday or Monday, the three-day period is colloquially known as a "long weekend".

== Nature of public holidays ==
Traditionally, Australians in employment (whether in the public or private sector) have had the right to take a public holiday off work with regular pay. In recent years this tradition has changed somewhat. For example, businesses that normally open on a public holiday may request employees to work on that day. Employers can deny employees a holiday only on reasonable business grounds.

From 2006, WorkChoices eliminated the entitlement to penalty rates in many workplaces; however since the implementation of the Fair Work Act 2009 and the modern awards in 2010, most public-holiday penalty rates have increased dramatically. As of 2018 employees generally receive pay at a penalty rate—usually 2.5 times (known as "double time and a half") the base rate of pay—when they work on a public holiday.

Besides designating days as public holidays, Australian authorities also designate some of these days as restricted trading days.

Public holidays are determined by a combination of:

- statutes, with specific gazetting of public holidays
- industrial awards and agreements

If a standard public holiday falls on a weekend, a substitute public holiday will sometimes be observed on the first non-weekend day (usually Monday) after the weekend, whether by virtue of the public holiday legislation or by ad hoc proclamation. Workers required to work on a public holiday or substituted public holiday will usually be entitled to remuneration at a holiday penalty rate.

All states have their own public holidays in addition to national public holidays, and in some states certain public holidays, such as Melbourne Cup Day, are in force in only part of a state.

Alcohol licences in several states prevent sale of alcohol on certain public holidays, such as Good Friday.

== Public holidays ==
Date	ACT	NSW	NT	QLD	SA	TAS	VIC	WA
1 January	New Year's Day							
26 January	Australia Day							
2nd Monday in February	No	No	No	No	No	H Royal Hobart Regatta	No	No
1st Monday in March	No	No	No	No	No	No	No	Labour Day
2nd Monday in March	Canberra Day	No	No	No	Adelaide Cup Day	Eight Hours Day	Labour Day	No
Variable date	Good Friday							
Variable date	Easter Saturday			The day after Good Friday	Easter Saturday	No	Saturday before Easter Sunday	No
Variable date	Easter Sunday		Easter Sunday	Easter Sunday	Easter Sunday	No	Easter Sunday	Easter Sunday
Variable date	Easter Monday							
Variable date	No	No	No	No	No	C Easter Tuesday	No	No
25 April	Anzac Day							
1st Monday in May	No	No	May Day	Labour Day	No	No	No	No
1st Monday after or on 27 May	Reconciliation Day	No	No	No	No	No	No	No
1st Monday in June	No	No	No	No	No	No	No	Western Australia Day
2nd Monday in June	King's Birthday			No	King's Birthday			No
1st Monday in August	No	No	Picnic Day	No	No	No	No	No
1st Wednesday after 9 August	No	No	No	B Royal Queensland Show	No	No	No	No
As proclaimed by the Governor of Western Australia (September/October)	No	No	No	No	No	No	No	King's Birthday
Friday before the AFL Grand Final (usually held on the last Sat in Sept or first in Oct)	No	No	No	No	No	No	Friday before the Australian Football League Grand Final	No
1st Monday in October	Labour Day		No	King's Birthday	Labour Day	No	No	No
1st Monday in November	No	No	No	No	No	NH Recreation Day	No	No
1st Tuesday in November	No	No	No	No	No	No	Melbourne Cup†	No
24 December	No	No*	P Christmas Eve	P Christmas Eve	P Christmas Eve	No	No	No
25 December	Christmas Day							
26 December	Boxing Day				Proclamation Day	Boxing Day		
31 December	No	No	P New Year's Eve	No	P New Year's Eve	No	No	No
Total holidays	13	11	11 + 2 part days	11 + 1 part day	12 + 2 part days	12	13	11

Legend:
B City of Brisbane only. The Royal National Agricultural (RNA) Show Day (Brisbane only) is held on the Wednesday during the RNA Show period. The RNA Show commences on the first Friday in August, unless the first Friday is prior to 5 August, then it commences on the second Friday of August. Other Queensland show holidays: Show holiday dates | Public, school and show holidays
C = Conditional: Public Service employees or where defined in Employment Agreement/Award

H = Hobart area only
NH = Not Hobart area
P Part day, from 7 pm to midnight (6 pm to midnight for QLD)
† Often substituted with the Geelong Cup for Geelong residents. For regional Victoria other local cup days are sometimes substituted.
* Depends on occupation, generally from 6 pm to midnight

=== Substitute holidays for holidays falling on a weekend ===
When a public holiday falls on a weekend, the following work day may be considered a public holiday depending on the state/territory and the holiday in question.

Name	ACT	NSW	NT	QLD	SA	TAS	VIC	WA
New Year's Day	Yes							
Australia Day	Yes							
Easter Monday	Not applicable (always on a Monday)							Yes (when another public holiday coincides)
Anzac Day	Yes	Yes (for both 2026 and 2027)	Yes (only if Sunday)		No			Yes
Christmas Eve	Not applicable (not a holiday)		No			Not applicable (not a holiday)		
Christmas Day	Yes							
Boxing Day / Proclamation Day	Yes							
New Year's Eve	Not applicable (not a holiday)		No	Not applicable (not a holiday)	No	Not applicable (not a holiday)		

Holidays that always fall on a particular day of the week are not listed in this table. Prior to 2008, Victorian law only specified substitute holidays for New Year and Boxing Day, and only if they fell on a Sunday. From 2008, Victorian law specifies the substitute holidays in the table above.

Since Easter Monday can occur as late as 26 April it is possible for the Easter Monday holiday to coincide with Anzac Day, as occurred in 2011. State Acts do not give a provision to separate the days when this occurs, so no additional public holiday is given by law. However an extra day is usually proclaimed by the minister, so as to have a steady number of public holidays each year. In the year 2038, Anzac Day will coincide with Easter Sunday.

=== Australia Day ===
Recorded celebrations of the 26 January date back to 1808 in Australia, and in 1818, Governor Lachlan Macquarie held the first official celebration of Australia Day.Nationally, Australia Day was originally celebrated on 30 July 1915. 26 January was chosen because it is the day of the establishment of the first British settlement at Port Jackson by Captain Arthur Phillip in 1788. It was made a public holiday in New South Wales in 1836, and Victoria adopted the day as a public holiday in 1931. The 26 January commenced to be recognised by all states and territories as Australia Day in 1935 (pre 150th Anniversary) and all States except SA observed it from the 1888 centenary.

Australia Day has been celebrated as a national public holiday on 26 January since 1994.

Since 1960, the winner of the Australian of the Year award is announced by the Prime Minister on the eve of Australia Day (25 January).

=== Labour Day ===
Labour Day commemorates the achievements of the Australian labour movement. The celebration of Labour Day has its origins in the eight-hour day movement, which advocated eight hours for work, eight hours for recreation, and eight hours for rest. On 21 April 1856 Stonemasons and building workers on building sites around Melbourne, Australia, stopped work and marched from the University of Melbourne to Parliament House to achieve an eight-hour day. Their direct action protest was a success, and they are noted as the first organised workers in the world to achieve an eight-hour day with no loss of pay, which subsequently inspired the celebration of Labour Day and May Day. In Tasmania the public holiday is called Eight Hours Day and in the Northern Territory it is called May Day.

The Labour Day public holiday varies considerably between the various states and territories. It is the first Monday in October in the Australian Capital Territory, New South Wales and South Australia. In Western Australia, it is the first Monday in March. In both Victoria and Tasmania, it is the second Monday in March. In the Northern Territory, and in Queensland it is the first Monday in May.

=== Easter ===
The days of Easter vary each year depending on the day determined by the Western Christian calendar. Until 1994 Easter Tuesday was a Bank Holiday in Victoria (it retains this status partially in Tasmania). The day after Good Friday and before Easter Sunday is traditionally known as Holy Saturday. However, the states where that day is a public holiday use different terminology – it is officially gazetted as "Easter Saturday" in the ACT, New South Wales, the Northern Territory and South Australia, as "the day after Good Friday" in Queensland, and as "Saturday before Easter Sunday" in Victoria.

=== Anzac Day ===
Anzac Day is a day on which the country remembers those citizens who fell fighting or who served the country in wars. ANZAC Day is commemorated on 25 April every year. The tradition began to remember the Australian and New Zealand Army Corps (ANZAC) soldiers who landed at Gallipoli in Turkey during World War I.

Anzac Day commemoration features marches by veterans and by solemn "Dawn Services", a tradition started in Albany, Western Australia on 25 April 1923 and now held at war memorials around the country, accompanied by thoughts of those lost at war to the ceremonial sounds of The Last Post on the bugle. The fourth stanza of Laurence Binyon's poem For the Fallen (known as the "Ode of Remembrance") is often recited.

=== King's Birthday ===
In all states and territories except Queensland and Western Australia, the King's Birthday is observed on the second Monday in June. Because Western Australia celebrates Western Australia Day (formerly Foundation Day) on the first Monday in June, the Governor of Western Australia proclaims the day on which the state will observe the King's Birthday, based on school terms and the Perth Royal Show. There is no firm rule to determine this date before it is proclaimed, though it is typically the last Monday of September or the first Monday of October: in 2011 the King's Birthday holiday in Western Australia was moved from Monday, 3 October 2011 to Friday, 28 October 2011 to coincide with the Commonwealth Heads of Government Meeting (CHOGM), which was held in Perth. In parts of the Pilbara, it is celebrated on a different date from the rest of Western Australia, and it may even be celebrated on different dates in different parts of the Pilbara. In Queensland, it is celebrated on the 1st Monday in October.

The day has been celebrated since 1788, when Governor Arthur Phillip declared a holiday to mark the birthday of King George III. Until 1936 it was held on the actual birthday of the Monarch, but after the death of King George V, it was decided to keep the date at mid-year.

On that day the "King's Birthday honours list" is released naming new members of the Order of Australia and other Australian honours. This occurs on the date observed in the Eastern States, not the date observed in Western Australia.

The King's Birthday weekend and Empire Day, 24 May, were long the traditional times for public fireworks displays in Australia. Although they still occur, the tradition has recently been overshadowed by larger New Year's Eve fireworks, as the sale of fireworks to the public was banned by the states in the 1980s, and in the ACT as of 24 August 2009. In the Northern Territory fireworks remain available to the public on 1 July for the celebration of Territory Day.

=== Christmas Day ===
Christmas is observed on 25 December each year to commemorate the birth of Jesus. In Australia, it was introduced with British settlement in 1788 as the cultural norms were transferred to the new colonies.

=== Boxing Day ===
Boxing Day is on the day after Christmas, i.e. 26 December each year, except in South Australia where it is replaced by Proclamation Day.

Boxing Day is noted for the start of the post-Christmas sale season. The day has also become a significant sporting day. Melbourne hosts the Boxing Day Test match; the Sydney to Hobart Yacht Race also starts on this day.

== Other holidays ==
- Every public holiday and Sunday is a bank holiday in South Australia.
- Proclamation Day is in December in South Australia only.
- Canberra Day is held on the 2nd Monday in March in the ACT. Prior to 2008, this holiday was celebrated on the 3rd Monday of March.
- Melbourne Cup Day is held on the first Tuesday of November—the day of the Melbourne Cup. It was originally observed only in the Melbourne metropolitan area. From 2007 to 2009 in ACT, Melbourne Cup day was also a holiday called "Family and Community Day". The holiday continued from 2010 to 2017 but no longer coincided with Melbourne Cup day. In Victoria, the Public Holidays Act 1993 (Vic) was amended from 24 September 2008 and made the Melbourne Cup Day holiday applicable in all parts of the state (unless another day is observed in substitute). It also made the holiday applicable to employees covered by federal awards.
- Recreation Day is the first Monday of November, and celebrated in Northern Tasmania where Regatta Day is not a holiday.
- Regatta Day is the second Monday in February, and is celebrated in Southern Tasmania. Previously it was held on the second Tuesday in February.
- Geelong Cup Day is held on the fourth Wednesday of October in the city of Geelong, Victoria
- Queensland Day is celebrated on 6 June each year, but not with a public holiday.
- Adelaide Cup Day is held on the second Monday in March in South Australia (formerly held on the third Monday of May prior to 2006)
- Western Australia Day in Western Australia on the first Monday in June.
- Picnic Day in the Northern Territory in August, and also May Day.
- Tasmania has Easter Tuesday as a bank holiday (for bank and government employees only).
- New South Wales has the first Monday in August as a bank holiday (for bank employees only).
- Many cities and towns observe local public holidays for their local Agricultural Show. For example:
  - Darwin Show Day in Darwin area in late July
  - Royal Queensland Show Day in Brisbane area in August
  - Gold Coast Show in Gold Coast area in October
  - Territory Day celebrated in the Northern Territory on 1 July while not a designated public holiday, it remains the only Australian public celebration where the public may purchase fireworks for home detonation
- "National Day of Mourning for Her Majesty Queen Elizabeth II" was a "one off" national public holiday declared by the Prime Minister for 22 September 2022 to allow people to pay their respects for the death of Queen Elizabeth II, the longest-reigning Australian monarch.

== Public holidays by state ==
=== Queensland ===
The days are set in the Holidays Act 1983. Most public holidays include a second public holiday on a week-day if they happen to fall on Saturday or Sunday. In which case, both days are public holidays.

- New Year's Day: 1 January, or if 1 January is a Saturday or Sunday, the following Monday.
- Australia Day: 26 January, or if 26 January is a Saturday or Sunday, the following Monday.
- Good Friday: on the date it is publicly observed, always a Friday.
- The day after Good Friday: Always a Saturday, one day after Good Friday.
- Easter Monday: The next Monday after Good Friday.
- Anzac Day: 25 April, or if 25 April is a Sunday, 26 April.
- Labour Day ("May Day"): 1st Monday in May.
- King's/Queen's Birthday: 1st Monday in October. (legislated as the "Birthday of the Sovereign")
- Christmas Day: 25 December.
- Boxing Day: 26 December.

If Christmas Day (25 December) is a Saturday or Sunday, then 27 December is also a public holiday. If Boxing day (26 December) is a Saturday or Sunday, then 28 December is also a public holiday.

Because of the variable days of Easter, Anzac day could fall on an Easter holiday. When Anzac day falls on a Saturday, there is no week day public holiday. In such situations it is generally expected that the minister will proclaim extra public holidays on week-days to ensure every year has the same number of public holidays on week-days.

The minister of the state may proclaim and adjustments or additions, such as the date of the Brisbane Ekka Show day holiday. This day has historically always been proclaimed for the second Wednesday in August, except if there are five Wednesdays in August, in which case it is the third Wednesday in August.

=== New South Wales ===
Public holidays generally follow the national pattern, but special cases are resolved by the State Government and advised by proclamation. Details of future holidays can be found on the NSW Industrial Relations website. Public holidays are regulated by the New South Wales Public Holidays Act 2010 No 115, which supersedes the Banks and Bank Holidays Act 1912 No 43.

The first Monday in August is a Bank Holiday, during which banks and financial institutions are closed.

=== Australian Capital Territory and Jervis Bay Territory ===
Most New South Wales public holidays are public holidays in the Australian Capital Territory, with the addition of Canberra Day (which, since 2007, has fallen on the second Monday of March) and Reconciliation Day, which holiday falls on the Monday closest to 27 May.

=== South Australia ===
Public holidays in South Australia are provided by the Public Holidays Act 2023, assented on 7 December 2023, which repealed the Holidays Act 1910. The following days are fixed as public holidays each year:

- 1 January (New Year's Day); if New Year's Day falls on a Saturday or a Sunday, the following Monday will be a public holiday in addition to that day.
- 26 January (Australia Day); if Australia Day falls on a Saturday or a Sunday, the following Monday will be a public holiday instead of that day.
- The second Monday in March (Adelaide Cup Day)
- The Friday publicly observed as Good Friday (Good Friday)
- The day after Good Friday (Easter Saturday)
- The Sunday following Good Friday (Easter Sunday)
- The Monday following Good Friday (Easter Monday)
- 25 April (Anzac Day)
- The second Monday in June (King's Official Birthday)
- The first Monday in October (Labour Day)
- 24 December (Christmas Eve); Christmas Eve is a part-day public holiday from 7pm until midnight.
- 25 December (Christmas Day); if Christmas Day falls on a Saturday or a Sunday, the following Monday will be a public holiday in addition to that day.
- 26 December (Proclamation Day); if Proclamation Day falls on a Saturday, the following Monday will be a public holiday in addition to that day. If it falls on a Sunday or a Monday, the following Tuesday will be a public holiday as well.
- 31 December (New Year's Eve); New Year's Eve is a part-day public holiday from 7pm until midnight.

The Governor may declare some other day to be a public holiday instead of a day listed. The Governor may also appoint a day to be an additional public holiday or part-day public holiday throughout the State, or within a locality specified within the proclamation.

=== Victoria ===
Public holidays in Victoria are regulated by the Victorian Public Holidays Act 1993.

Victorian employees fall under the Workchoices system either as coming within the Commonwealth constitutional power (called "constitutional corporation employees") or because of Victoria's referral of its legislative powers to the Commonwealth for particular workplace relations matters.

Employee entitlements to public holidays and additional pay depend on whether they are covered by a federal award or agreement.

Employees not covered by a federal award or agreement are entitled to public holidays under the Victorian Public Holidays Act 1993. Also, all permanent employees not covered by a federal award or agreement who would normally work on a public holiday (or a substitute public holiday) are entitled to the holiday without loss of pay. Their employers are not required to provide additional payment if they work on a public holiday, but this does not exclude the possibility of employees and employers negotiating for additional pay.

Employees who are covered by a federal award or agreement are entitled to public holidays as provided by the relevant federal award or agreement and the Public Holidays Act 1993. Many federal awards and agreements also provide for additional penalty rates for work performed on a public holiday.

Restricted shop trading laws apply to Good Friday, Christmas Day and before 1 pm on Anzac Day. On these days only exempted businesses are permitted to open for trading. All public holidays and substitute public holidays are bank holidays.

In August 2015, the day before the AFL Grand Final, as well as Easter Sunday, were gazetted as Public Holidays within Victoria. The date of this holiday is as gazetted by the Victorian Government and cannot be accurately predicted. In 2019, the Victorian Parliament legislated the AFL Grand Final public holiday by amending the Public Holidays Act 1993 (Vic).

The Victorian public holidays are as follows:

Name	Date
New Year's Day	1 January
Australia Day	26 January
Labour Day	2nd Monday in March
Good Friday	Friday before Easter
Saturday before Easter Sunday	Day before Easter
Easter Sunday	Day of Easter
Easter Monday	Day after Easter
ANZAC Day	25 April
King's Birthday	2nd Monday in June
Friday before the AFL Grand Final	Variable date (usually late September/early October)
Melbourne Cup Day	1st Tuesday of November*
Christmas Day	25 December
Boxing Day	26 December

* Melbourne Cup Day is observed in most of the state, but various cup days and show days in the state's west are locally substituted. See the list at Non-Metropolitan Public Holiday Dates (Victoria Online).

Melbourne Show Day used to be observed on the Thursday in the last full week of September as a half-day public holiday—later changing to full day—until 1994 (abolished by the state government). Easter Tuesday was observed as a Bank Holiday in Victoria until 1994 (also abolished by the state government).

=== Western Australia ===
Name	Date
New Year's Day	1 January *
Australia Day	26 January +
Labour Day	1st Monday in March
Good Friday	Friday before Easter
Easter Monday	Day after Easter
Anzac Day	25 April *
Western Australia Day	First Monday in June
King's Birthday	Last Monday of September #
Christmas	25 December *
Boxing Day	26 December *

- *If a public holiday falls on a Saturday or Sunday, the following Monday is also observed as a public holiday
- #The King's Birthday may be held on a different date in regional communities
- +If Australia Day falls on a Saturday or Sunday, the following Monday becomes the public holiday

In September 2025 the Cook government announced its intention to introduce two new public holidays and move three others to align with dates in other states from 2028. Easter Saturday would be introduced on the day before Easter Sunday and Perth Royal Show day on the first Monday of the September / October school holidays. Labour Day would move to the second Monday in March. During state election years it would move to the third Monday in March to avoid holding an election on a long weekend. The King's Birthday public holiday would move to the second Monday in June and Western Australia Day to the second Monday in November.

== Penalty rates ==
Penalty rates are the rates of pay which an employee is paid higher than their standard base rate for working at times or on days, such as public holidays, which are outside the normal working week. They were introduced in 1947 for workers working on the Sabbath, as most workers were Christian, while today, these rates of pay are set by the Fair Work Commission.

== See also ==
- Australian labour law
- Australian Pay and Classification Scales
