= Queensland Day =

Australian holiday commemorating the establishment of Queensland (6 June 1859)

- Observed by: Queensland
- Type: Public
- Date: 6 June
- Frequency: Annual

Queensland Day is officially celebrated on 6 June as the birthday of the Australian state of Queensland.

== History ==
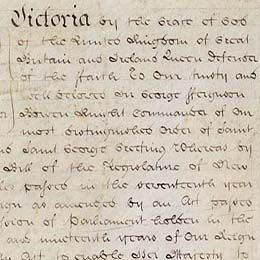
Detail from Letters Patent establishing the Colony of Queensland.

Moves towards statehood began with a public meeting in 1851 to consider separation of Queensland from the Colony of New South Wales. As the push for separation gained momentum, Queen Victoria was approached to consider establishing a separate colony based at Moreton Bay. The Queen gave her approval and signed the Letters Patent on 6 June 1859. On the same day an Order-in-Council gave Queensland its own Constitution. Queensland became a self-governing colony with its own Governor, a nominated Legislative Council and an elected Legislative Assembly.

With the word 'Separation' painted on its hull, the ship Clarence sailed into Brisbane on 10 July 1859, to be greeted by a jubilant crowd eagerly awaiting the news of separation. Clarence was welcomed with a 14-gun salute, a 'blue light' display and fireworks.

On 10 December 1859, Governor Bowen arrived in Brisbane to a civic reception in the Botanic Gardens. He officially marked the historic occasion of Separation by reading a proclamation from the verandah of the Deanery of St. John's Cathedral.

== The Sunshine State ==
The song, The Sunshine State, by prolific Queensland composer Clyde Collins was written for the centenary of Queensland in 1959. It is still performed regularly by bands and choirs, especially on Queensland Day. Songwriter, harmonicist and clarinettist Horrie Dargie (1917–1999) recorded the song in 1959 with the famous Horrie Dargie Quintet. The quintet’s farewell concert in Sydney Town Hall before their tour of England (1952) became Australia’s first Gold Record, selling 75,000 copies.

== Queensland Greats Awards ==
Since 2001, the Queensland Greats Awards have been presented as part of Queensland Day celebrations. These awards recognise outstanding Queenslanders for their lifetime of dedication and contribution to the development of the state and their role in strengthening and shaping the community. A posthumous category was added in 2015 and from 2016, an institution has been acknowledged annually.

== See also ==
- Canberra Day
- History of Queensland
- Proclamation Day
- Western Australia Day
