= Manners Creek Station =

Pastoral lease and cattle station in Northern Territory

Coordinates: 22.11026°S 137.98083°E

Location in the Northern Territory

Manners Creek Station is a pastoral lease that operates as a cattle station in the Northern Territory of Australia.

It is situated about 125 kilometres (78 mi) south of Alpurrurulam and 256 kilometres (159 mi) north east of Alice Springs. The property shares a boundary with Lucy Creek and Tarlton Downs to the west, Argadargada and Lake Nash Station to the north, Marqua and Tobermorey to the south and the border with Queensland to the east. Manners Creek, from which the station takes its name, flows through the property at the north eastern end. The Plenty Highway almost bisects the property from west to east.

The lease is just under 8,090 square kilometres (3,124 sq mi).

The owner in 2000 was Laurie Facer, who put it up for auction along with 8,000 head of Brahman cross cattle. It was passed in at A$5.1 million to Nick Isak. In 2011 the area was plagued by the largest bushfires that had been seen there since the 1970s; some 200,000 acres (80,937 ha) of neighbouring Marqua Station was burnt out.

== See also ==
- List of ranches and stations
