= Tobermorey =

Pastoral lease in the Northern Territory

Coordinates: 22.274°S 137.974°E

Location in Northern Territory

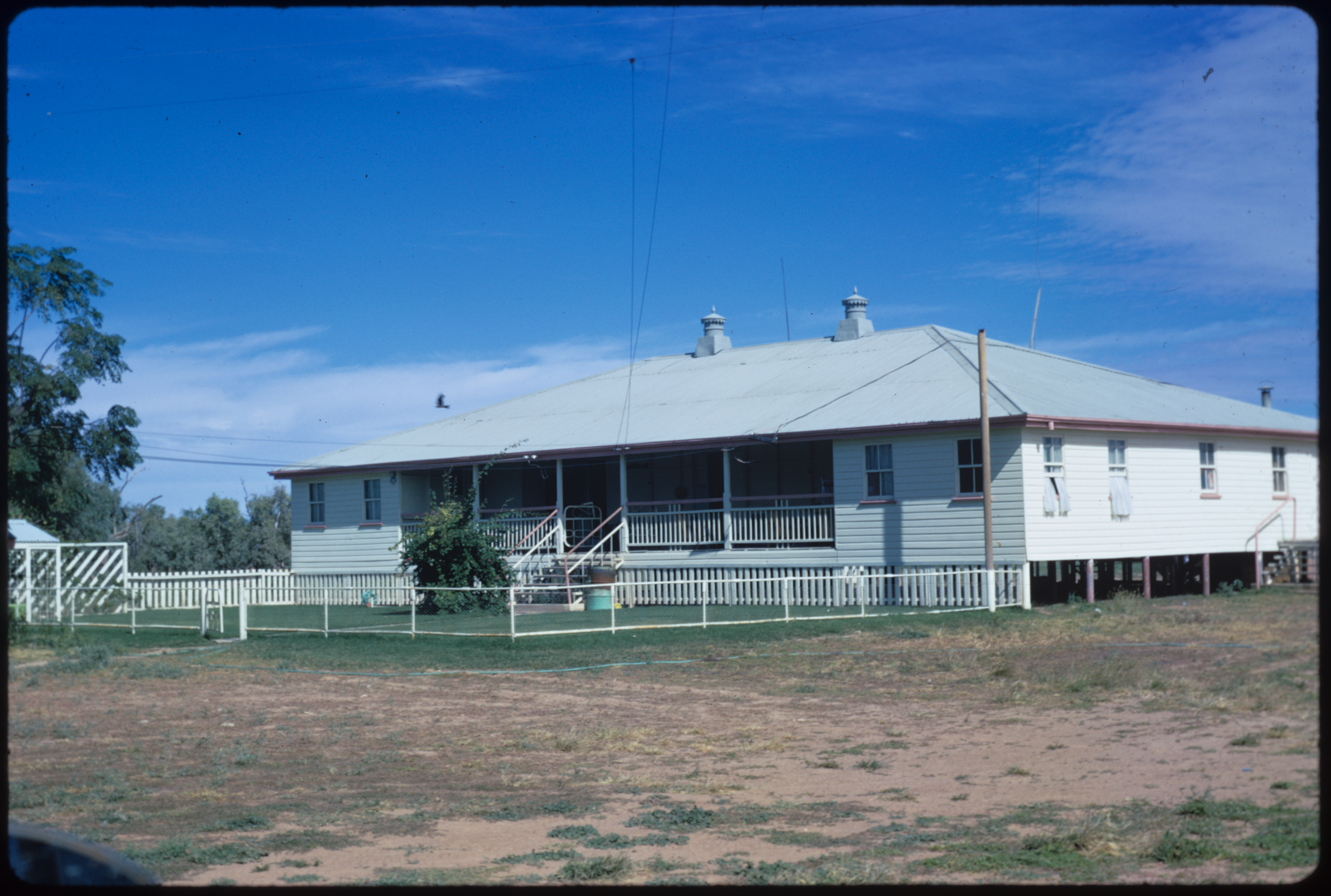
The Tobermorey homestead in 1973

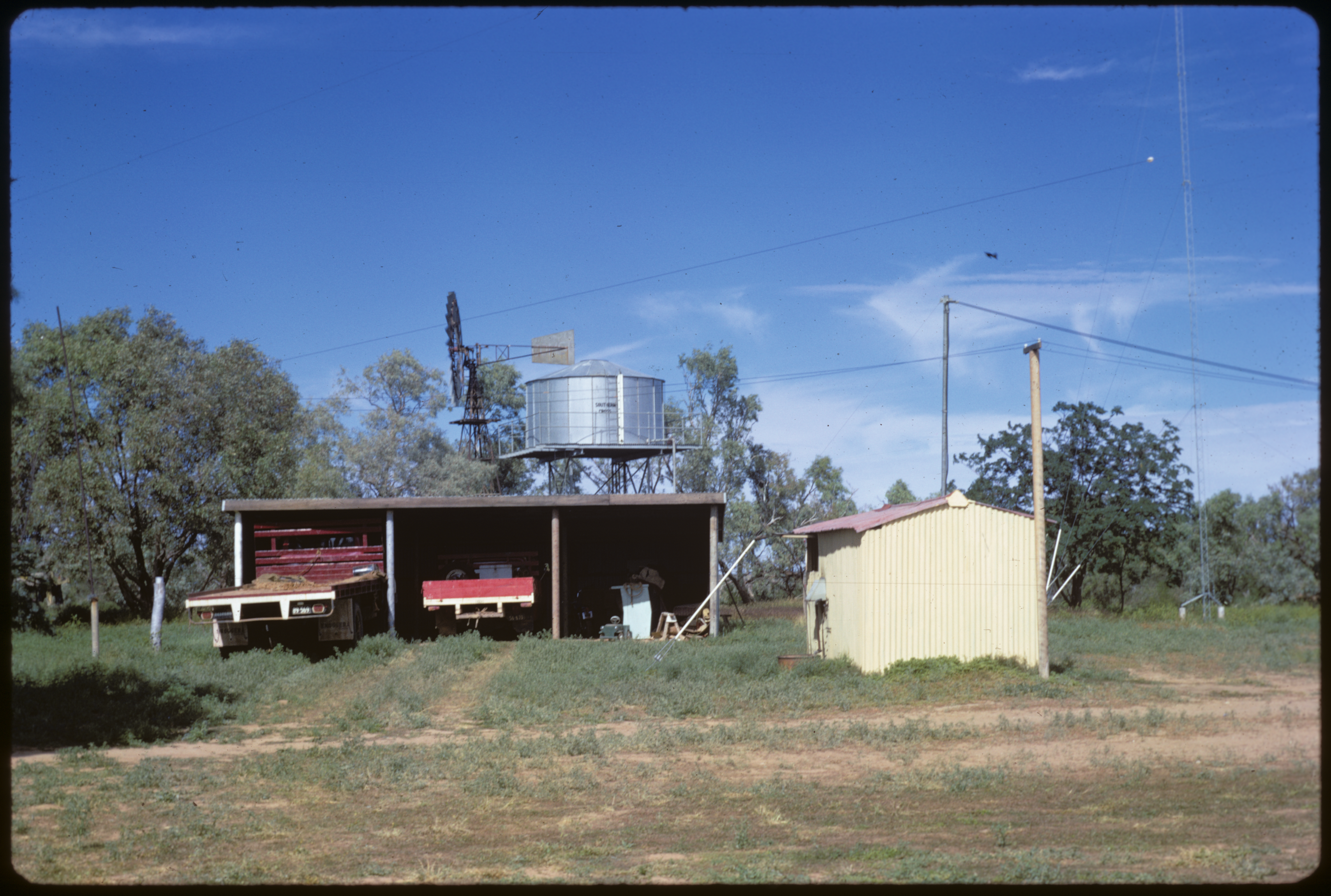
Station outbuildings in 1973

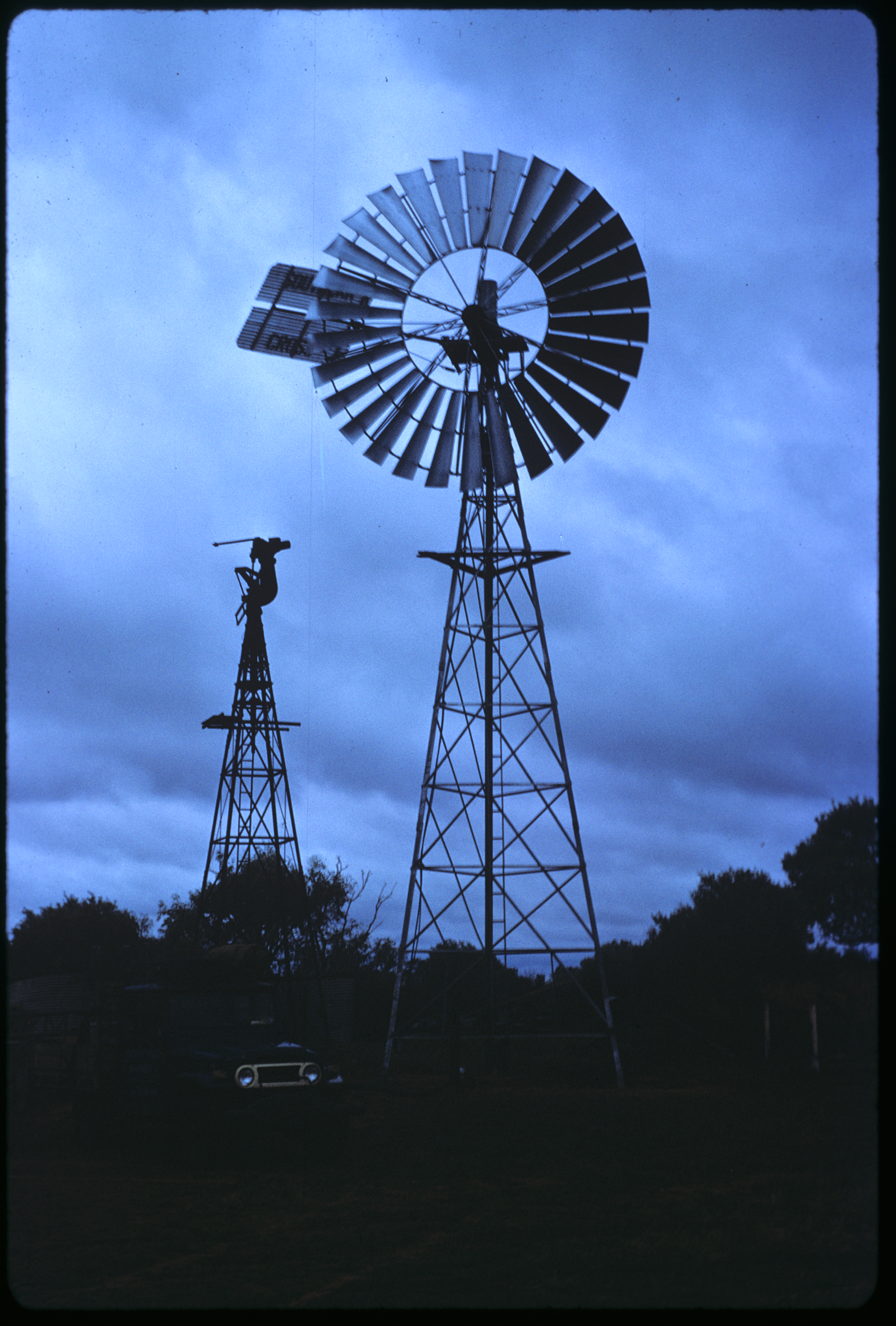
A new windmill when installed there in 1973

Tobermorey Station is a pastoral lease that operates as a cattle station in the Alice Springs region of the Northern Territory. Tobermorey is on the western edge of Punthamara territory

== Location ==
The property is situated approximately 143 kilometres (89 mi) east of Alpurrurulam in the Northern Territory and 233 kilometres (145 mi) west of Mount Isa in Queensland. The property is bounded to the north by Manners Creek Station, to the west by Marqua Station, to the west and south by Atnetye Aboriginal Land Trust and to the east by the Queensland border. Several watercourses flow through the property including Field River, Manners Creek and Marqua Creek. The Plenty Highway passes through the northern end of the station near to the homestead.

== Description ==
Capable of carrying approximately 15,000 head of cattle, Tobermorey occupies an area of 5,994 square kilometres (2,314 sq mi); it is approximately 180 kilometres (112 mi) in length and 40 kilometres (25 mi) wide. The southern portion of Tobermorey is red soil with areas of sandhills, lightly timbered and supporting areas of buffel grass around the watercourses. The northern section is open plain country timbered with Mulga and gidyea and covered with Mitchell grass and other herbage.

== Facilities ==
The Tobermorey Station Roadhouse & Caravan Park is a unique tourist facility located adjacent to the property buildings. The Roadhouse sells both unleaded and diesel petroleum and has a store stocked with a small variety of small goods, food & snacks, souvenirs, tyre repairs. The caravan park provides unpowered campsites, cabin and room accommodation, camp kitchen, playground and a licensed bar for motorists heading west along Plenty Highway towards the Stuart Highway, and those heading east into Queensland via the Donohue Highway. The Roadhouse and Caravan Park close for the summer wet season annually from December through to March

== History ==
Cattle belonging to Robert Anderson have been grazing on the lands since 1910. Anderson, who was previously a shopkeeper at Urandangie, moved to the area in 1913 to establish Tobermorey.

Severe bushfires hit the area in 1952 and by 1954 the property was in the grip of drought, with the Andersons preparing to ship their breeding stock from the property. The Anderson family sold the property in the 1980s.

In 2009 the property was owned by Sterling Buntine, who had placed it up for auction; it was passed in at A$11 million. By 2011 Tobermorey had been sold along with Linda Downs for A$17.5 million. The current owners of the property are John and Margaret Speed.

== See also ==
- List of ranches and stations
- List of the largest stations in Australia
