= Recreation Day holiday =

Public holiday in Tasmania, Australia

Recreation Day
- Observed by: Tasmania
- Type: Northern Tasmania holiday
- Date: First Monday in November
- 2024 date: November 4
- 2025 date: November 3
- 2026 date: November 2
- 2027 date: November 1
- Frequency: annual

Recreation Day is a public holiday in northern Tasmania. It is held on the first Monday in November, and was instituted to compensate northern Tasmanians in place of Regatta Day, which is celebrated in southern Tasmania. It is observed in all parts of Tasmania north of (but not including) Oatlands and Swansea . This area includes Strathgordon, Tarraleah and the West Coast.

The holiday was originally established as The First Monday in November holiday through the Bank Holidays Act (1919) of Tasmania. This holiday was removed in 1989, and then reinstated as Recreation Day in 1991, to coincide with the final day of the Australian Pacing Championship. This decision of the Government was proclaimed in the Government Gazette on Wednesday 18 September 1991.
