= The Skinny =

The Skinny may refer to:

- The Skinny (magazine), a Scottish magazine
- The Skinny (film), a 2012 American romantic comedy-drama
- The Skinny (TV series), a 2016 American web series
- The Skinny (album), an album by Slimm Calhoun
- "The Skinny", a segment on World News Now

== See also ==
- Skinny (disambiguation)
- Skinny dip (disambiguation)
