= Mount Palmer (Northern Territory) =

Mountain in Australia

- Location within Northern Territory

Highest point
- Elevation: 1,117 m (3,665 ft)AHD
- Coordinates: 23°04′S 134°57′E

Geography
- Location: Hart Range, Northern Territory, Australia

Mount Palmer is a mountain with an elevation of 1,117 metres (3,665 ft) AHD in the southern part of the Northern Territory of Australia. It is part of the Central Desert Region and was named by the explorer Ernest Giles.

Mount Palmer is part of the Central Harts Range, and is known for being the site of mica mining in the past. Nearby settlements include Hart Range.

== See also ==
- List of mountains of the Northern Territory
