= Sandover Highway =

Road in the Northern Territory, Australia

Sandover Highway Northern Territory
- Map of central Australia with Sandover Highway (State Route 14) highlighted in red
- Coordinates: 22°58′S 133°50′E (Southwest end); 20°58′S 137°55′E (Northeast end)

General information
- Type: Track
- Length: 561 km (349 mi)
- Route number(s): State Route 14

Major junctions
- Southwest end: Plenty Highway
- Northeast end: Alpurrurulam, NT/Qld Border

Restrictions
- Fuel supply: Arlparra (22°13′S 134°33′E); Ammaroo Station (21°45′S 135°14′E)
- Facilities: Arlparra, Ammaroo Station

The Sandover Highway is an outback unsealed track in the Northern Territory between the Plenty Highway north of Alice Springs and the Northern Territory/Queensland border.

== Description ==
The highway's name is derived from the Sandover River because its alignment follows that of the river.

At its western end the road branches north from the Plenty Highway 27 kilometres (17 mi) east of the Stuart Highway. Its total length is 561 kilometres (349 mi) and it passes through semi-arid spinifex deserts and blacksoil Mitchell grass plains. The designated highway finishes just east of Alpurrurulam at the Northern Territory/Queensland border, but the track continues into Queensland for 55 kilometres (34 mi) where it joins the Camooweal Urandangi Road, which runs north to Camooweal.

== Accessibility ==
The track crosses Urapuntja lands, which is an Aboriginal homelands area. No permits are needed to travel on the track; however, they are necessary for travellers wishing to visit Aboriginal communities off-track.

Although the first part of the track can be negotiated by conventional vehicles, use of a four-wheel drive vehicle is recommended after Ammaroo. Each year the wet season floods the black soil plains at the eastern end of the Sandover Highway and Alpurrurulam and Lake Nash become completely inaccessible, even to four-wheel drive vehicles. Flooding can also occur after brief but heavy thunderstorms during the dry season.

== Stations and fuel ==
Ammaroo Station has a shop with basic supplies. Fuel is available but there are no camping facilities. Another fuel supply along the track can be found at Arlparra.

Woodgreen Station, also known as Atartinga, covers approximately 2,215 km^{2} (855 sq mi), and is located around 140 km (87 mi) north of Alice Springs on the Sandover Highway.

== See also ==
- Highways in Australia
- List of highways in the Northern Territory
