= Donohue Highway =

Track in Queensland and the Northern Territory

Donohue Highway Queensland–Northern Territory
- Donohue Highway (depicted in blue and white)

General information
- Type: Track
- Length: 249 km (155 mi)

Major junctions
- West end: Plenty Highway (State Route 12), Tobermorey Homestead, Northern Territory (near NT/Qld Border)
- East end: Diamantina Developmental Road (National Route 83), near Boulia, Queensland

The Donohue Highway is a 249 km (155 mi) mostly unpaved outback track that leads through the northern foothills of the Simpson Desert in Queensland to Tobermorey Homestead, Northern Territory near the Northern Territory/Queensland border in Australia.

The road branches from the Diamantina Developmental Road 7 km (4 mi) north-west of Boulia and proceeds towards the Northern Territory. The Georgina River is at about the 166 km mark and 83 km further is Tobermorey, a town with 20 inhabitants. From here the trail continues as the Plenty Highway towards Alice Springs. The route is mostly unpaved and marked by corrugations, deep potholes and bulldust (fine red desert dust). However, in 2009 further development in the form of river crossings were initially attached and further parts of the road are paved. Despite the improvements to the track, it is often impassable after heavy rain.

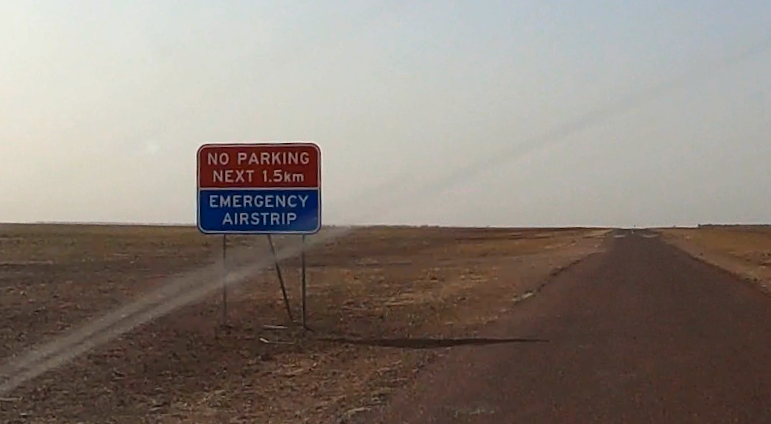
Donohue Highway Emergency Airstrip sign

In 2016 a section of the road was widened to add a passing lane and to act as an emergency landing strip for the Royal Flying Doctor Service.

The Donohue Highway along its entire length forms part of the Outback Highway, which runs 2,800 km through central Australia.

== Upgrades ==
=== Paving and sealing ===
A project to pave and seal sections of the road, at a cost of $10.48 million, was completed in June 2021.

== Major intersections ==
This route has no major intersections.

== See also ==
- Highways in Australia
