= Hart Range, Northern Territory =

Harts Range Northern Territory
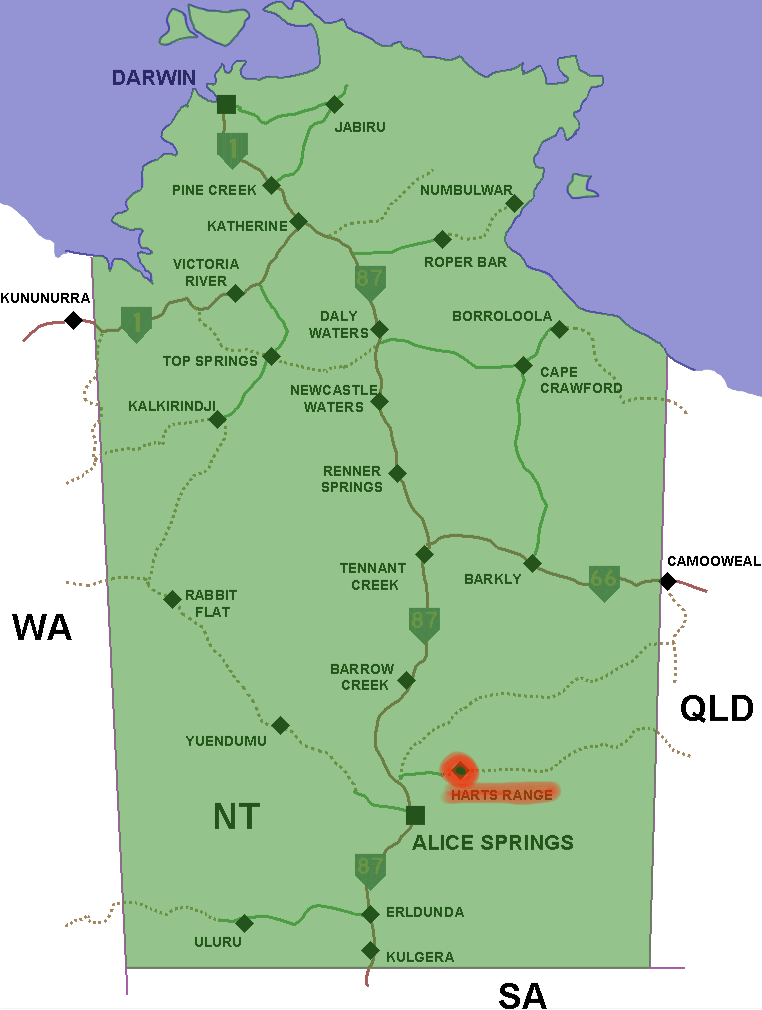
- Location in the Northern Territory (red)

- Coordinates: 22°59′12″S 134°55′15″E
- Established: 16 May 1990
- Time zone: ACST (UTC+9:30)

Harts Range, officially registered as Hart Range, is a town in the Northern Territory of Australia located on the Plenty Highway 215 km (134 mi) by road northeast of Alice Springs. It is also the name of a mountain range, after which it was named. It has also been referred to as Hart's Range. The Plenty River runs to the north of the range and the town.

== History ==
The area is rich in minerals, and from the 1880s until 1960 the Harts Range area produced most of Australia's mica and one of these mines was the Spotted tiger mine. Many of the miners who arrived after the First World War (1918) were Italian, with no experience of mining. After 1945 Italian immigration to the area increased, many of them with families. Mining occurred mainly in the Central Harts Range District, where the new migrants established settlements. The Plenty Highway and other transport services were developed as a result of these migrants' activities, and they formed the basis of Central Australia's Italian community that still exists today.

The Governor of New South Wales, Lord Wakehurst, and his wife visited the area in March 1945.

The miners used local Aboriginal people for labour and for their knowledge. A 1950 newspaper article reports the value of mineral production from Hart's Range and the Plenty River as £79,321, but said that the profits had not flowed into the miners' wages, who had only received "no wage increase (other than the phoney cost of living adjustments made each quarter) since 1947".

In 2005 the area was shortlisted as a potential site for a low-level and intermediate-level radioactive waste storage and disposal facility, raising concerns that the local hydrogeology could result in spills contaminating the ground water.

== Geology and geography ==
The basement rocks of the Harts Range group were formed in the lower to middle Proterozoic Eon, and have undergone complex metamorphic heating and deformation events. Later, in an orogenic event during the Cambrian Period, plutonic igneous activity generated magma of granitic composition, and in the final stages of crystallisation, pegmatites were intruded into the adjacent basement rocks. Although the granite pluton has not been exposed by erosion, the pegmatites which contain muscovite, or white mica, were mined for mica from the 1890s to 1960.

The former mica mines at Mount Palmer are now abandoned, and popular as a fossicking area.

== Demographics ==
Most of the town's population are of Aboriginal descent, residing in the nearby community of Atitjere.

== Recreation and events ==
Since 1947, each year an annual racing meet, the "Harts Range Races" has been held at the Harts Range Racecourse on the Picnic Day long weekend. The event has grown to include rodeo, novelty, and family events in a three-day festival.

== Facilities ==
Harts Range Police Station services the surrounding district, comprising remote cattle stations and Aboriginal communities.

A transmitter for the Jindalee Operational Radar Network is located near Harts Range.
