= Spotted tiger mine =

Mica mine in Northern Territory, Australia

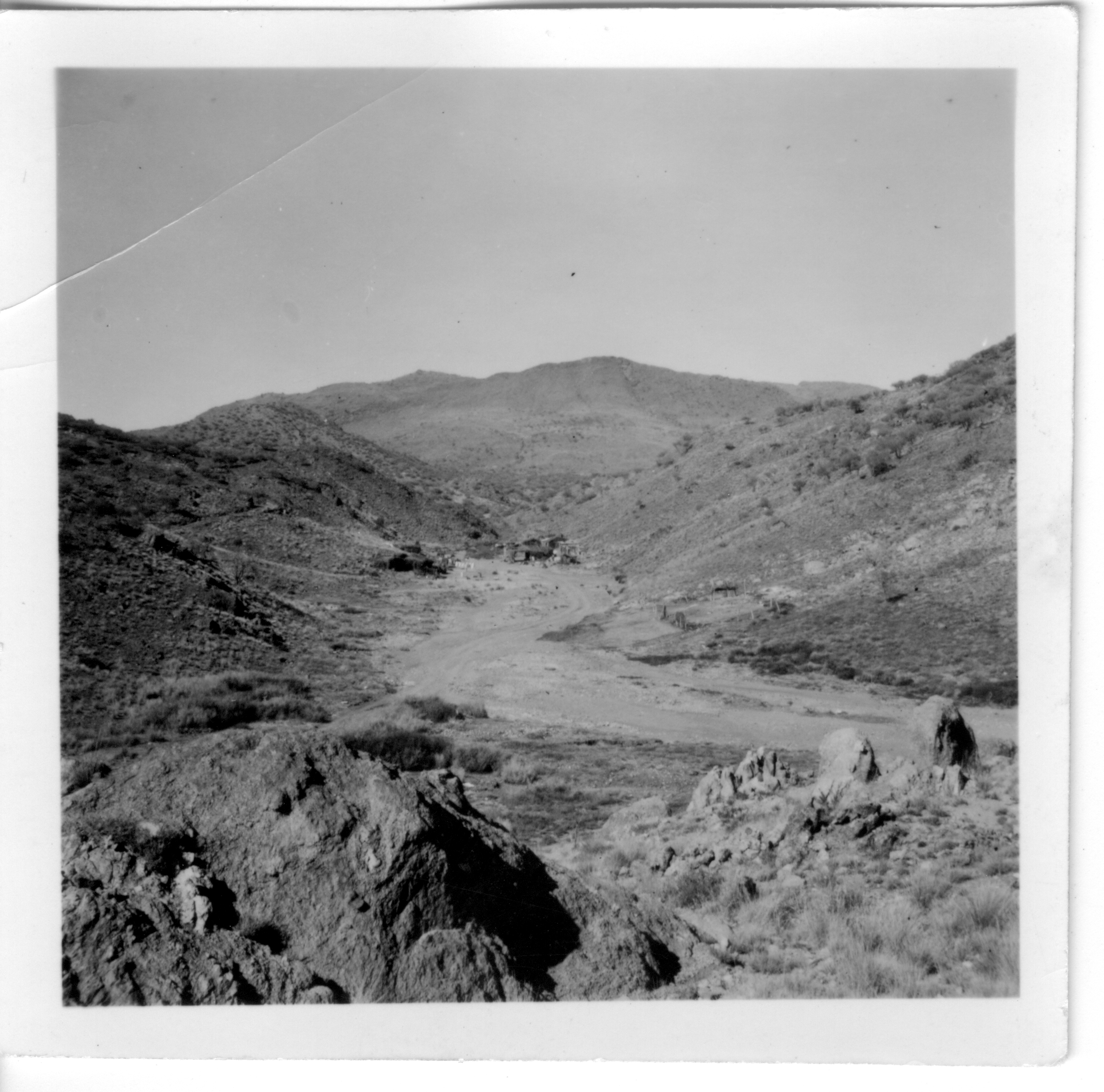
The Spotted Tiger mine in c1955

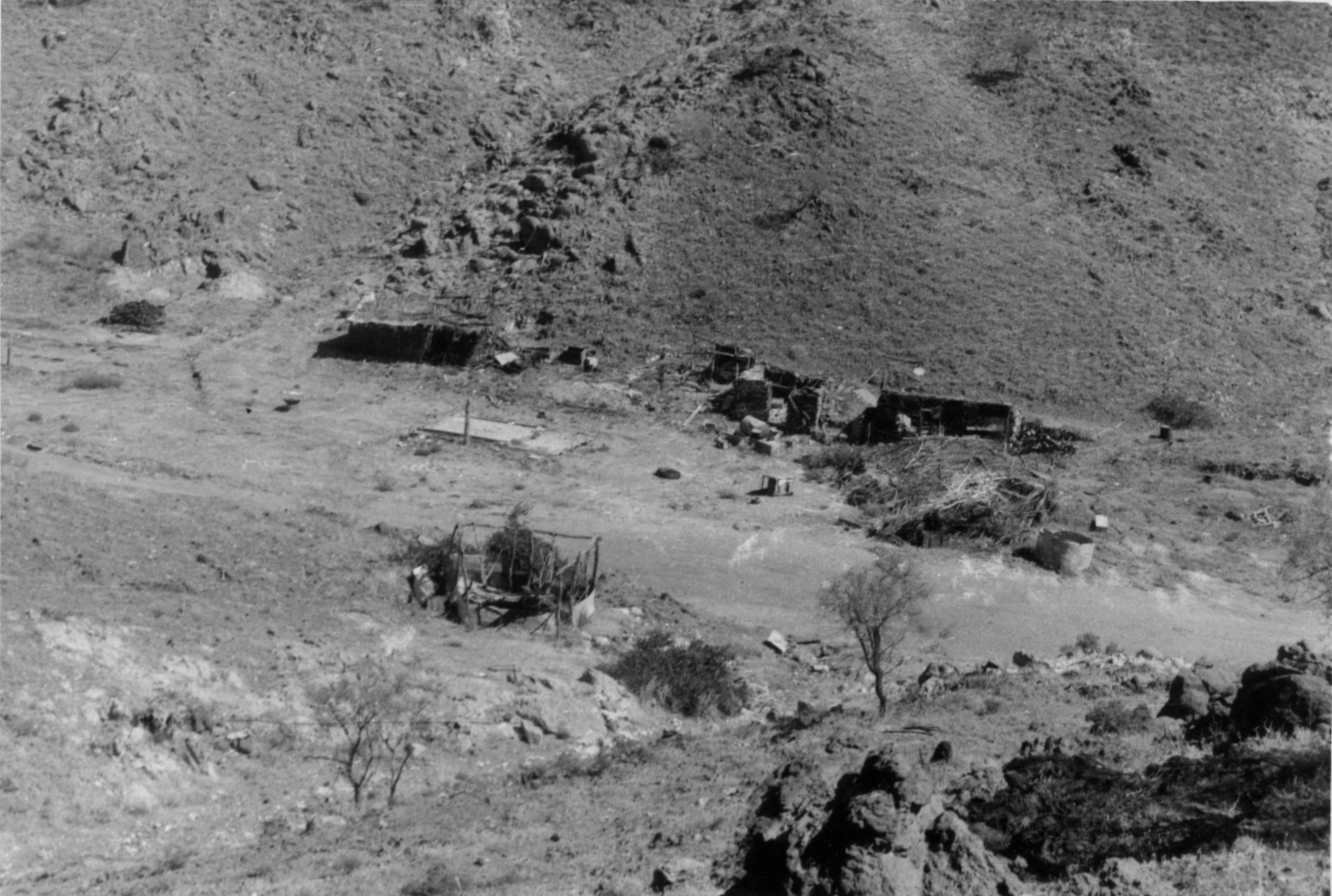
The Spotted Tiger mine in c1960s

Spotted tiger mine was a mica mine in the Harts Range area of the Northern Territory of Australia and it is now abandoned. It was once lauded the "greatest mica mine the world". The mine primarily produced muscovite, a form of white mica, although smoky quartz and garnet were also found there. It got its name from the staining of much of the mica found there which made it appear 'spotted'.

The Traditional Owners of this site are the Pwetyalaneme and Artwele peoples.

== History ==
The mine was likely first used in 1917 and one of the early owners of this mine was Bill Petrick who owned it in the lead up to World War I and it was the highest producing mine on the Harts Range field at this time.

From the late 1920s onwards syndicates of Italian miners took over many of the surrounding mines and, in 1927, Innocente Vendramini was the part owner. Vendramini had immigrated from Italy to Australia that same year and was later joined at the mine by his wife and five children who lived there with him. In the late 1930s there where eight shares in the mine shared by Italian miners.

In 1935 Spotted Tiger mine was where Gwoya Tjungurrayi was photographed by Roy Dunstan which was used as the cover of Walkabout (magazine) in September 1936 and was subsequently used on stamps and led to him being nicknamed 'One Pound Jimmy'.

Many Aboriginal people were also employed on the mines, often employed by the Italians, one of these workers, in the later 1940s and early 1950s, was Walter Smith who recalled:

That mica is in crystal 'books', and they split into sheets, sometimes big and sometimes small. But it's got to be nice and clear; it mustn't have a flaw in it ... Got to be cleaned, and rolled up in paper, and put it in a box, and the box had to be very good. All of the different sizes had to be nicely fixed up. One box belonged to the sixes... or whatever the size

— Walter Smith, Man from Arltunga: Walter Smith, Australian bushman (1986)

In addition to directly working the mines Aboriginal people were also employed in other tasks in the mine and its surrounding camps which were of equal importance; this work included herding goats and caring for camels. Evidence of this labour was later used as evidence for the Hatches Creek Land Claim in 1991-1992.

During World War II the Commonwealth Government briefly took over the mine due to the demand for mica and much of the work was done by staff from the Allied Works Council; this was similar to what was experienced at the Hatches Creek wolfram field.

Mining continued there into the 1950s and, in 1953, produced 5,000 tonnes of mica and this was the largest production of any mica mine in the area that year. It closed down in the late 1961 when the need for mica decreased and the lease was forfeited.

== Current use ==
The area nearby to the now closed mine is now formally recognised as Aboriginal land, known as Spotted Tiger Bore (Pwetyalaneme) Aboriginal Land, and part of the area is now a family outstation for some of the Traditional Owners.
