= Skinny Dipping =

Skinny dipping is a colloquial term for nude swimming.

- Skinny Dipping (song), a 2021 song by Sabrina Carpenter
- Skinny Dipping, a 2018 album by Stand Atlantic, or the title track featuring Alex Lahey

== See also ==
- Skinny dip (disambiguation)
