= Skinny =

Skinny may refer to:

== People ==
- Skinny (rapper), Saudi-American hip hop rapper
- Kyle Graham (1899–1973), American Major League Baseball pitcher
- Skinny Graham (outfielder) (1909–1967), American Major League Baseball player
- Skinny Johnson (1911–1980), American college basketball player
- Nedal Hussein (born 1977), Australian boxer
- Skinny O'Neal (1899–1981), American Major League Baseball pitcher
- Dominick Pizzonia (born 1941), New York mobster known as "Skinny Dom"
- Jack Titus (1908–1978), Australian rules football player
- Jonathan M. Wainwright (general) (1883–1953), American World War II army general and Medal of Honor recipient

== Entertainment ==
- Skinny (band), defunct British electronica/rock band
- Skinny (They Can't Get Enough), 1988 album by rap group The Skinny Boys
- "Skinny," a song by Billie Eilish from her album Hit Me Hard and Soft, 2024
- "Skinny Skinny", a song by Ashton Irwin from the 2020 album Superbloom
- Skinny (novel), 2004 debut novel of Ibi Kaslik
- Skinny Pete, a character in the American TV series Breaking Bad
- Skinnies, an alien race in the science fiction novel Starship Troopers by Robert Heinlein
- Skinny, a fictional character from the animated series Lamput

== Other uses ==
- Skinny (directing team)
- Skinny Client Control Protocol
- Skinny pig, a breed of hairless guinea pig
- Skinny, a technical trail feature found on some mountain biking trails
- Skinny Mobile, a subsidiary of Spark New Zealand

== See also ==
- The Skinny (disambiguation)
- Skinny dip (disambiguation)
- Club Skinny, a mid-1990s nightclub which gave birth to the Romo movement
