= The Garden (pastoral station) =

Pastoral lease in the Northern Territory

Coordinates: 23.283605°S 134.423476°E

Location in the Northern Territory

The Garden is a property located 117 kilometres (73 mi) north east of Alice Springs in the Northern Territory of Australia. It is run by Andy Hayes. The Hayes run Droughtmaster cattle on the 2,134-square-kilometre (824 sq mi) property.

In the 1940s a large poll shorthorn cattle herd was kept on the station.

In 1965, a portion of land was excised from the pastoral lease and was gazetted as the "Trephina Gorge Scenic Reserve". This land was renamed in 1978 as the "Trephina Gorge Nature Park".

== See also ==
- List of ranches and stations
