= Picnic horse racing =

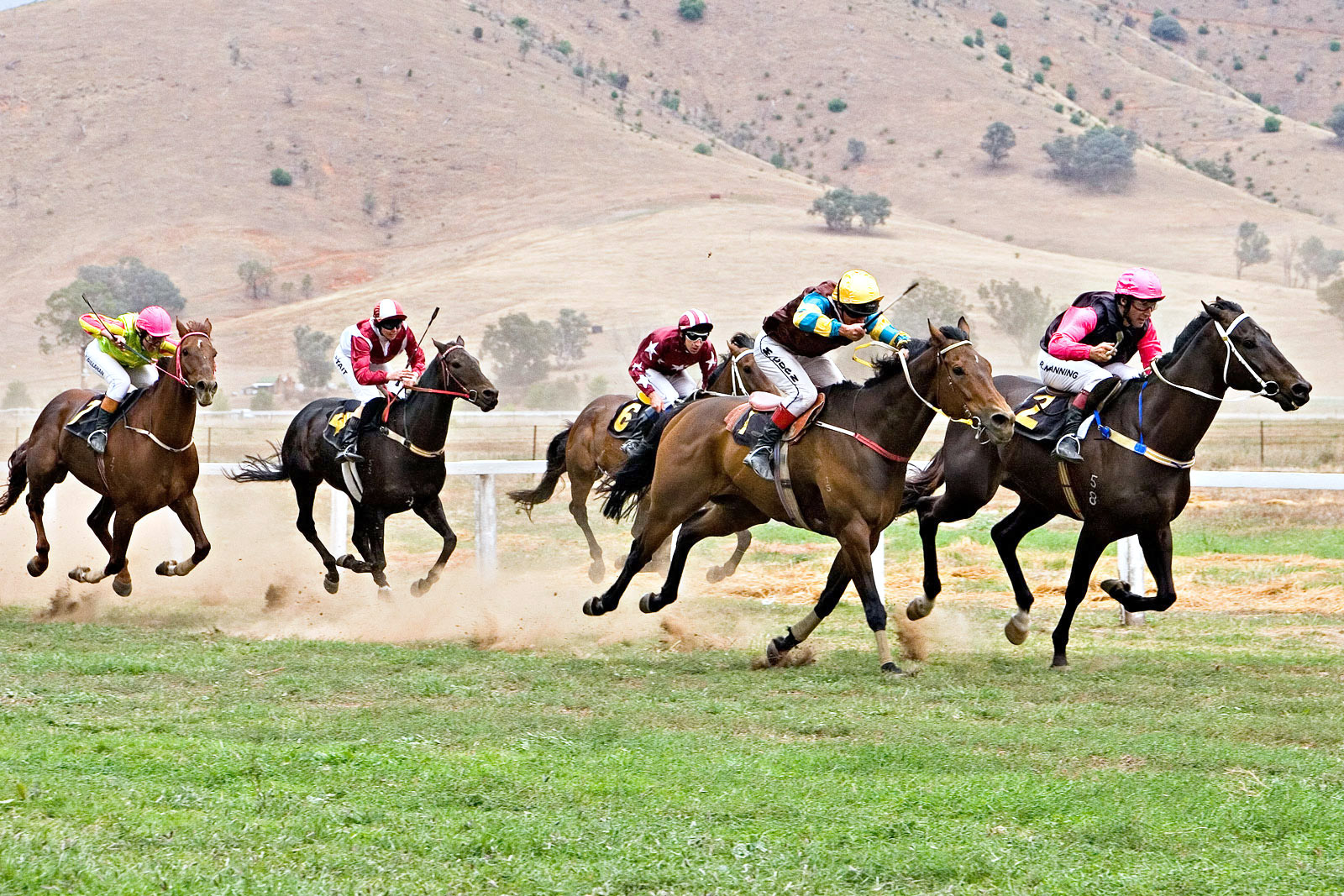
Tambo Valley Picnic Races, Victoria 2006

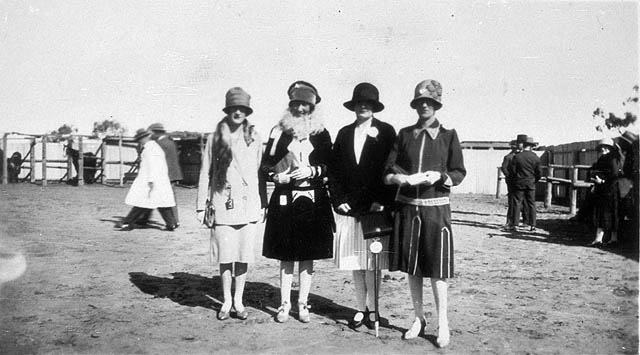
Fashions at Nyngan Picnic races, circa 1930

Picnic horse racing, or more usually picnic races or more colloquially "the picnics" refer to amateur Thoroughbred horse racing meetings, predominantly in Australia. The meetings are organised by amateur clubs, the jockeys are amateur riders, or sometimes former professional jockeys. The horses competing are generally of a standard insufficient to be competitive at professional meetings. They are often trained by hobby trainers.

The meetings are more of a social occasion and are often held on Public Holidays, or on days when major metropolitan races such as the Melbourne Cup are held.

Oakbank, South Australia holds the world’s largest picnic racing carnival during the Easter weekend.

== See also ==
- Picnic Day (Australian holiday)
