= The Skinny Dip =

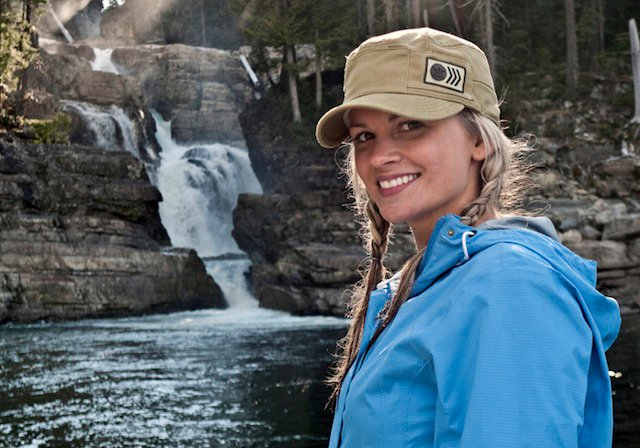
- Genre: Travel and adventure
- Created by: Best Boy Entertainment
- Directed by: Christian Sparkes
- Presented by: Eve Kelly
- Country of origin: Canada
- Original language: English
- No. of seasons: 1
- No. of episodes: 8

Production
- Executive producer: Ed Martin
- Producers: Ed Martin, Ken Pittman
- Running time: 30 minutes

Original release
- Network: Travel + Escape
- Release: 9 July 2008 – 23 December 2009

The Skinny Dip is a half-hour-long Canadian travel and adventure television series hosted by Eve Kelly, and produced by Best Boy Entertainment. The show premiered with two episodes aired together on July 9, 2008 EST on the Travel + Escape Canadian cable channel, which commissioned six new episodes, that aired in October and December 2009. All eight episodes are now available on Amazon Prime.

== Premise ==
Host Eve Kelly travels to various destinations around the world. During each show, Eve calls upon local residents and tourists to join her in a trek to a local watering hole to skinny dip. They travel by camel, dog-sled, kayak or other mode of transport on a scenic journey, showing audiences unexplored regions of each destination. Each episode caps off with a skinny dip in a beautiful and secluded swimming hole. No frontal nudity is ever shown.

== Episodes ==
1. “Corner Brook” (9 July 2008) Steady Brook Falls, Marble Mountain, Newfoundland.
2. “Brazil” (9 July 2008) Ubatuba mountains, São Paulo.
3. “Yukon” (18 Nov. 2009) icefield river polar dip, Whitehorse.
4. “Costa Rica” (25 Nov. 2009) Nauyaca Waterfalls, Dominical, Puntarenas.
5. “Australia” (2 Dec. 2009) Trephina Gorge, MacDonnell Ranges, Alice Springs.
6. “Bahamas” (9 Dec. 2009) Blue Hole, Hamilton, Long Island.
7. “British Columbia” (16 Dec. 2009) Myra Falls, Vancouver Island.
8. “New Zealand” (23 Dec. 2009) non-thermal falls near Waiotapu, Rotorua.
