= Trephina Gorge =

- Alherrkentye
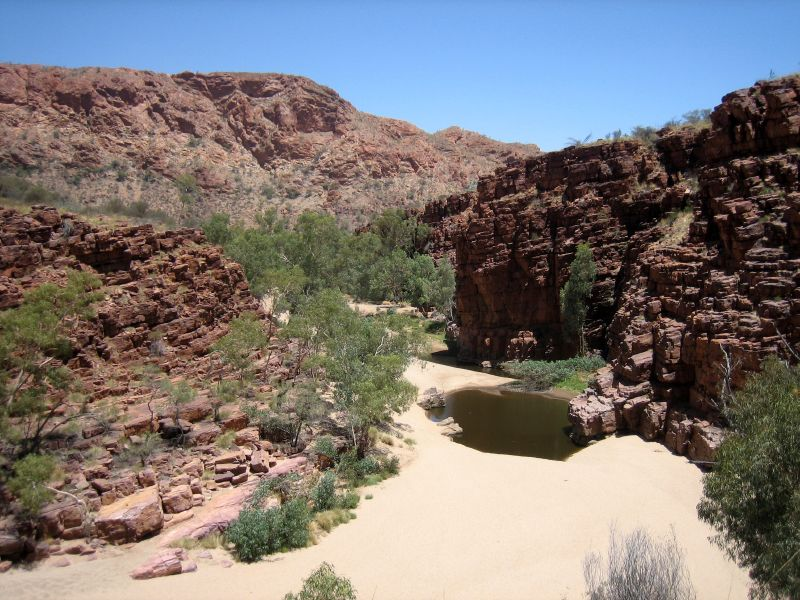

- Location within Northern Territory

Third Approach
- Location: Hart, Northern Territory
- Range: MacDonnell Ranges
- Coordinates: 23°32′00″S 134°24′00″E

Trephina Gorge (Eastern Arrernte: Alherrkentye) is a gorge in the Northern Territory of Australia located in the locality of Hart in the East MacDonnell Ranges about 85 kilometres (53 mi) east of Alice Springs.

The gorge is named after the Trephina Creek which is believed to be named after Tryphina Benstead (née Rains) who was the wife of William (Bill) Benstead, the manager of Undoolya Station from 1877 onwards and the first licensee of the Stuart Arms Hotel in Alice Springs.

Prior to August 1965, all of the gorge was located within The Garden pastoral lease. On 12 August 1965, land associated with part of the gorge was excised from the pastoral lease and gazetted as the "Trephina Gorge Scenic Reserve". This land was renamed in 1978 as the "Trephina Gorge Nature Park". On 17 September 2008, the title of this land was transferred to the Atnerrperrke Aboriginal Land Trust to be held on trust for its traditional owners. The land was subsequently leased to the Northern Territory government for 99 years to continue its use as the Trephina Gorge Nature Park.

Images showing from Trephina Gorge

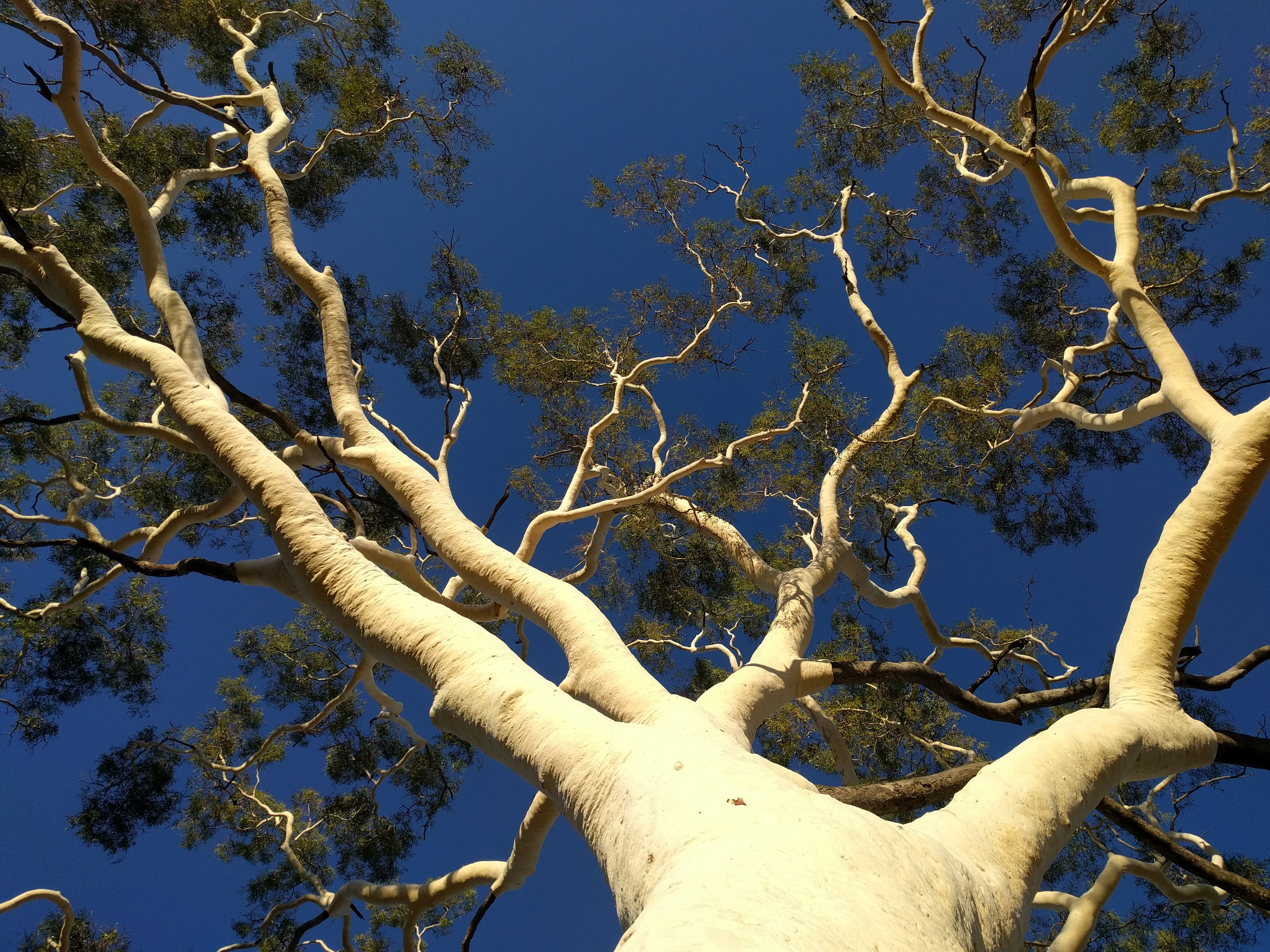
Ghost gum

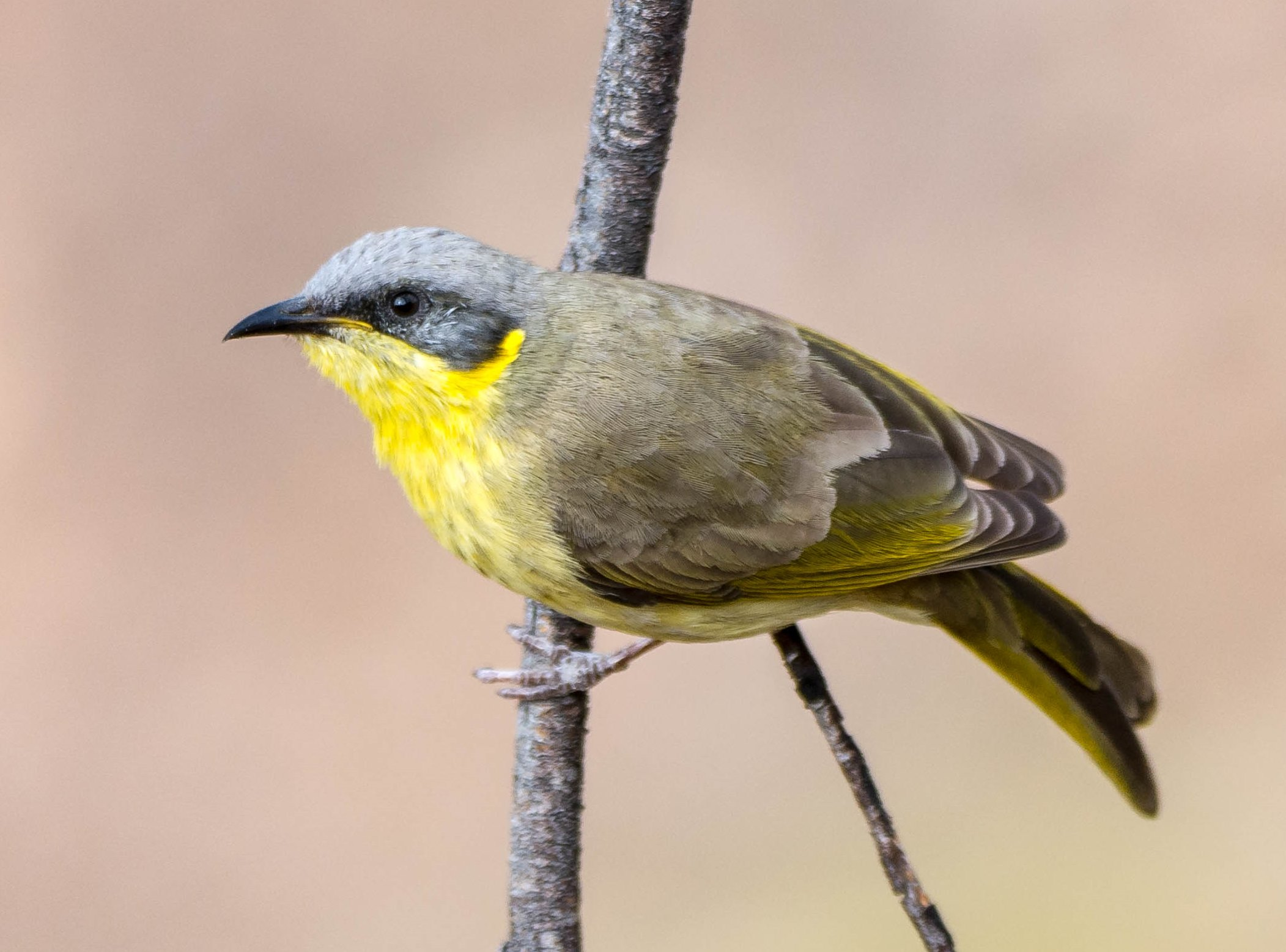
Grey-headed honeyeater at the gorge

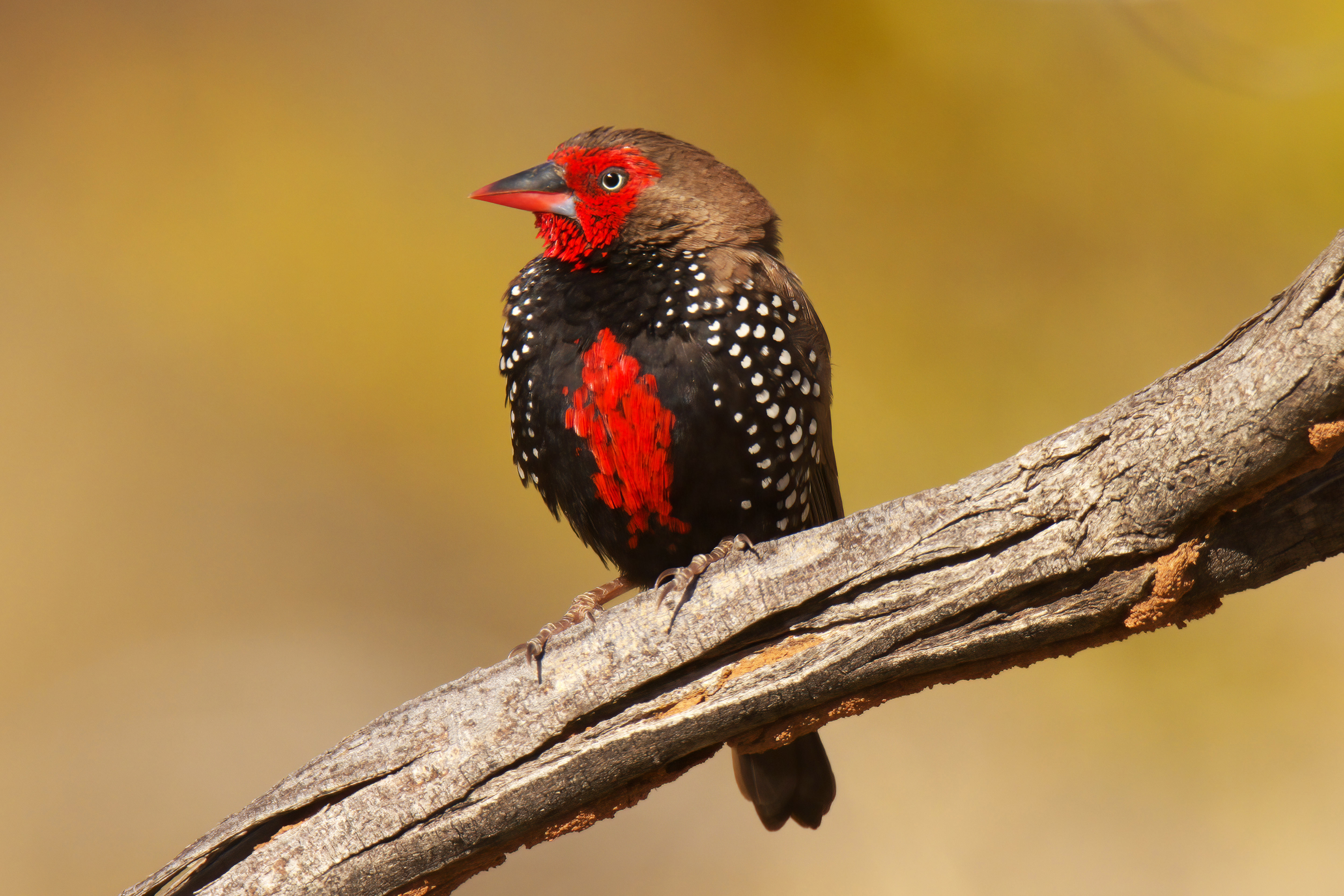
Painted finch at the gorge

== See also ==
- The Skinny Dip
