= Picnic Day (Australian holiday) =

Public holiday in the Northern Territory, first Monday of August

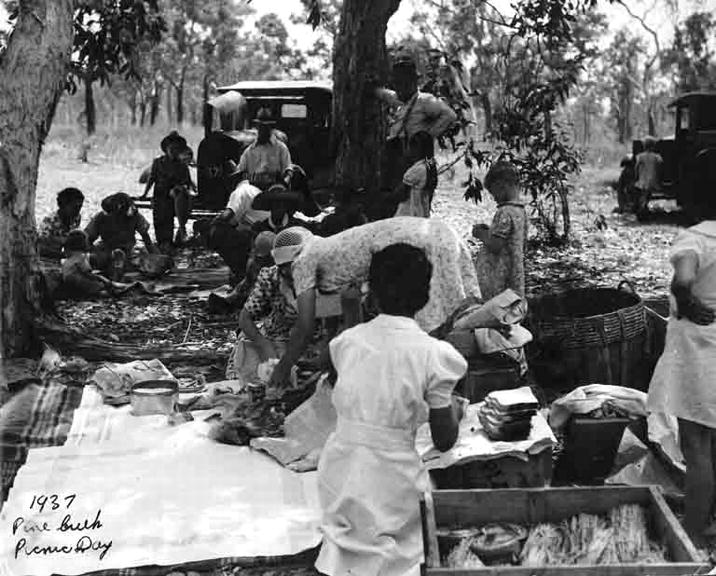
- Picnic Day in Pine Creek, 1937
- Observed by: Northern Territory, Australia
- Date: First Monday in August
- 2025 date: August 4
- 2026 date: August 3
- 2027 date: August 2
- 2028 date: August 7
- Frequency: annual

Picnic Day is a public holiday in the Northern Territory of Australia which takes place every year on the first Monday of August.

== History ==
Picnic Day events in the Northern Territory date back to the late 1800s. They were held in a variety of locations such as Adelaide River, Brunette Downs Station and Glencoe Paddock at differing times of year.

A regular annual Union Picnic Day or Trade Picnic Day was observed at Adelaide River by railway employees working on the North Australia Railway. The date of the first event is not known. The event included Public Works employees on some occasions. (Note: A popular but unsubstantiated belief is that Picnic Day commemorates the freeing of Chinese Coolie indentured labourers who built the North Australia Railway. According to the story, the Chinese workers were granted the right to stay in Australia and provided with sufficient money for a steamer fare to Hong Kong, but instead decided to go to Adelaide River for a picnic. No sources can be found to verify this story.) Between 1926 and 1935 a railway Picnic Day event was not held. An attempt was made to revive the holiday in 1933, but it was not officially observed again until three years later. On Monday 5 October 1936, a train transported people from Darwin to Adelaide River, leaving at 7 am and returning at 11 pm. The hotel at Adelaide River recorded record sales and the train was "forced to stop often as a number of male Darwin passengers fell off at various points along the line".

The Harts Range Races in Central Australia are held each Picnic Day long weekend. The races began in 1946, when three brothers Bennett, Qinton and Kil Webb from Mount Riddock Station raced stockman Jack Schaber and the regional policeman Senior Constable Bob Darken over a distance of about a mile to the Ulgarna Yards to determine who had the fastest horse. The event inspired the first formal racing meet at Harts Range in November 1947. It became an annual event. (Note: In Central Australia, a popular theory is that the Picnic Day holiday began with the first race meeting at Harts Range Races in 1947, but the Picnic Days observed elsewhere in the Northern Territory predate this.)

== See also ==
- Picnic horse racing
