= Plenty Highway =

Plenty Highway Northern Territory
- Map of central Australia with Plenty Highway highlighted in red

General information
- Type: Rural road
- Length: 498 km (309 mi)
- Route number(s): State Route 12

Major junctions
- West end: Stuart Highway (National Highway 87), 69 km (43 mi) north of Alice Springs
- Sandover Highway (State Route 14)
- East end: Donohue Highway, Tobermorey Homestead (NT/Queensland border)

Location(s)
- Major settlements: Atitjere, Huckitta, Jervois, Tarlton Downs

The Plenty Highway is a 498-kilometre (309 mi) outback mostly unsealed road in the Northern Territory of Australia between the Stuart Highway and north-western Queensland.

== Route description ==
The road begins at a turnoff from the Stuart Highway 68 kilometres (42 mi) north of Alice Springs, and finishes at Tobermorey Homestead on the Northern Territory/Queensland border. It then continues for another 249 kilometres (155 mi) to Boulia in Queensland, as the Donohue Highway.

The first 170 kilometres (110 mi) from the Stuart Highway is sealed. Of the next 108 kilometres (67 mi) to Jervois Homestead all bar 10 kilometres (6.2 mi) is unsealed as is the rest of the track to the Queensland Border. From the Queensland Border to Boulia the final 128 km (80 mi) is sealed with another 5 km (3.1 mi) east of the border. Information about its condition may be obtained from the Harts Range police station, 112 kilometres (70 mi) from the Stuart Highway.

East of Jervois Homestead, the road is formed earth, deteriorating to rocks and bulldust as it nears Tobermorey, 213 kilometres (132 mi) from Jervois Homestead. The road north to Urandangi and thence to Mount Isa bears left just before Tobermorey.

== Road condition ==
The worst sections of the road are in the Northern Territory, with deep potholes and bulldust. On the Queensland side of the border the road has had significant upgrades and is of a hard pack gravel surface. It is 249 kilometres (155 mi) from Tobermorey to Boulia and good camping may be found at the Georgina River, at about the 125 kilometres (78 mi) mark.

Fuel and food may be obtained at Gemtree, Atitjere community, Jervois Homestead and Boulia. As of June 2018, fuel and camping is available at Tobermorey. Road trains up to 53 metres (174 ft) in length use both highways.

== Upgrades ==
The Northern Australia Roads Program announced in 2016 included the following project for the Plenty Highway.

=== Progressive sealing and flood immunity ===
The project to progressively seal and provide flood immunity improvements was expected to be complete in late 2021 at a total cost of $25 million. As of August 2025 this has not been done.

== Junctions and localities ==
Location	km	mi	Destinations	Notes
Burt Plain			Stuart Highway (National route 87) – Alice Springs Darwin	68 kilometres (42 mi) north of Alice Springs
Anmatjere	27	17	Sandover Highway (state route 14) – Camooweal	
Gemtree	70	43		Caravan park, fuel available
Harts Range, Atitjere	147	91		Fuel available
Huckitta Station	200	120		
Jervois Station	277	172		Fuel available
Tarlton Downs Station	347	216		
Tobermorey	492	306	Urandangi Road – Urandangi, Mount Isa	
Tobermorey Homestead	496	308	Continues into Queensland as Donohue Highway – Boulia	
1.000 mi = 1.609 km; 1.000 km = 0.621 mi

== See also ==
- Highways in Australia
- List of highways in the Northern Territory
