= Canberra Day =

Public holiday in the Australian Capital Territory

- Observed by: Australian Capital Territory; Jervis Bay Territory
- Type: Public
- Date: Second Monday in March
- 2025 date: March 10
- 2026 date: March 9
- 2027 date: March 8
- 2028 date: March 13
- Frequency: Annual

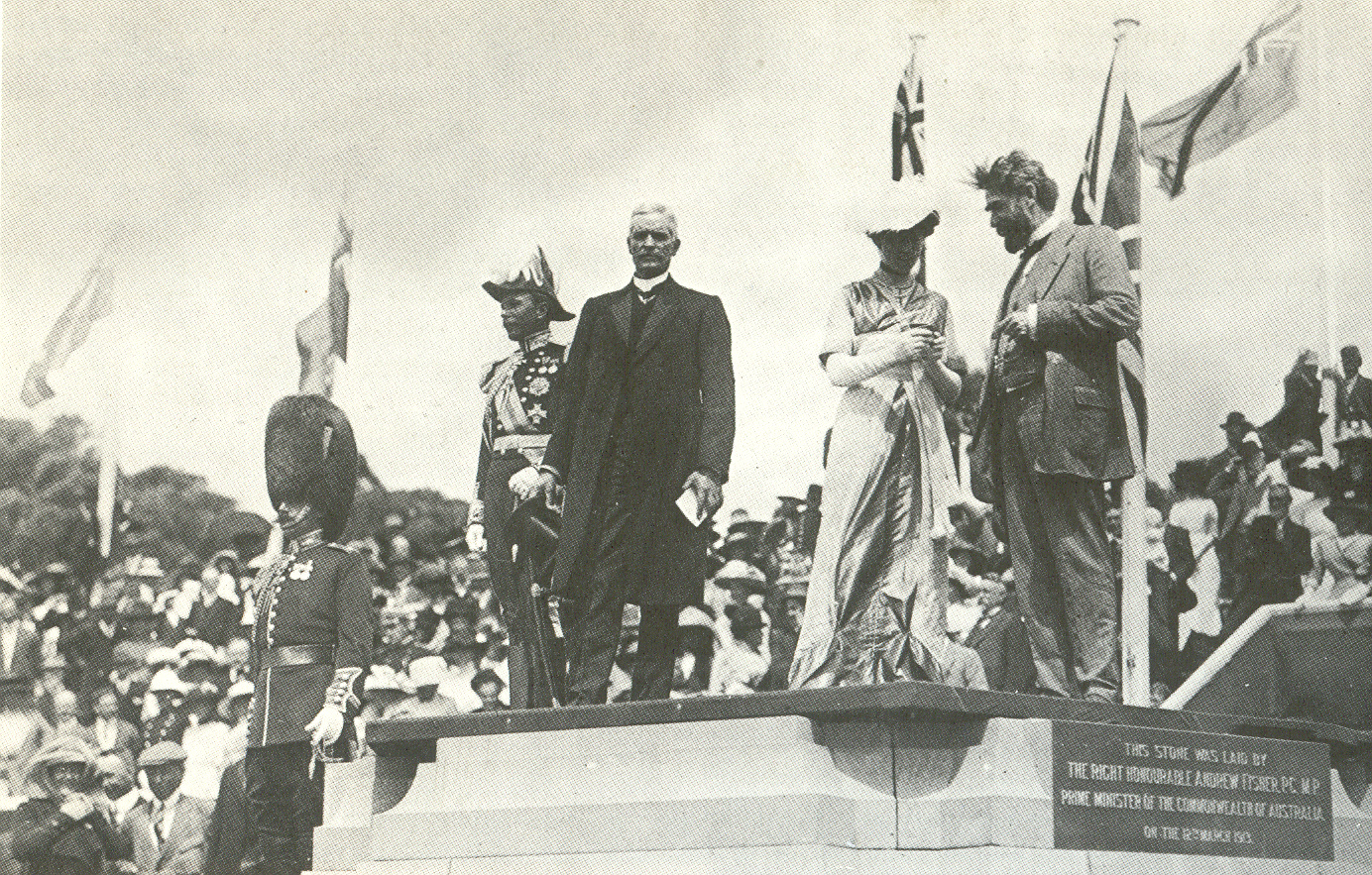
The ceremony for the naming of Canberra in 1913

Canberra Day is a public holiday in Australia held annually on the second Monday in March in the Australian Capital Territory (ACT) and the Jervis Bay Territory (JBT) to celebrate the official naming of Canberra. Canberra was named at a ceremony on 12 March 1913 by Lady Denman, the wife of the then Governor-General Lord Denman.

On 3 March 2007, the ACT Minister Andrew Barr (now Chief Minister of the Australian Capital Territory) introduced a bill to change the day of Canberra Day to the second Monday in March so it falls closer more often to the actual birthday of Canberra. Previously it had been held on the third Monday in March. In 2012 Canberra Day fell on 12 March. In 2013 it fell on 11 March, for the Centenary of Canberra.

Annual events associated with Canberra Day include the Hands Up for Canberra Giving Day (a community fundraising event held on 11 March in 2020), the Canberra Festival, which runs from 11 to 20 March 2011, the Chief Minister's Canberra Day Awards Ceremony, and the Canberra Festival Balloon Spectacular.

== See also ==
- History of Canberra
- Public holidays in Australia
