= Atitjere, Northern Territory =

Atitjere
- Suburb
- Coordinates: 22°58′56″S 134°55′58″E
- Country: Australia
- State: Northern Territory
- LGA: Central Desert Region
- Location: 1,247 km (775 mi) S of Darwin

Government
  - Territory electorate: Namatjira
  - Federal division: Lingiari

Area
  - Total: 7 km^{2} (2.7 sq mi)
- Elevation (weather station): 661 m (2,169 ft)

Population
  - Total: 204 (2021)
  - Density: 29.1/km^{2} (75/sq mi)
- Time zone: UTC+9:30 (ACST)
- Postcode: 0872
- Mean max temp: 28.8 °C (83.8 °F)
- Mean min temp: 13.2 °C (55.8 °F)
- Annual rainfall: 297.3 mm (11.70 in)
Suburbs around Atitjere
Hart	Hart	Hart
Hart	Atitjere	Hart
Hart	Hart	Hart

Atitjere is a community in Akityarre Ward of the Central Desert Region in the Northern Territory of Australia.

The 2021 Australian census which was conducted in August 2021 reports that Atitjere had a population of 204 of which 157 (77.0%) identified as “Aboriginal and/or Torres Strait Islander people.”

Hart is located within the federal division of Lingiari, the territory electoral division of Namatjira and the local government area of the Central Desert Region.
