= List of automotive museums =

An automotive museum is a museum that explores the history of automotive-related transportation.

- **Bold** – museums owned by automotive manufacturers
- Italics – no longer open to public access, excluding private or invitation-only collections that were never intended for public access

== Africa ==
=== Ghana ===
- Despite Automobile Museum, Accra.

=== South Africa ===
==== Cape Town and surrounds ====
- Franschhoek Motor Museum, Franschhoek
- Wijnland Auto Museum, Kraaifontein, Cape Town
- Tannery Cars, Wellington

== Asia ==
=== Eastern Asia ===
==== China ====
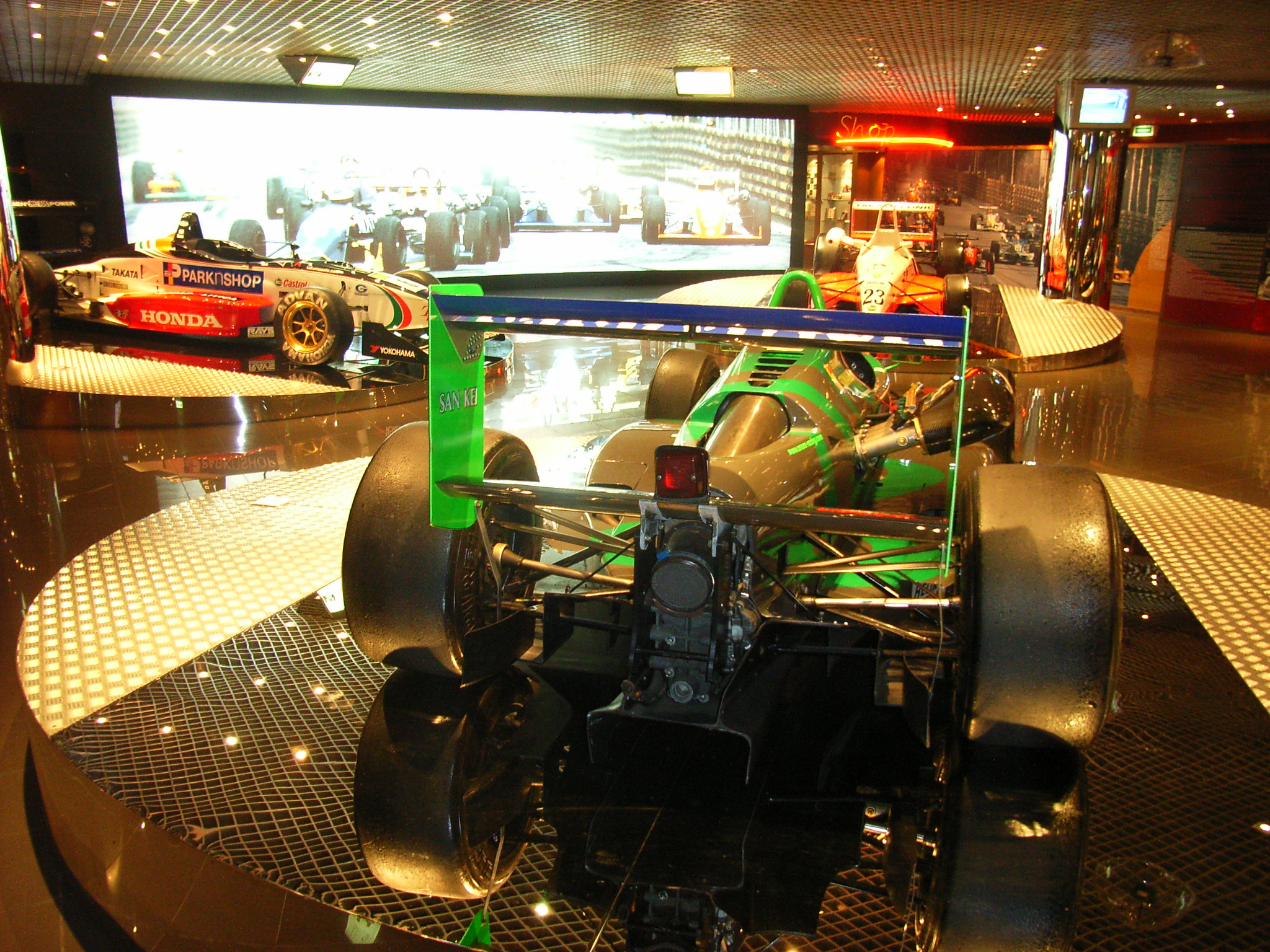
Grand Prix Museum, Macau, China

- Beijing Classic Car Museum, Beijing
- Beijing Auto Museum, Beijing
- Grand Prix Museum, Macau
- Shanghai Auto Museum, Shanghai

==== Japan ====
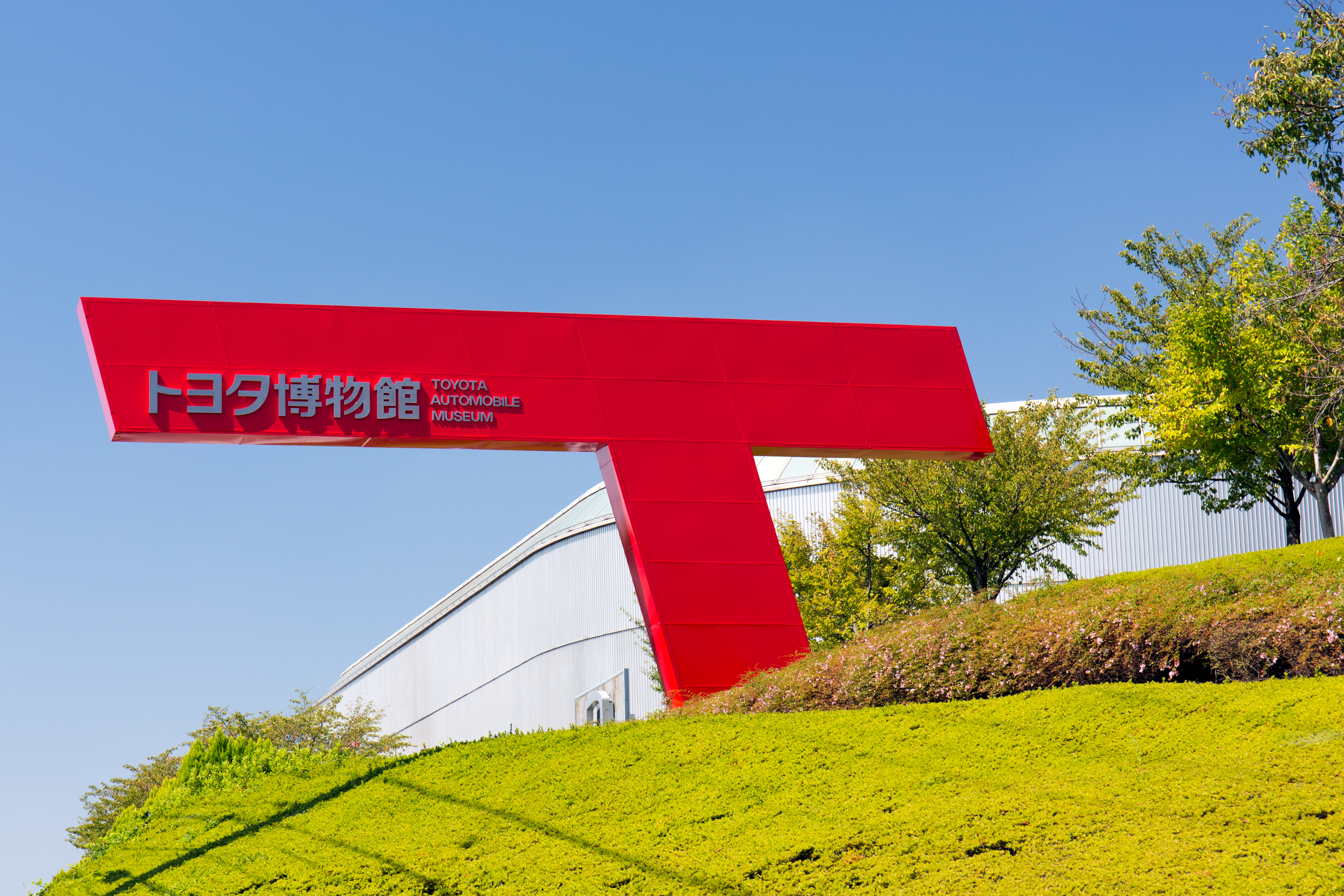
Toyota Automobile Museum, Nagakute, Japan

- **Hino Auto Plaza** (Hino Motors), Hachiōji, Tokyo
- Historic Car Gallery, Dachi, Toki, Gifu
- **Honda Collection Hall** (Honda), Motegi, Tochigi
- **Humobility World** (Daihatsu), Ikeda, Osaka
- Maehara 20th, Kiryū, Gunma
- Matsuda Collection
- **Mazda Museum** (Mazda), Hiroshima, Hiroshima
- **Mitsubishi Auto Gallery** (Mitsubishi Motors), Okazaki, Aichi
- Motorcar Museum of Japan, Komatsu, Ishikawa
- Il Museo della Cinquecento, Tsuruoka, Yamagata
- **Nissan Engine Museum** (Nissan), Yokohama, Kanagawa
- **Nissan Heritage Collection** (Nissan), Zama, Kanagawa
- Prince & Skyline Museum, Okaya, Nagano
- Shikoku Motor Car Museum, Kōnan, Kōchi
- **Suzuki Plaza** (Suzuki), Hamamatsu, Shizuoka
- **Toyota Automobile Museum** (Toyota), Nagakute, Aichi
- **Toyota Commemorative Museum of Industry and Technology** (Toyota), Nagoya, Aichi
- **Toyota Kuragaike Commemorative Hall** (Toyota), Toyota, Aichi
- **Yamaha Communication Plaza** (Yamaha Motor Company), Iwata, Shizuoka
- Wakui Museum, Kazo, Saitama

==== South Korea ====
- **Renault Korea Gallery** (Renault Korea)
- **Hyundai Kia R&D Museum** (Hyundai Motor Group)
- Samsung Fire & Marine Insurance Mobility Museum (Samsung Fire & Marine Insurance)
- Hyundai Motorstudio Seoul (Hyundai Motor Group)
- World Automobile & Piano Museum, Jeju Province

==== Taiwan ====
- Taxi Museum, Su'ao, Yilan County

=== Southeastern Asia ===
==== Indonesia ====
- Museum Angkut, Batu, East Java
- Kebon Vintage Cars Museum, Denpasar, Bali, Indonesia

=== Southern Asia ===
==== India ====
- Sudha Cars Museum, Hyderabad
- Payana Museum
- Dastan Auto World Vintage Car Museum, Ahmedabad, India
- Vintage and Classic Car Museum
- Titus Museum
- Heritage Transport Museum, Gurgaon
- Gedee Car Museum

=== Western Asia ===
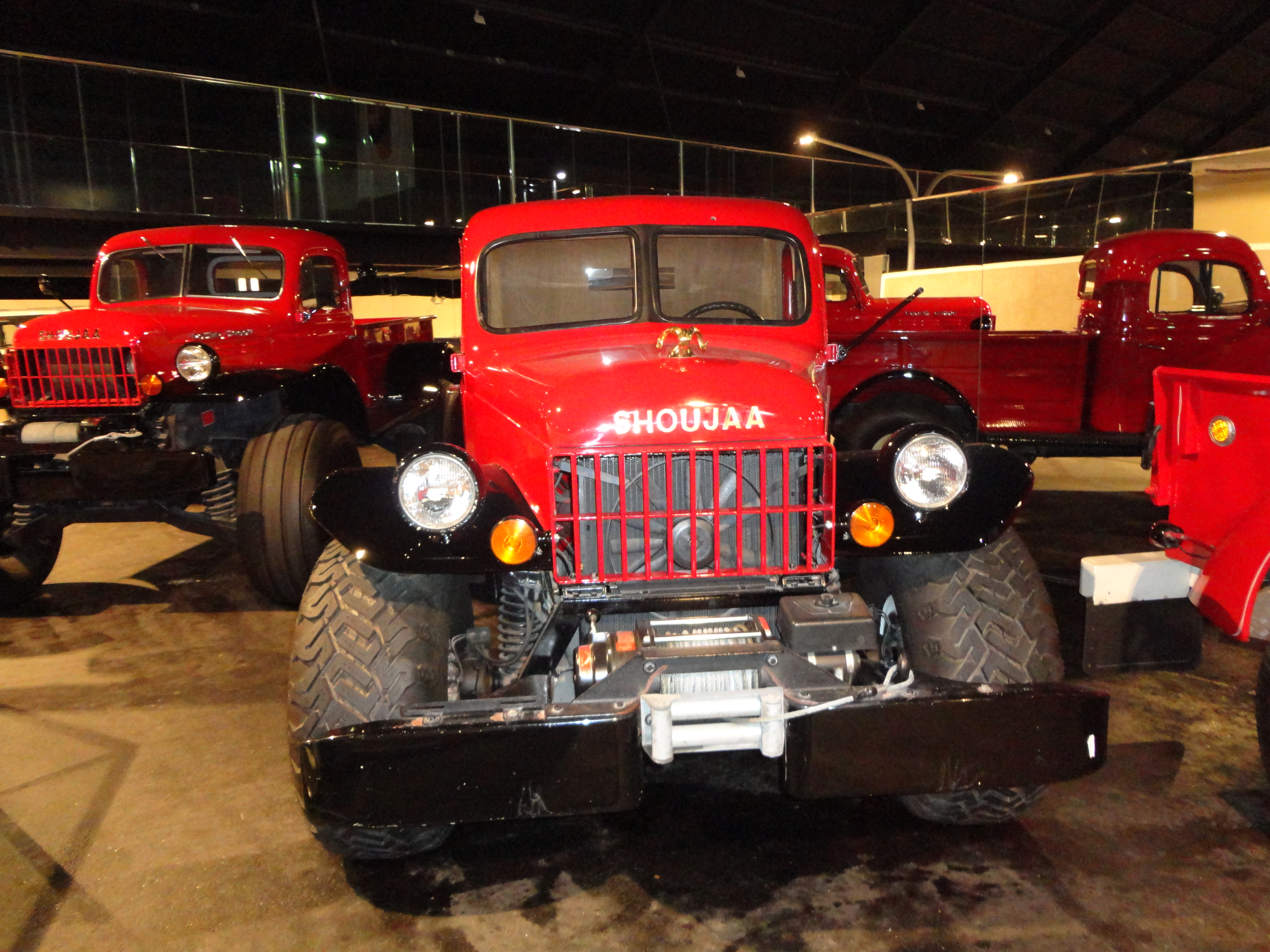
Emirates National Auto Museum, Abu Dhabi, United Arab Emirates

==== Cyprus ====
- Cyprus Historic and Classic Motor Museum

==== Georgia ====
- Tbilisi Auto Museum

==== Iran ====
- National Car Museum of Iran

==== Israel ====
- Tefen Car Collection, Tefen
- Ralex Automobile museum, Ashdod

==== Jordan ====
- Royal Automobile Museum, Amman

==== Kuwait ====
- Historical, Vintage, and Classical Cars Museum

==== Turkey ====
- Key Classic Car Museum, Torbalı, Izmir,
- Rahmi M. Koç Museum, Hasköy, Istanbul,
- Sabri Artam Classic Car Museum, Çengelköy, Istanbul,
- Tofaş Museum of Cars and Anatolian Carriages, Bursa,
- Ural Ataman Classic Car Museum, Tarabya, Istanbul,

==== United Arab Emirates ====
- Al Ain Classic Car Museum
- Emirates National Auto Museum

== Europe ==
=== Eastern Europe ===
==== Czech Republic ====
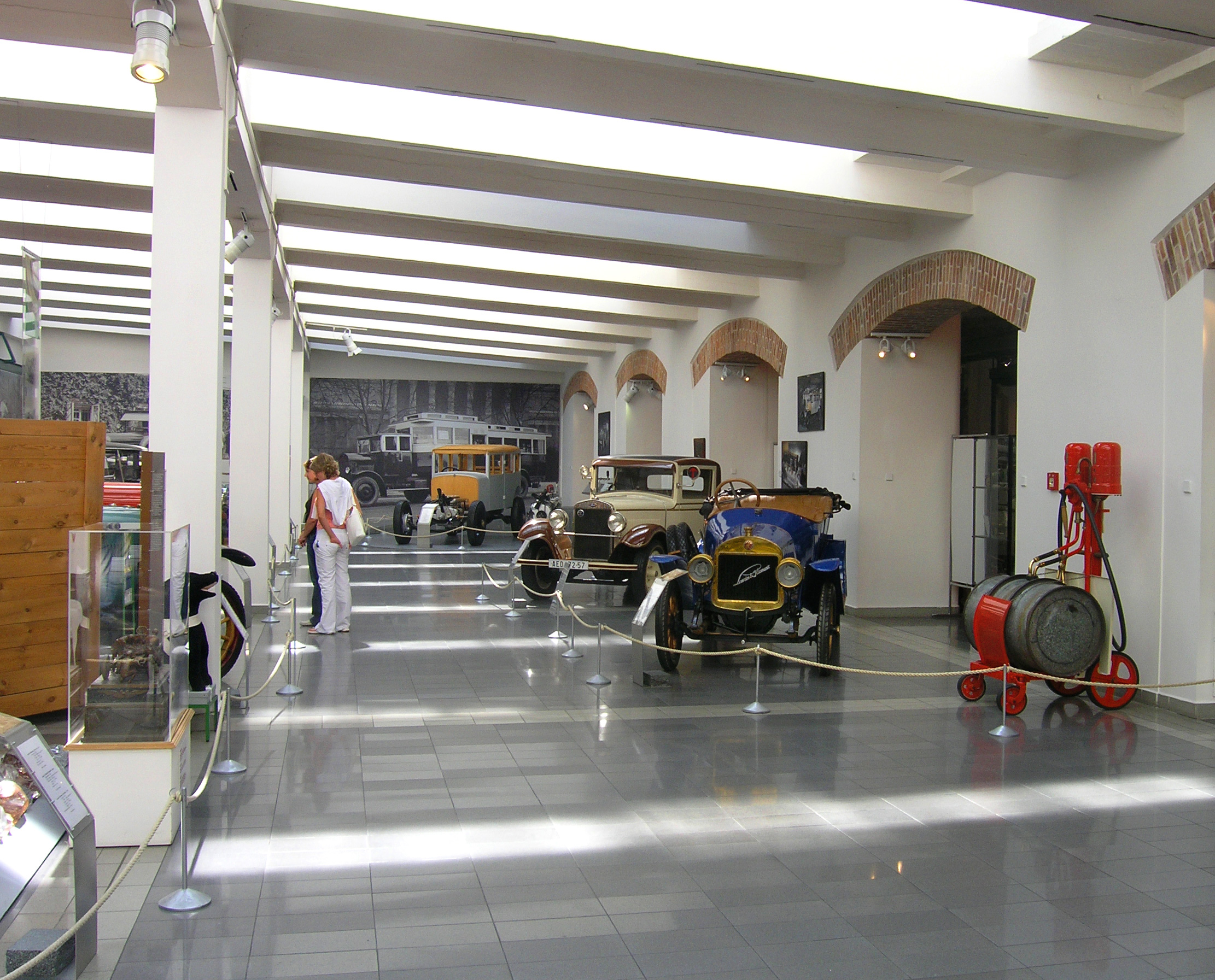
Škoda Auto Museum, Mladá Boleslav, Czech Republic

- Automuzeum Pelechov.
- **Škoda Auto Museum** (Škoda Auto)
- Sports car museum, Lany.
- Tatra Technical Museum, Kopřivnice
- Veteran arena, Olomouc.

==== Poland ====
- Muzeum Inżynierii Miejskiej w Krakowie

==== Russia ====
- Autoville, Moscow
- **AvtoVAZ Museum**, (Lada), Tolyatti
- First Private Museum of Retro and Military Vehicles, Moscow
- Lomakovsky Museum of Vintage Cars and Motorcycles, Moscow
- Museum of the history of OJSC GAZ
- Retro auto museum, Moscow
- Retro cars museum, Vyborg
- Retro cars museum, Zelenogorsk
- Retro cars museum, Yekaterinburg
- UMMC Museum of Military and Automotive Equipment, Verkhnyaya Pyshma
- Vadim Zadorozhny Museum of Technology, Arkhangelskoye
- Vintage cars museum, Saint Petersburg

==== Ukraine ====
- **AvtoZAZ Museum** (ZAZ), Zaporizhzhia
- Phaeton (museum), Zaporizhzhia
- Portal, Zaporizhzhia

=== Northern Europe ===
==== Denmark ====
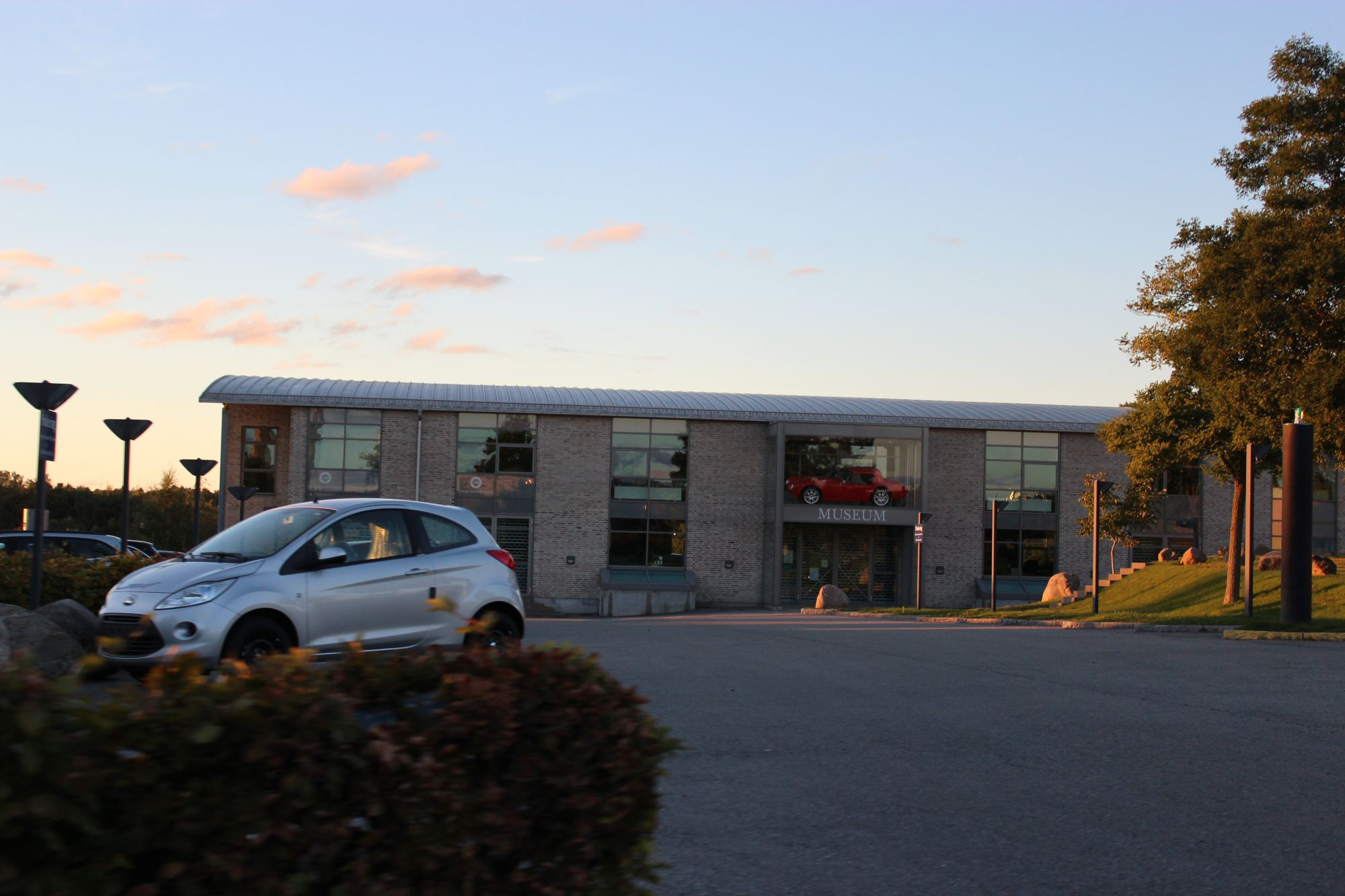
Sommer's Automobile Museum, Nærum, Denmark

- Bornholms Automobilmuseum, Aakirkeby
- Europæisk Automobilmuseum, Odense
- Bornholms Automobilmuseum, Gjern
- Næstved Automobilmuseum, Næstved
- Samsø Austin Museum, Torup
- Skoda Museum Danmark, Glamsbjerg
- Sommer's Automobile Museum, Nærum
- Veteranmuseet at Egeskov Castle
- Veteranmuseet at Aalholm

==== Estonia ====
- Car Museum, Halinga

==== Finland ====
- Espoon Automuseo
- Etelä-Karjalan Automuseo
- Mobilia, Kangasala
- Oulun Automuseo
- Uusikaupunki Automobile Museum, Uusikaupunki
- Vehoniemen automuseo

==== Latvia ====
- Riga Motor Museum

==== Lithuania ====
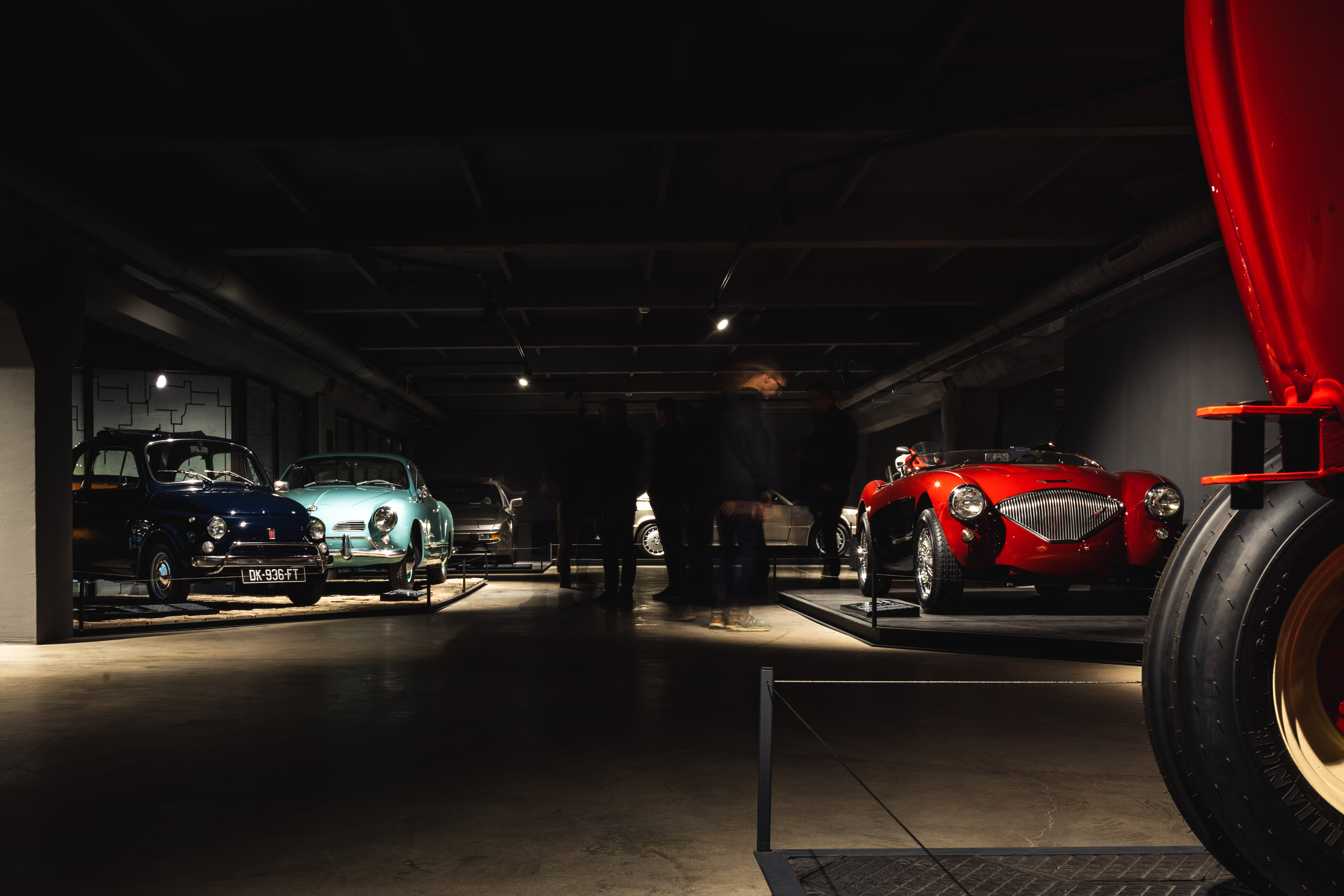
Automuseum Vilnius exhibition, Vilnius, Lithuania

- Automuseum Vilnius, Vilnius

==== Sweden ====
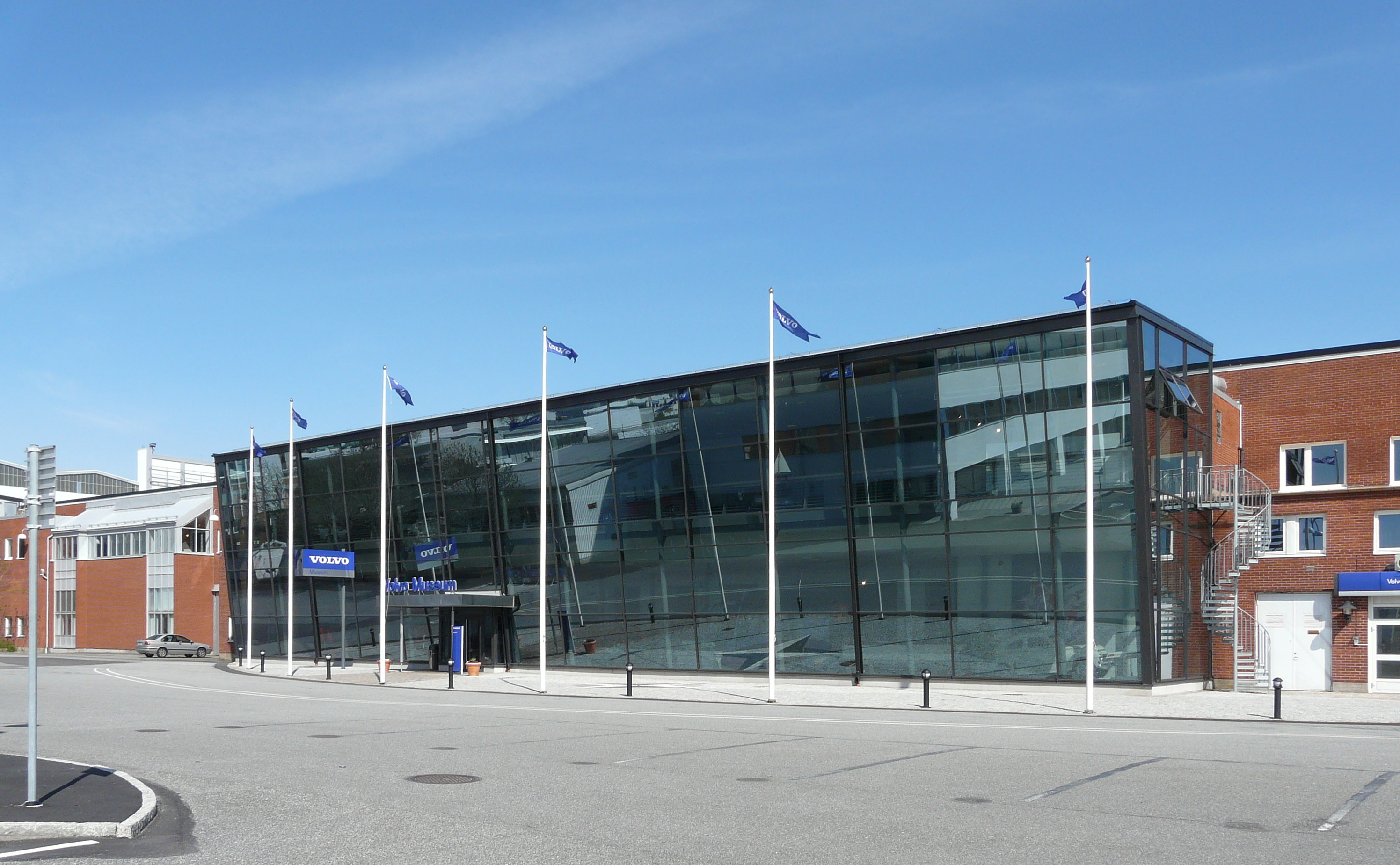
Volvo Museum, Gothenburg, Sweden

- Autoseum
- Bil- och Teknikhistoriska Samlingarna
- Car Museum - Albinsson & Sjöberg, Karlskrona
- Göran Karlsson's Motor Museum
- Härnösands bilmuseum
- Ivars bilmuseum
- **Marcus Wallenberg-hallen** (Scania)
- Motala Motor Museum
- Motor & nostalgimuseet
- **Saab Car Museum** (Saab)
- Vännäs motormuseum
- **Volvo Museum** (Volvo)
- World of Classics

=== Southern Europe ===
==== Bulgaria ====
- Retro-Museum, Varna shopping centre

==== Croatia ====
- Ferdinand Budicki Automobile Museum

==== Greece ====
- Hellenic Motor Museum, Athens, Attica

==== Italy ====
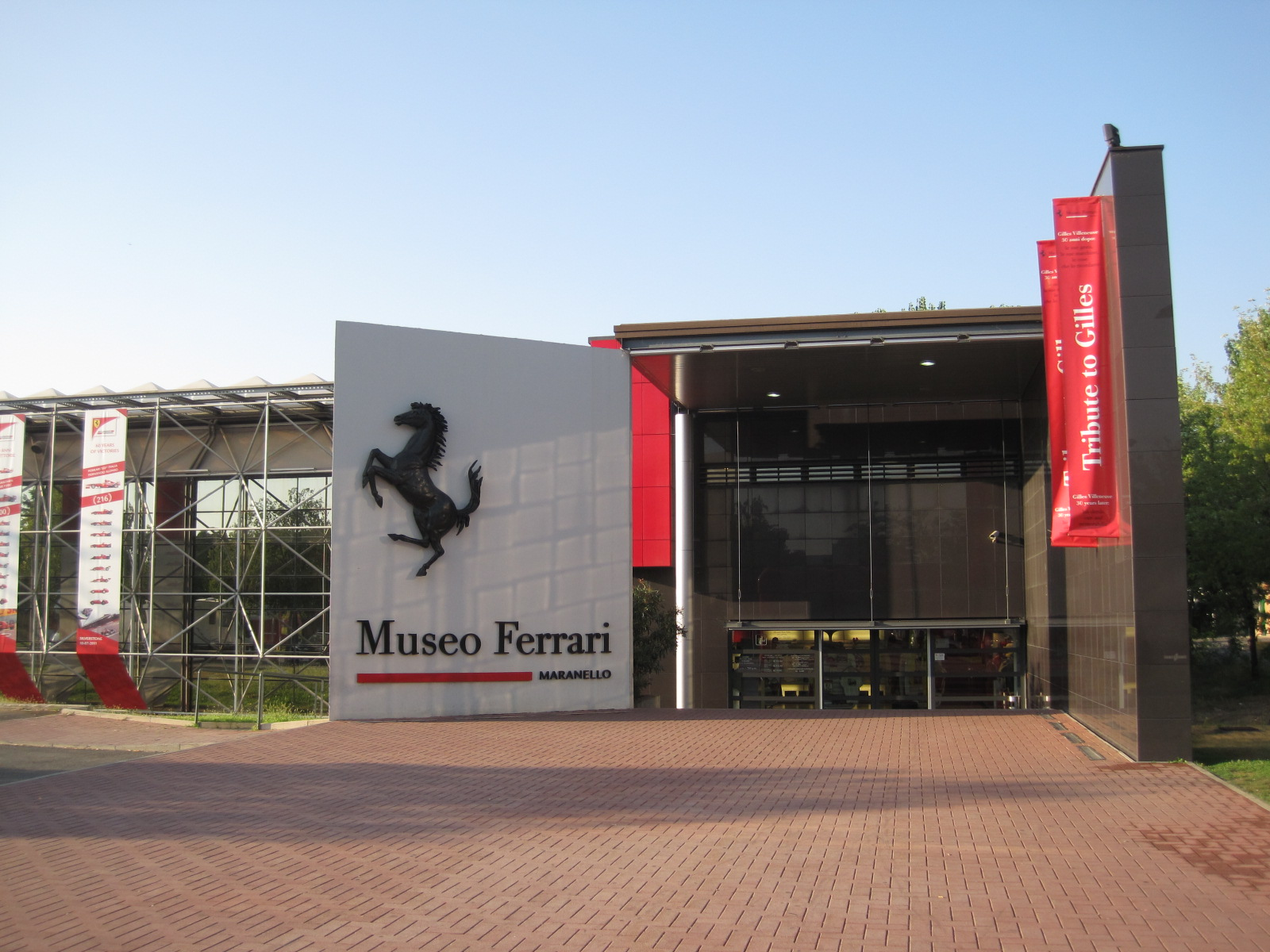
Museo Ferrari, Maranello, Italy

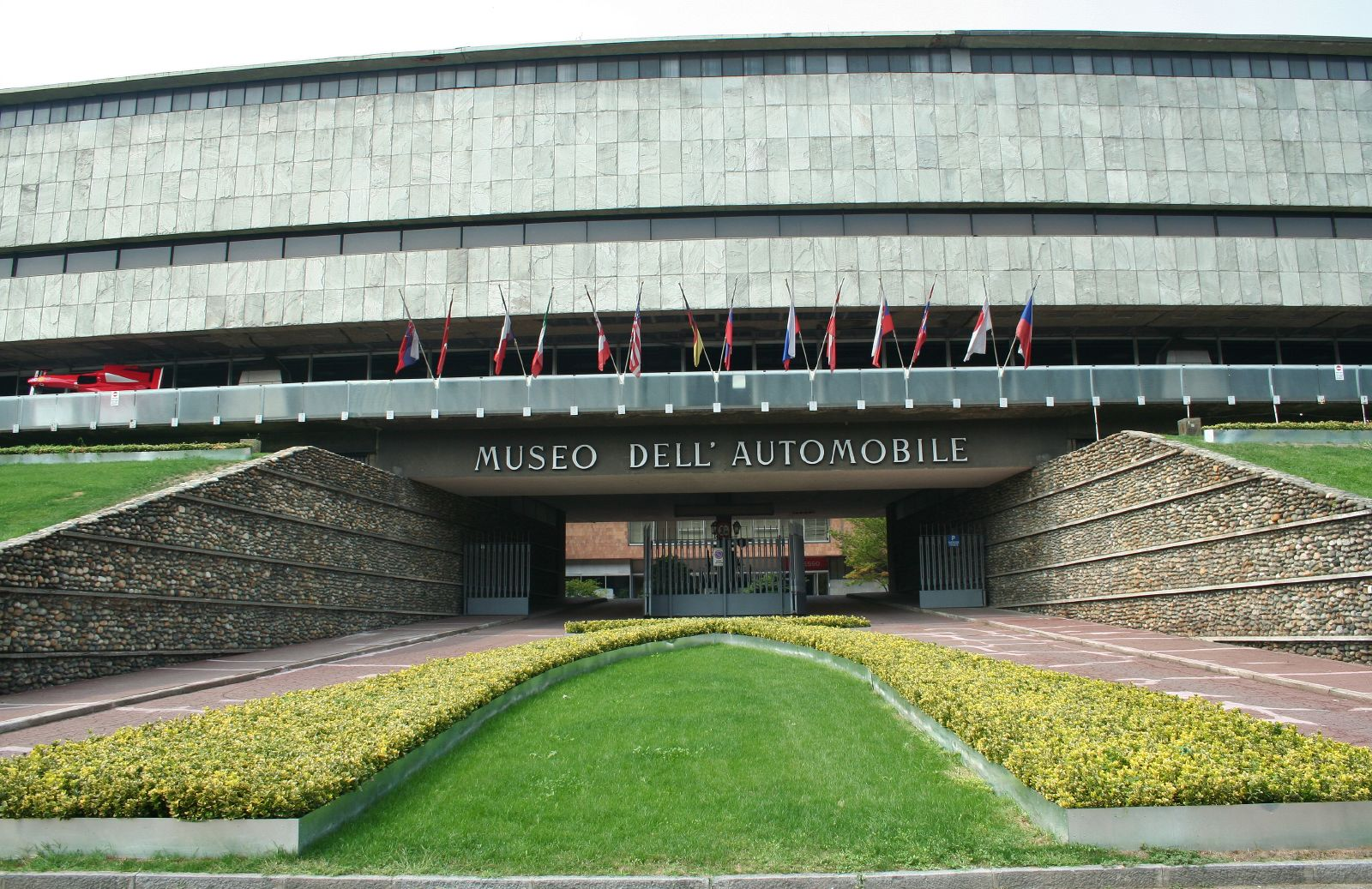
Museo Nazionale dell'Automobile, Turin, Italy

- **Museo Casa Enzo Ferrari** (Ferrari)
- Centro storico Fiat (Fiat)
- **Museo Ferrari** (Ferrari)
- **Museo Ferruccio Lamborghini** (Lamborghini)
- **Museo Lamborghini** (Lamborghini)
- Museo Lancia (Lancia)
- **Museo Nazionale dell'Automobile**
- Museo Nicolis
- **Museo Mille Miglia**
- **Museo Storico Alfa Romeo** (Alfa Romeo)
- Museo Targa Florio
- Lancia Museum

==== Romania ====
- Țiriac Collection, Otopeni

==== Serbia ====
- Muzej automobila, Belgrade

=== Western Europe ===
==== Andorra ====
- National Automobile Museum

==== Austria ====
- Rolls-Royce Museum
- Automobilmuseum Aspang

==== Belgium ====
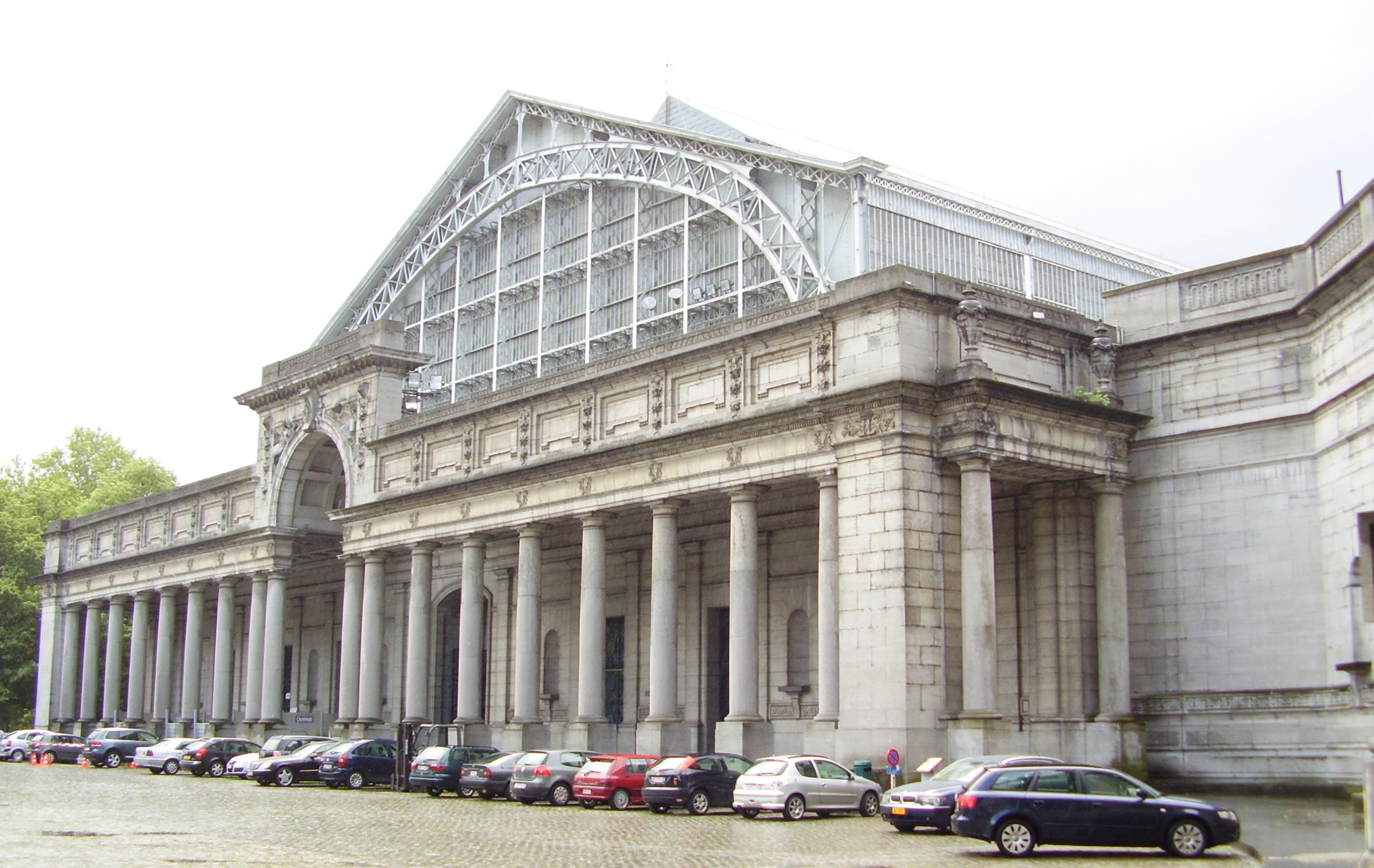
AutoWorld, Brussels, Belgium

- AutoWorld
- Mahymobiles

==== France ====
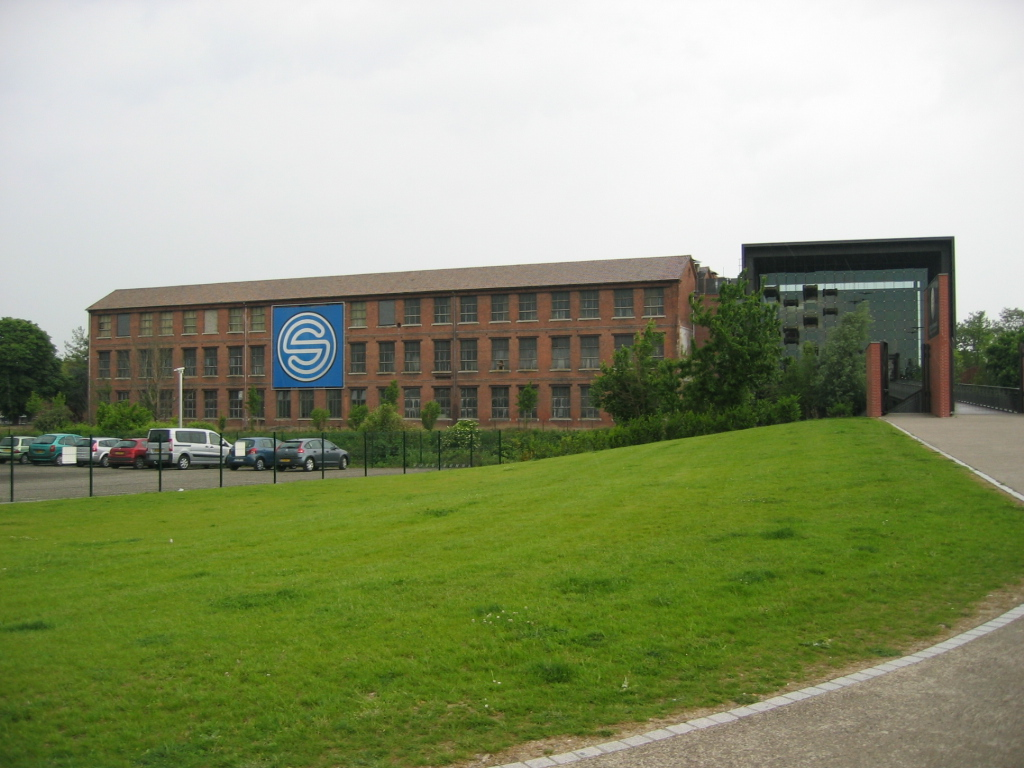
Musée national de l’automobile (Cité de l'Automobile), Mulhouse, France

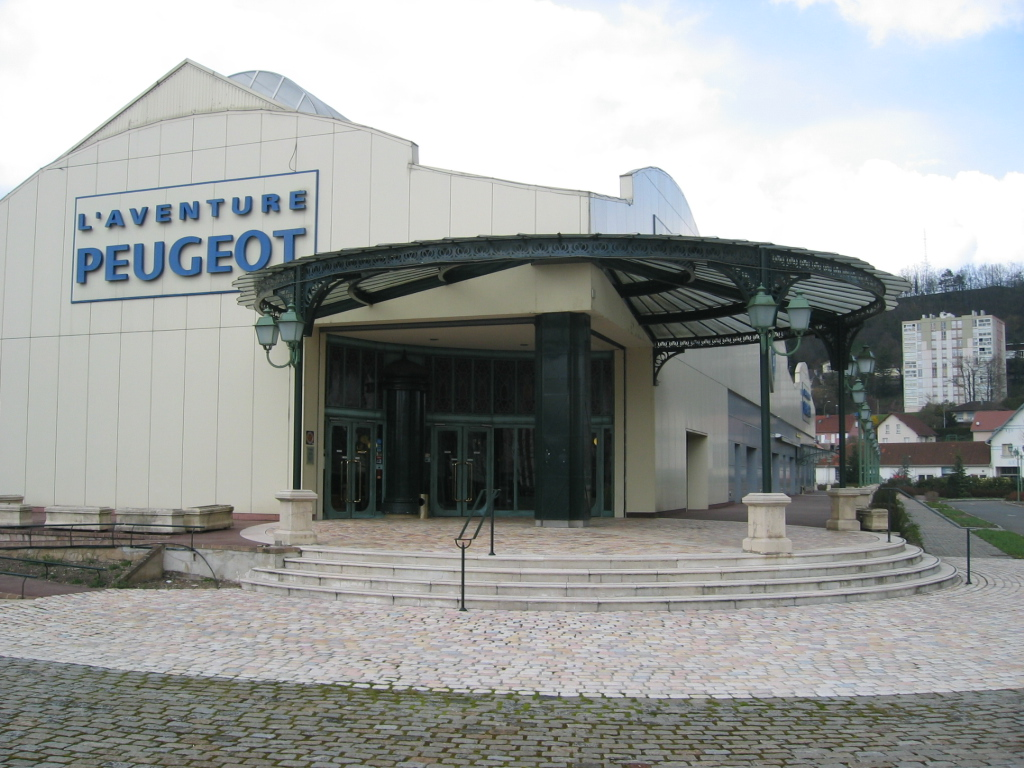
Musée de l'Aventure Peugeot, Sochaux, France

- Cité de l'automobile - Musée national - Collection Schlumpf
- Manoir de l'Automobile (Lohéac)
- **Renault Classic** (Renault)
- **Musée de l'Aventure Peugeot** (Peugeot)
- **Conservatoire Citroën** (Citroën)
- Musée des 24 Heures du Mans
- Musée automobile Reims Champagne
- Musée de la Chartreuse, Molsheim
- National Car and Tourism Museum at Château de Compiègne

==== Germany ====
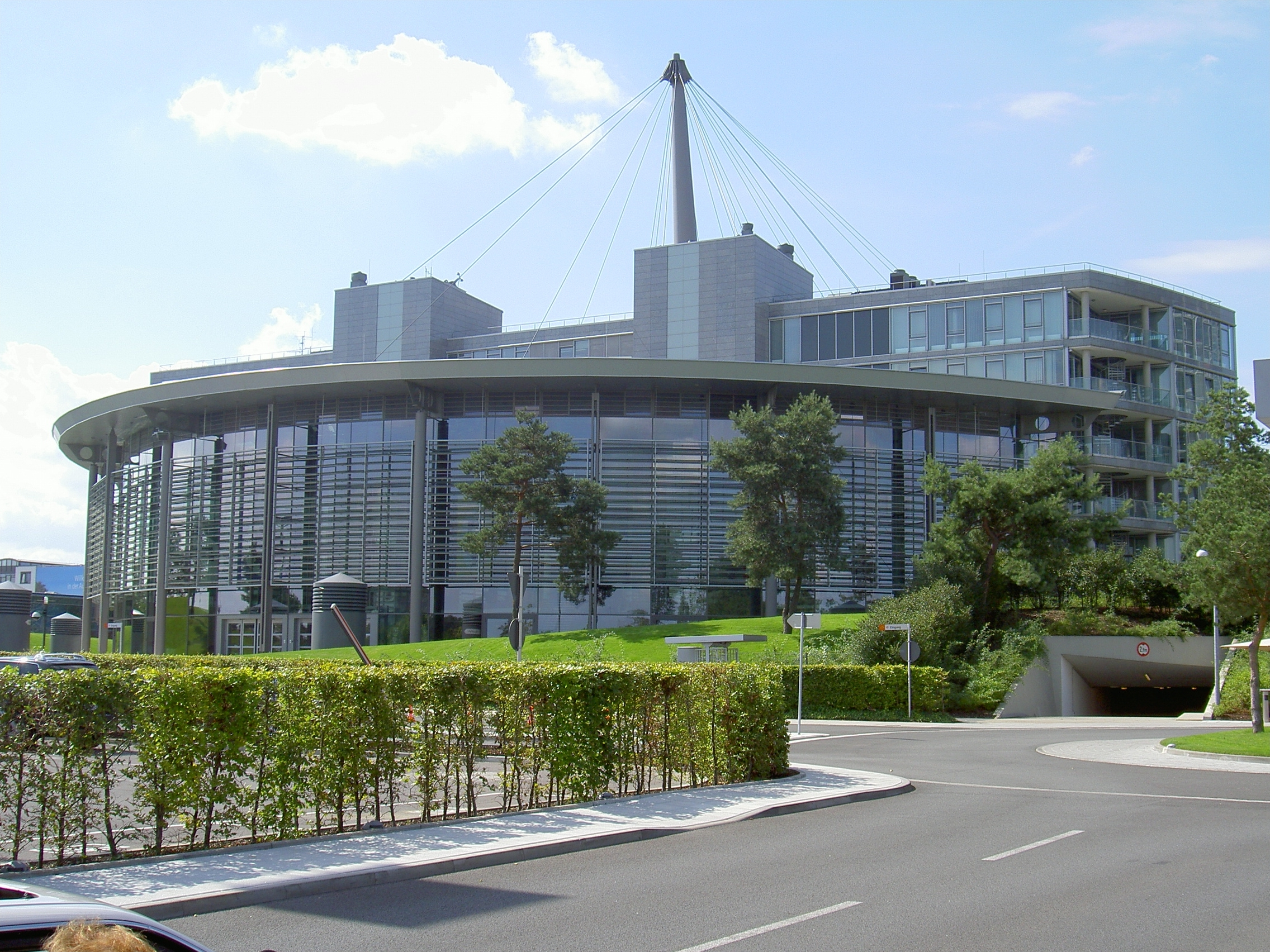
Autostadt, Wolfsburg, Germany

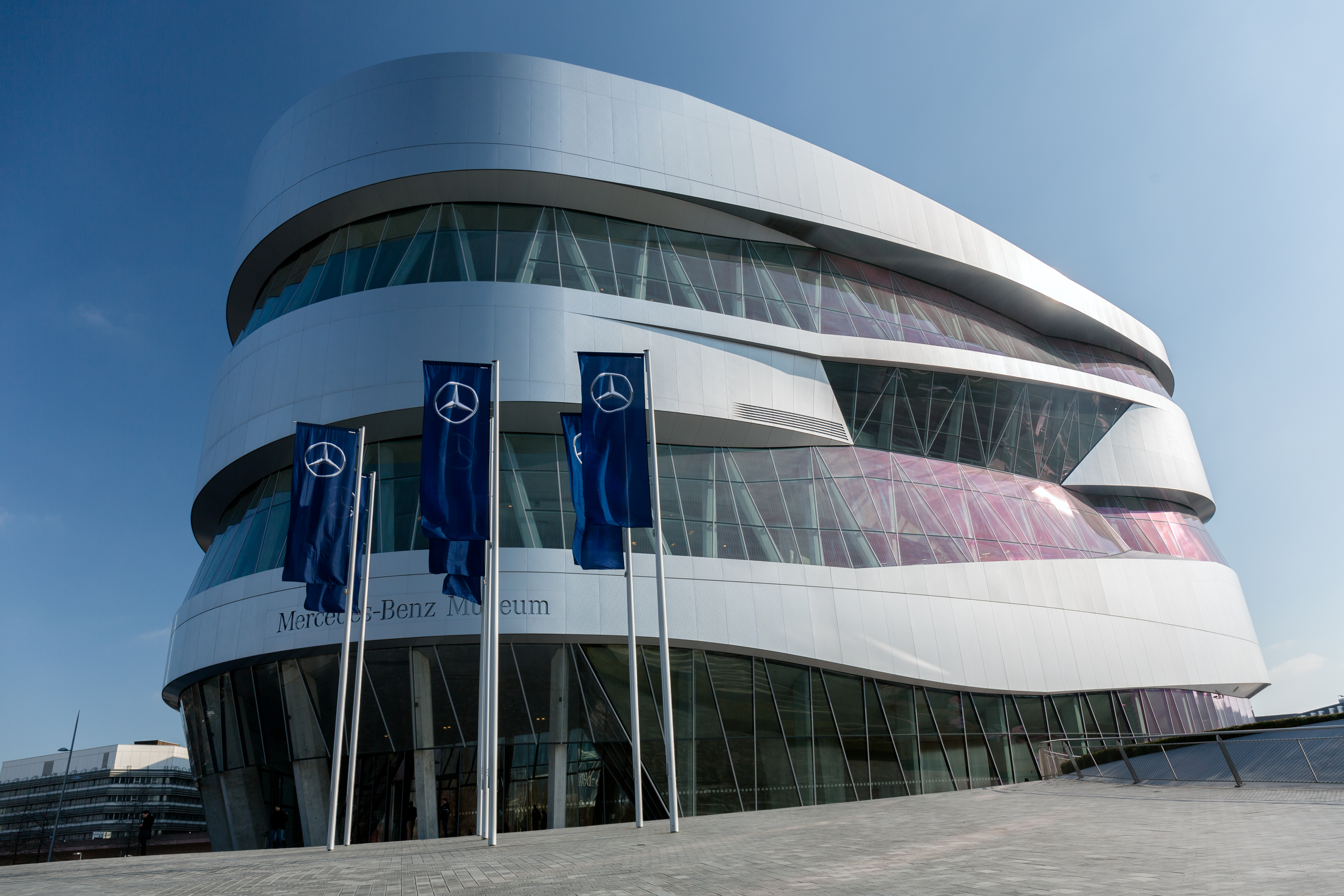
Mercedes-Benz Museum, Stuttgart, Germany

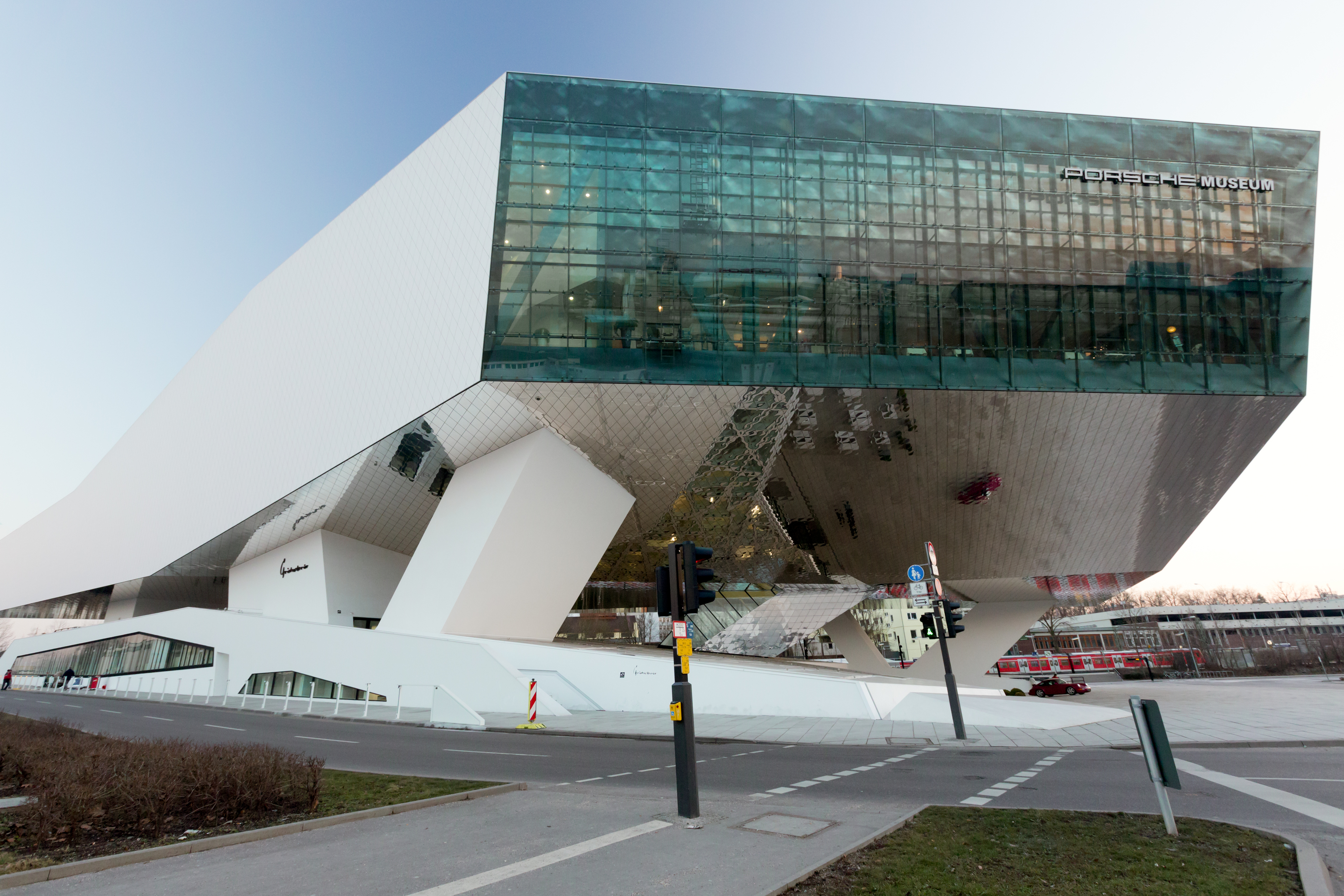
Porsche Museum, Stuttgart, Germany

- 1st German Toyota Museum
- **August Horch Museum Zwickau** (Audi)
- Automobile Welt Eisenach
- Automuseum Dr. Carl Benz
- Automuseum Prototyp
- Autosammlung Steim
- **Autostadt** (Volkswagen Group)
- **BMW Museum** (BMW)
- **Mercedes-Benz Museum** (Daimler AG)
- EFA-Museum für Deutsche Automobilgeschichte
- Museum Autovision
- Mazda Museum Augsburg
- Museum for Historical Maybach Vehicles
- **museum mobile** (Audi)
- **Porsche Museum** (Porsche)
- Sinsheim Auto & Technik Museum
- Technikmuseum Speyer
- Prototyp - Personen.Kraft.Wagen in Hamburg
- PS Speicher
- Rosso Bianco Collection

==== Malta ====
- Malta Classic Car Museum

==== Monaco ====
- Monaco Top Cars Collection, Fontvieille, Monaco

==== Netherlands ====
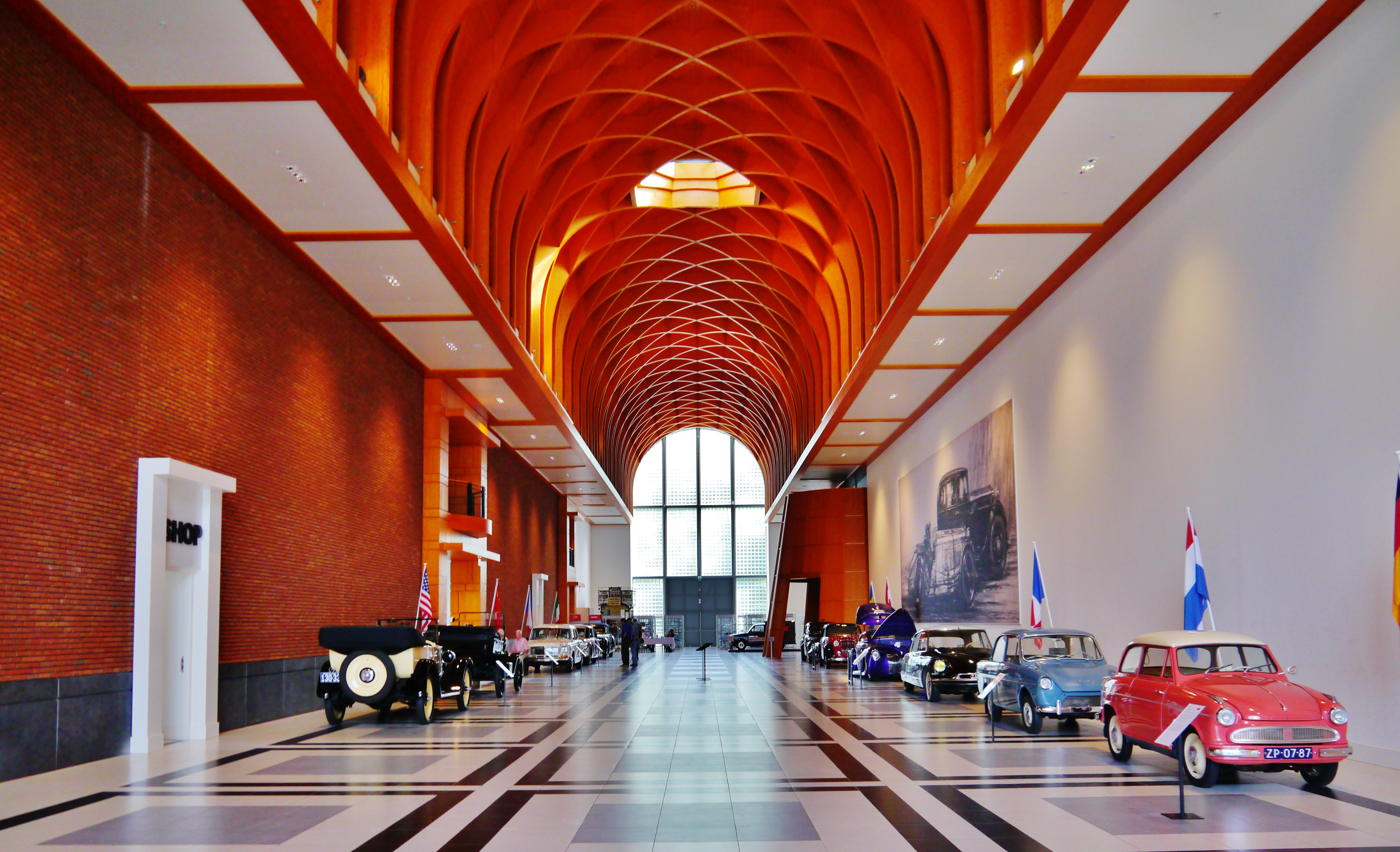
Louwman Museum, The Hague, Netherlands

- Louwman Museum

==== Portugal ====
- Museu do Caramulo, Caramulo

==== San Marino ====
- Maranello Rosso (Ferrari and Abarth)

==== Spain ====
- Museo Automovilístico de Málaga
- Museo de Historia de la Automoción de Salamanca
- Museo de Coches Clásicos y Antiguos Torre Loizaga (Galdames)
- Museo del Motor de Finestrat

==== Switzerland ====
- Autobau Erlebniswelt, Romanshorn
- Fondation Pierre Gianadda, Martigny
- Swiss Transport Museum

==== United Kingdom ====
===== England =====
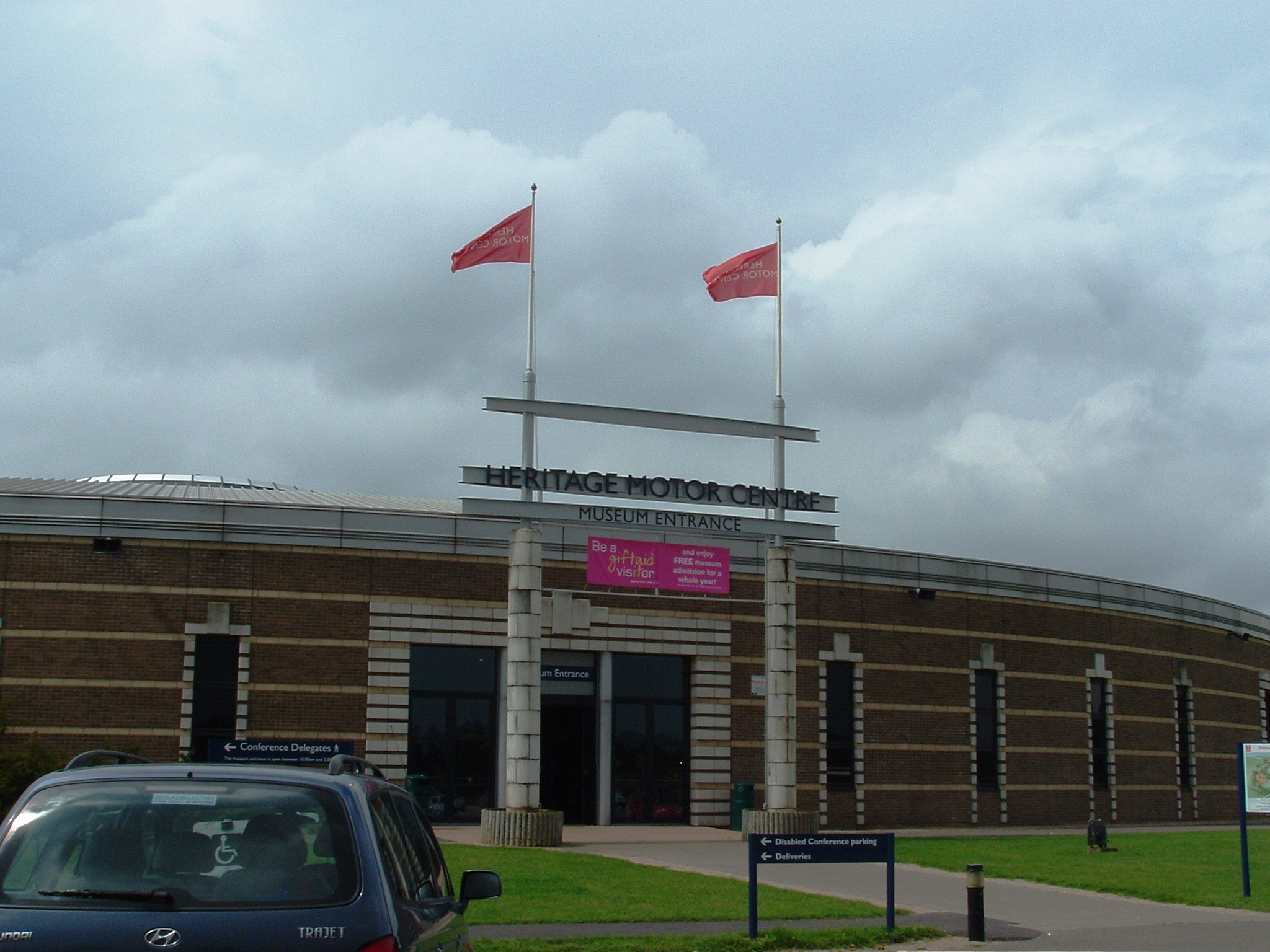
British Motor Museum, Gaydon, United Kingdom

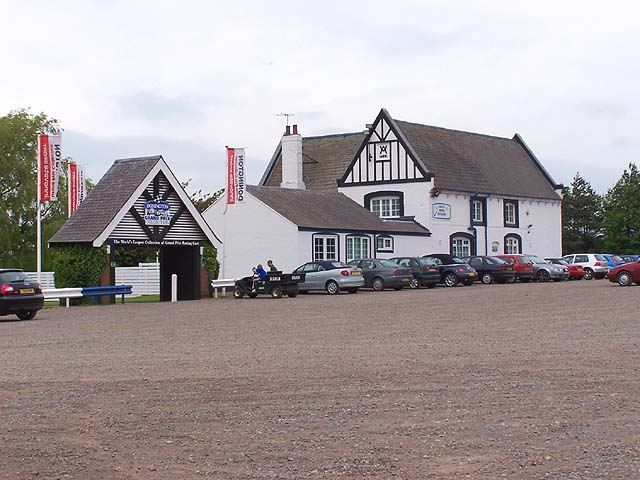
Donington Grand Prix Collection, Castle Donington, United Kingdom

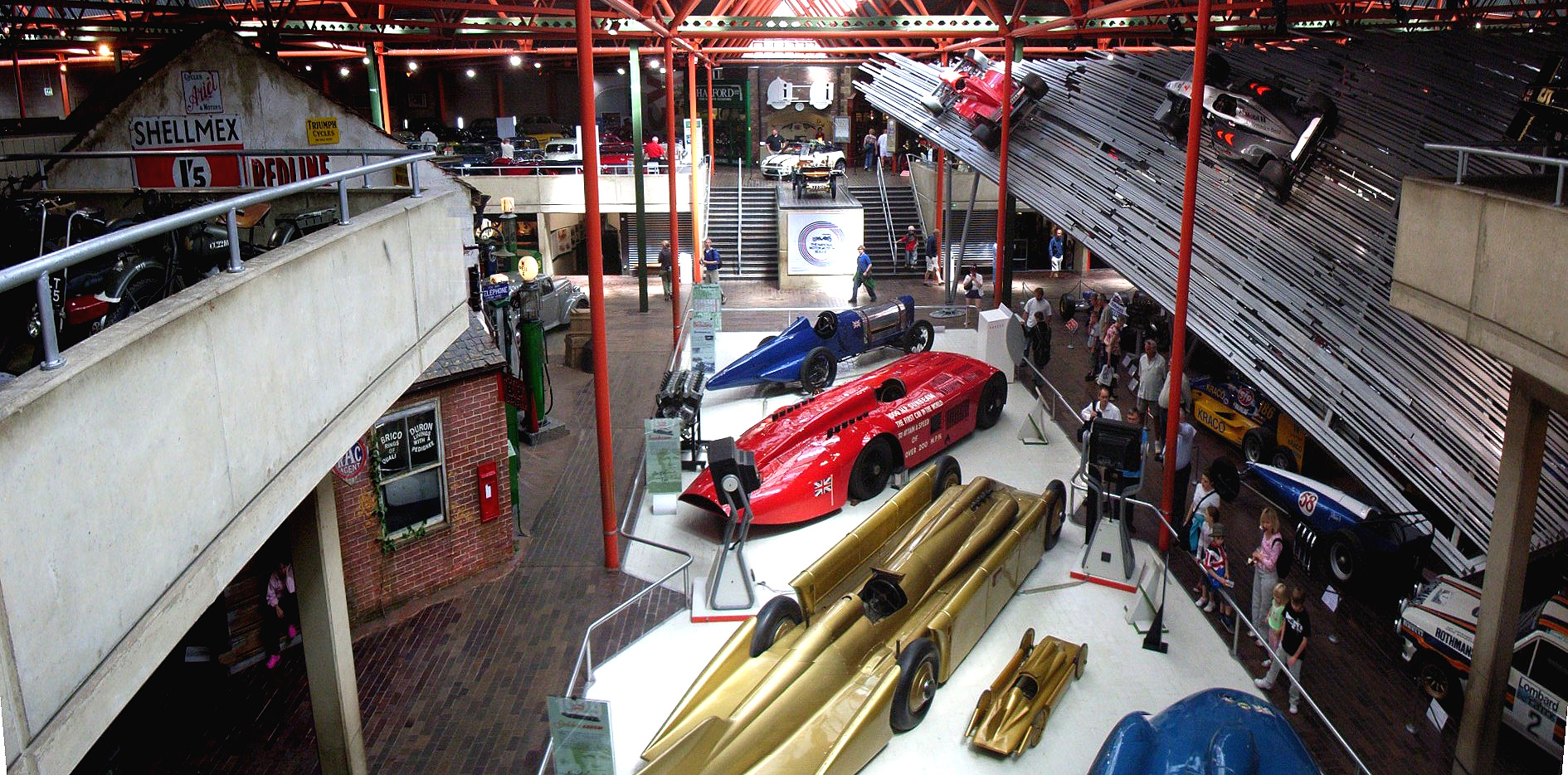
National Motor Museum, Beaulieu, United Kingdom

- Bentley Wildfowl and Motor Museum
- British Commercial Vehicle Museum
- British Motor Museum
- Brooklands Museum
- Bubble Car Museum, Langrick, Boston, England
- Cars of the Stars Motor Museum
- Cotswold Motoring Museum
- County Classics Motor Museum
- Coventry Transport Museum
- Donington Grand Prix Exhibition
- Great British Car Journey
- Haynes International Motor Museum
- Ipswich Transport Museum
- Lakeland Motor Museum
- London Motor Museum
- **Mercedes-Benz World** (Daimler AG)
- National Motor Museum, Beaulieu
- Oxford Bus Museum

===== Scotland =====
- Myreton Motor Museum
- Riverside Museum

===== Wales =====
- Llangollen Motor Museum
- Pembrokeshire Motor Museum

== North America ==
=== Canada ===
- Canadian Automotive Museum
- Canadian Transportation Museum and Heritage Village
- Manitoba Antique Automobile Museum
- Reynolds-Alberta Museum
- Steele Wheels Motor Museum

=== Cayman Islands ===
- Cayman Motor Museum

=== United States ===
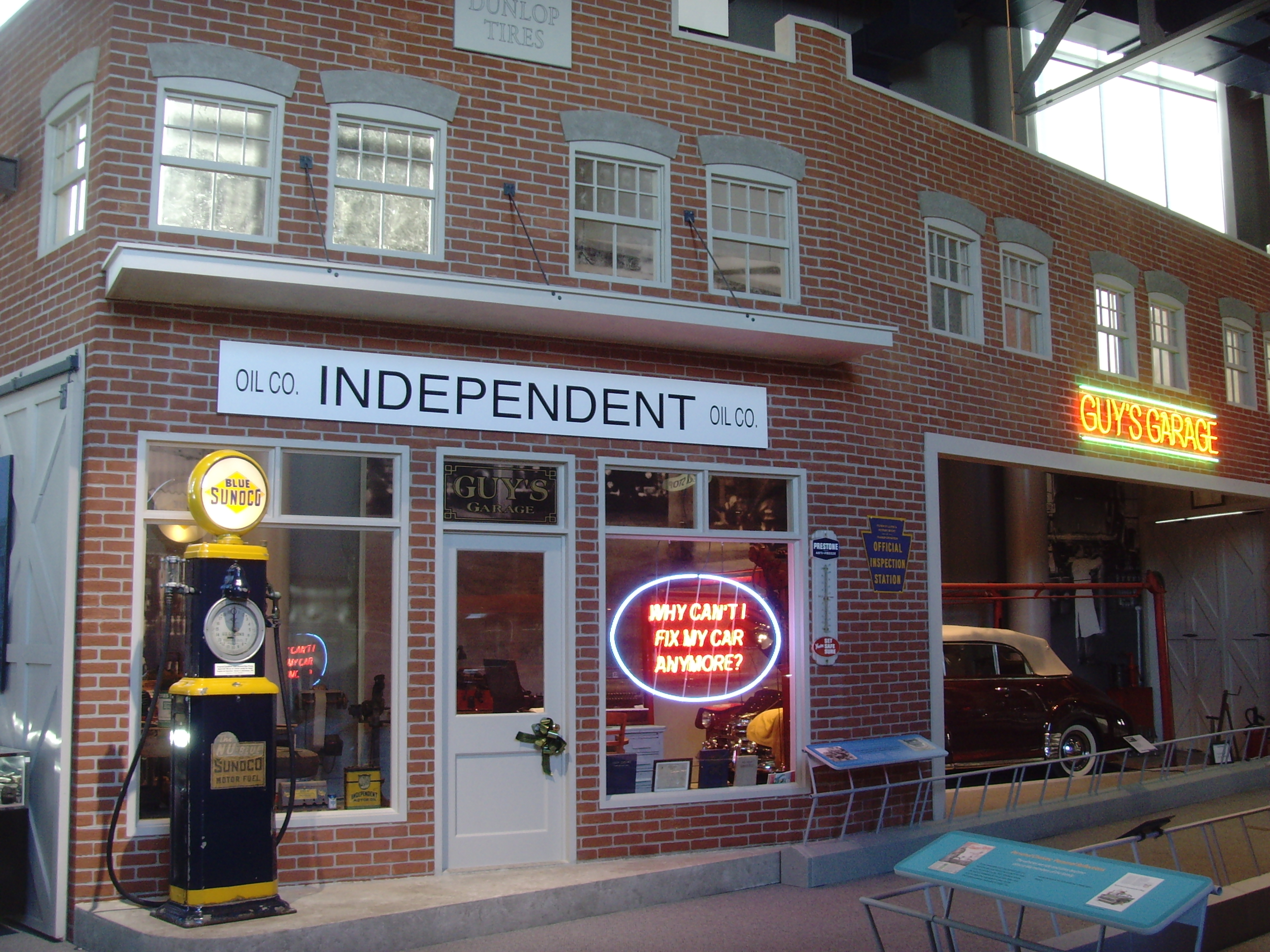
America On Wheels, Allentown, Pennsylvania, United States

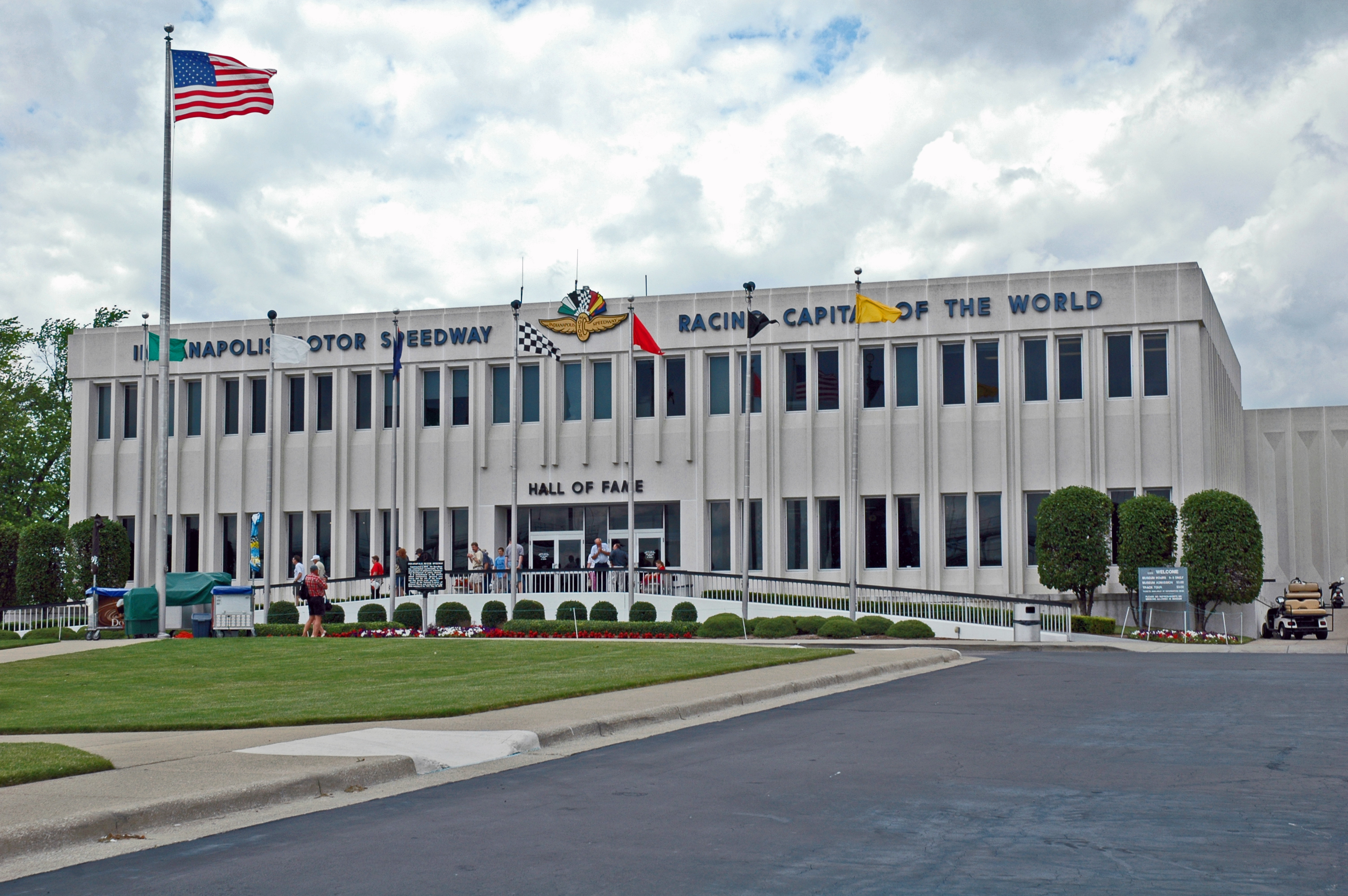
Indianapolis Motor Speedway Museum, Speedway, Indiana, United States

==== Eastern United States ====
- AACA Museum, Hershey, Pennsylvania
- America On Wheels, Allentown, Pennsylvania
- Audrain Automobile Museum, Newport, Rhode Island
- BMW CCA Foundation Museum, Greer, South Carolina
- BMW Zentrum, Greer, South Carolina
- Buffalo Transportation Pierce-Arrow Museum, Buffalo, New York
- Champlain Valley Transportation Museum, Plattsburgh, New York
- Cole Land Transportation Museum, Bangor, Maine
- Don Garlits Museum of Drag Racing, Ocala, Florida
- Fort Lauderdale Antique Car Museum, Fort Lauderdale, Florida
- Frick Car and Carriage Museum, Pittsburgh, Pennsylvania
- JWR Automobile Museum, Frackville, Pennsylvania
- Larz Anderson Auto Museum, Brookline, Massachusetts
- Memory Lane Motorsports & Historic Auto Museum, Mooresville, North Carolina
- Miami Auto Museum at the Dezer Collection, North Miami, Florida
- Miles Through Time Automotive Museum, Clarkesville, Georgia
- Muscle Car City, Punta Gorda, Florida
- Newport Car Museum, Portsmouth, Rhode Island
- Northeast Classic Car Museum, Norwich, New York
- Northeast Motorsports Museum, Loudon, New Hampshire
- Old Spokes Car Museum, New Smithville, Pennsylvania
- Orlando Auto Museum at Dezerland Park, Orlando, Florida
- Owls Head Transportation Museum, Owls Head, Maine
- Revs Institute, Naples, Florida
- Saratoga Automobile Museum, Saratoga Springs, New York
- Savoy Automobile museum, Cartersville, Georgia
- Seal Cove Auto Museum, Seal Cove, Maine
- Simeone Foundation Automotive Museum, Philadelphia, Pennsylvania
- Tallahassee Automotive Museum, Tallahassee, Florida
- Tampa Bay Automobile Museum, Pinellas Park, Florida
- The William E. Swigart, Jr. Antique Automobile Museum, Huntingdon, Pennsylvania

==== Central United States ====
- America's Packard Museum, Dayton, Ohio
- Antique Car Museum of Iowa, Coralville, Iowa
- Auburn Cord Duesenberg Automobile Museum, Auburn, Indiana
- Barber Vintage Motorsports Museum, Birmingham, Alabama
- Beller Museum, Romeoville, Illinois
- British Transportation Museum, Dayton, Ohio
- Canton Classic Car Museum, Canton, Ohio
- City Garage Car Museum, Greeneville, Tennessee
- Classic Car Collection, Kearney, Nebraska
- Crawford Auto-Aviation Museum, Cleveland, Ohio
- Crazy 80's Car Museum, Dwight, Illinois
- Dick's Classic Garage Car Museum, San Marcos, Texas (closed)
- Dream Car Museum, Evansville, Indiana
- Edge Motor Museum, Memphis, Tennessee
- Ford Piquette Avenue Plant, Detroit, Michigan
- Four States Auto Museum, Texarkana, Arkansas
- Gilmore Car Museum, Hickory Corners, Michigan
- **GM Heritage Center**, Sterling Heights, Michigan
- Hemken Collection, Williams, Iowa
- **Henry Ford Museum** (Ford Motor Company), Dearborn, Michigan
- Historic Attractions, Roscoe, Illinois
- Hostetler's Hudson Auto Museum, Shipshewana, Indiana. Closed in 2018
- Indianapolis Motor Speedway Museum, Speedway, Indiana
- Kansas City Automotive Museum, Olathe, Kansas
- Klairmont Kollections Automotive Museum, Chicago, Illinois. Closed in 2025
- Kokomo Automotive Museum, Kokomo, Indiana. Closed
- Lane Motor Museum, Nashville, Tennessee
- Midwest Dream Car Collection, Manhattan, Kansas
- Museum of American Speed, Lincoln, Nebraska
- National Auto and Truck Museum, Auburn, Indiana
- National Corvair Museum, Glenarm, Illinois
- National Corvette Museum, Bowling Green, Kentucky
- National Midget Auto Racing Hall of Fame, Sun Prairie, Wisconsin
- National Packard Museum, Warren, Ohio
- Pioneer Village, Minden, Nebraska
- Pontiac-Oakland Museum & Resource Center, Pontiac, Illinois
- R. E. Olds Transportation Museum, Lansing, Michigan
- Stahls Automotive Collection, Chesterfield, Michigan
- Studebaker National Museum, South Bend, Indiana
- Tupelo Automobile Museum, Tupelo, Mississippi
- Vehicle Vault Auto Gallery, Parker, Colorado
- Volo Auto Museum, Volo, Illinois
- **Walter P. Chrysler Museum** (Chrysler Group), Auburn Hills, Michigan. Closed
- Wellborn Musclecar Museum, Alexander City, Alabama
- Wheels O' Time Museum, Medina Township, Peoria County, Illinois
- Wills Sainte Claire Auto Museum, Marysville, Michigan
- Wisconsin Automotive Museum, Hartford, Wisconsin
- Ypsilanti Auto Heritage Museum, Ypsilanti, Michigan

==== Western United States ====
- Academy of Art University Automobile Museum, San Francisco, California
- America's Car Museum, Tacoma, Washington
- Automobile Driving Museum, El Segundo, California
- Blackhawk Automotive Museum, Danville, California
- California Automobile Museum, Sacramento, California
- Chandler Vintage Museum of Transportation and Wildlife, Oxnard, California. Closed
- Cussler Museum, Arvada, Colorado
- Fountainhead Antique Auto Museum, Fairbanks, Alaska
- The Franklin Auto Museum, Tucson, Arizona
- Gateway Auto Museum, Gateway, Colorado
- LeMay Family Collection, Tacoma, Washington
- Marconi Automotive Museum, Tustin, California
- Martin Auto Museum, Phoenix, Arizona
- Montana Auto Collection, Deer Lodge, Montana
- Mullin Automotive Museum, Oxnard, California. Closed
- Murphy Auto Museum, Oxnard, California
- Museum of Automobiles, Morrilton, Arkansas
- National Automobile Museum, Reno, Nevada
- The Nethercutt Collection, Sylmar, California
- American Heritage Museum Las Vegas, Nevada
- Nostalgia Street Rods, Goldstrom's Automobile Collection, Las Vegas, Nevada
- Penske Racing Museum, Phoenix, Arizona
- Petersen Automotive Museum, Los Angeles, California
- San Diego Automotive Museum, San Diego, California
- The Cobra Experience, Martinez, California
- Thunder Dome Car Museum, Enumclaw, Washington. Closed
- **Toyota USA Automobile Museum** (Toyota Motor Sales, U.S.A., Inc.), Torrance, California. Closed
- Western Antique Aeroplane & Automobile Museum, Hood River, Oregon
- Woodland Auto Display, Paso Robles, California
- World of Speed, Wilsonville, Oregon. Closed

== Oceania ==
=== Australia ===
- Australian Motorlife Museum
- Bus Museum of Western Australia
- Ford Discovery Centre
- Gosford Classic Car Museum
- Motor Museum of Western Australia
- National Automobile Museum of Tasmania
- National Military Vehicle Museum
- National Motor Museum
- National Motor Racing Museum
- National Road Transport Museum
- Sydney Bus Museum
- York Motor Museum

=== New Zealand ===
- Bill Richardson Transport World
- Museum of Transport and Technology
- National Transport and Toy Museum
- Nelson Classic Car Museum
- Omaka Classic Cars
- Southward Car Museum
- Warbirds and Wheels
- Yaldhurst Museum

== South America ==
=== Argentina ===
- Museo Juan Manuel Fangio

=== Brazil ===
- Museu do Automóvel do Ceará
- Museu do Automóvel de Curitiba

=== Chile ===
- Auto Museum Moncopulli, Casilla 204, Osorno, Región de los Lagos. 70 Studebakers and 70 other vintage cars.
