= Titus Museum =

The Titus Museum of Transportation and Collectibles
- Established: 2003; 23 years ago
- Location: Delhi, India
- Coordinates: 28.456°N 77.155°W
- Type: automobile museum
- Founder: Diljeet Titus

The Titus Museum is an automobile museum in Delhi, India. It displays vintage and classic car models from the personal collection of its founder Diljeet Titus.

== Collection ==
The collection contains vintage and classic cars belonging to the Maharajas of several Indian princely states. It includes 1933 Minerva Type AL, which once belonged to the Raja Sahib of Mahmudabad and the 1930 Stutz Series M 4 Passenger Speedster, which belonged to the Maharawal of Baria State.
