= Automuseum Vilnius =

Automobile museum

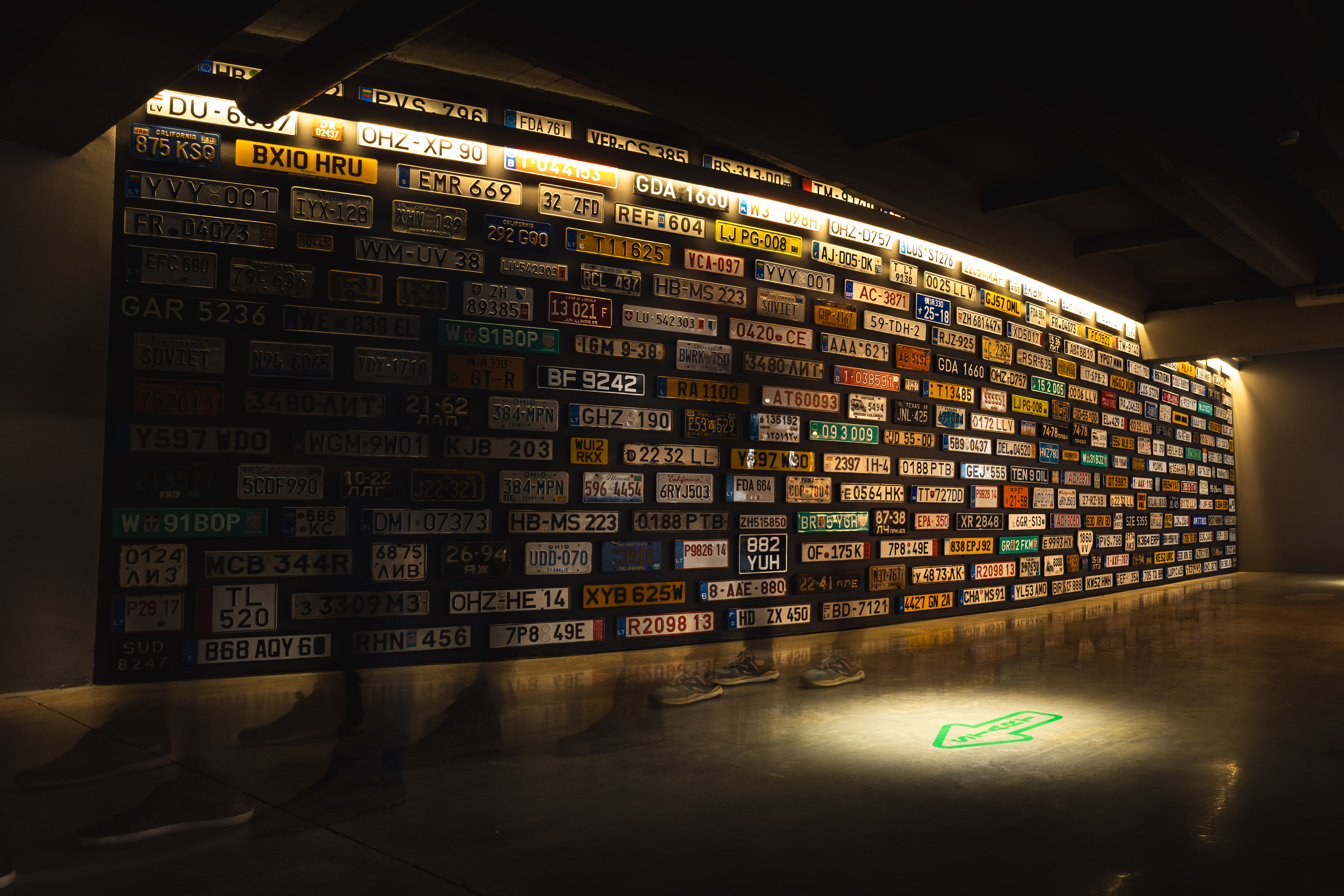
- Visitors in museum
- Established: 2023
- Location: Dariaus ir Girėno str. 2, Vilnius, Lithuania
- Coordinates: 54.665112°N 25.27355°E
- Type: Automobile museum
- Website: automuziejus.lt

Automuseum Vilnius (Lithuanian: Automuziejus Vilnius) - is a museum of historical cars, located in Vilnius, Lithuania, in the former Taxi Park at the intersection of Darius and Girėnas and Pelesas streets. The museum operates indoors. Founded with private funds, it opened in May 2023.

== History ==
The Automuseum Vilnius was opened in the reconstructed Taxi Park building (after reconstruction - T Park), built in 1974. The individual project of this building was prepared by the specialists of the Industrial Construction Design Institute. The most important element of the building is the monolithic reinforced concrete central ramp. These are two spiral ramps, composed in the center of the building, in an oval shaft of silicate bricks.

== Collection ==
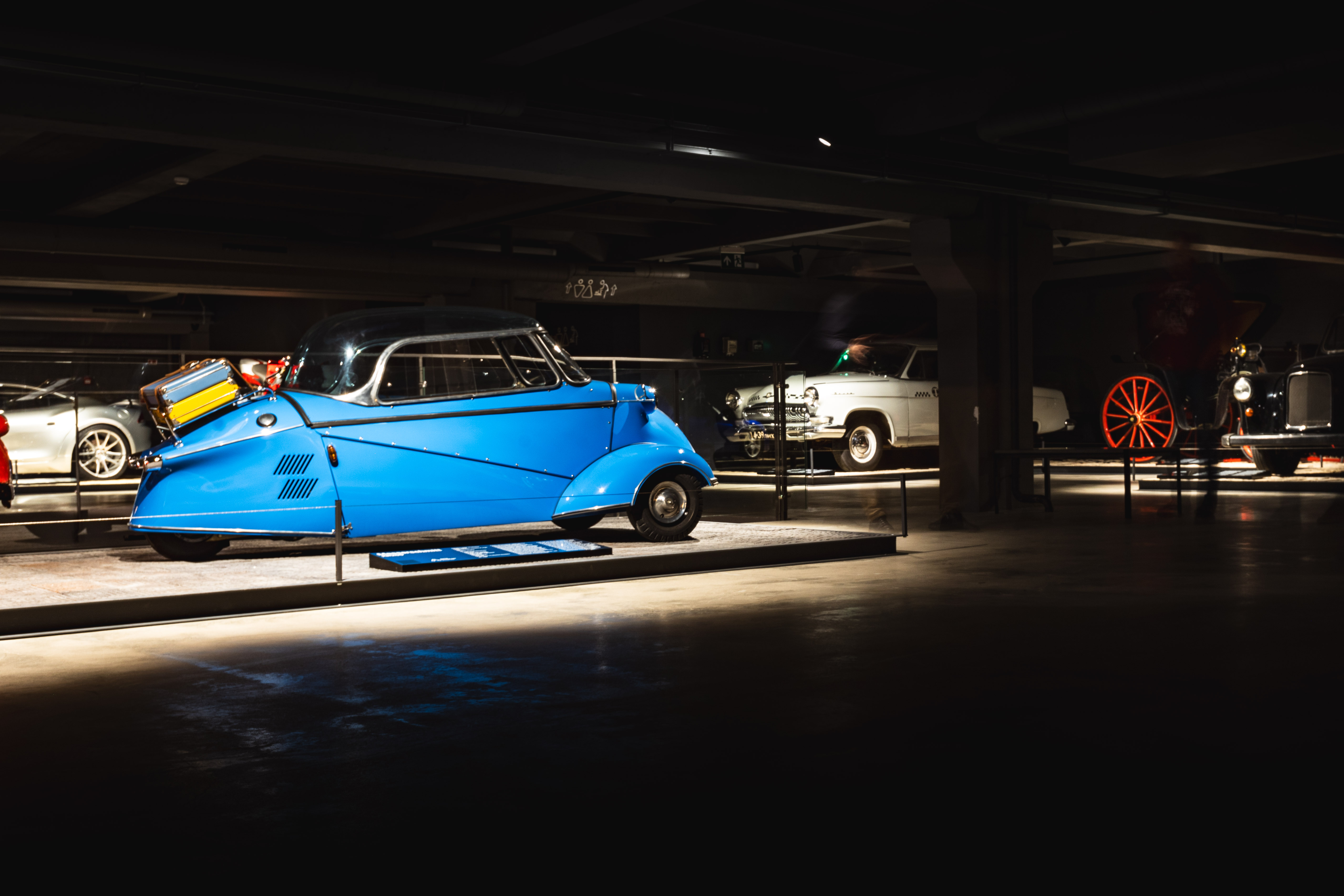
Automuseum Vilnius exhibition, Vilnius, Lithuania

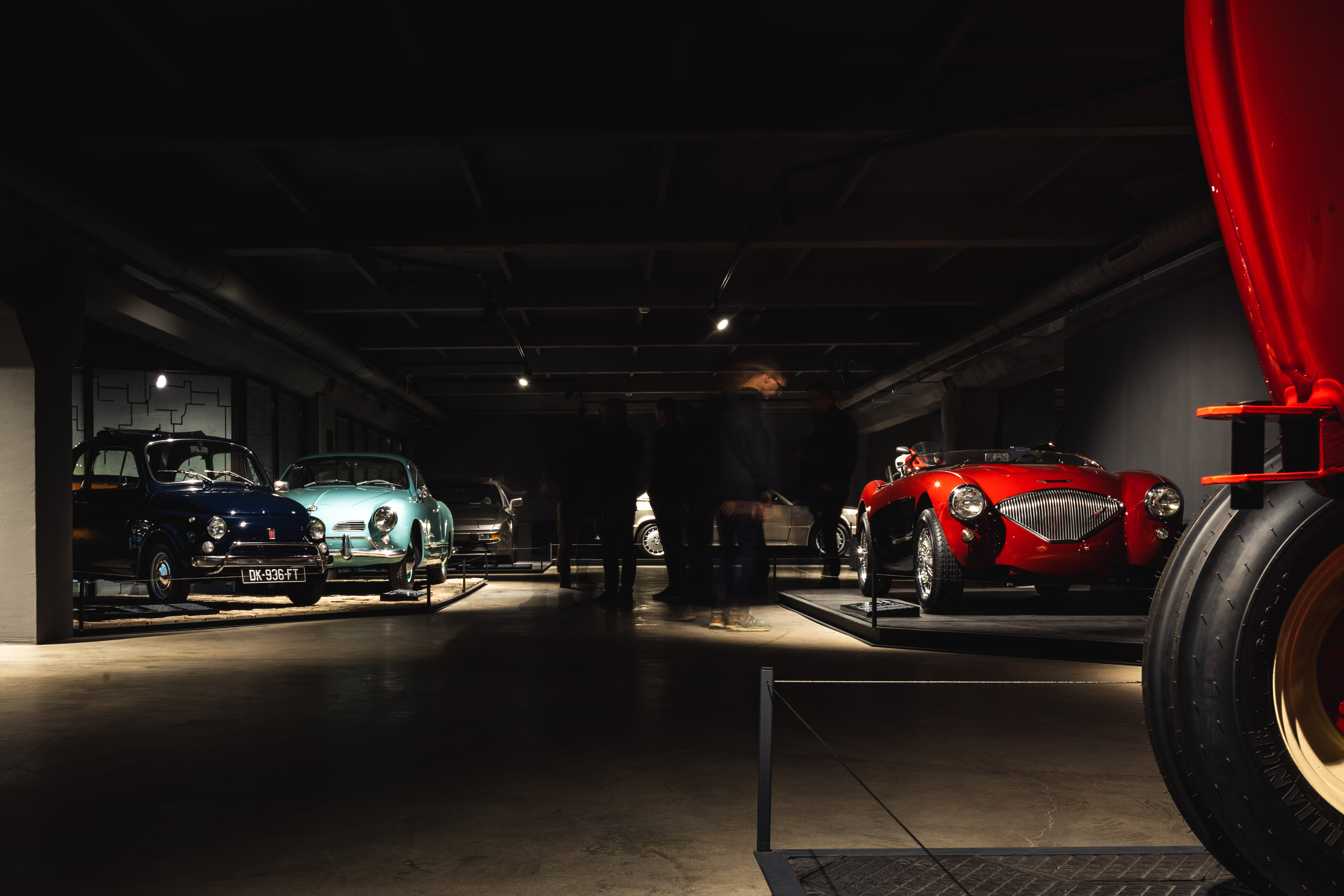
Automuseum Vilnius exhibition, Vilnius, Lithuania

Automuseum Vilnius exhibits more than 100 historical cars, motorcycles, and other equipment. In the museum, visitors can view historical exhibits which cover the development of used materials, design, and applied security elements. Among these exhibits are the following significant objects for Lithuania:

- Machines built by Stasys Brundza’s sports car manufacturing company,
- Formula 3 and 4 cars, operated in the Baltic States,
- The armored cars that transported the presidents of Lithuania,
- The motorcycle of the first Lithuanian biker Antanas Ilgauskas,
- An exhibit belonging to the King of Nepal and many others.
