= Ford Discovery Centre =

Automobile museum in Victoria, Australia

Coordinates: 38.1442°S 144.359°E

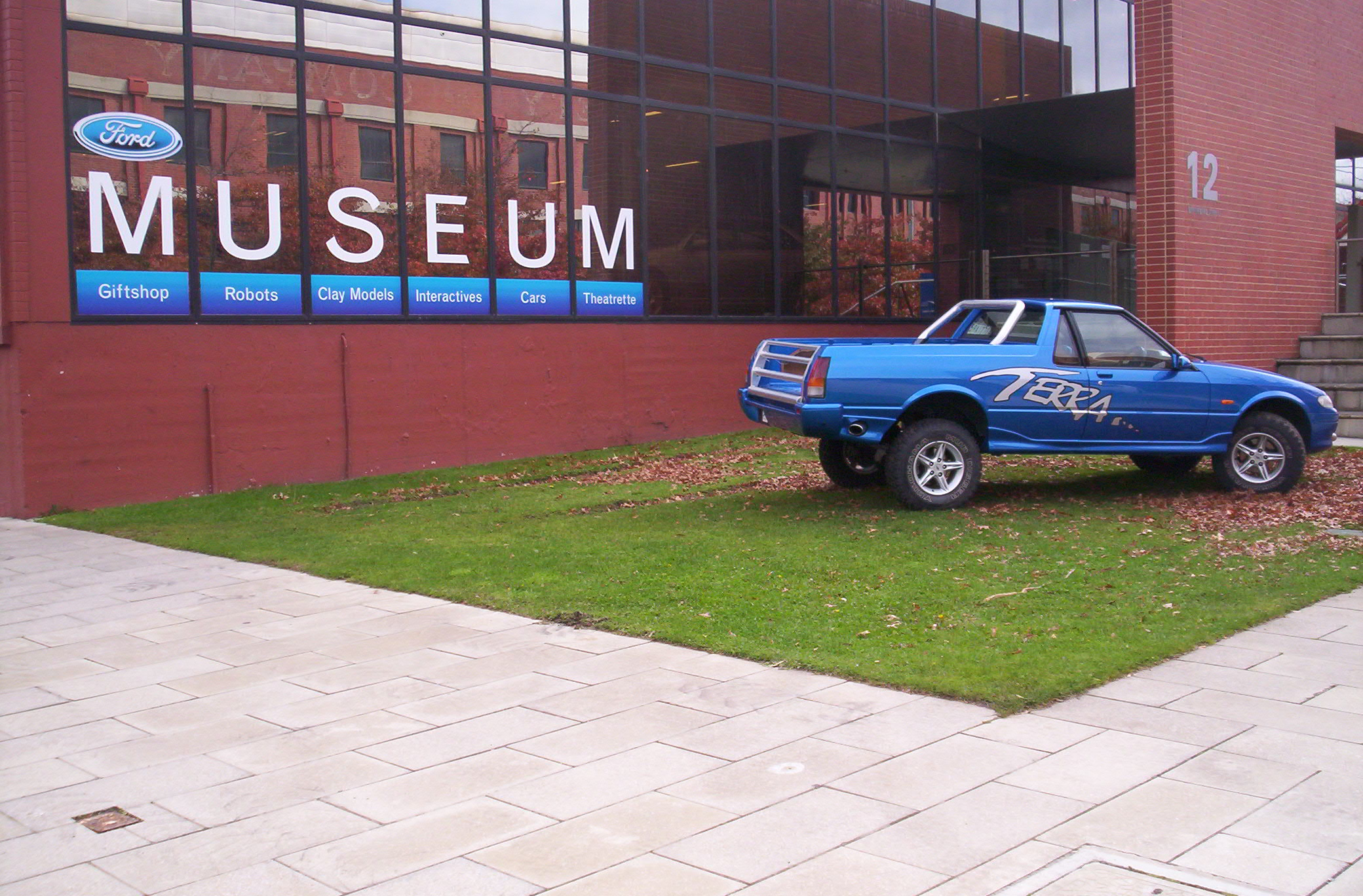
Exterior view of Ford Museum in Geelong

The Ford Discovery Centre was an interactive automobile museum located in Geelong, Victoria, Australia.

It was operated by Ford Heritage Ltd, a Not-for-Profit Trust set up to showcase and preserve the heritage of the Ford Motor Company in Australia.

== Overview ==
The museum, which extended over two floors, featured various Ford vehicles, a theatre and some car-related games and activities.

It was opened to the public by Jeff Kennett in April 1999. Around 20,000 visitors a year attended the centre.

== Closing ==
The centre closed its doors to the public on 29 July 2012 (14 years ago).

== See also ==
- Australian Racing Museum
- List of automobile museums
- National Motor Racing Museum
- National Road Transport Museum
