= Savoy Automobile museum =

Automotive Museum

Savoy Automobile Museum
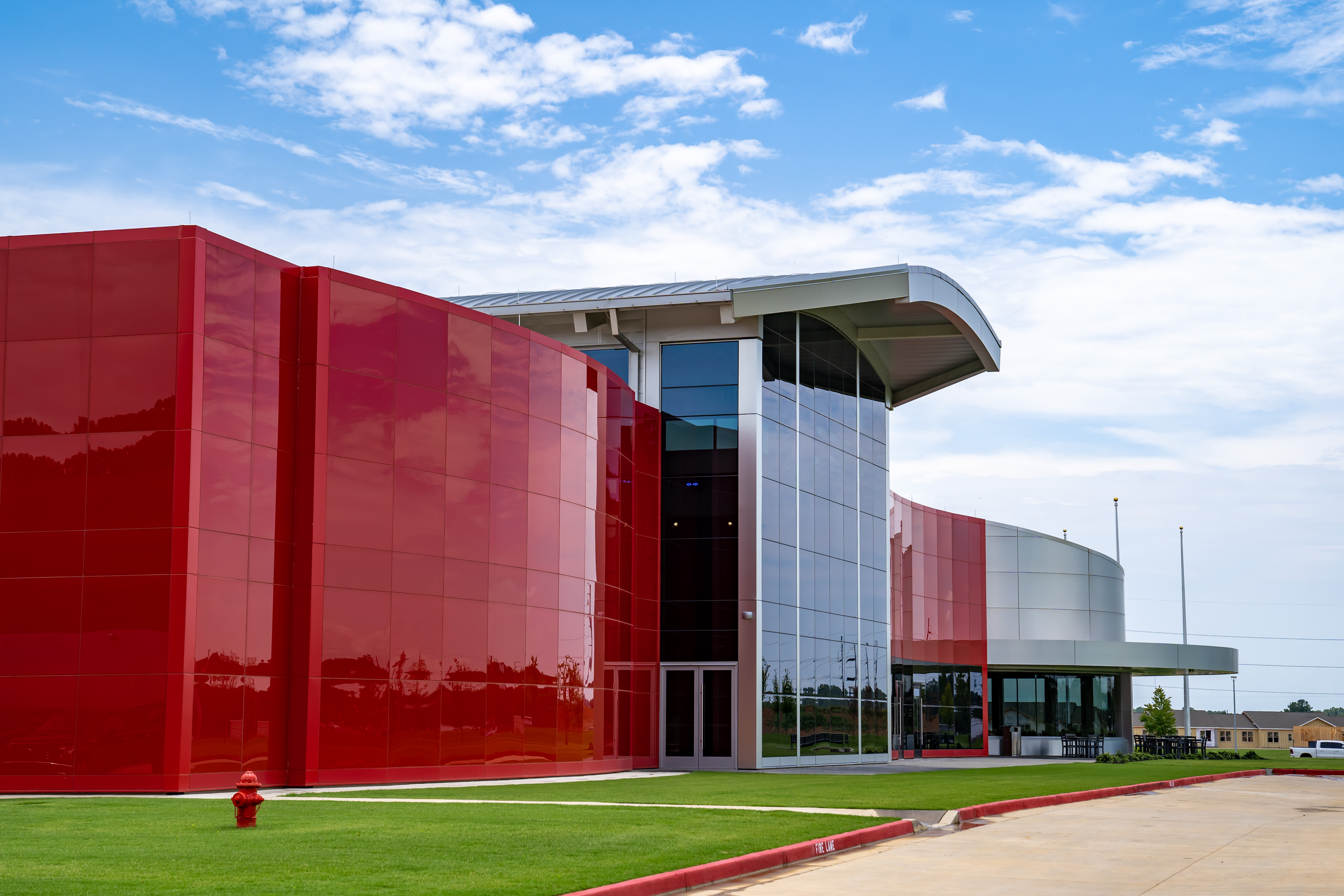
- Established: December 8, 2021
- Location: Cartersville, Georgia
- Type: Automotive museum
- Website: savoymuseum.org

The Savoy Automobile Museum, colloquially known as the Savoy, is an automotive museum which opened in December 2021 in Cartersville, Georgia, about 45 miles northwest of Atlanta. The museum takes its name from the rusted remains of a 1954 Plymouth Savoy, which was discovered half-buried on the museum site, during its initial construction phase.

The 65,000 square foot facility is situated on approximately 37 acres, and includes five galleries, a vehicle storage building, an outdoor pavilion, and grounds designed to accommodate car shows, concerts, cruise-ins, swap meets, and car club gatherings.

The museum has rotating automotive exhibits, with an average of 12 different exhibits annually — with some galleries also featuring automotive art. The museum also holds an annual car show called The Connection.

The Savoy is operated by Georgia Museums Inc., a nonprofit that also operates the Bartow History Museum, Booth Western Art Museum and Tellus Science Museum.
