= Automobile Driving Museum =

Automotive museum in El Segundo, California

Coordinates: 33.924643°N 118.392109°W

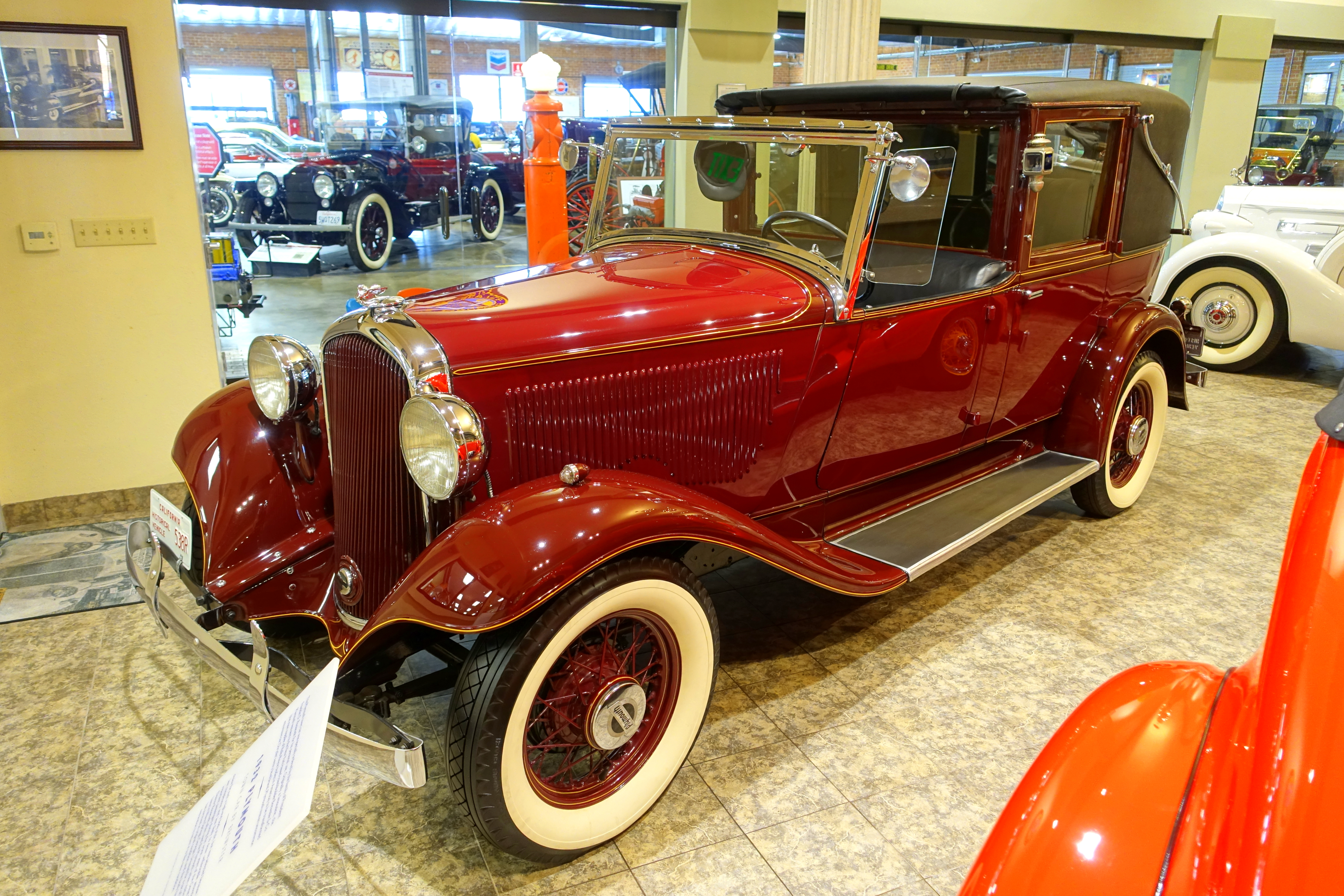
1932 Plymouth Brewster Town Car, a Deluxe Sedan customized by Brewster & Co. for the family of President Franklin Delano Roosevelt

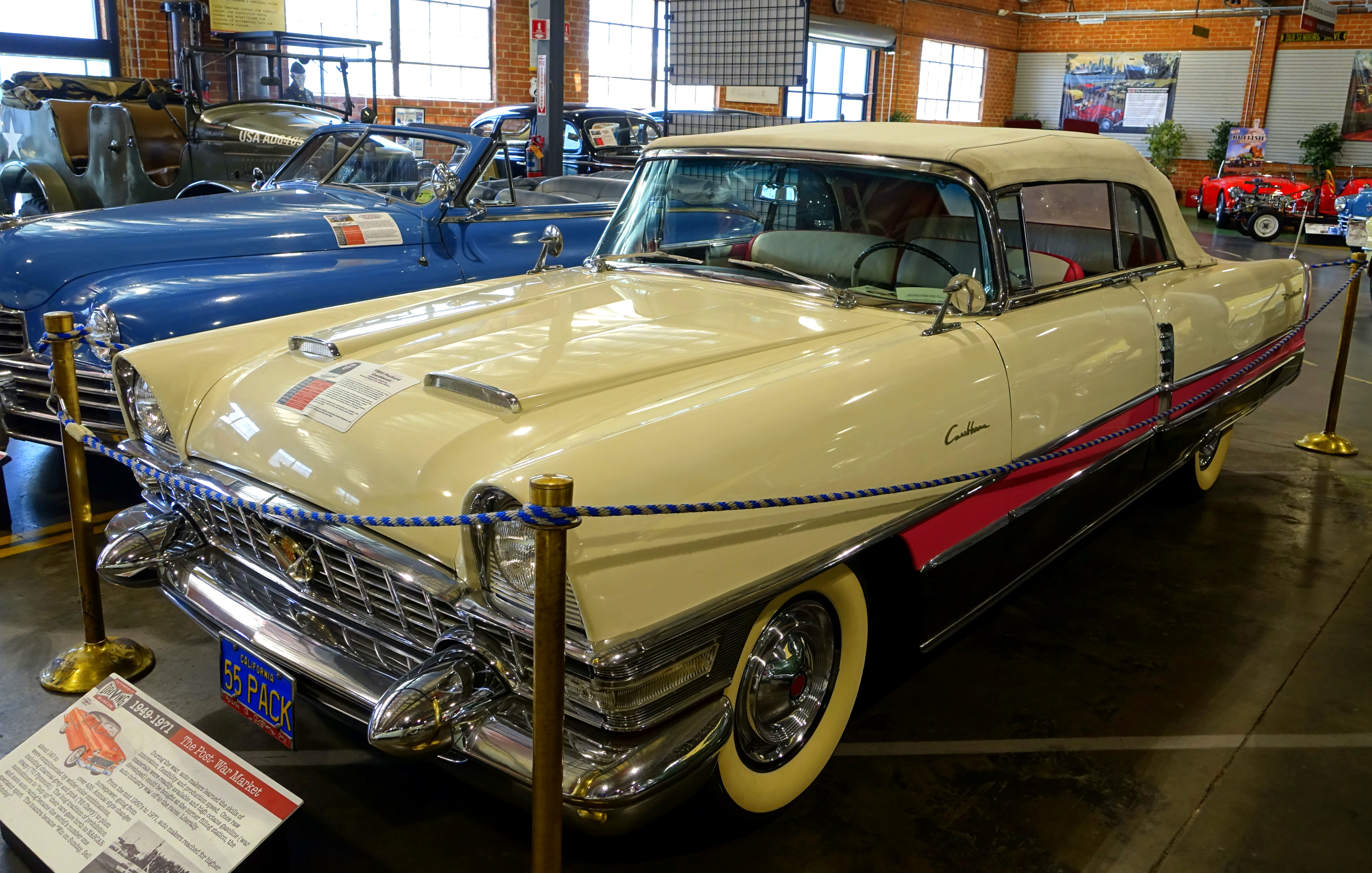
1955 Packard Caribbean, Model 5588, bought by Howard Hughes for Jean Peters

The Automobile Driving Museum was an automotive museum located at 610 Lairport Street, El Segundo, California, USA.

The museum was a nonprofit 501(c)(3) organization, founded in 2002 (24 years ago) by car collectors Stanley Zimmerman and architect Earl Rubenstein. Its mission was to "collect, preserve, exhibit and ride in historic vehicles." It contained about 130 classic, antique, and vintage automobiles created between 1886 and 2000, of which roughly half were on display at any time. Visitors were permitted to touch and sit in most cars, and on Sunday Car Rides, experience riding as a passenger around the neighborhood in classic vehicles. Its collection included:

- 1932 Plymouth Brewster Town Car, owned by Eleanor Roosevelt
- 1936 Packard touring phaeton, given by Franklin Delano Roosevelt to Joseph Stalin
- 1955 Packard Caribbean Convertible, given by Howard Hughes to his wife, Jean Peters

The museum closed in October 2024 after the passing of its primary benefactor.
