= World of Speed (Wilsonville, Oregon) =

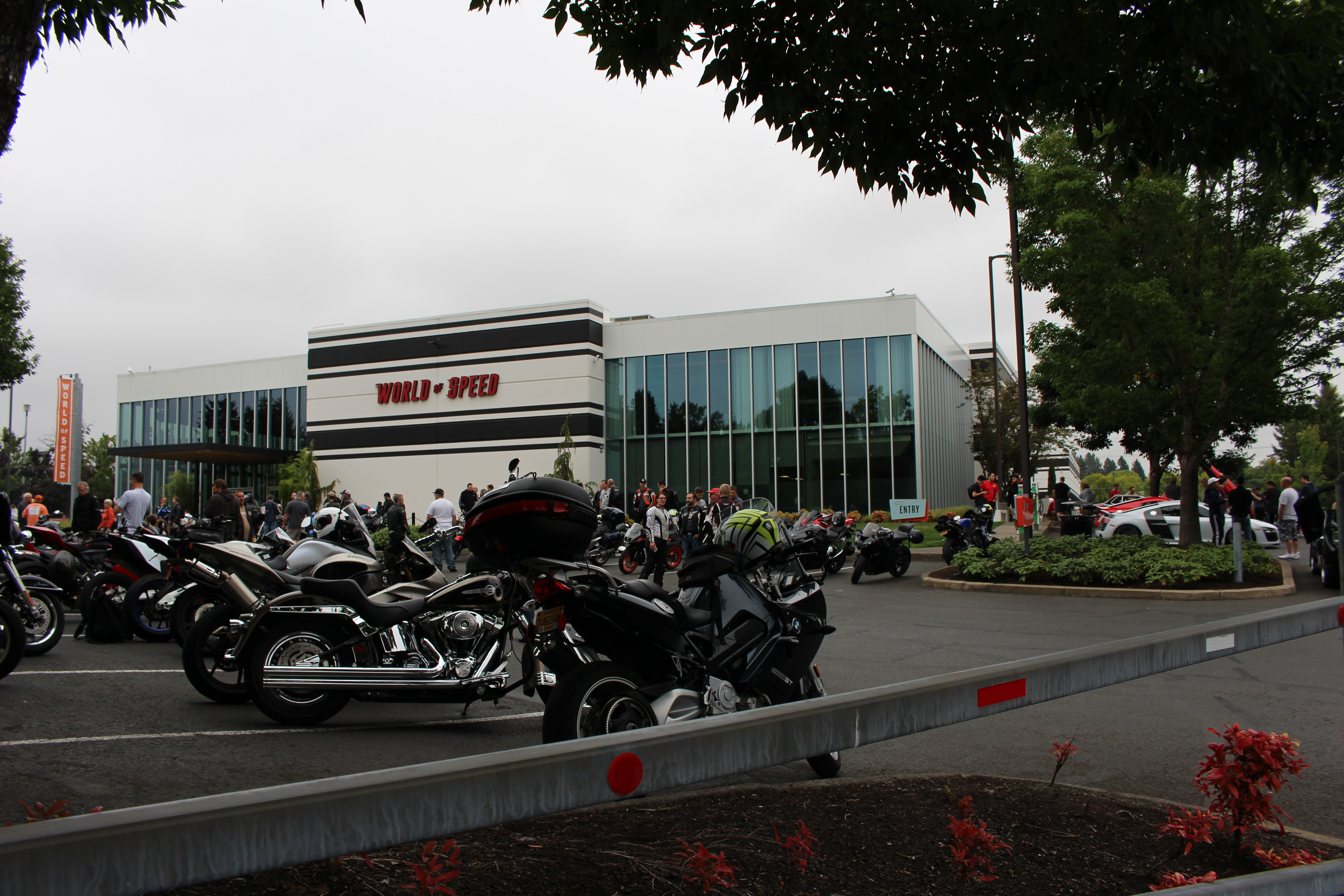
- Portland Cars and Coffee held at World of Speed, September 7, 2019
- Established: April 2015; 11 years ago
- Dissolved: May 2020; 6 years ago
- Location: Wilsonville, Oregon, U.S.
- Coordinates: 45°19′16.9″N 122°46′15.8″W
- Type: Automotive
- Visitors: 51,000 (2018)

World of Speed was an automotive museum in Wilsonville, Oregon.

== History ==
The museum was founded in April 2015. In 2018, World of Speed hosted more than 51,000 visitors and generated $340,000 in admission and program fees. The museum closed in 2020, during the COVID-19 pandemic.

== See also ==
- List of automotive museums
