= Cyprus Historic and Classic Motor Museum =

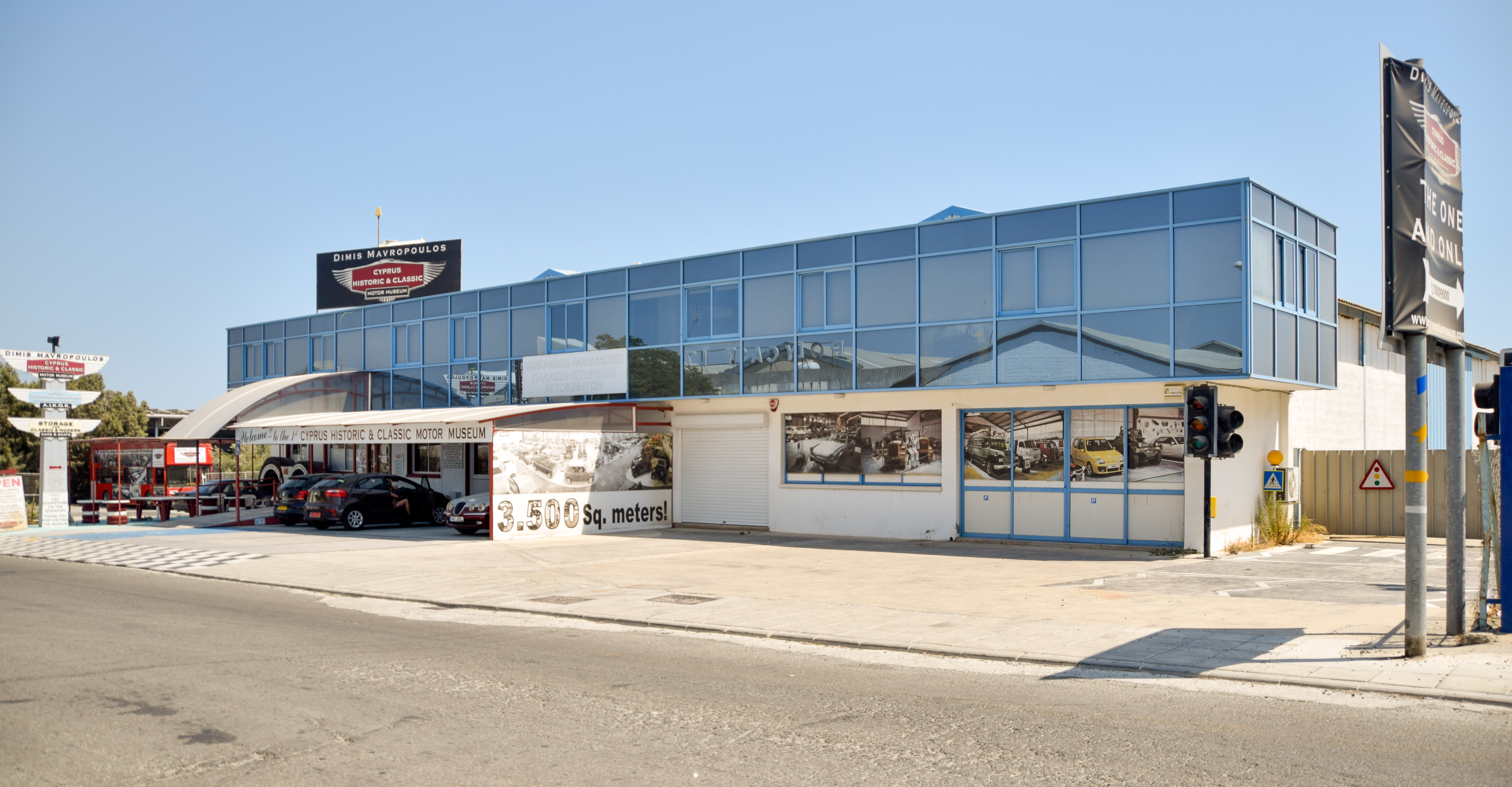
- The Cyprus Classic Motorcycle Museum in 2021
- Established: February 2014; 12 years ago
- Location: Epimitheos; Limassol 3056; Cyprus
- Coordinates: 34.6658°N 32.9936°E
- Type: Automobile museum
- Website: cyprusmotormuseum.com.cy (in English)

The Cyprus Historic and Classic Motor Museum is an automobile museum in Limassol, Cyprus that opened in February 2014. It covers the history of automobile and commercial vehicle use in Cyprus since the first automobiles arrived on the island.

The museum building is located in a commercial area of Limassol and has an exhibition area of 3,500 m^{2} (38,000 sq ft) with more than 120 classic and historic vehicles and collectible automobiles.

In addition to road vehicles, agricultural vehicles and engines will also be on display. Basically, the Cyprus Historic and Classic Motor Museum consists of the personal vehicle collection of the Cypriot rally competitor Dimi Mavropoulos who founded the museum specifically to display his vehicle collection which kept growing constantly.

The museum highlights the cultural significance of the development and growth of the global automotive industry and includes a 1912 Ford T-Roadster as well as many modern vehicles that originated on Cypriot roads.
