= Pembrokeshire Motor Museum =

Museum that exhibited a range of restored vintage cars

Coordinates: 51.8319006°N 5.0594587°W

The Pembrokeshire Motor Museum used to exhibit a range of restored vintage cars. It was located at Simpson Cross, in Pembrokeshire, West Wales on the A487 road, about 4 miles (6.4 km) from Haverfordwest. The museum displayed over 40 vehicles covering the history of the motor car.

The privately owned museum was opened in 2000 by Mike Richards. The exhibitions included displays of model vehicles, motorcycles, bicycles, signs and other ephemera, a dining area and bar, video and magazine lounge and a play area for young people.
