= Al Ain Classic Car Museum =

Automotive museum in the United Arab Emirates

Coordinates: 24.0881872°N 55.722386°E

The Al Ain Classic Car Museum is an automotive museum in the United Arab Emirates, dedicated to the display of classic and heritage cars. It is located in the city of Al Ain near Jebel Hafeet.

== The museum ==
The museum started as a small collection of personal and Abu Dhabi Classic Car Club member cars in 2009. While in its early days it was sheltered under a khaima, a traditional Arabic tent, the collection occupies a total surface of 2,000 square metres (22,000 sq ft) and is divided into two levels. The museum houses over 40 classic cars and numerous brochures on the technical aspects of the vehicles.

== Museum collection ==
The museum includes examples of the following cars:

- Ford Model A
- Chevrolet Series 490
- MG J-type Midget
- Ford Model T
- Honda CB175
- Honda ATC250R
- Audi Quattro
- Audi Coupé (B2)
- Ford Mustang (first generation)
- Chevrolet Corvette (C3)
- Chevrolet C/K
- Chevrolet Camaro (third generation)
- Dodge Charger (B-body)
- Toyota Land Cruiser (J40)
- Land Rover Series I, II, IIa and III
- Mercedes W108
- Mercedes-Benz W111
- Mercedes-Benz 450SEL 6.9
- Mercedes-Benz R107 and C107
- Plymouth Fury
- Range Rover Classic
- Suzuki Jimny LJ10
- Volkswagen Beetle
- General Lee (car)
- Dodge Super Bee
