= Omaka Classic Cars =

Car collection

Coordinates: 41.537°S 173.928°E

Omaka Classic Cars displays a collection of more than one hundred cars all built in the second half of the 20th century. The collection's building is next to the building of the Omaka Aviation Heritage Centre in Omaka, Blenheim, New Zealand. The cars have been gathered by one of the trustees of Marlborough Motoring Trust which runs the collection.

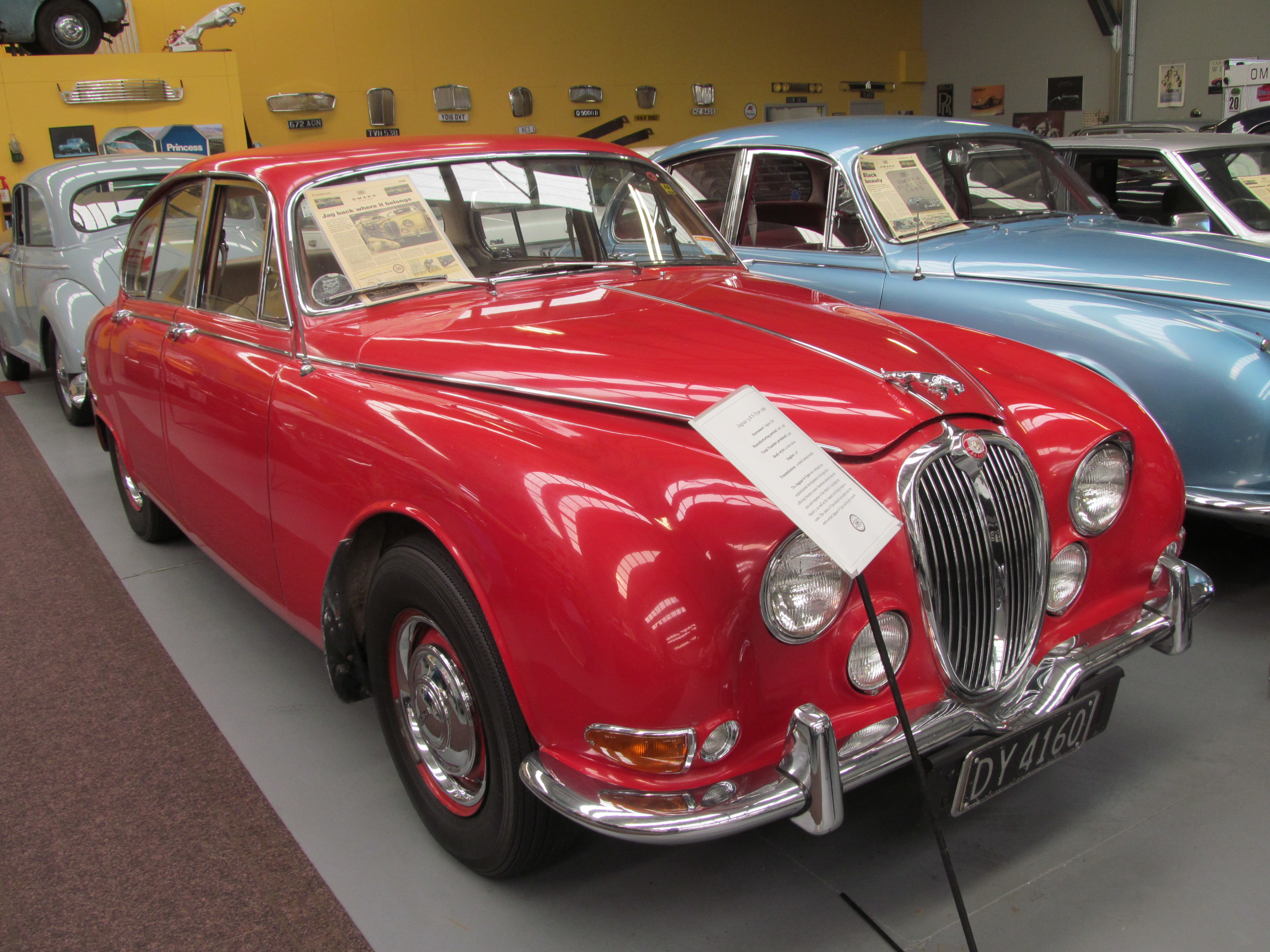
1966 Jaguar 3.8 (S Type)

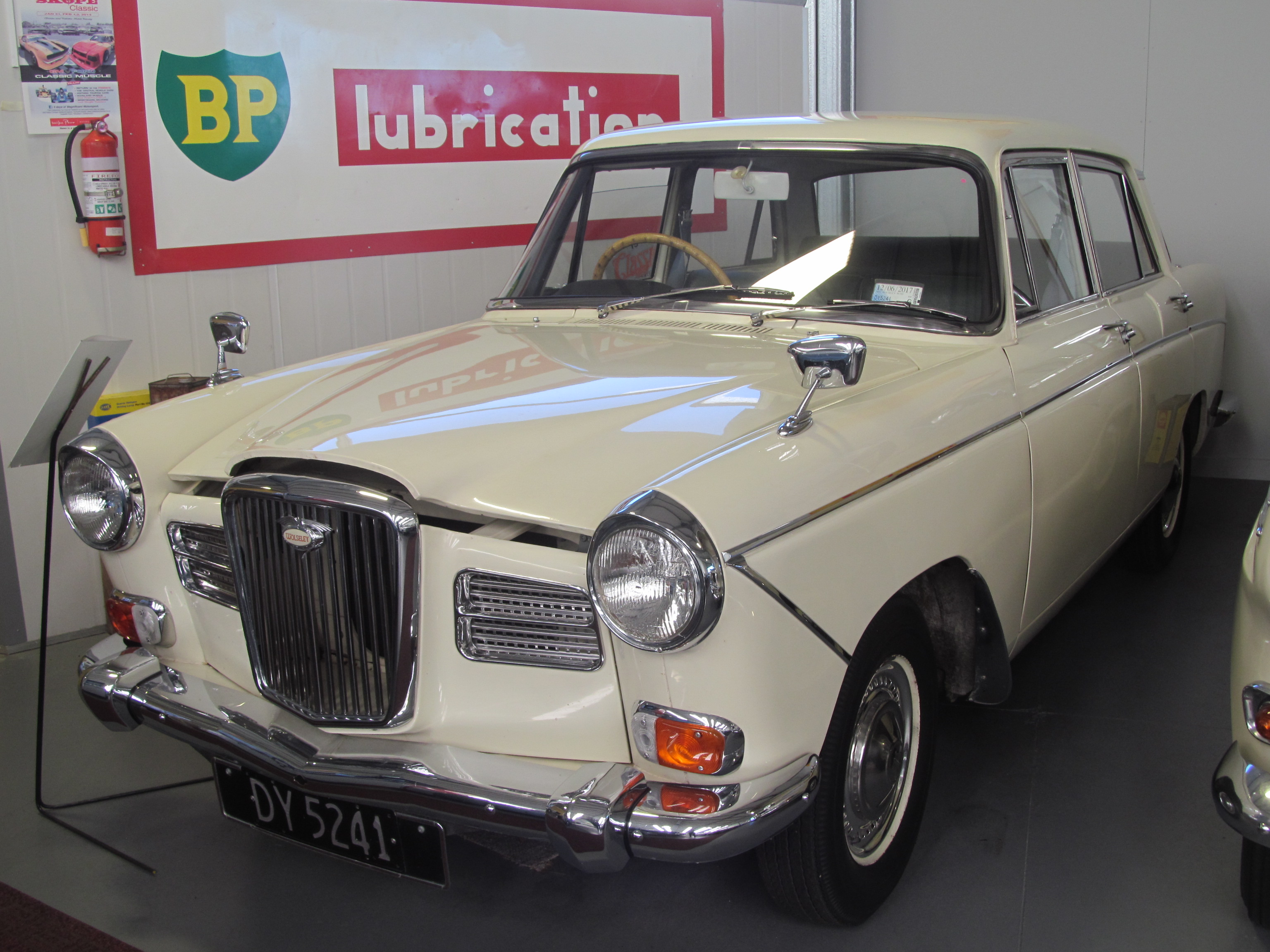
1967 Wolseley 16-60

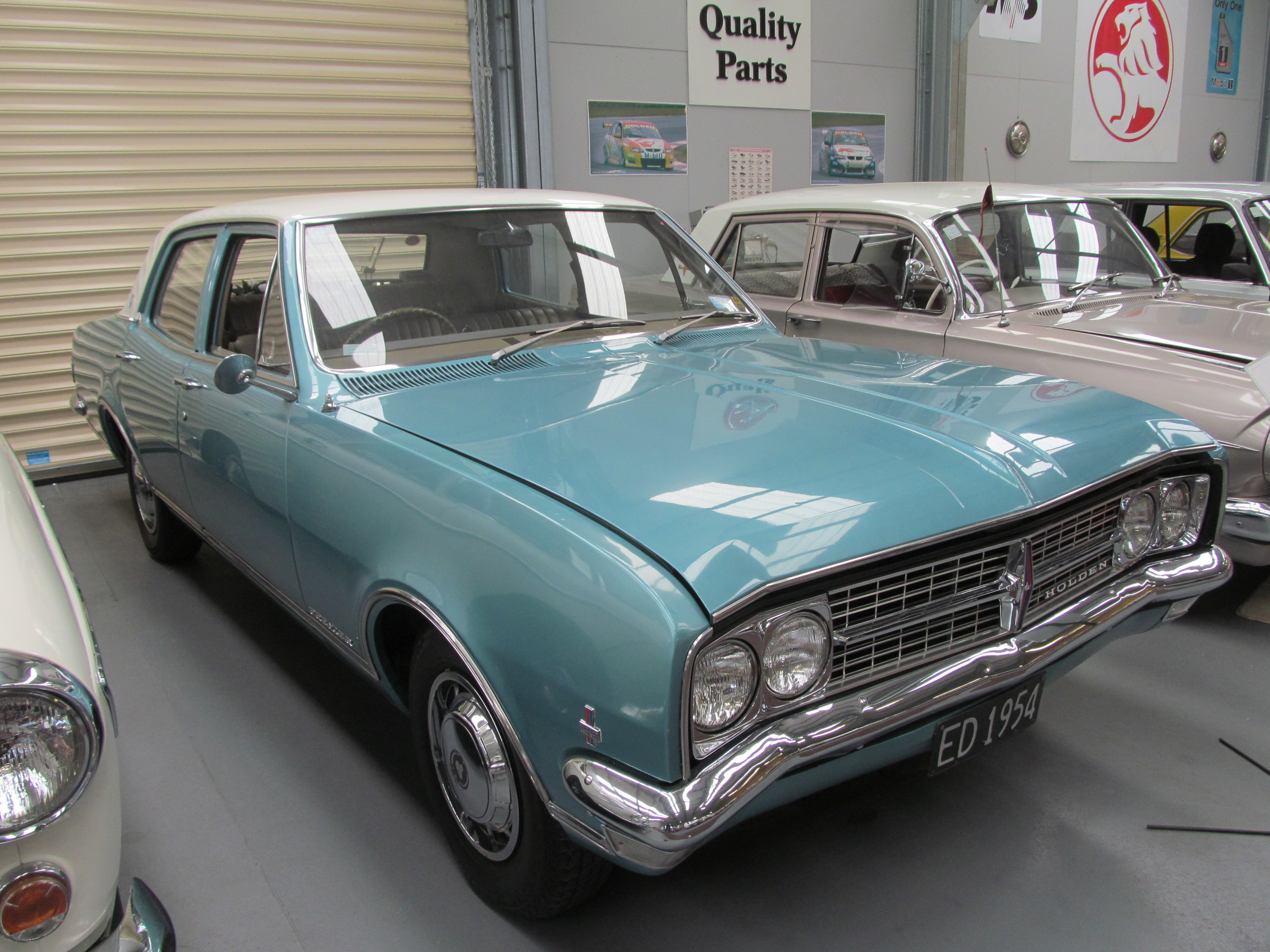
1968 Holden Premier (HK)

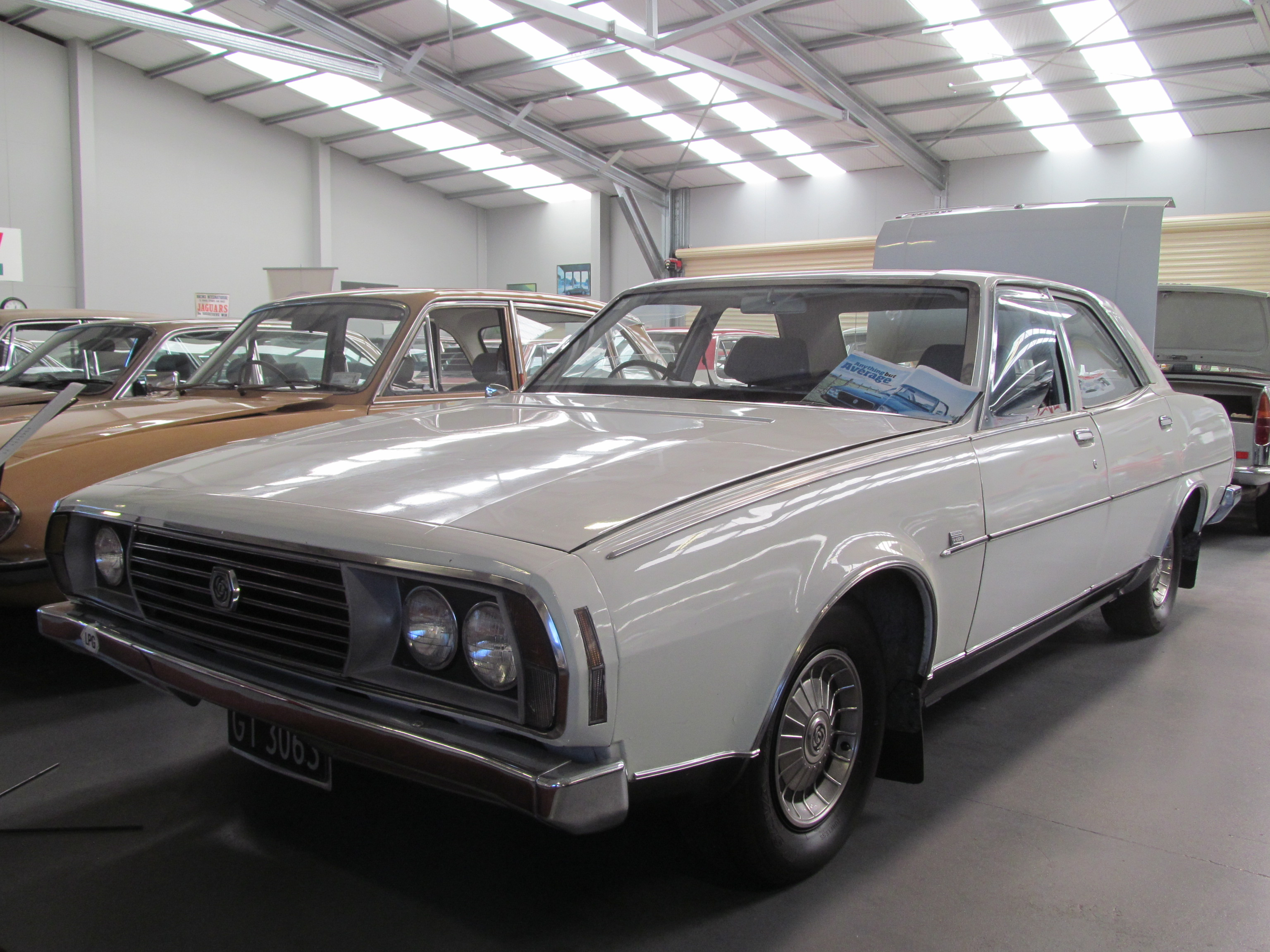
1974 Leyland P76 Super
