= Göran Karlsson's Motor Museum =

Museum in Sweden

Coordinates: 57°8′14″N 12°42′35″E

Göran Karlsson's Motor Museum is a museum of classic cars and motorcycles, opened in Sweden in 2007 and closed in 2010.

Göran Karlsson started Gekås in Ullared, Sweden in 1963 which today is the largest big-box store in Scandinavia. He was a dedicated collector. The museum has a number of cars of different brands and marques, such as Lamborghini and Chevrolet, where one of the museum's most precious cars is an Excalibur SS Series 1 Roadster that once belonged to the Swedish boxer Ingemar Johansson.
