= List of museums in the Northern Territory =

This list of museums in the Northern Territory, Australia contains museums which are defined for this context as institutions (including nonprofit organizations, government entities, and private businesses) that collect and care for objects of cultural, artistic, scientific, or historical interest and make their collections or related exhibits available for public viewing. Also included are non-profit art galleries and university art galleries.

Name	Location	Type	Summary
Adelaide House	Alice Springs	Medical	website, information, bush nursing hostel designed by John Flynn and operated by the Australian Inland Mission
Adelaide River railway station	Adelaide River	Railway	Preserved historic railway station and railway artefacts
Araluen Arts Centre	Alice Springs	Art	Includes four galleries
Australian Aviation Heritage Centre	Winnellie, Northern Territory	Aerospace	website
Batchelor Museum	Batchelor	Local history	website, museum under development
Battery Hill Mining Centre	Tennant Creek	Mining	information, information, includes underground mine tour, gold stamp, minerals museum, social history museum
Black Point Culture Centre	Cobourg Peninsula	Local history	information, located at the Black Point Ranger Station within the Garig Ganuk Barlu National Park
Central Australian Aviation Museum	Alice Springs	Aerospace	website, includes early flying doctor planes, historic aircraft and aviation memorabilia
Charles Darwin University Nursing Museum	Darwin	Nursing	
Darwin Military Museum	Darwin	Military	Artefacts from Darwin's military history during World War II
Fannie Bay Gaol	Darwin	Prison	
Fred McKay Museum	Alice Springs	Biographical	website, information, part of St Philip's College, life and work of Rev. Fred McKay to bring medicine and education to the bushlands
Hartley Street School	Alice Springs	Education	website, operated by the National Trust North Territory, early 20th century school
Jones Store	Newcastle Waters	Local history	information
Katherine Museum	Katherine	Local history	website
Katherine Railway Museum	Katherine	Railway	information
Larrimah Museum	Larrimah	Railway	information, railway during World War II and post-war transport history
Lyons Cottage	Darwin	Local history	website, information
Mbantua Art Gallery and Cultural Museum	Alice Springs	Art	website
Museum and Art Gallery of the Northern Territory	Darwin	Multiple	Main museum in the Northern Territory, region's art, history, culture and natural history
Museum of Central Australia	Alice Springs	Natural history	website, Central Australian birds, mammals, reptiles, insects, rocks, minerals, fossils
Women's Museum of Australia and Old Alice Springs Gaol	Alice Springs	Women's history, Old Gaol history	Women in Australia's heritage, Old Gaol and Labour Camp stories
National Road Transport Hall of Fame	Alice Springs	Transportation	Trucks, military vehicles
National Trust Museum Pine Creek	Pine Creek	Local history	information
Never Never Museum	Mataranka	Local history	information, information
Northern Territory Chinese Museum	Darwin	Ethnic	website, operated by the Chung Wah Society, Chinese work and achievements since they first arrived as indentured labourers in 1874, located on the grounds of a Chinese temple
Nyinkka Nyunyu Art and Culture Centre	Tennant Creek	Art	website, Aboriginal art and culture
O'Keeffe Residence	Katherine	Local history	information
Old Ghan Heritage Railway and Museum	Alice Springs	Railway museum	Includes a tourist railway
Old Police Station Museum	Borroloola	Local history	information
Old Timers Traeger Museum	Alice Springs	Local history	information
Pine Creek railway station	Pine Creek	Railway	Preserved historic railway station and railway artefacts
Royal Flying Doctor Service Museum	Alice Springs	Medical	website, history of the Royal Flying Doctor Service
The Residency, Alice Springs	Alice Springs	Historic house	Home to former administrators of the Northern Territory
School of the Air Visitor Centre	Alice Springs	Education	website, history and methods of the School of the Air
Strehlow Research Centre	Alice Springs	Ethnographic	Artefacts from the Strehlow Collection of indigenous central Australian ethnographic objects and archival materials
Timber Creek Police Station and Museum	Timber Creek	Law enforcement	information, also includes local history displays
Tuxworth-Fullwood House	Tennant Creek	Local history	information, information, former hospital building with local history displays
WWII Oil Storage Tunnels	Darwin	History	website, tours of the tunnels

== See also ==
- List of museums in Australia
