= Commonwealth Railways NSU class =

Australian narrow-gauge locomotive class

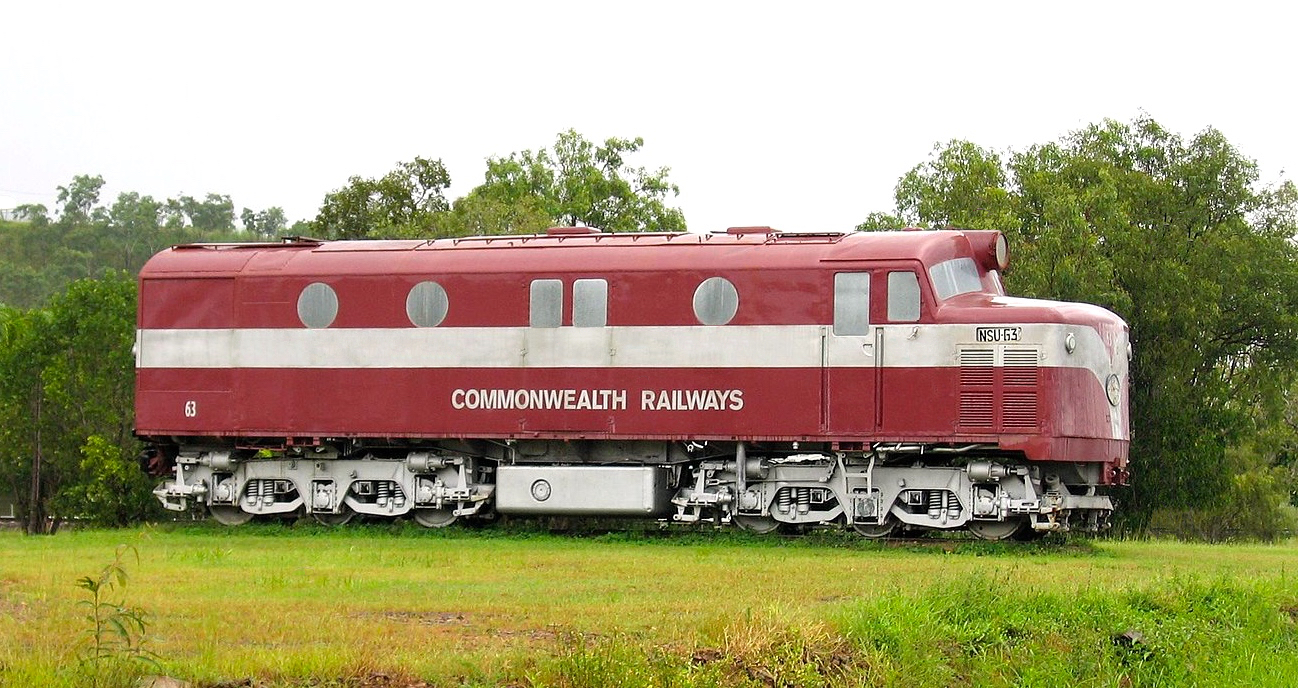
- Static-displayed NSU63 at the Adelaide River Rail Heritage Precinct
Type and origin
- Power type: Diesel-electric
- Builder: Birmingham Railway Carriage and Wagon Company
- Serial number: DEL1 to DEL14
- Build date: 1954–1955
- Total produced: 14
Specifications
- Configuration
  - UIC: A1A–A1A
- Gauge: 1067 mm (3 ft 6 in)
- Length: 12.75 m (41 ft 10 in)
- Loco weight: 60 t (59 long tons; 66 short tons)
- Fuel type: Diesel
- Prime mover: Sulzer 6LDA28
- Generator: Crompton Parkinson CG390
- Traction motors: Crompton Parkinson
Performance figures
- Maximum speed: 80 km/h (50 mph)
- Power output: 630 kW (840 hp)
Career
- Operators: Commonwealth Railways (became Australian National in 1975)
- Number in class: 14
- Numbers: NSU51 to NSU64
- First run: 12 June 1954
- Withdrawn: By August 1987
- Preserved: As of 2022: Operating: 52, 58. Near-operable: 55 (indoors). Indoor display: 51, 61. Held for spare parts: 54. Outdoor display : 53, 56, 57, 59, 60, 62, 63, 64.
- Disposition: See table under "Preservation"

The Commonwealth Railways NSU class is a class of diesel-electric locomotives built in 1954 and 1955 by the Birmingham Railway Carriage and Wagon Company, England, for the Commonwealth Railways to be deployed on the demanding narrow-gauge Central Australia Railway and North Australia Railway. The last withdrawal from revenue service was in 1987. As of 2025, all 14 locomotives were extant – two operating – but 8 had been kept outdoors and were in various states of deterioration.

== The need ==
By the end of World War II, the Commonwealth Railways were operating a diverse, worn-out collection of rolling stock on their 1067 mm (3 ft 6 in) narrow-gauge Central Australia Railway and North Australia Railway, and on their 1435 mm (4 ft 8 1/2 in) standard-gauge Trans-Australian Railway. Steam locomotives hauled both freight and passenger trains, and they had become very unreliable. On the two narrow-gauge lines that comprised the truncated north–south routes along which huge amounts of materiel and troops had been carried during the war, some of the locomotives had 50 or more years of use. Their condition had been worsened in the harsh outback environment through constant jolting – the track was lightweight and much of it had been laid on bare earth 60 years earlier. After post-war economic restrictions had moderated, in 1950 the federal government provided funding for the Commonwealth Railways to replenish its fleet of both narrow and standard gauge locomotives and rolling stock.

== Tenders ==
A call for tenders issued for 14 diesel locomotives for the Commonwealth Railways narrow-gauge lines included some important criteria:

- axle loading of no more than 10.5 tonnes, in order to operate over lightweight rail of 41, 50 and 60 pounds per yard (Note: 20, 25 and 30 kilograms per metre respectively.)
- electric transmission
- three-axle bogies
- tractive effort of at least 21,000 pounds (Note: 93.41 kilonewtons.)
- ability to operate in extreme conditions, with temperatures in excess of 45 °C, poor quality water, and dry, dusty air heavily laden with sand.

Thirteen companies submitted more than 30 designs. However, most tenders did not get past the first stage of the selection procedure because they did not address all the specifications, such as electrical transmission. One important factor was the Chief Mechanical Engineer's preference for the locomotives to have engines in the lower-revolution range, which was expected to lower maintenance costs. The engine in the winning tender, by the Birmingham Railway Carriage and Wagon Company Ltd, was a Sulzer plant with a maximum speed of 750 rpm. By contrast, a design submitted by A.E. Goodwin ran at 1500 rpm.

The decision to award the contract to the Birmingham Railway Carriage and Wagon Company in 1951 was a departure from the Commonwealth Railways' practice of purchasing "well proven" designs, exemplified by its choice of General Motors diesel-electric locomotives for its standard-gauge operations. The British company had a long history of building rail vehicles but this order was its first for locomotives. However, Sulzer had 42 years of experience in locomotive design and Sulzer plants had been used widely in the UK since the early 1930s. (Note: The earliest Sulzer-powered mainline diesels in the UK, the Armstrong-Whitworth 'Universal', had been delivered in 1933.) Any doubt was resolved by the purchase contract stipulating that Sulzer Bros (London) Ltd would accept full responsibility for the design and performance of the completed locomotives.

== The Sulzer engine ==
The LDA series engine, which had its origins in the 1920s, was specifically designed for use in railway applications, although an unfounded belief persisted that it originated in submarine engine designs. (Note: The engines for the NSU class were among the last engines Sulzer built at its Winterthur plant in Switzerland for use outside of Europe; later engines, with only a few exceptions, were built under contract by Vickers-Armstrongs, Barrow-in-Furness, England.)

== In service ==
The NSU class locomotives were instrumental in the Commonwealth Railways assessment, four years after their introduction, that operating costs on the Central Australia Railway had fallen by 60 per cent.

The first locomotives to be unloaded at Port Adelaide were NSU52 on 10 May 1954 and NSU51 ten days later. They were immediately put to use for crew training. Still temporarily mounted on standard-gauge bogies on which it had been trialled in the UK, NSU51 was unveiled at Port Augusta on 12 June 1954 with nameplates showing George McLeay (whose portfolio included the Commonwealth Railways) on the cab sides.

On 26 June 1954, locomotives 51 and 52 worked the first diesel-hauled northbound Ghan into Alice Springs – timed to coincide with a visit of Prime Minister Robert Menzies. The last of the class was commissioned in August 1955.

It was initially expected that the new locomotives would be able to complete a 1370 kilometre round trip from Oodnadatta to Alice Springs on one tank of fuel. This proved to be impracticable and a 91,000-litre fuel tank was installed at Alice Springs. Minor faults with voltage regulators and air and oil filtration systems were quickly rectified, and the design went on to earn a reputation as an efficient and robust unit. But the NSUs were very primitive. Crews reported, for example, that the spring-loaded, 18-notch throttle handle stayed in the selected position when new, but as it wore, it would swing unpredictably and cause the train to lurch violently.

Initially the fleet worked out of Port Augusta on the narrow gauge. (Note: An exception was NSU54 which, still on its inaugural standard-gauge bogies, worked on the standard gauge for some months between Port Augusta and Port Pirie.) Following the construction of the standard-gauge Marree railway line in 1957, which more or less ran parallel to the Central Australia Railway between Port Augusta and Marree, two were transferred to the North Australia Railway operating out of Darwin. During the next 17 years, locomotives were swapped periodically between the two lines.

In July 1975, all the locomotives were included in the transfer of Commonwealth Railways to Australian National.

The NSU fleet remained intact until the Central Australia Railway was superseded by the opening of a new standard-gauge line to Alice Springs in 1980. Two were then transferred to Gladstone for use on the Wilmington line and one to Peterborough for use on the Quorn line. Several others were used by rail retrieval contractors along the Central Australian Railway after it closed. The last was withdrawn in 1987.

== Livery ==
The class spent their entire service with their bodies painted in Commonwealth Railways maroon and silver, and bogies (except for a pair of silver-painted standard-gauge bogies) in black.

== Preservation ==
No members of the class were condemned in revenue service. As of March 2024, two (NSU52 at the Pichi Richi Railway and NSU58 at Old Ghan Heritage Railway and Museum) were operating; NSU55, at Steamtown Heritage Rail Centre, was potentially operable although it had not been used for more than a decade; two were displayed indoors; and the remainder were either stored or displayed outdoors, most of them bogie-mounted body shells from which components had been removed. Further details are below.

Disposition of the NSU class fleet
No.	Main deployment	Status as of March 2024
NSU51 "George McLeay"	With NSU52, worked the first northbound diesel-hauled Ghan train on 26 June 1954.	Displayed indoors at Pichi Richi Railway; not operable
NSU52	With NSU51, worked the first northbound diesel-hauled Ghan train on 26 June 1954. Transferred to Pichi Richi Railway on 24 April 1982. On loan to Australian National July 1986.	Operates on Pichi Richi Railway mainline; very good condition
NSU53	Transferred to North Australia Railway November 1967. Transferred to Marree November 1971. Noted in use as Port Augusta yard shunter, March 1980. Transferred to Peterborough on 15 April 1980. Worked last Peterborough to Quorn and return train on 14 December 1980. Last train to Carrieton on 30 July 1981. Transferred to Alice Springs 17 November 1981. Engines removed from locomotive and sent to "east coast" September 1985.	Bogie-mounted body shell displayed outdoors at the Old Ghan Heritage Railway and Museum, Alice Springs
NSU 54	Worked on standard gauge between Port Pirie and Port Augusta (1954). Based in Quorn for Hawker line duties 1954–1961. Transferred to Pichi Richi Railway late 1983.	Stored for parts at Pichi Richi Railway
NSU55	Used by Goss Brothers for removal of narrow-gauge infrastructure on southern part of Central Australia Railway circa 1982–1983. Transferred from Marree to Peterborough for repairs, January 1984. Recommissioned by Steamtown Peterborough Railway Preservation Society 1998.	Displayed indoors in near-operable condition at Steamtown Heritage Rail Centre, Peterborough
NSU56	Transferred to North Australia Railway November 1972. Transferred to Central Australia Railway 1974. Last working on Central Australia Railway, 29 December 1979. Transferred to Gladstone 30 January 1980. Transferred to Marree October 1981: used by Goss Brothers for removal of Central Australia Railway narrow-gauge infrastructure. Privately owned; has displayed "For sale" sign for more than 30 years.	Bogie-mounted body shell (badly vandalised, no window glass) parked outdoors at west end of Marree railway station yard
NSU57	Employed on removal of Central Australia Railway narrow-gauge infrastructure, 1981–1982; purchased by Marree Progress Association.	Body shell on bogies displayed outdoors (no window glass, fair appearance) at Marree railway station yard
NSU58 "Don Williams"	Transferred from Marree to Gladstone 8 January 1980. Transferred to Peterborough 9 April 1980. Transferred to Ghan Preservation Society 7 July 1988. Named "Don Williams" (then General Manager, Australian National) by Ghan Preservation Society.	Operates in the Old Ghan Heritage Railway and Museum yard
NSU59	To Roberts Construction for removal of infrastructure from northern section of Central Australia Railway, June 1981–September 1982. Acquired by Old Ghan Heritage Railway and Museum.	Stored at the Old Ghan Heritage Railway and Museum
NSU60	Worked last CR diesel-hauled freight to Hawker 20 January 1961. Employed on removal of Central Australia Railway narrow-gauge infrastructure, 1981–1982; purchased by Marree Progress Association.	Bogie-mounted body shell displayed outdoors (window spaces covered by sheet metal, lower half of body covered in outback artwork) at Marree railway station yard
NSU61	Transferred to Mile End Railway Museum (predecessor of the National Railway Museum, Port Adelaide), January 1984.	Displayed indoors, inoperable, at the National Railway Museum, Port Adelaide; excellent restored finish
NSU62	Transferred to North Australia Railway, November 1972. Transferred to Central Australia Railway 1974. Used by Goss Brothers for removal of Central Australia Railway narrow gauge infrastructure, 1982–1983. Transferred from Marree to Steamtown Peterborough Railway Preservation Society for spare parts, January 1994. In 2009 the locomotive was proposed to be cut up to create an interactive "cab display". In 2023, the locomotive was transferred to the Farina Restoration Group on loan from the Steamtown Heritage Rail Centre (successor to the Steamtown Peterborough Railway Preservation Society) for display alongside other railway rolling stock collocated with almost 20 buildings the group is restoring at Farina.	Bogie-mounted body shell displayed outdoors (deteriorated body; window spaces filled by reflective sheeting) at Farina, South Australia.
NSU63	Transferred to North Australia Railway November 1956. Transferred to Port Augusta November 1967. To Roberts Construction for removal of narrow gauge infrastructure from northern part of Central Australia Railway June 1981. Engines removed from locomotive and sent to "east coast" September 1985.	Displayed outdoors (bogie-mounted, sealed body shell) at Adelaide River
NSU64	Transferred to North Australia Railway, September 1956. Transferred to Marree November 1971. To Roberts Construction for removal of narrow gauge infrastructure from northern part of Central Australia Railway June 1981.	Displayed outdoors at Old Ghan Heritage Railway and Museum

== Gallery ==
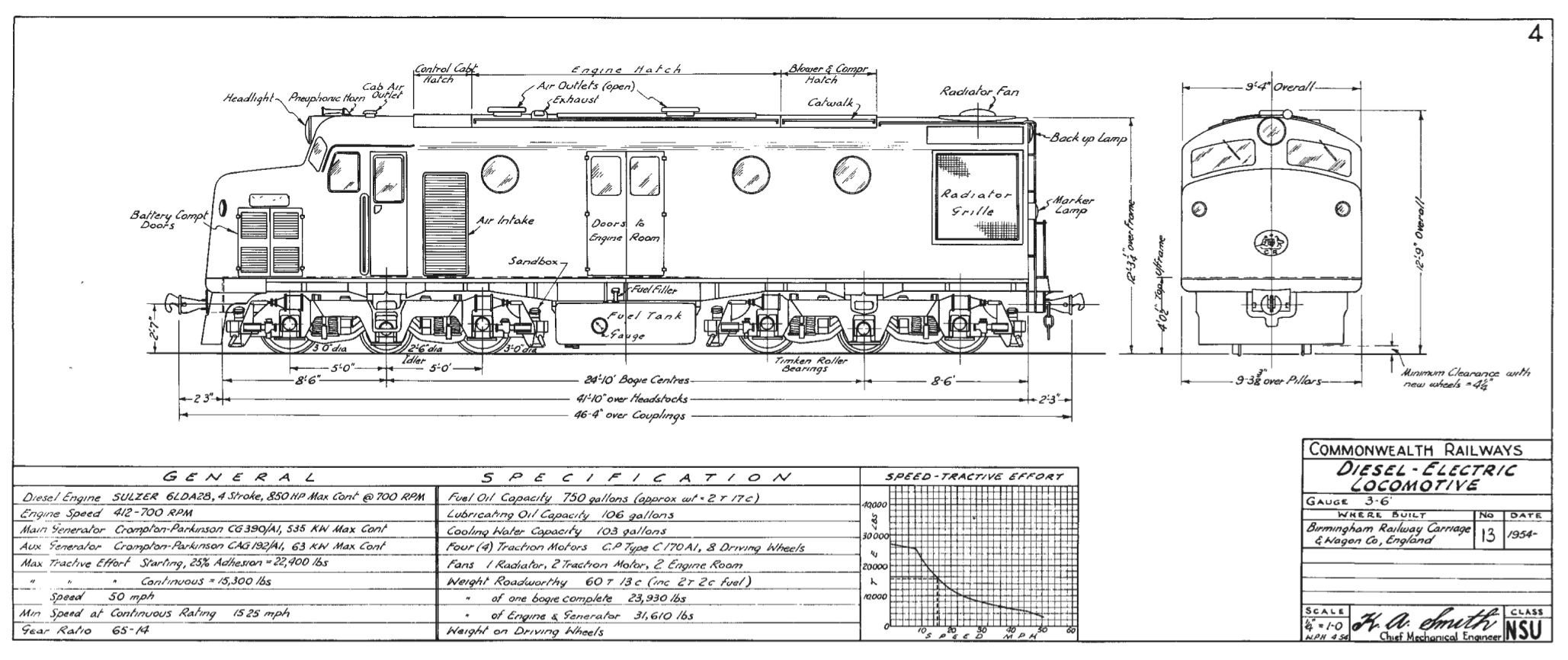
Commonwealth Railways general arrangement drawing of the NSU class, including specifications and speed/tractive effort graph

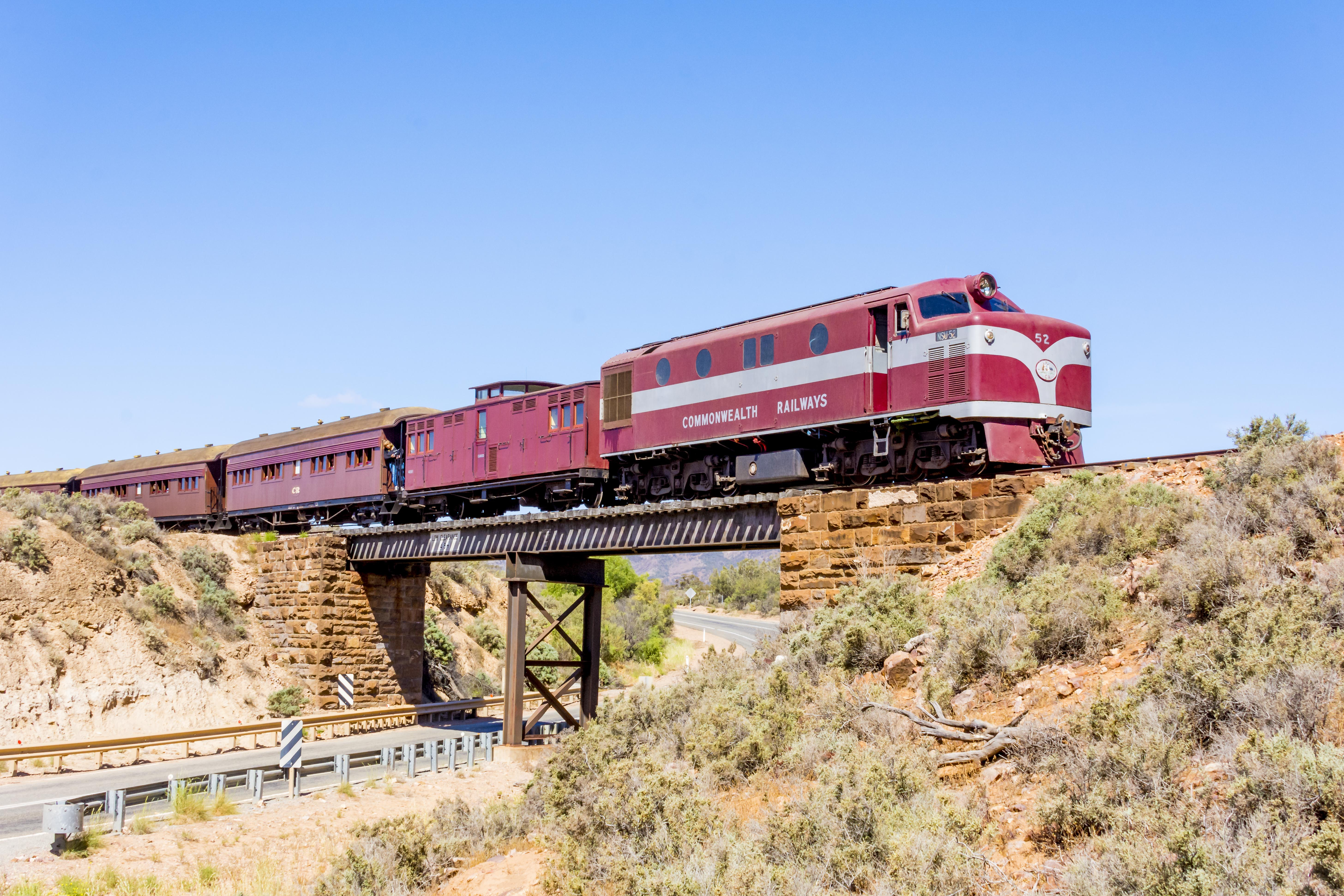
Pichi Richi Railway's restored NSU52, crossing Saltia bridge near Quorn in October 2019, is only one of two NSU class locos in operation.

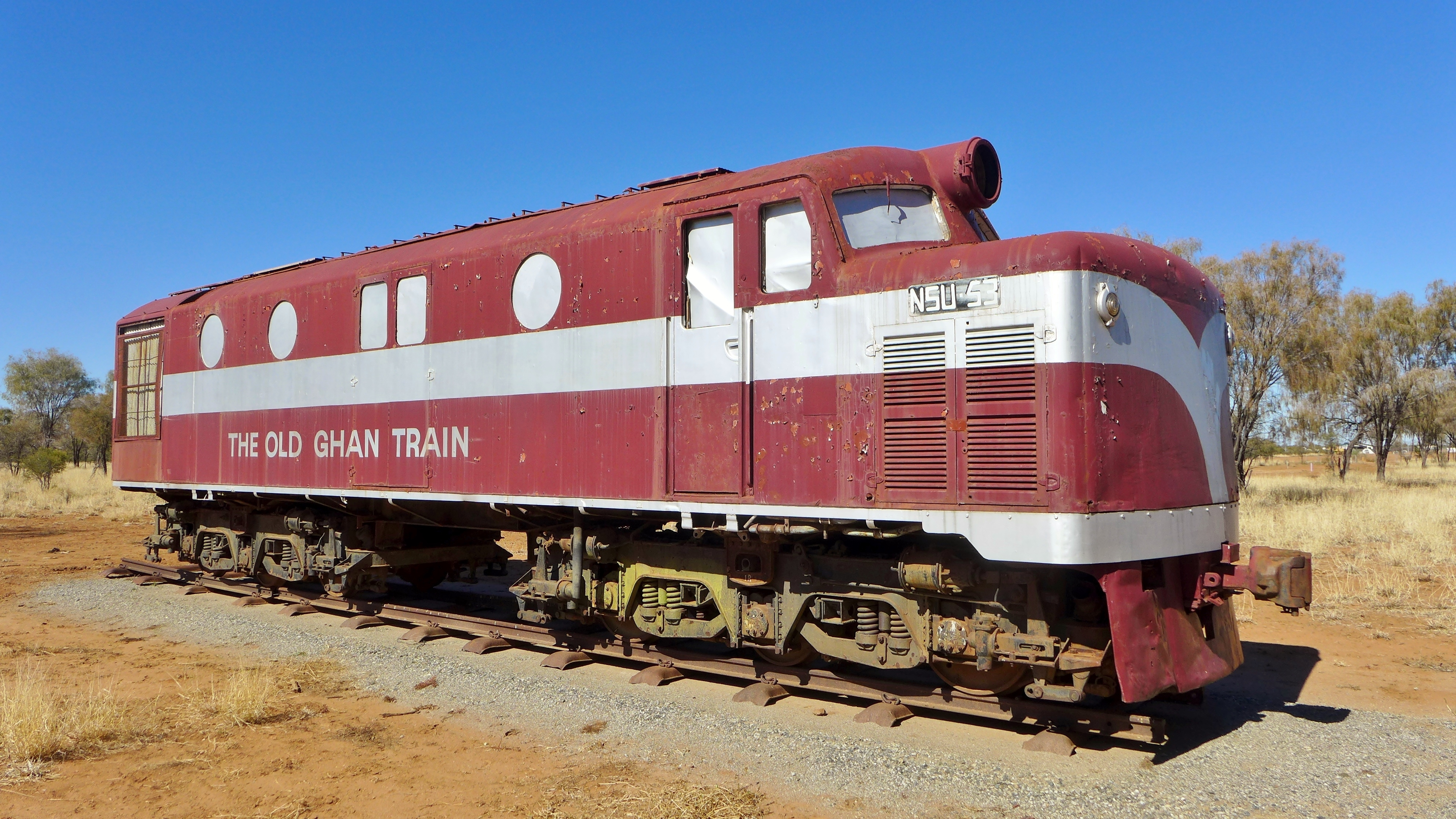
NSU53: sealed body shell on bogies near the entrance to the Old Ghan Heritage Railway and Museum, Alice Springs, 2015

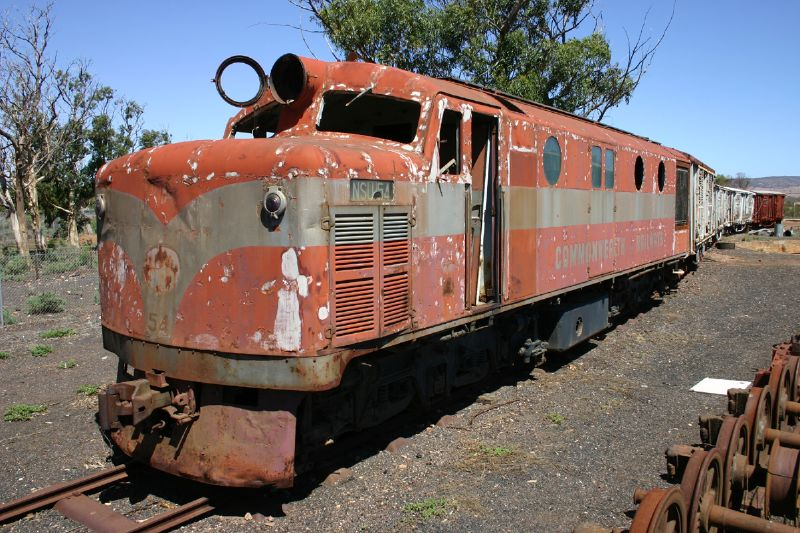
NSU54 at the Pichi Richi Railway, Quorn, South Australia in 2007 – a source of spare parts for NSU52, which regularly heads tour trains

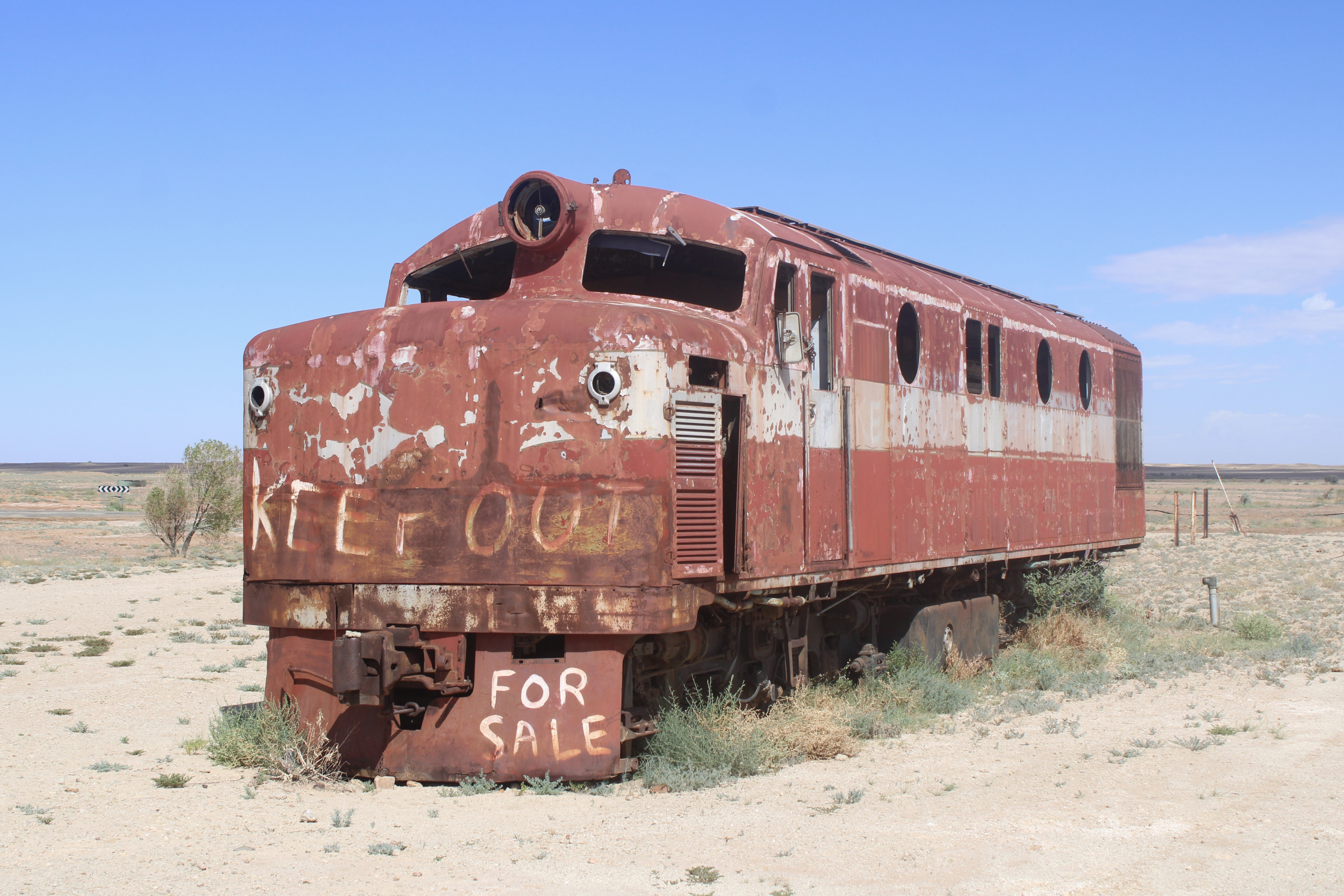
NSU56: derelict body shell and bogies at Marree, 2021

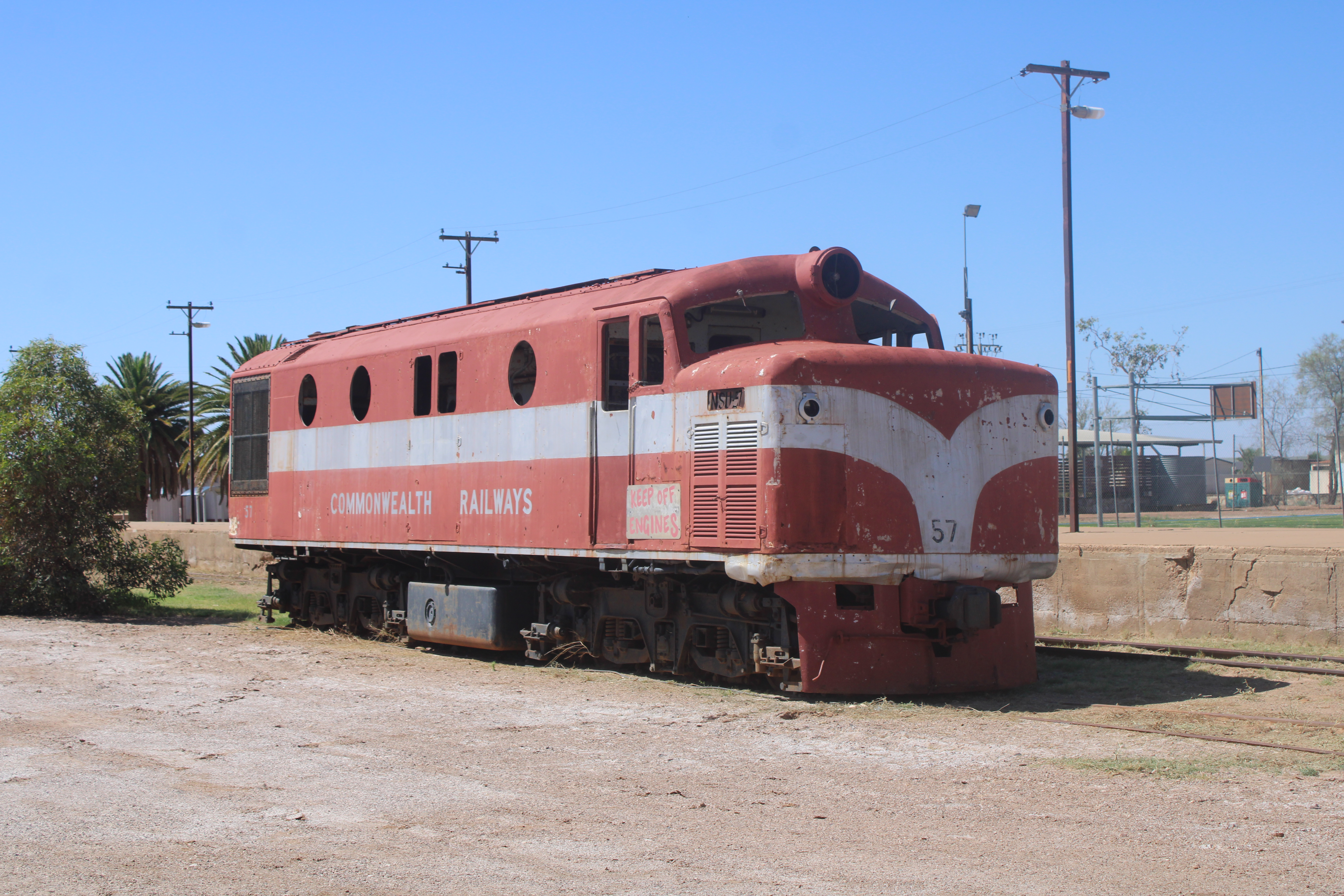
NSU57: body shell on bogies at Marree railway station, January 2021

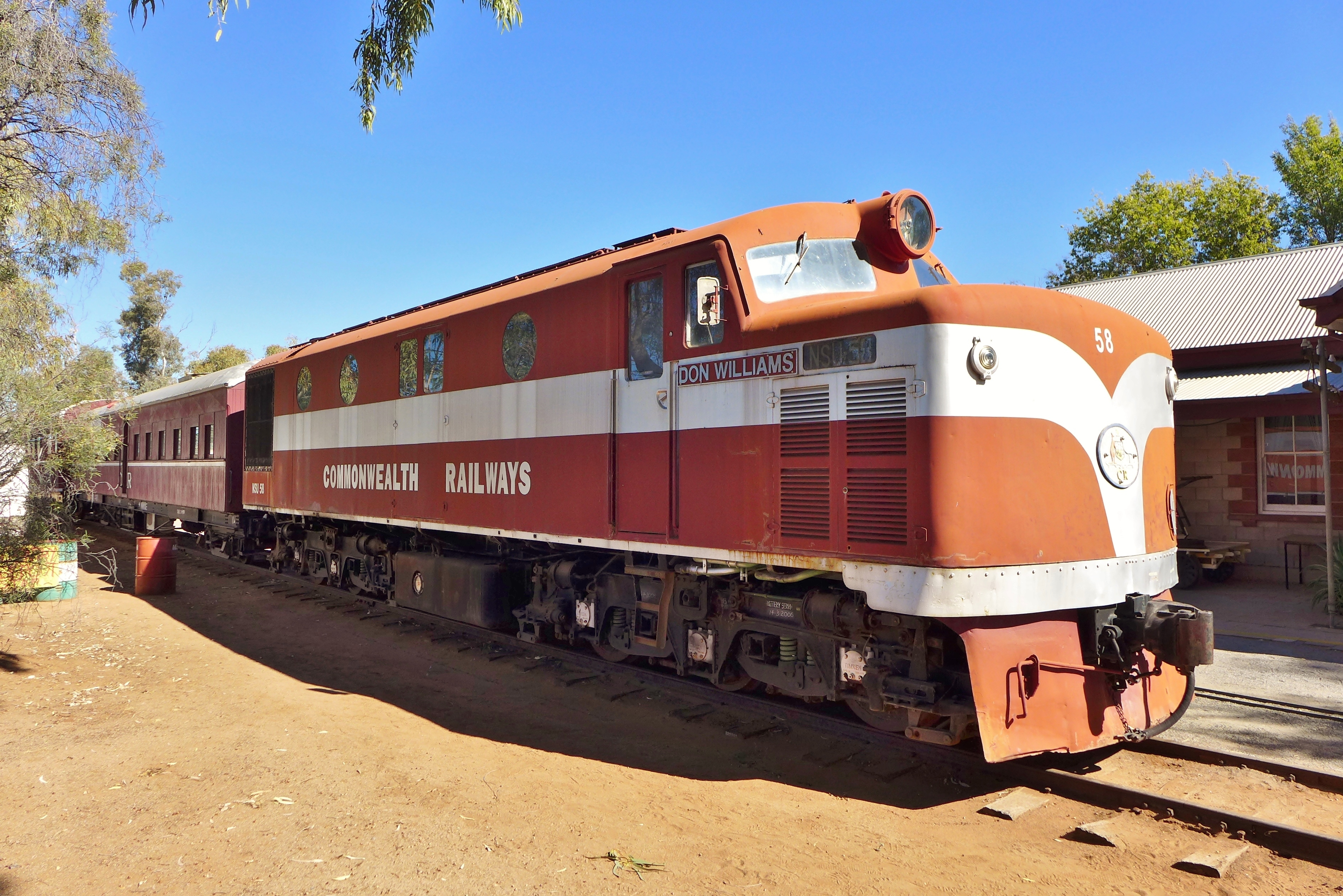
Preserved NSU58 at the Old Ghan Heritage Railway and Museum, Alice Springs, in 2015, with a rake of carriages from the legendary narrow-gauge train, The Ghan. As of 2020, it was one of two NSU class locomotives in near-operable condition.

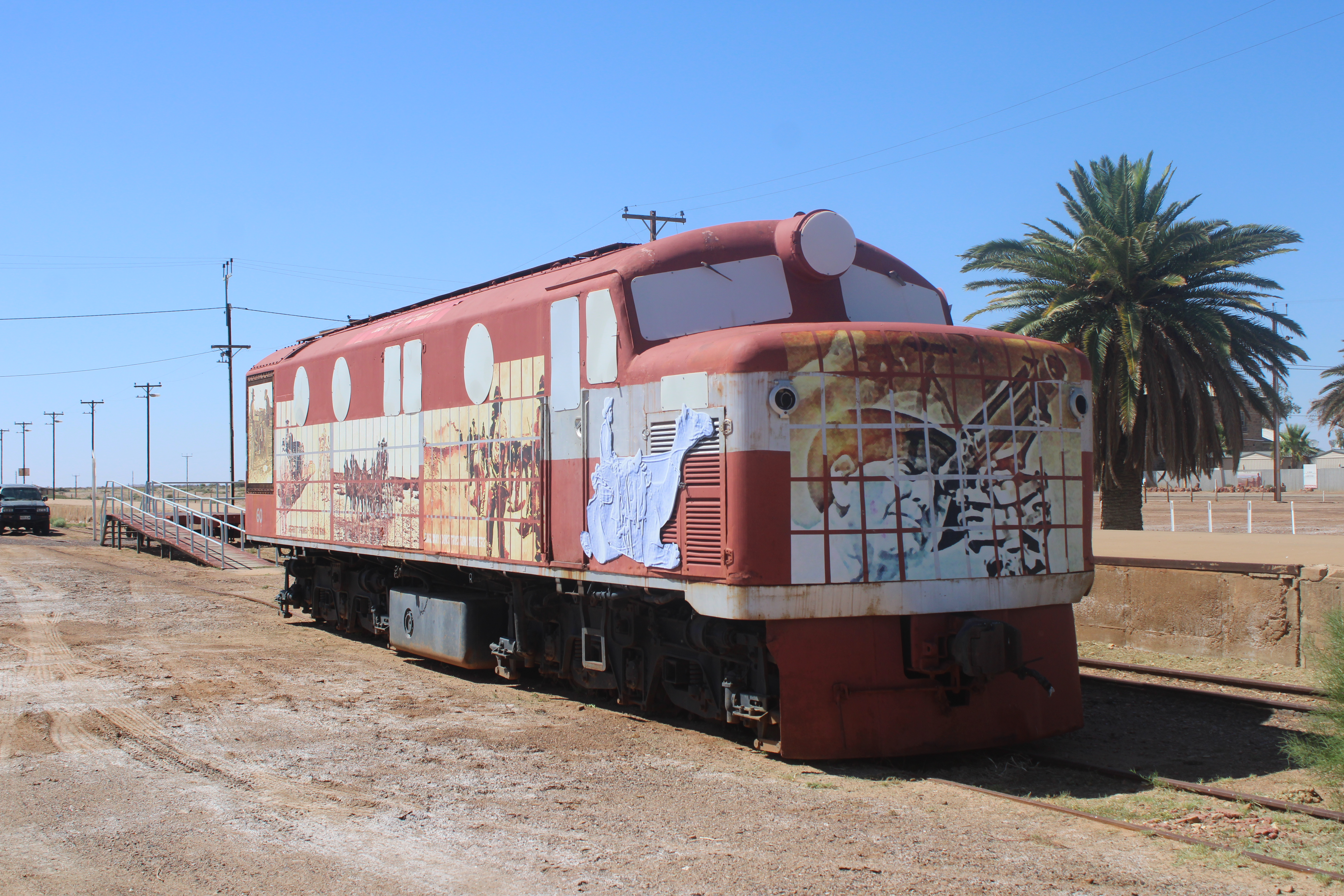
NSU60: sealed body shell on bogies at Marree, 2021. As decoration, the Marree Progress Association commissioned artwork with an Outback theme.

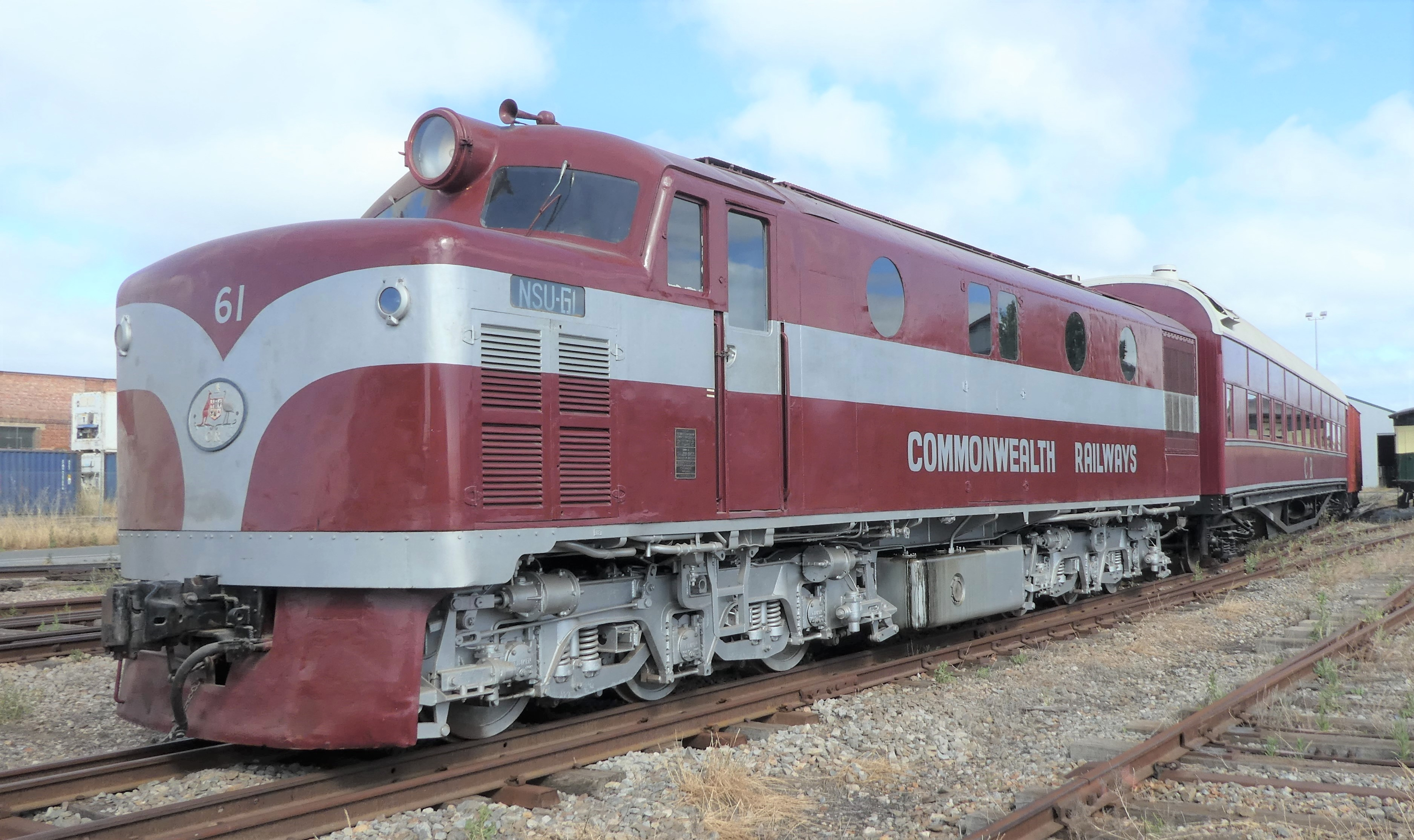
NSU61: normally displayed indoors at the National Railway Museum, Port Adelaide, it was in a similar condition to the locomotives at Marree when acquired in 1986 (here in 2015)
