= South Australian Railways W class =

Class of Australian 2-6-0 locomotives

South Australian Railways W and Wx class
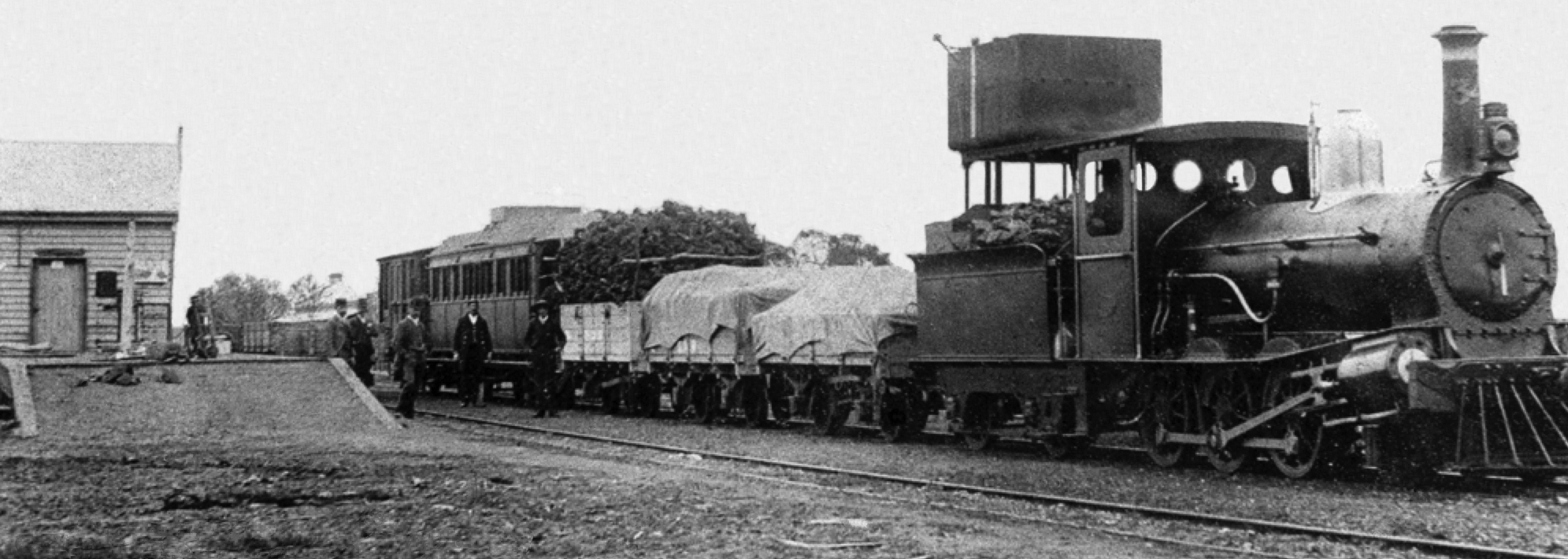
- A W class locomotive at the head of a short narrow‑gauge mixed train, about 1880
Type and origin
- Power type: Steam
- Builder: Beyer, Peacock & Co
- Build date: 1877-1882
- Total produced: 35
Specifications
- Configuration
  - Whyte: 2-6-0
- Gauge: 1,067 mm (3 ft 6 in)
- Driver dia.: 3 ft 3 in (991 mm)
- Height: 11 ft 4 in (3,454.4 mm)
- Adhesive weight: 33,040 lb (14,987 kg)
- Loco weight: 42,000 lb (19,051 kg)
- Fuel type: Coal
- Firebox
  - Grate area: 45 sq ft (4.2 m^{2})
- Boiler pressure: W: 130 psi (896 kPa); Wx: 145 psi (1,000 kPa)
- Heating surface: 544 sq ft (50.5 m^{2})
- Cylinders: 2
- Cylinder size: 12 in × 20 in (305 mm × 508 mm)
Performance figures
- Tractive effort: 8,159 lbf (36.29 kN)
- Factor of adh.: 4.05
Career
- Operators: South Australian Railways 1877–1929; Commonwealth Railways 1911–1950
- Class: W/Wx
- Preserved: W 53 (as North Australia Railway NF5) and Wx 18
- Disposition: 1 destroyed in air raid, 32 scrapped, 2 preserved

The South Australian Railways W and Wx class is a class of 2-6-0 steam locomotives operated by the South Australian Railways. Some were used by the Commonwealth Railways in the Northern Territory and by contractors.

== History ==
The W class was the second class of locomotive built to the 2-6-0 (Mogul) wheel arrangement to be supplied to the South Australian Railways (SAR) – the first being the U class, of which there were only eight. The class eventually totalled 35 in number and saw service on every SAR narrow gauge line. The locomotives were first introduced in 1878 during a period of rapid expansion of the railway system.

The class designed by SAR locomotive engineer, William Thow were ordered as light goods locomotives for use on the expanding South Australian Railways 3 ft 6 in (1,067 mm) gauge lines, necessarily limited in size and weight by the lightweight 40 lb/yd rails used at the time. The locomotives were built by Beyer, Peacock & Co. of Manchester.

Early W class units were used during construction of the Central Australia Railway between Port Augusta and Quorn in 1878 before entering revenue service with SAR. During their operational career, the locomotives were used within South Australia on the isolated Eyre Peninsula Railway, in the south east on now closed lines in the Kingston, Naracoorte and Mount Gambier areas as well as the line north from Port Augusta. Many were sold or leased to contractors and they were also used by the Railways Construction Branch. Several of the locomotives were sold to C&E Millar and used for construction of the Palmerston and Pine Creek Railway in the Northern Territory and would continue to work the isolated line for the remainder of their operational lives.

== Wx and NF classes ==
From 1903, the SAR began to rebuild W class locomotives with upgraded boilers increased to 145 psi (1,000 kPa) pressure, which improved the tractive effort to 8,566 lbf (38.10 kN). 18 of the class were rebuilt and designated Wx class.

In 1911, administrative responsibility for the Northern Territory, including the Palmerston and Pine Creek Railway, was passed from South Australia to the Commonwealth. Five unmodified W class locomotives were transferred to Commonwealth Railways at the Parap railway workshops and designated NF class. The condition of these locomotives was such that W35 and W41 were stripped down and the parts from both used to make NF7 an operational locomotive. Commonwealth Railways purchased an additional two locomotives of the class in 1915 from private interests involved with building the Eyre Peninsula Railway.

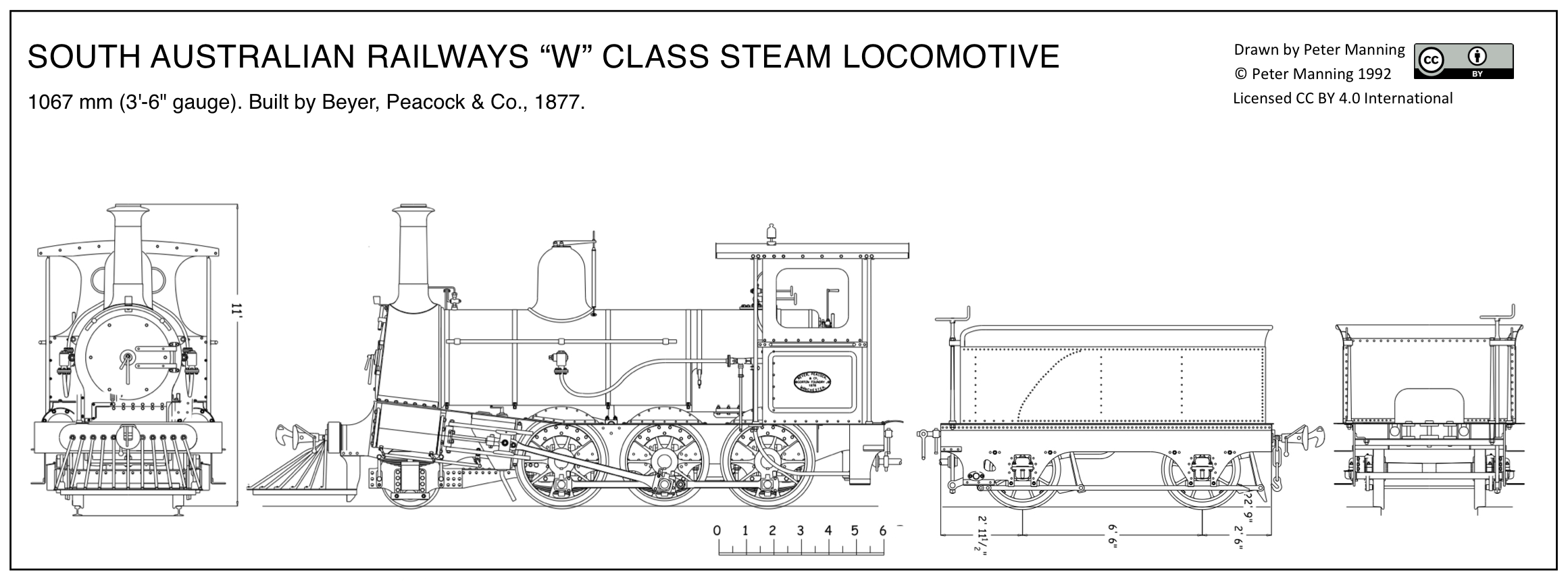
The W class as delivered, before the boiler upgrade that saw some of them classified as Wx

== Withdrawal from service ==
By 1929, unmodified W class units had been withdrawn from service by South Australian Railways and the majority sold for scrap. TW22 had been sold to Western Australian Government Railways in 1893 and was not withdrawn until 1958. W38, in private hands with Baxter and Saddler from 1896, was condemned in 1955. Several Wx class units were also withdrawn in 1929, but a small number endured until 1959 when the SAR's South-eastern Division narrow-gauge lines were converted to 1600 mm (5 ft 3 in).

The six units converted by Commonwealth Railways to NF class were withdrawn between 1928 and 1945; three worked on the North Australia Railway operating the line during World War II. NF6 was destroyed during the first Japanese air raid on Darwin in 1942 while shunting munitions on the Stokes Hill jetty. The locomotive was blown into the harbour and although both driver and fireman survived, the fate of NF6 remains unknown as it has never been located.

== Preservation ==
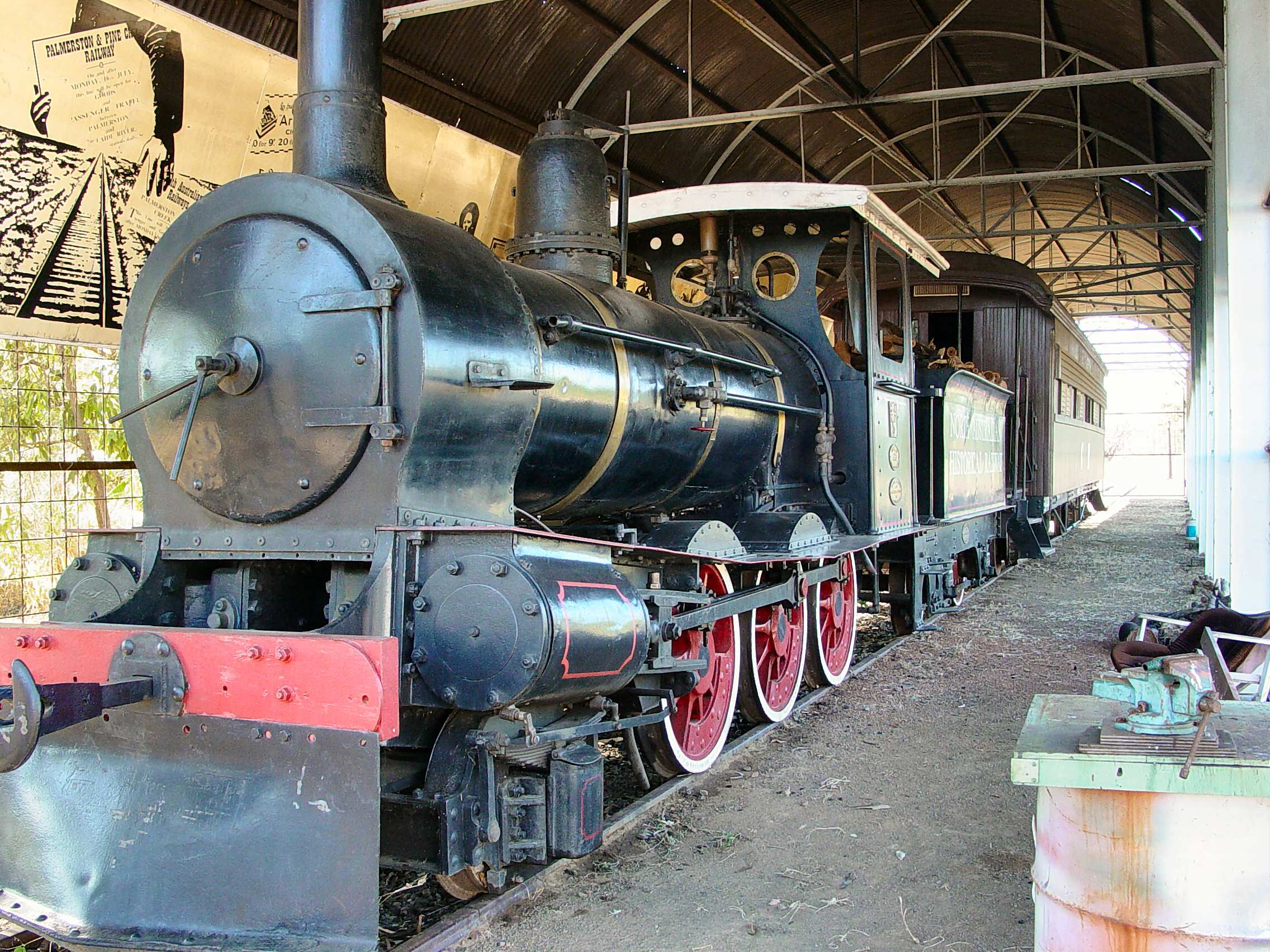
South Australian Railways W53, later Commonwealth Railways NF5, which operated on the North Australia Railway, at the National Trust's Pine Creek railway station museum

Two have been preserved:

- NF5 (W53) has been restored to operational condition at Pine Creek, Northern Territory. One of the earliest examples of the class, W53 was built in 1877 and was used on the construction of the Port Augusta–Quorn section of what became the Central Australia Railway; it was one of two W class purchased by Commonwealth Railways in 1915 and redesignated NF5 for use on the North Australia Railway. NF5 was withdrawn from service following the end of World War II and was preserved and displayed in several locations around Darwin, before its eventual relocation to Pine Creek, where it was restored to operating condition as a Centenary of Federation project by the Pine Creek Community Government Council.
- Wx18 is stored at the Pichi Richi Railway, Quorn. It entered service in July 1879, was upgraded to Wx class in 1911, and in 1959 hauled the last narrow gauge goods train on the Kingston–Naracoorte line, where it had spent its operational life. It was displayed in Naracoorte until moved to Pichi Richi in July 1985. Restoration was halted in 2000 and It is currently dismantled awaiting its restoration when time and funds permit.
