= Pine Creek railway station =

Former railway station in Northern Territory, Australia

Pine Creek
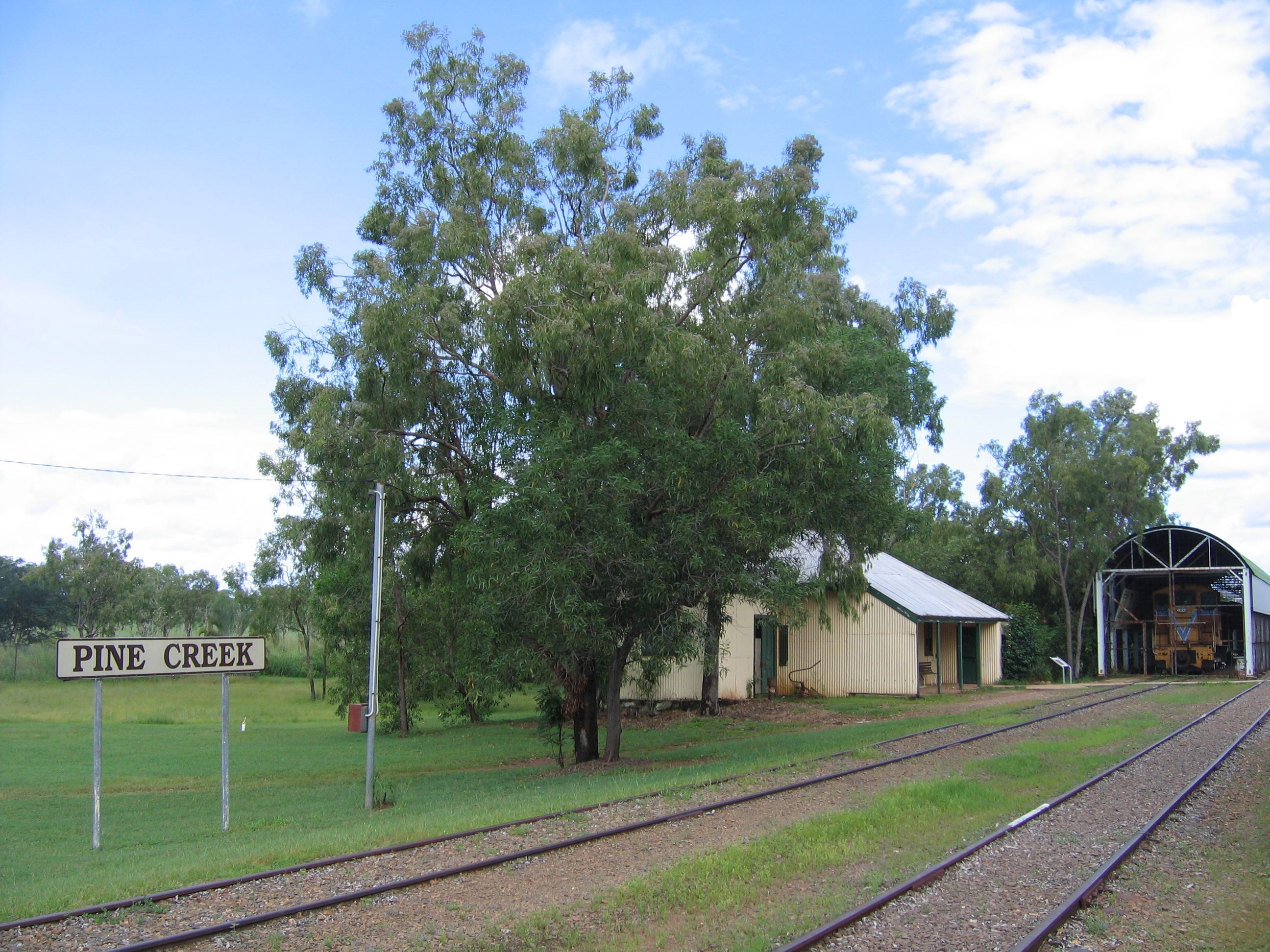

General information
- Coordinates: 13°49′11″S 131°49′58.40″E
- Line: North Australia Railway
- Distance: 235 km (146 mi)
- Platforms: 1
- Tracks: 4

History
- Opened: 1889
- Closed: 1976
Location

Pine Creek railway station is a disused railway station and museum on the former North Australia Railway in Pine Creek in the Northern Territory of Australia. The station is located 235 km (146 mi) from the original Darwin station, and was the southern terminus of the line until 1914. The station precinct is the most complete remaining example of infrastructure associated with the line.

== History ==
=== Palmerston and Pine Creek Railway ===
The construction of the railway line from Palmerston (now Darwin) reached Pine Creek in 1889, providing easier access to the goldfields from Port Darwin in the north, however by the time of completion the local mining industry was entering a decline. The station yard was designed with two sidings, each capable of handling forty-two goods wagons to allow for traffic growth at the terminus. Mixed passenger and goods trains began revenue services on 1 October 1889, operated by the Palmerston division of South Australian Railways and hauled by "W" class Beyer Peacock locomotives. Three trains per week served Pine Creek, arriving in the evenings on Monday, Wednesday and Friday and departing on the return journey to Palmerston at 8 am the following morning. The journey time was approximately nine and a half hours, including a refreshment stop at Adelaide River.

The passenger fare between Palmerston and Pine Creek was initially charged at a rate of 4d per mile for first class and 3d per mile for second class, relatively expensive given the passenger accommodation on the trains were criticised as being more suited to livestock than paying passengers. Similarly, tariffs for transport of heavy goods and machinery by rail to Pine Creek were seen by many as being set too high to promote growth of the mining industry even before the line opened, despite this being a major reason for its construction.

=== Commonwealth takeover and extension of line ===
In 1914, following the Commonwealth taking over administration of the Northern Territory and railway, the line was extended to Emungalan, on the northern bank of the Katherine River to serve the pastoral industry and transport cattle to Vestey's Meatworks in Darwin. Pine Creek remained a major station following the extension, and new sidings were added at the station. Commonwealth Railways assumed the responsibility for the operation of the station in 1918. The journey time from Pine Creek to Emungalan was approximately three hours By the 1920s the train service south was running only once per fortnight, with northbound trains operating weekly.

Despite the service reductions and closure of Vestey's Meatworks, the Commonwealth government approved a further extension south to Daly Waters. Simultaneously, a narrow gauge line was extended from Oodnadatta, South Australia to Alice Springs with the eventual aim of joining the north and south lines to form a transcontinental railway. Construction on the northern line was halted at Birdum, 70 km (43 mi) short of Daly Waters due to the Great Depression in 1929. In 1926, the line was renamed the North Australia Railway and Pine Creek while no longer a terminus, remained an overnight stopping place.

=== World War II ===
With Australia's involvement in World War II, a number of military bases were established in the Northern Territory. The railway proved to be an important transport link. In 1939, Pine Creek station was called on by just a single weekly train in each direction. By 1941, several per week stopped here and this number would continue to grow to 147 weekly services by 1944.

The station was a major dispersal base during the war.

== Museum ==
The station precinct now operates as a museum. It is home to a restored and operational 1877 Commonwealth Railways NF class steam locomotive, used in construction of the railway, and a former Western Australian Government Railways TA class diesel-electric shunting locomotive, also maintained in operational condition. Much of the original terminus remains, with preserved buildings including the original passenger station with restrooms, parcel office and waiting room along with the goods shed, loading bank, weighbridge and crane. A number of other original railway buildings were removed following the closure of the line in 1976, but the site was added to the Register of the National Estate in October 1980 and subsequently the remaining infrastructure was progressively restored and preserved.

The station precinct was listed on the Northern Territory Heritage Register in 1994.
