= South Australian Railways U class =

Class of Australian 2-6-0 locomotives

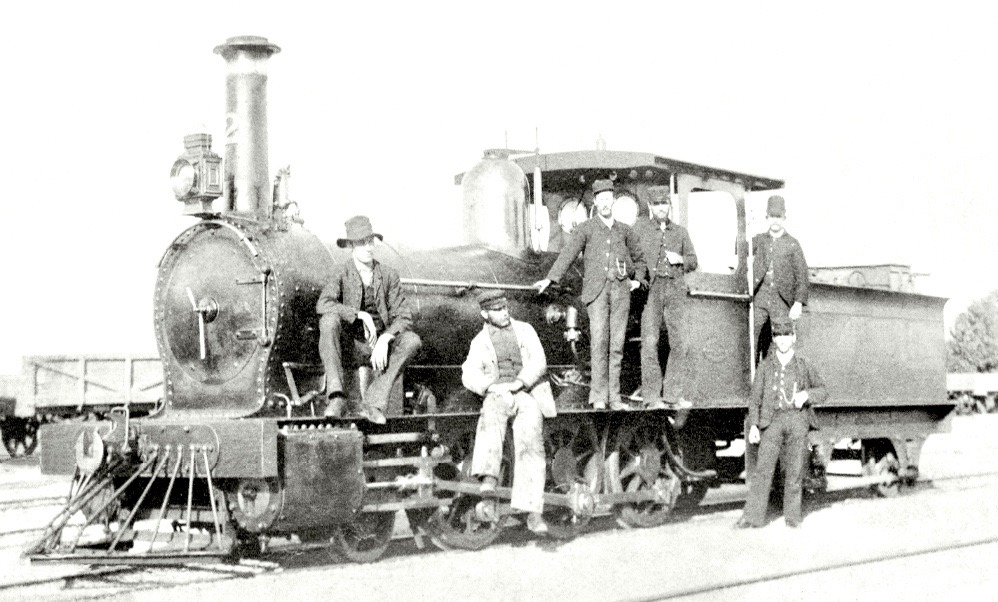
- U class locomotive no. 2 in 1891
Type and origin
- Power type: Steam
- Builder: Beyer, Peacock and Company
- Serial number: 1499-1506
- Build date: 1876
- Total produced: 8
- Number rebuilt: 4
Specifications
- Configuration
  - Whyte: 2-6-0
  - UIC: 2'C 2
- Gauge: 3 ft 6 in (1,067 mm)
- Length: 34 ft 6 1/2 in (10.528 m)
- Axle load: 5 long tons 3 cwt (11,500 lb or 5.2 t)
- Total weight: 30 long tons 3 cwt (67,500 lb or 30.6 t)
- Fuel type: Coal
- Fuel capacity: 2 long tons 6 cwt (5,200 lb or 2.3 t)
- Water cap.: 850 imp gal (1,020 US gal; 3,900 L)
- Firebox
  - Grate area: 9.76 sq ft (0.907 m^{2})
- Boiler pressure: 130 lb/sq in (896 kPa)
- Heating surface
  - Firebox: 45.4 sq ft (4.22 m^{2})
  - Tubes: 492.1 sq ft (45.72 m^{2})
- Cylinders: 2
- Cylinder size: 12 in × 20 in (305 mm × 508 mm)
Performance figures
- Tractive effort: 7,532 lbf (33.50 kN)
Career
- Operators: South Australian Railways
- Class: U
- Number in class: 8
- Numbers: 1-8
- First run: April 1876
- Withdrawn: 1904-1929
- Scrapped: 1904-1955
- Disposition: All scrapped

The eight members of the South Australian Railways U class were the first narrow-gauge 1067 mm (3 ft 6 in) locomotives on the South Australian Railways and the first of many steam locomotives built by Beyer, Peacock and Company for the railway. They entered service in 1876: four on the Port Wakefield to Hoyleton line and four on the Port Pirie to Crystal Brook line. Subsequently they operated on the Port Wakefield, Port Pirie and Port Augusta lines.

In addition to their SAR operations, several were used by contractors at various times on extending the narrow gauge lines into the hinterland. Their role on main lines did not last long, because of shortcomings in the valve gear and pony truck designs; locomotives of the long-lived W class entered service two years later, after which the U class locomotives were deployed on shunting and further railway construction. In 1915, with the Thevenard gypsum line open and resources no doubt stretched, three were sent to the isolated Port Lincoln Division for three years until the first of the Y class arrived. Their working lives variously lasted 28 years (three locos), 48–53 (four) and 79 (one).

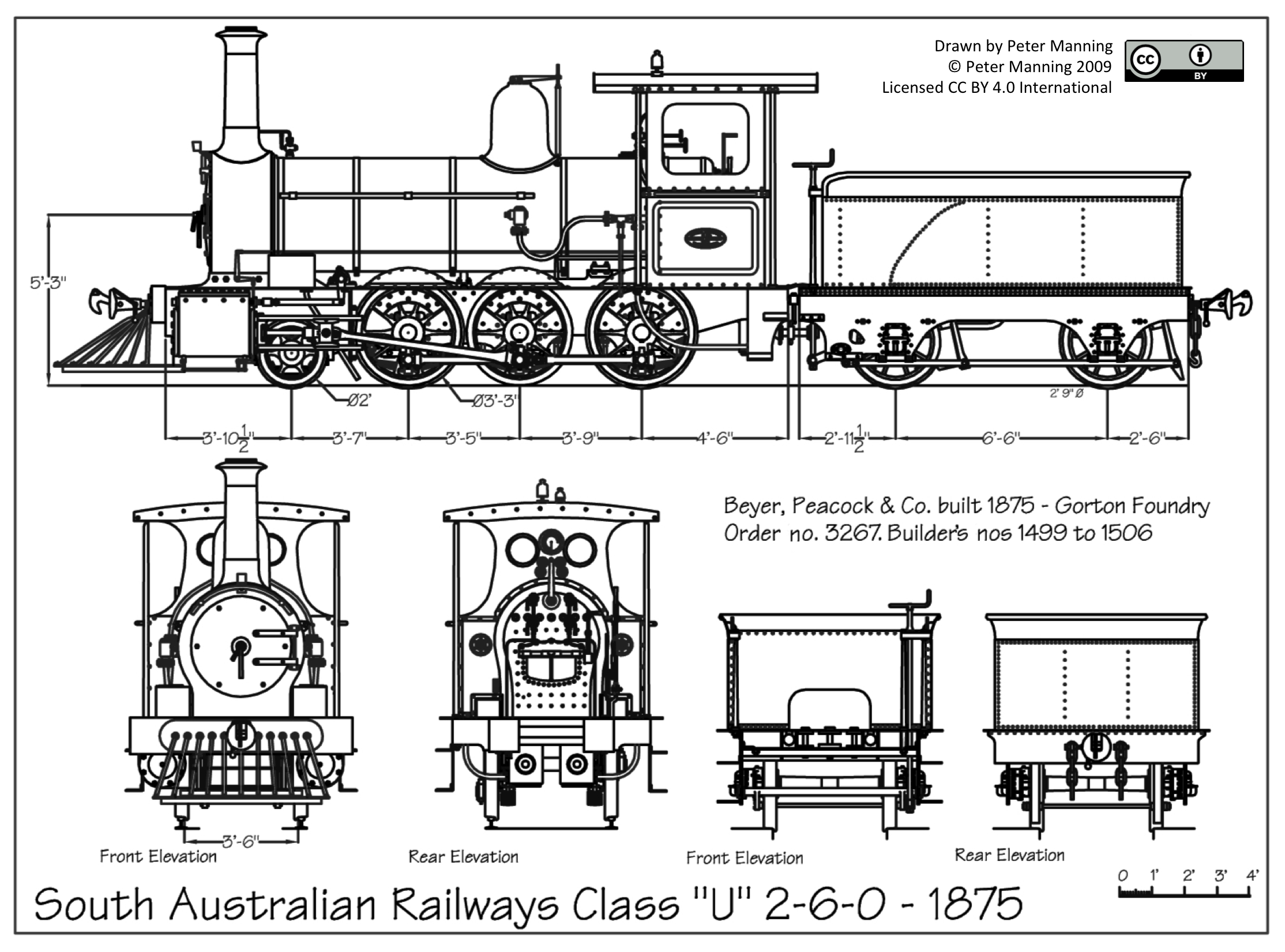
