= National Road Transport Museum =

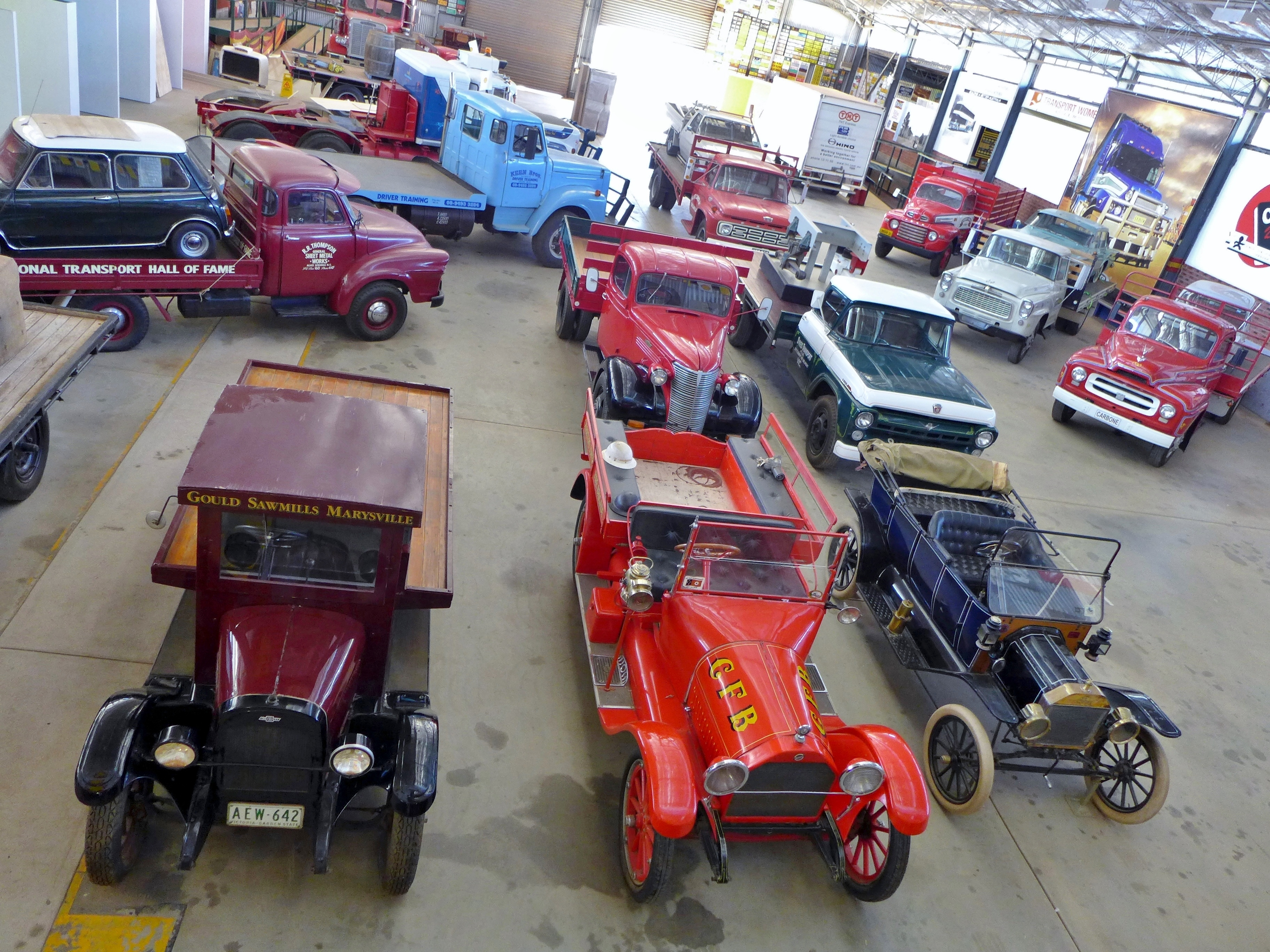
- Part of the older vehicles display
- Established: 31 July 1995; 31 years ago
- Location: Norris Bell Avenue, Alice Springs, Northern Territory, Australia
- Coordinates: 23°46′38″S 133°52′03″E
- Type: Road and rail transport museum
- Owner: Road Transport Historical Society Inc.
- Website: Official website

The National Road Transport Museum (previously known as the National Road Transport Hall of Fame) is an Australian transport museum in Alice Springs, Northern Territory, owned by the Road Transport Historical Society.

The Old Ghan Heritage Railway and Museum, which the society also operates, is on the adjoining site.

== Operations ==
As a community-based volunteer organisation, the Museum is dedicated to preserving Australia's road transport heritage. Many forms of road transport—from camel trains of old to road trains and coaches of today—are displayed.

The Museum has taken what it calls a lateral approach to the restoration of vehicles: instead of showing them in off-the-production-line condition, they stand as they were in their working lives, including the pragmatic, often crude, modifications that bush mechanics had to undertake in Australia's harsh outback working environment, which is "testimony to the trials and tribulations of Australia's road transport industry pioneers".

== History ==
The origins of the Museum go back at least as far as 1990, when the idea for it first occurred to Liz Martin, who for many years drove Mack prime movers between Adelaide and Darwin. She and others were concerned that "... most trucks from yesteryear were rusting away on rural properties and cattle stations."

Following a public meeting in 1992, the Road Transport Historical Society was formed later the same year. Volunteers began collecting vehicles, memorabilia, photographs and stories. On 31 July 1995, the Society officially opened the Museum, then named the National Road Transport Hall of Fame.

The then Hall of Fame soon became the host of a national 'truckies reunion', first held in 1992. Initially, the reunions were held annually, with a big one every five years.

Martin served as the president of the Society for its first 13 years and as the Hall of Fame's CEO from 2000. Under her leadership, the Hall of Fame came to be, according to Charles Darwin University, Darwin, "... highly regarded by all in the road transport industry and ... able to attract increasing numbers of visitors from around the nation and the world."

As of 2010, the Hall of Fame was already the largest trucking museum in the Southern Hemisphere, and was still growing with assistance from donations of trucks and trailers. Thousands of people attended that year's week-long truckies reunion, with hundreds of restored vehicles participating in a closing parade through Alice Springs. In 2015, up to 10,000 people were estimated to have turned up to the truckies reunion, which culminated in an hours-long procession of restored trucks along the Stuart Highway.

By the mid-2010s, however, the Society was experiencing management difficulties that led to conflict with government regulators. Its financial records for 2013 were lost and not recovered until 2017; in the meantime, its records for subsequent years could not be audited. Additionally, the Society did not hold its Annual General Meetings within the required timeframe. Most of the Society's members were truck drivers and farmers from interstate who did not want to hold the AGMs during the truckies reunions, and various other factors led to the AGMs being held in February or March. A related problem was that most of the Society's committee members were based interstate. By 2017, Northern Territory government officials were threatening repeatedly to appoint a statutory manager to the Society.

In February 2018, the government announced that it had commenced an investigation into the affairs of the Hall of Fame, including in relation to compliance with the Associations Act. The announcement prompted Martin to tender her resignation as CEO.

These developments led to discussions later in February 2018 between the Society and the government, which generated a proposal to convert the Society into a nationally regulated corporation. However, as of the annual reunion in August that year, not much had become of the proposal, and the government still considered non compliance with regulatory requirements to be a big issue. Attendances at the annual reunion were substantially lower, and some of the owners of trucks on loan to the Hall of Fame had taken them back.

In December 2018, the Alice Springs News reported that Martin and another representative of the Society had travelled to Darwin the previous month for a meeting with a government minister that had been cancelled at the last minute.

The government inquiry eventually concluded that as of 2016, the Society had failed to lodge financial statements since 2010, that financial statements had not been available for AGMs held in 2016 and 2017 even though the treasurer or CEO had purported to report on the Society's financial status, and that it appeared that those AGMs had been held without a quorum. In July 2019, the government appointed a statutory manager, Rosey Batt, to the Society, even though it acknowledged that the Society was "in a sound financial position and able to meet its obligations". The management committee was dissolved and Martin resigned, but volunteers managed to keep the Hall of Fame open.

In September 2024, the Society reverted to the control of an independent board, chaired by Frank Bilato, an experienced trucking industry figure. The CEO, Nick Prus, told Big Rigs that the government had given the Society an A$3.5 million development grant to construct more buildings and fix existing ones, some 70% of which were "non-compliant", and also to develop its 10-year strategic plan. Additionally, the Society had received an A$100,000 operational grant, together with A$216,000 to rebuild the ablution blocks in the volunteers' camping ground.

At about the same time, the Hall of Fame came to be known as the National Road Transport Museum, and the truckies reunion as the Festival of Transport.

== Exhibitions ==
=== Buntine Pavilion ===
The Museum's main exhibition hall, and the first building to be constructed on the site, is the Buntine Pavilion, named after Noel Buntine, a respected pioneer of the Northern Territory's road transport industry. It houses a collection of classic cars and trucks.

=== Kenworth Dealer Hall of Fame ===
The exhibitions at the Museum also include the Kenworth Dealer Hall of Fame, which was opened in 2005. Alice Springs was chosen as the Hall of Fame's home partly because Kenworth's focus in Australia is the road train industry (which was born in the Northern Territory), and partly because the town has a dry climate well suited to the hosting and display of old machinery.

Upon opening, the Hall of Fame had 2,000 m^{2} (22,000 sq ft) of display space, and four trucks: a 1965 Kenworth W923, a 1971 K125 (the first Kenworth to be built in Australia, better known as the Grey Ghost), and two new Kenworths, a T604 and a T650.

In 2015, the Hall of Fame's display space was doubled in size, by the opening of the 2,000 m^{2} JJ Hurley Pavilion, named in honour of the Hall of Fame's inaugural chairman. As of February 2026, the Hall of Fame's collection included 18 restored Kenworths and 29 Kenworths supplied brand new, and the available display space was almost at capacity.

== See also ==
- Old Ghan Heritage Railway and Museum
- List of transport museums
