= North Australia Railway =

Former railway line in Northern Territory, Australia

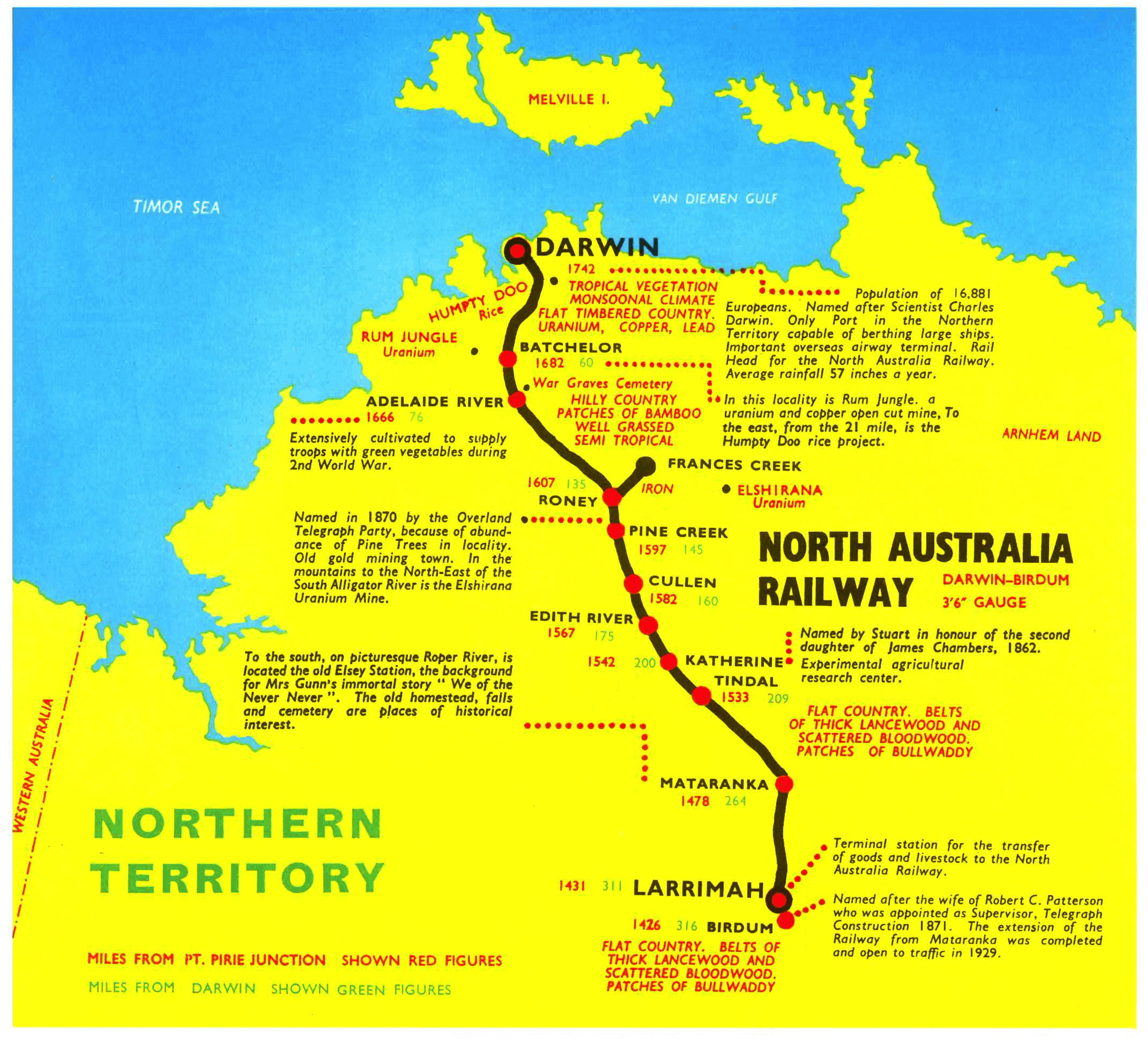
- Excerpt from a 1960s Commonwealth Railways map showing the North Australia Railway

Technical
- Line length: 509 km (316 mi)
- Track gauge: 1,067 mm (3 ft 6 in)

The North Australia Railway was a 509 km (316 mi) 1,067 mm (3 ft 6 in) narrow gauge railway in the Northern Territory of Australia which ran from the territory capital of Darwin, once known as Palmerston, to Birdum, just south of Larrimah. Initially its name was the Palmerston and Pine Creek Railway. The first section was opened 1889, the last in 1929. The railway closed in 1976.

== Beginnings – South Australian Railways ==
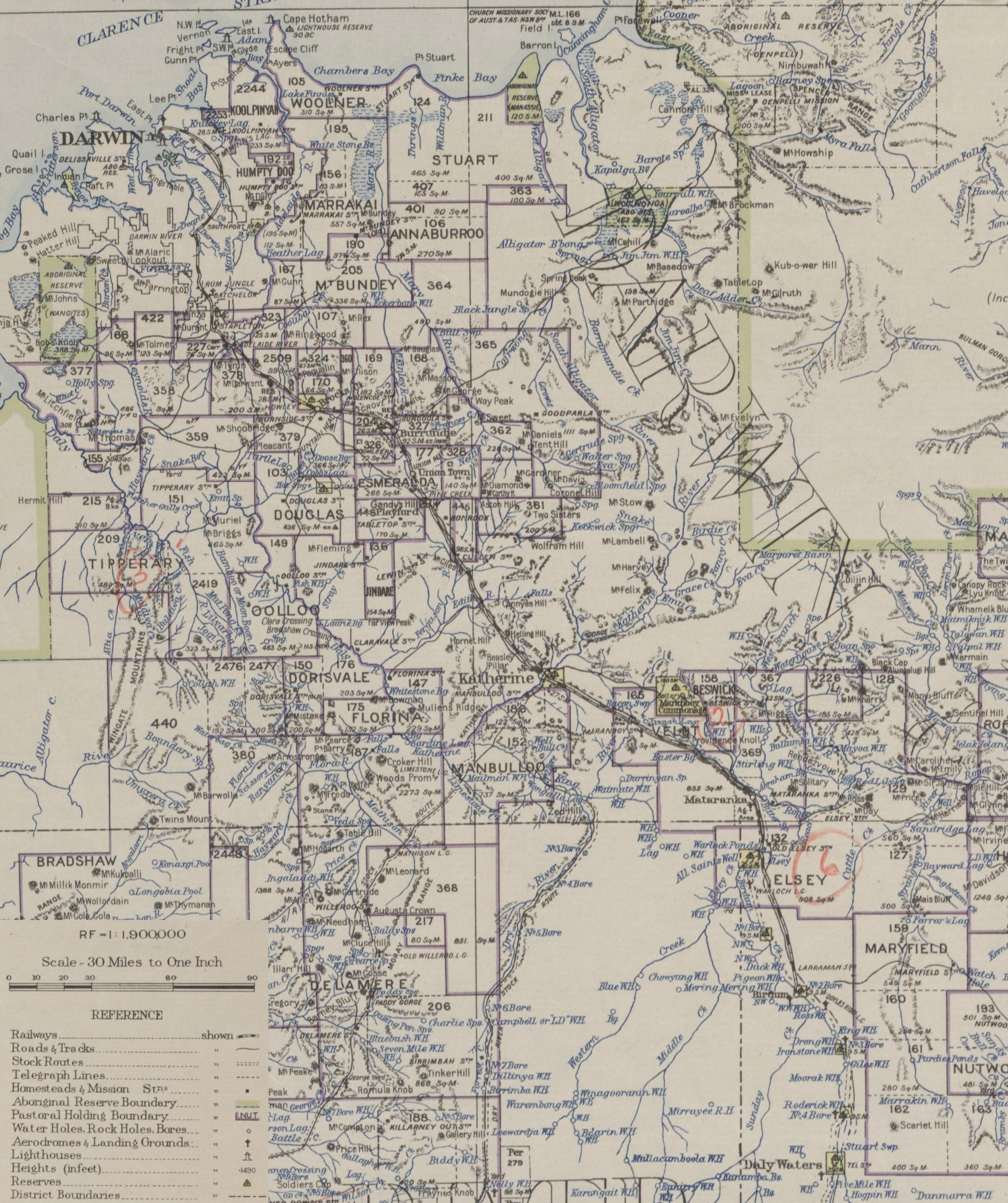
A 1936 map of the Top End, with the North Australia Railway shown

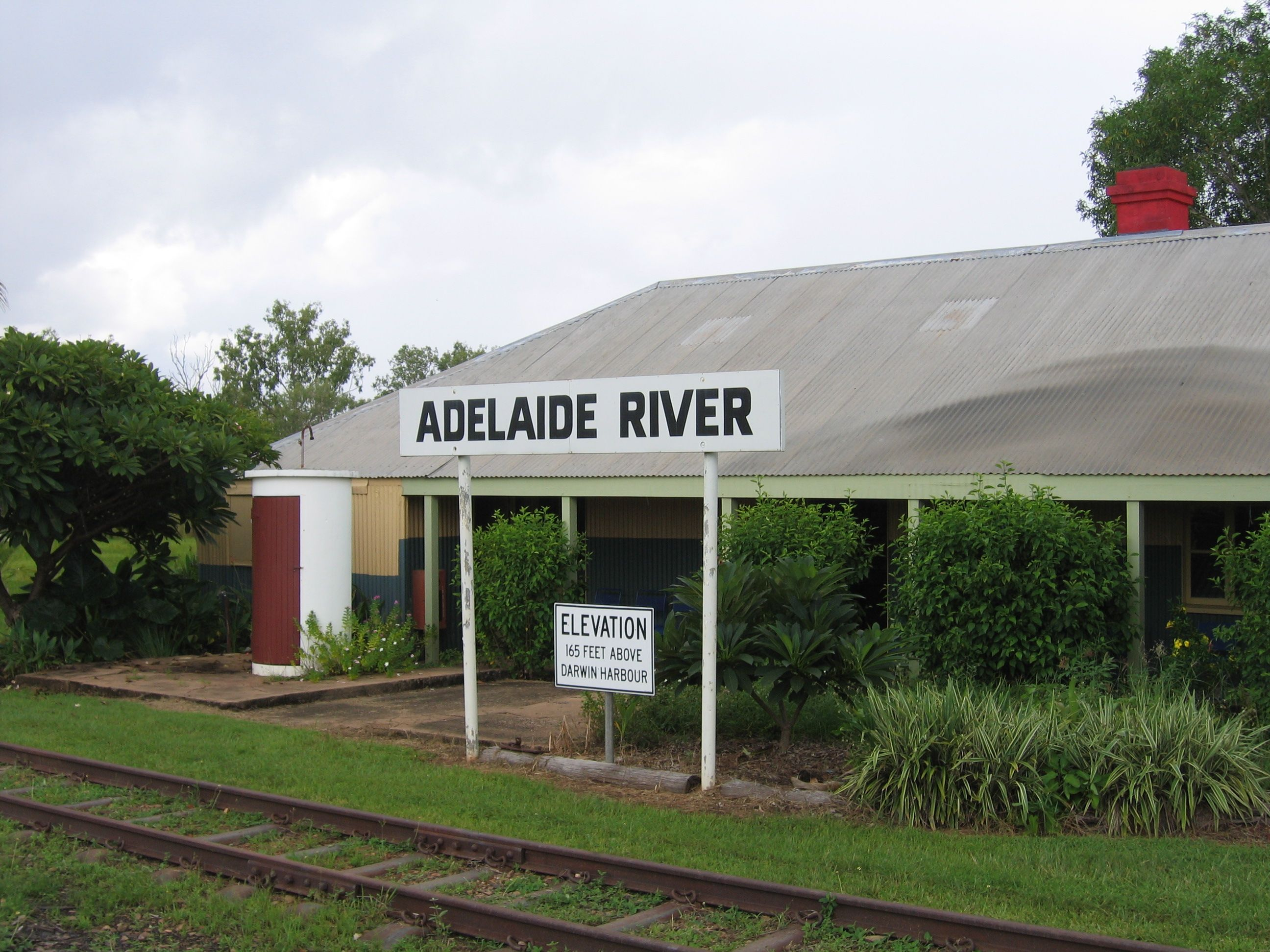
The former station at Adelaide River, on the Stuart Highway, is now a museum housing locomotives, rolling stock and memorabilia

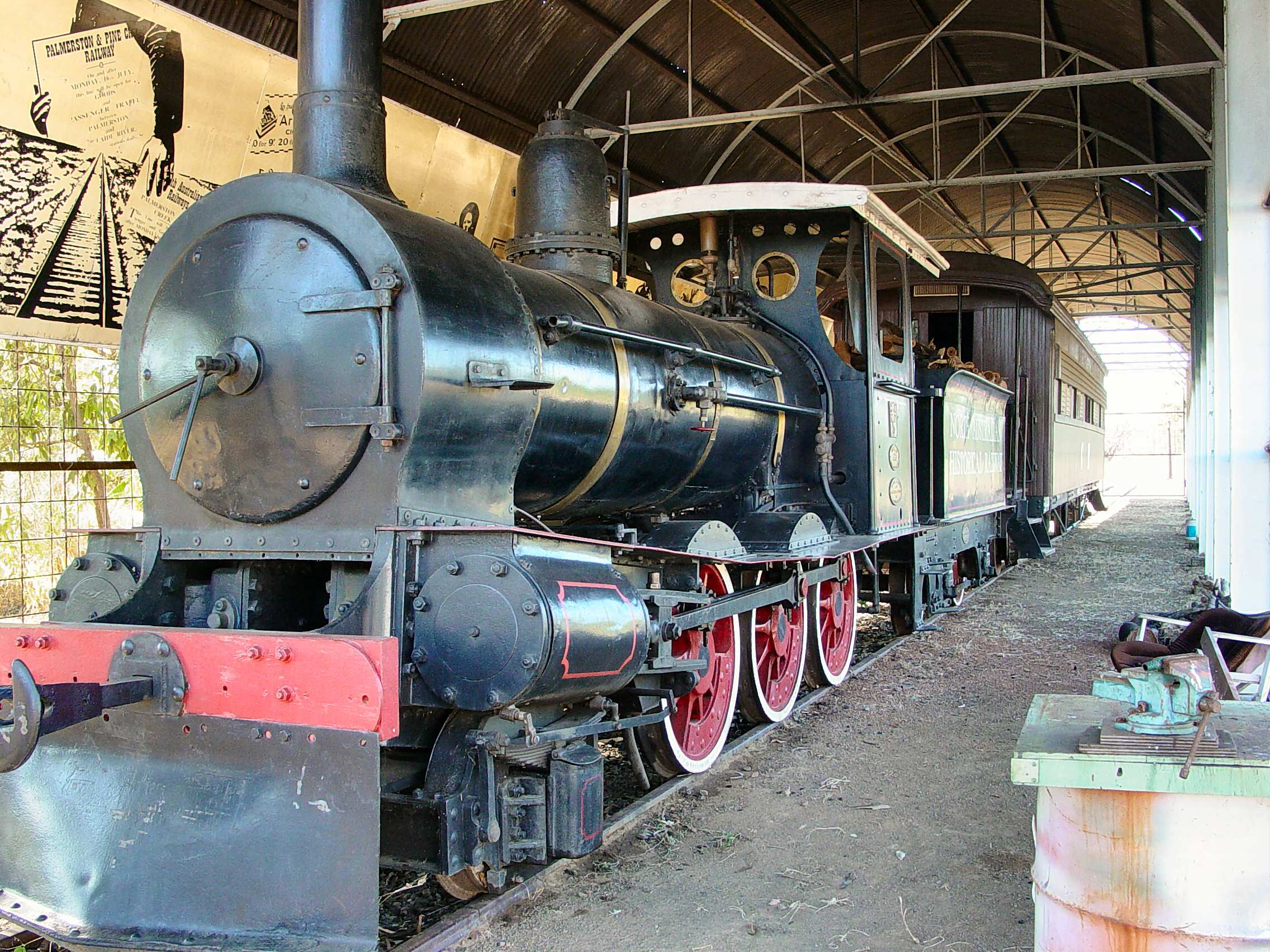
Commonwealth Railways narrow-gauge steam locomotive NF5, preserved at Pine Creek Railway Precinct, was built by Beyer, Peacock and Company in 1877 for the South Australian Railways as W class locomotive no. 53. It was sold to contractors for construction of the Central Australia Railway and two lines on Eyre Peninsula (being re-purchased each time by the SAR), and the Palmerston and Pine Creek Railway, on which it stayed.

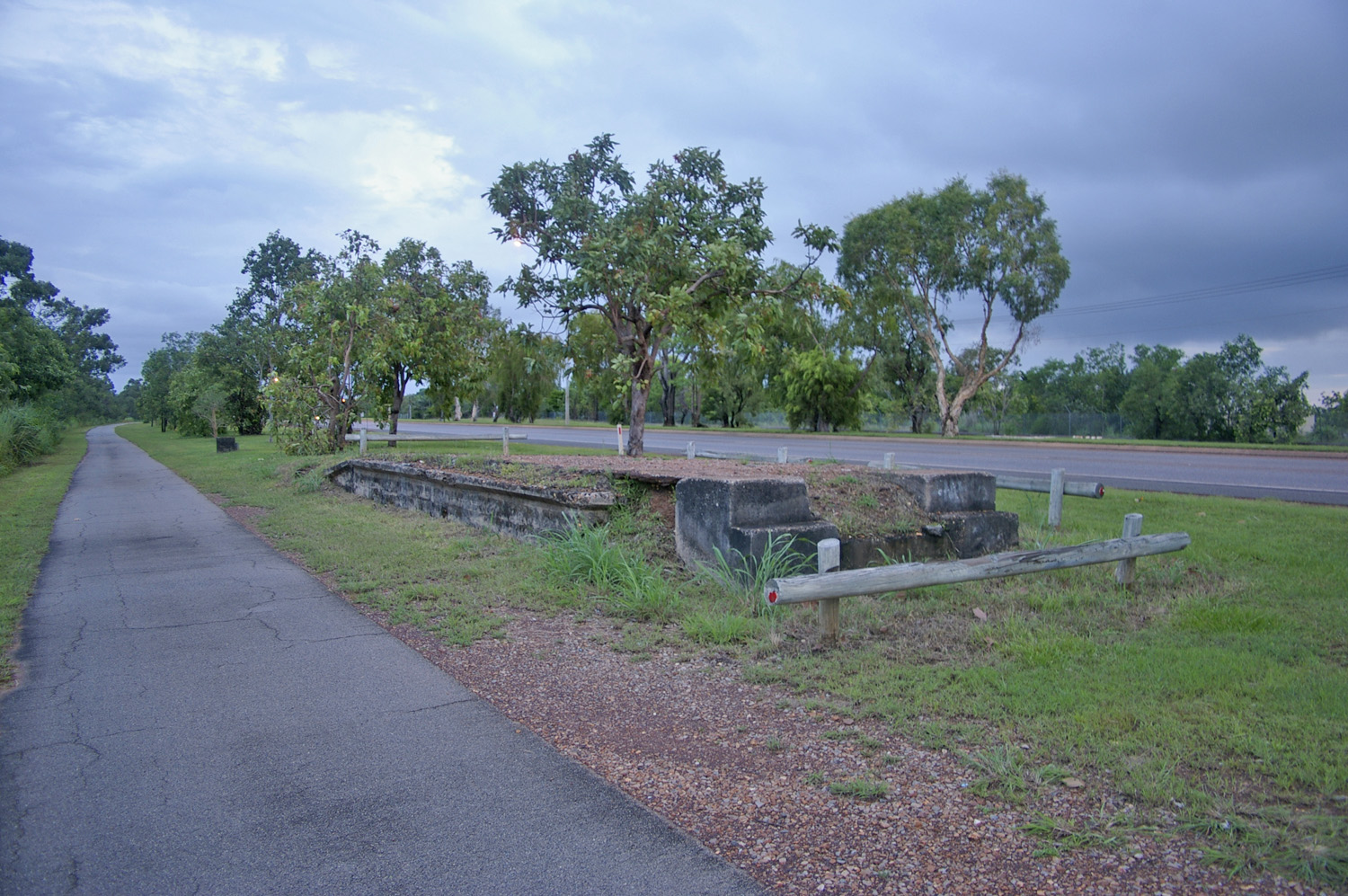
One of very few remnants of the North Australia Railway in Darwin is a platform in the suburb of Winnellie

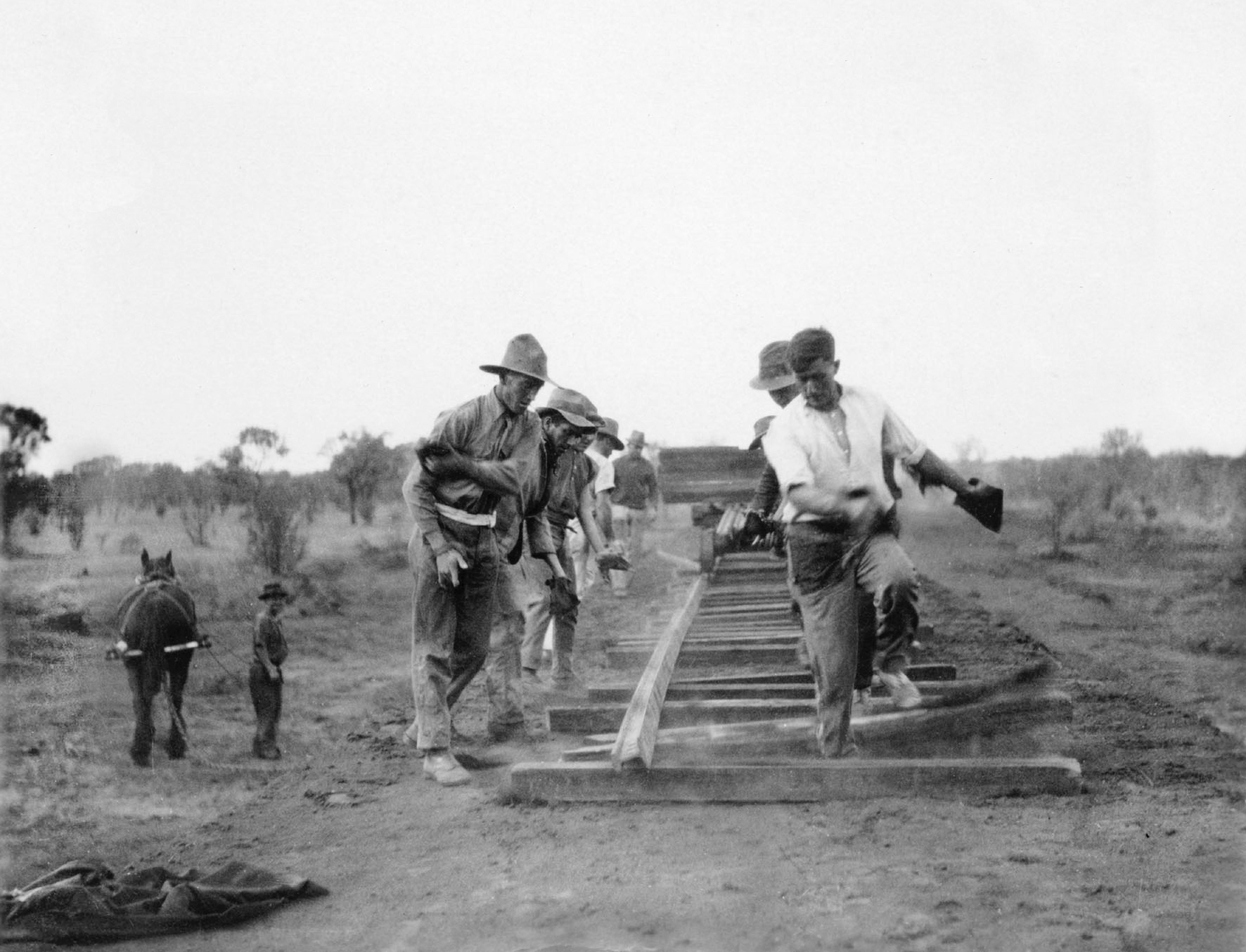
Men built narrow-gauge lines of the Northern Territory and South Australia without benefit of the mechanisation their successors enjoyed when building the standard-gauge lines a century later

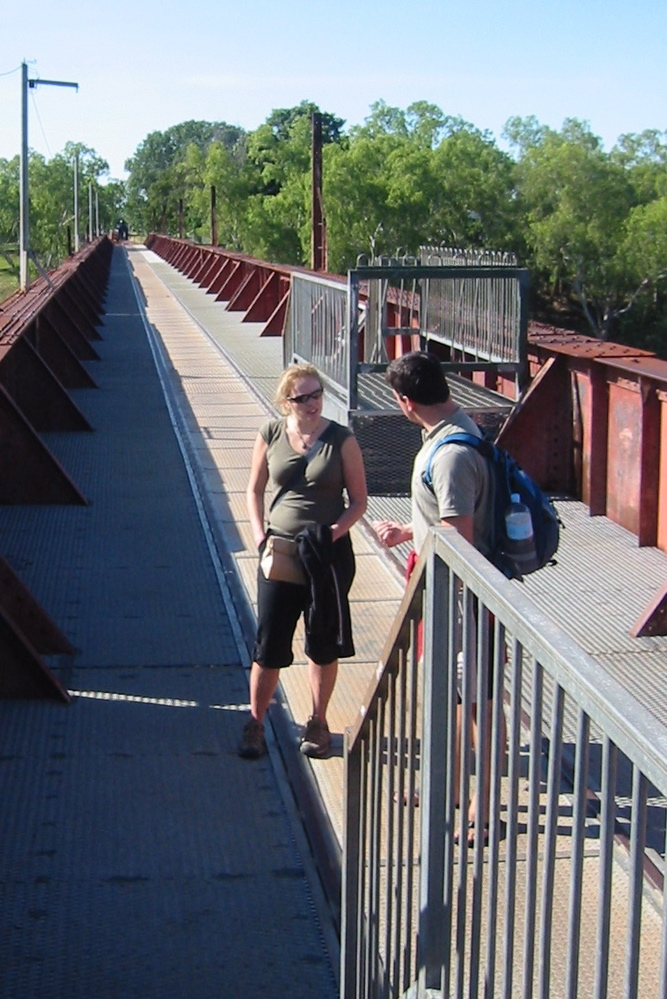
Former North Australia Railway bridge across the Katherine River, re-purposed as a footbridge

Between 1863 and 1911 the Northern Territory was administered by the Government of South Australia. In 1883, that government instituted the Palmerston and Pine Creek Railway Act, which resulted in a £959,300 contract being awarded to C. & E. Millar of Melbourne. The line reached Pine Creek in 1888 and officially opened on 30 September 1889 as the northernmost outpost of the South Australian Railways. Singhalese and Indian gangs did the grubbing and earthwork and 3000 Chinese labourers laid more than a kilometre of track per day. More than 300 bridges and flood openings were built. (Note: A detailed interactive map is here.)

== Transfer to the Commonwealth government ==
As a consequence of Federation, the Commonwealth (or federal) government took ownership of the railway in 1911, having undertaken to connect Darwin with Adelaide by rail – but, crucially, without the completion date being specified. Since the federal government did not yet have its own railways department, the railway was leased back to the South Australian Government and worked as part of the South Australian railway system. World War I intervened, although in 1917 the line was extended 90 km (56 mi) to the northern bank of the Katherine River.

By 1920, public interest in the idea of a north–south transcontinental railway had taken hold. However, the legal opinion of the federal attorney-general left open an interpretation that the route could be from anywhere across South Australia's northern border. Queensland interests pressed strongly for a route from the north-east corner of the state, near Birdsville, and north into the pastoral lands of Queensland before joining the existing line at Katherine River. This would involve the Central Australia Railway taking a sharp turn to the east from its established railhead at Oodnadatta for a diversion about 600 km (370 mi) east of the initially intended route through the centre of the continent via Alice Springs. The federal government referred the matter to the parliamentary standing committee on public works to examine the whole question. At the same time, it authorised an extension of the line in the Northern Territory southwards to Mataranka. This was in keeping with a changed Commonwealth viewpoint – that the start of the transcontinental railway was to be in the Northern Territory, not South Australia. The committee's report, completed in late 1922, recommended that the Port Darwin to Katherine River railway be extended to Daly Waters and eventually be extended further south to Newcastle Waters before heading to the Queensland border, and that a light line be built from Oodnadatta to Alice Springs. Further, when the time arrived for construction of a transcontinental railway, the route that would be in the best interests of Australia should be selected. When the report had been accepted, further delays occurred and it was not until 1926 – 14 years after assuming ownership – that the federal government assumed actual control of the line and named it the North Australia Railway; it also took over the Central Australia Railway.

In 1929, the Commonwealth Railways extended the North Australia Railway southwards to what was to be its final terminus, Birdum, and extended the Central Australia Railway northwards to its final terminus at Alice Springs. There remained a gap of more than 800 km (500 mi) to be bridged before Australia's ambitions could be fulfilled.

== Operation ==
In the early years of its operation under Commonwealth control, traffic was light, which, given its light engineering, was for the best. In 1930, a mixed (i.e., freight and passenger) train, which Territorians had nicknamed Leaping Lena, ran to an established timetable:

- depart Darwin at 08:00 on Wednesdays
- arrive at Pine Creek at 16:46
- depart Pine Creek at 08:00 on Thursdays
- arrive at Katherine at 11:00 on Fridays
- depart Katherine at 12:00
- arrive at Birdum at 17:51 on Fridays.

The leisurely pace was to vanish in 1942.

== World War II ==
On the outbreak of the Pacific War, the Australian Army surveyed a rail route for the gap between Birdum and Alice Springs, on which freight had to be carried by road vehicles, but a line was not constructed. The railway experienced very heavy traffic since it was a strategic route to operations north of Australia. In 1944, as many as 147 trains ran per week. Larrimah, 9 kilometres (5.6 miles) kilometres north of Birdum, was used as the railhead because, unlike Birdum, it was on the Stuart Highway. (Note: As of 2018 the 100 metres (110 yards) long rail bridge across Birdum Creek, 3 kilometres (2 miles) south of Larrimah, was still in place.)

Some wartime improvements were made, however, including new locomotive depots, expanded workshops and additional locomotive water supplies. However, personnel, locomotive power and rolling stock were in critically short supply. In desperation, the Commonwealth Railways converted cattle cars (by lining the open-planked sides and installing toilets) to transport troops northwards.

== Proposed extensions ==
A private company proposed a railway from Birdum to Bourke, New South Wales in 1932.

A railway from Dajarra, Queensland to Birdum was considered in 1952-53 but the federal Cabinet decided not to proceed. Construction of a standard gauge railway to Darwin was first seriously proposed in 1965 when construction of a new standard gauge line to Alice Springs was discussed.

== Closure ==
In May 1976, the federal government ordered the closure of the entire North Australia Railway line, mainly as a result of the loss of iron ore traffic originating from the Frances Creek mine. All services ceased on 30 June. Maintenance gangs were withdrawn in December 1977. Heavy floods in 1978 destroyed parts of the railway, effectively eliminating any prospect of the railway re-opening. In 1985, some rails and steel sleepers were lifted and sent for use in Tasmania.

== Heritage listing ==
The Pine Creek railway precinct has been placed in the Northern Territory Heritage Register. It is in the care of the National Trust Northern Territory, as is the Katherine railway station.

== Standard-gauge line ==
Nearly 20 years after the line between Tarcoola and Alice Springs was opened, a consortium was formed to build a standard gauge line between Alice Springs and Darwin. Construction was undertaken with amazing speed and efficiency, lasting 32 months from July 2001 to September 2003. The line broadly followed the original narrow-gauge route between Adelaide River and Emungalan but about 70 per cent of the whole route was on a new alignment. Modern engineering standards, much higher than those of its 19th century predecessor, resulted in none of the infrastructure on the alignment, such as it was, being retained other than the Fergusson River bridge. (Note: 14.1816°S 132.0357°E.) The first freight train from Adelaide reached Darwin in January 2004 and the first passenger service (The Ghan) from Adelaide to Darwin in February 2004, finally fulfilling the 121-year dream of a north–south transcontinental railway.

== Bibliography ==
- Anchen, Nick (2017). Iron Roads in the Outback: The Legendary Commonwealth Railways. Ferntree Gully, Vic: Sierra Publishing. ISBN 9780992538828.
- Harvey, JY (1987). The Never-Never Line: The story of the North Australia Railway. South Yarra: Hyland House. ISBN 0-947062-20-3.
