= Old Ghan Heritage Railway and Museum =

Railway museum at Alice Springs, Northern Territory, Australia

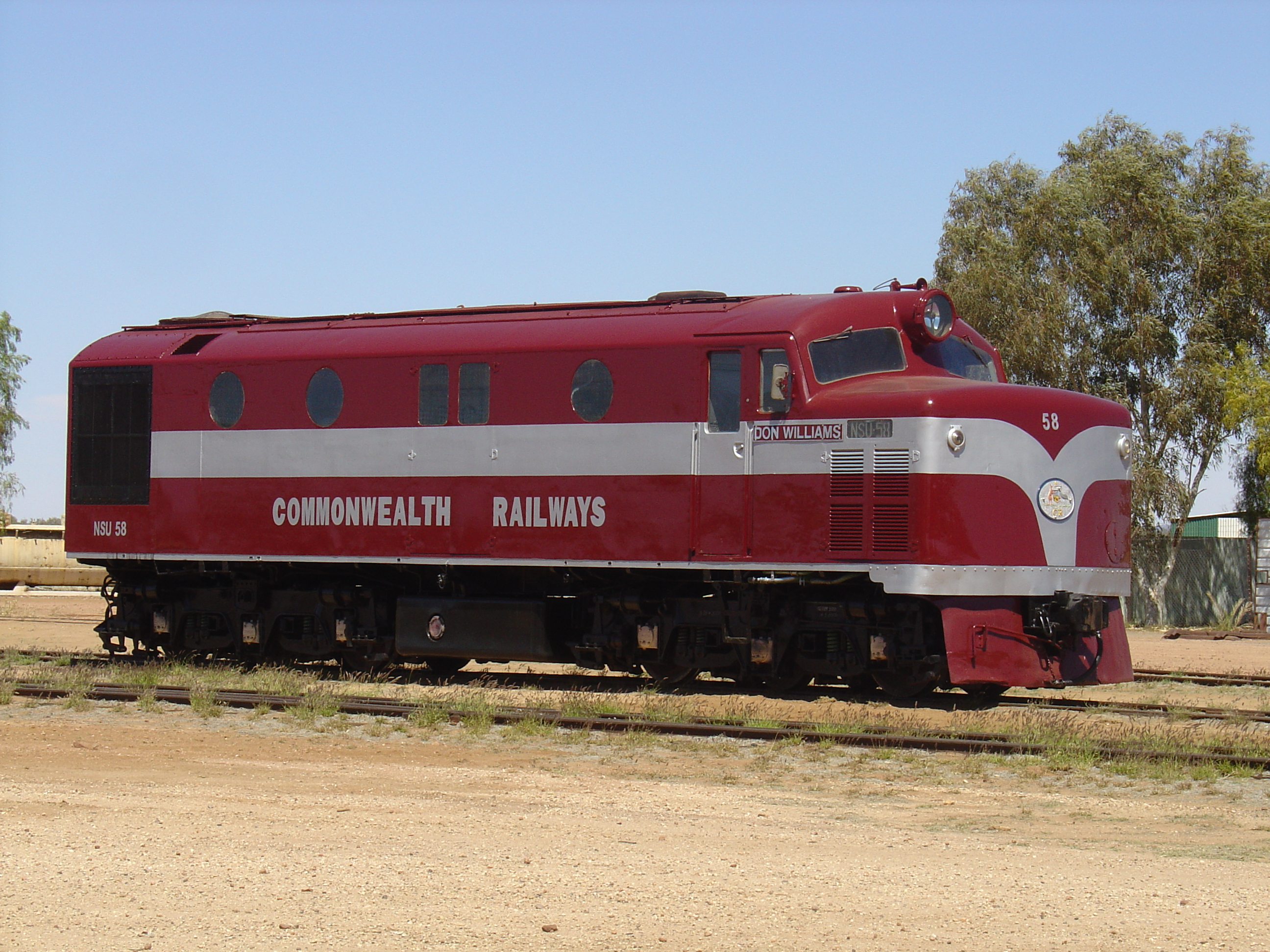
- A former Commonwealth Railways diesel-electric locomotive at the Old Ghan Heritage Railway and Museum in 2006
- Established: 1981
- Location: Norris Bell Avenue, Alice Springs, Northern Territory, Australia
- Coordinates: 23.7777°S 133.8681°E
- Type: Railway

The Old Ghan Heritage Railway and Museum is an Australian railway museum in Alice Springs, in the Northern Territory. It was attached to a narrow-gauge tourist railway line, now closed. The Road Transport Historical Society, which also owns the adjacent National Road Transport Hall of Fame, operates the museum.

== History ==
Following the closure of the Central Australia Railway after a new standard gauge line from Tarcoola to Alice Springs opened in 1980, the Ghan Preservation Society was formed in 1981. The society operated from a site at McDonnell Siding, 6.4 kilometres (4.0 miles) south of Alice Springs. A stimulus in the form of an Australian Bicentennial Authority grant of $800,000 was received in 1987, funding the construction of a replica South Australian Railways station building, and a lease arranged with the Australian National Railways Commission made it possible for the society to operate tourist trains from October 1988 on the 25 km (16 mi) track southwards to Ewaninga Siding.

The society's trains – four a week during the early 1990s – were hauled by a former WAGR W class steam locomotive and a Commonwealth Railways NSU class diesel locomotive hauling carriages previously used on The Ghan.

In 1995, the society encountered financial difficulties, severed ties with the adjacent Road Transport Hall of Fame (later restored), and lost many volunteers. Train services stopped in 2001 and locomotives and rolling stock were put on static display. By 2005, locomotives and rolling stock had been vandalised and the track was falling into disrepair; press reports described conflict between members who wanted to "[hand] over the attraction to paid staff" and those who wanted to "rekindle interest from volunteer workers". The project was described in November 2020 as "all but forgotten for more than a decade but now the subject of an energetic revival effort" involving support from the local community and businesses to restore locomotives, rolling stock and the railway line. Proponents acknowledged many challenges but said that Alice Springs would "have a huge tourist drawcard and a fun transportation park for locals alike" if they succeeded.
