= Adelaide River railway station =

Former railway station in Northern Territory, Australia

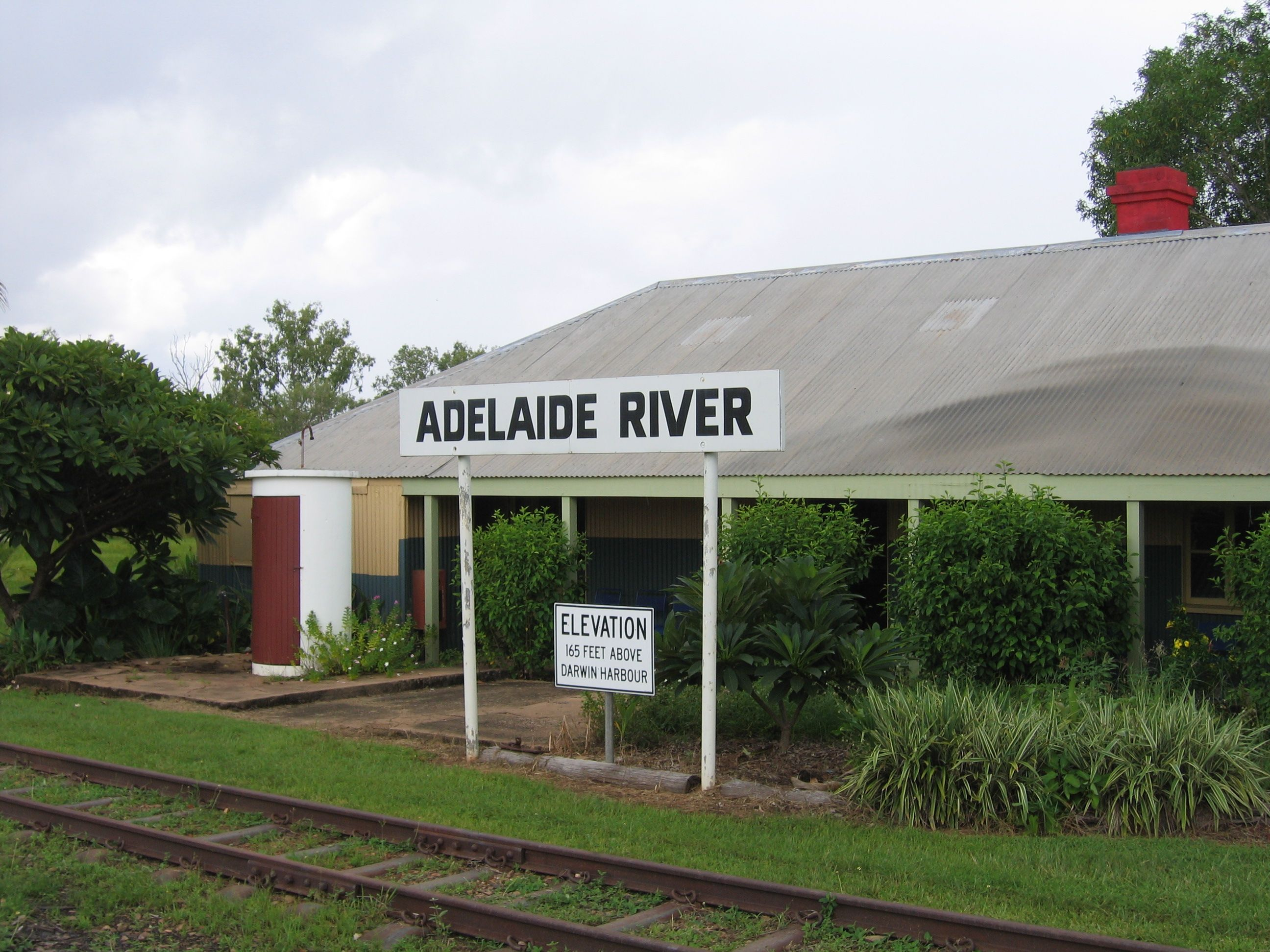

General information
- Coordinates: 13°14′37″S 131°06′45.85″E
- Line: North Australia Railway
- Distance: 124 km (77 mi)
- Platforms: 1
- Tracks: 2

History
- Opened: 1889
- Closed: 1976
Location

Adelaide River railway station is a former railway station on the now-closed narrow-gauge North Australia Railway, in the Northern Territory, Australia, 124 kilometres (77 miles) south of the Darwin terminus of the line. Now a museum with exhibits that include buildings, rolling stock and memorabilia, it is located on the main north–south road route through the Northern Territory, the Stuart Highway. It was one of the most significant stations on the line; the only station with a refreshment room. Former Commonwealth Railways diesel locomotive NSU 63 is displayed between the highway and the station.

== History ==
=== North Australia Railway 1889 – 1976 ===
The station officially opened in 1889, following the completion of the bridge across the Adelaide River in December 1888. The station building featured staff accommodation and a refreshment room for passengers. At the rear of the building, a reservoir and overhead water tank were provided for the steam locomotives working the line. In 1911, when administration of the Northern Territory was transferred to the Commonwealth Government, South Australian Railways control of the line and stations were assumed by Commonwealth Railways.

From 1918, an annual picnic was held at the station, which was shut down for the day to allow railway workers a day of rest and relaxation by the river. The tradition eventually became a public holiday in the Northern Territory even after the closure of the line, with the Picnic Day holiday falling on the first Monday in August each year. Traditional railway picnics are still held at the station by the Friends of the North Australia Railway to mark the occasion.

Improvements were made to the station precinct during the 1920s and 30s, including a turning triangle for locomotives, livestock loading facilities and a new post office, telephone exchange and banking services.

During World War II, the township of Adelaide River became an important military base, and a large field hospital was established near the railway station. A siding was added to serve a hospital train. A large depot was also established on the northern side of the river, served by trains delivering supplies to the military camps from the Port of Darwin, and a spur line constructed to the armoury at Snake Creek. At that time, the traffic on the line had increased eight times compared to the pre-war years and in 1943 Adelaide River station serviced most of the 247 trains per week using the line. On 15 March 1941, a No. 12 Squadron Wirraway aircraft crashed near the railway station, killing both crew members.

Following the war, use of the North Australia Railway began to decline. A hotel and liquor licence were granted to the operators of the station refreshment rooms in the 1940s, but with the introduction of diesel locomotives in 1957 the stopping times at the station were reduced considerably and the licence was transferred to another site. By 1958, the single weekly train to Larrimah only stopped at the station for ten minutes in the evening.

The station yard was rationalised in 1967 and many of the wartime sidings were removed. The rails were upgraded and the loop siding extended to accommodate the heavy iron ore trains from Frances Creek. by then the only significant traffic on the line. Following the failure of that venture and damage caused by Cyclone Tracy in 1974, the Australian National Railways Commission closed the line in 1976; the last passenger service stopped at the station on 29 June.

=== Preservation ===
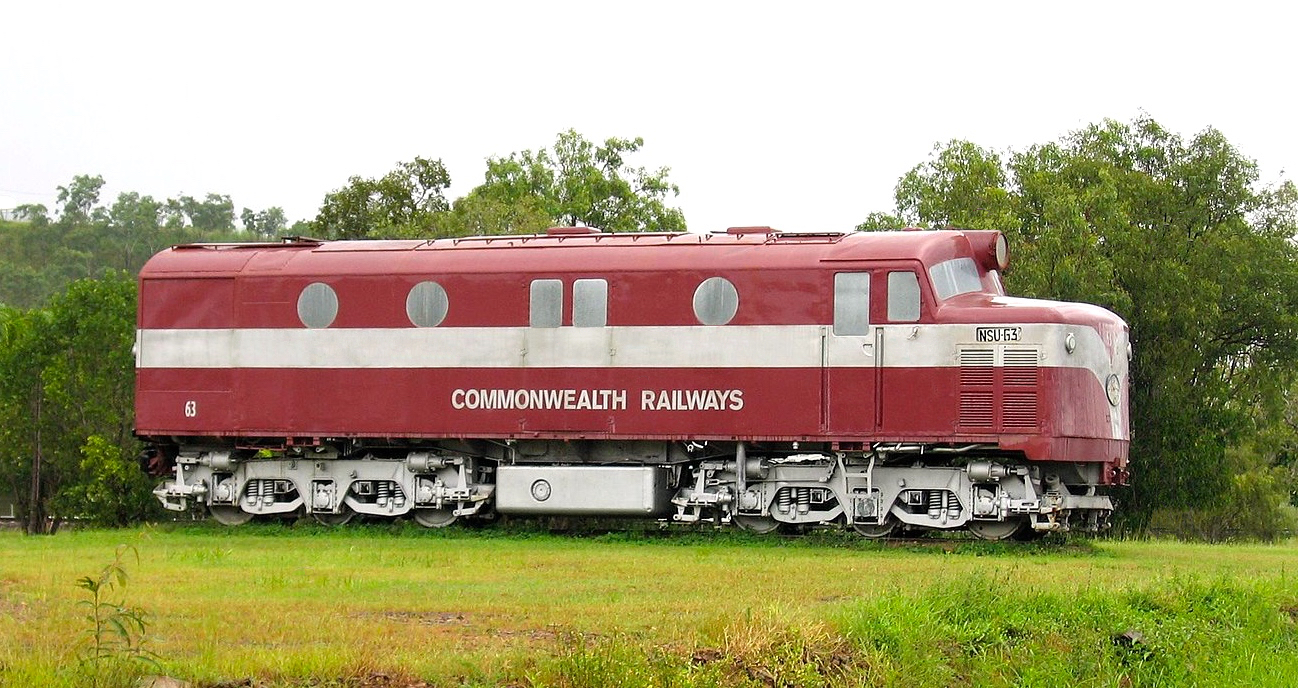
Static-displayed diesel locomotive NSU63 beside the Stuart Highway at the Adelaide River Rail Heritage Precinct

The station was abandoned following the closure of the line and began to fall into disrepair. In 1985, the building was added to the Register of the National Estate, because of its historical significance in the early settlement and wartime defence of the Northern Territory. Restoration works were completed in 1988 and the building was opened as a museum.

In 2001, an incorporated charitable association, Friends of the North Australian Railway at Adelaide River, was formed and has operated the museum, known as the Adelaide River Railway Heritage Precinct, on behalf of the National Trust. The society maintains the main station building and some rolling stock, memorabilia and associated infrastructure in the Adelaide River yard and other locations along the former line. A goal for the society has been to restore a section of track north from the station to the Snake Creek armoury and to run a tourist train, although little progress has been made on this since the 2004 opening of the standard-gauge Adelaide–Darwin railway on a parallel route through the town.

In 2004, when the final leg of the Adelaide–Darwin rail corridor was opened between Alice Springs and Darwin, new standard gauge tracks were laid through the former yard at Adelaide River, leaving two of the original narrow gauge tracks for use by the museum.

In 2007, a precinct including the railway station was listed under the name of "Adelaide River railway siding and railway bridge" on the Northern Territory Heritage Register.
