= City Tour Line 10 =

Rotterdam historic tram service for tourists

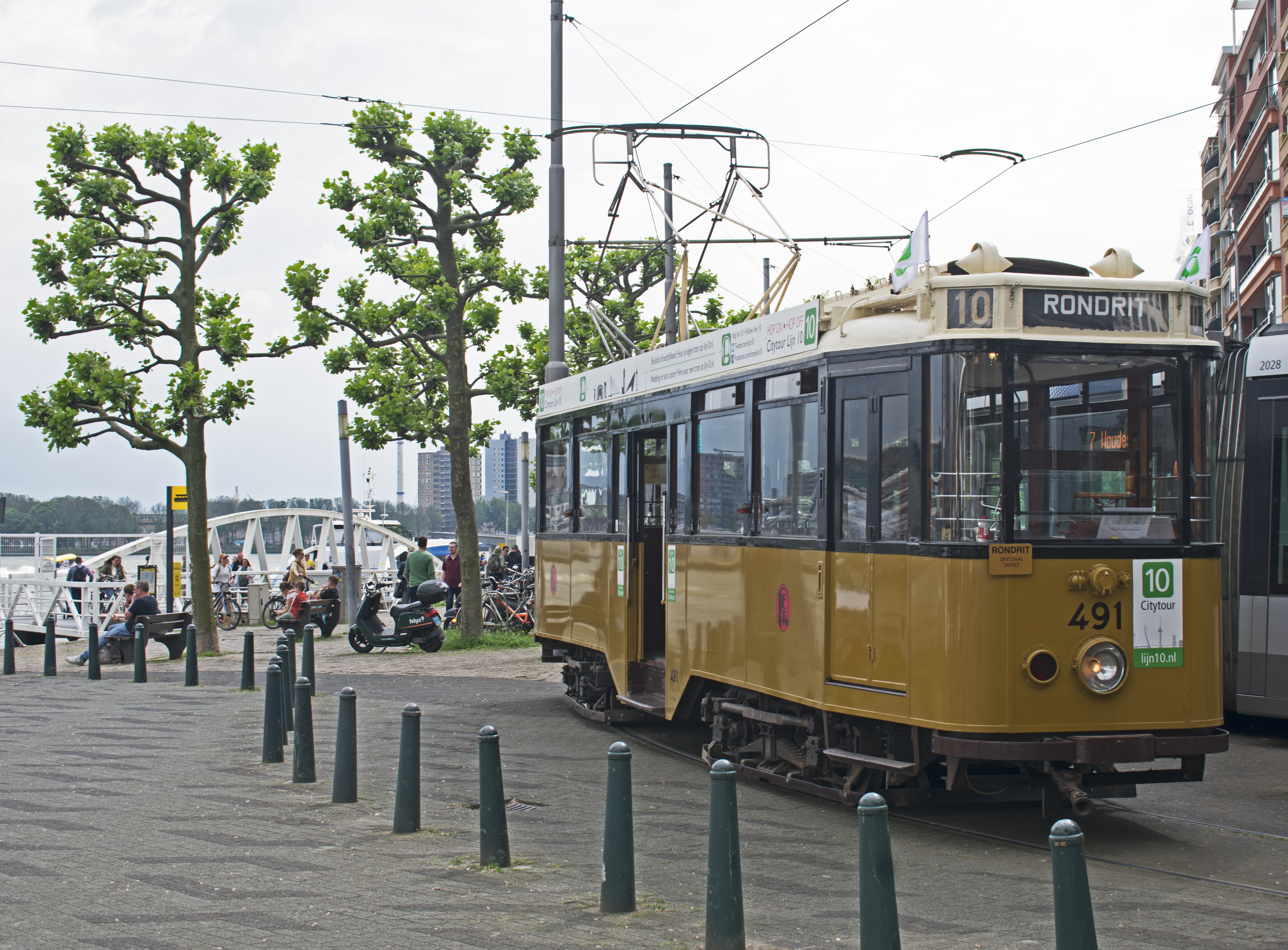
A tram vehicle of line 10 at the Willemsplein stop

City Tour Line 10 is a tram line in the Dutch city of Rotterdam, designed for tourist purposes and operating on a hop-on hop-off basis. A fixed route is operated on the Rotterdam tram network using historic tram vehicles owned by the Rotterdam public transport company RET. The service is operated by volunteers from the Rotterdam Public Transport Museum. The tram vehicles display the number 10 on the front of the vehicle, along with the Dutch text: 'rondrit' (English: 'tour'). The official starting point of the route is the Willemsplein stop, located at the foot of the Erasmus Bridge.

Tram line 10 operates on weekends during several months of the year. During the summer months, additional services are also provided on Thursdays and Fridays. As the tram line is not part of the regular public transport system, passengers are required to purchase a separate ticket, which can be obtained at the tourist information office at Rotterdam Central Station or from the tram conductor. The ticket is valid for the entire day. Passengers are allowed to hop on and off at any stop along the route. To disembark, passengers must press the stop button inside the tram to notify the staff. To board the tram, waiting passengers are expected to signal the driver with a hand gesture as the tram approaches; otherwise, the tram may not stop.

All staff working on tram line 10 are volunteers. Proceeds from ticket sales contribute to the preservation and maintenance of the historic vehicles. On days when the Rotterdam Public Transport Museum is open, passengers can transfer to tram line 22 at Rotterdam Central Station. This is a shuttle tram, also operated by the museum.

== History ==
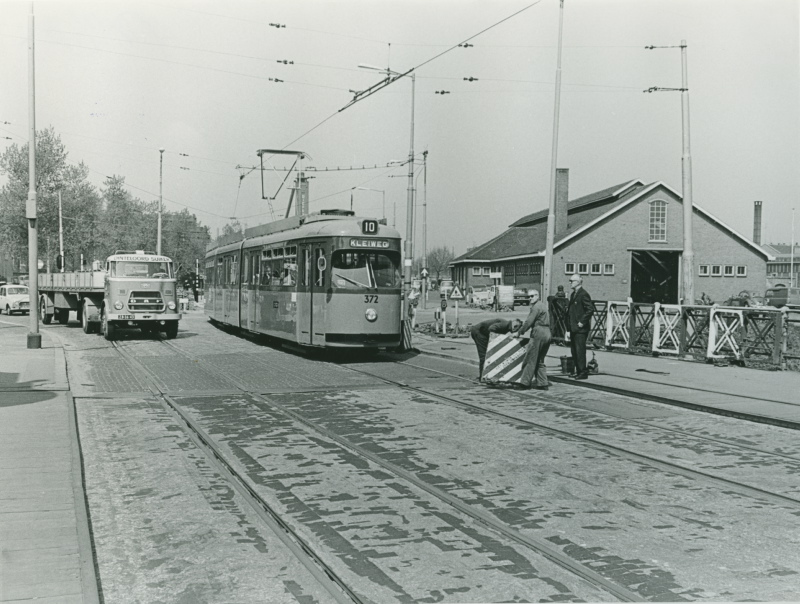
Tram line 10 during regular service in 1946.

Before tram line 10 was used for tourist purposes starting in 1990, it was previously part of the regular tram service. during the periods 1911–1934 and 1936–1967. From 1911 to 1934, tram line 10 operated between Zaagmolenstraat and the Ruigeplaatbrug. In 1933, the tram line had a free tram lane for the first time. From 1936 to 1967, the line ran from the Spangen district to Kootsekade. It was later extended from Kootsekade to Kleiweg. After several route changes in the following years, line 10 was replaced by another line number due to the opening of the metro in 1968.

== Rolling stock ==
Tram line 10 is operated with, among other vehicles, the following rolling stock.

Operating vehicles
Tramtype	Details	Image
Four-axle tram	These trams are guaranteed to operate on line 10. Occasionally, a trailer car is attached to increase passenger capacity.	
Düwag	They operate in a variety of color schemes.	
ZGT	These are the newest models in the collection and operate in various color schemes.	
Allan	Occasionally, a trailer car is attached to increase passenger capacity.	
Schindler	The only tram in the fleet where the conductor has his own cabin.	
