= List of transport museums =

A transport museum is a museum that holds collections of transport items, which are often limited to land transport (road and rail)—including old cars, motorcycles, trucks, trains, trams/streetcars, buses, trolleybuses and coaches—but can also include air transport or waterborne transport items, along with educational displays and other old transport objects. Some transport museums are housed in disused transport infrastructure such as dismantled trolley systems, former engine sheds or bus garages.

== Argentina ==
- Tramway Histórico de Buenos Aires, Caballito, Buenos Aires

== Australia ==
- Archer Park Rail Museum, Rockhampton, Queensland
- Australian National Maritime Museum, Sydney, New South Wales
- Australian Road Transport Heritage Centre, Gundagai, New South Wales
- Ballarat Tramway Museum, Ballarat, Victoria
- Bendigo Tram Museum, Bendigo, Victoria
- Brisbane Tramway Museum, Ferny Grove, Queensland
- Bus Preservation Society of Western Australia, Whiteman Park, Perth
- Canberra Railway Museum, Canberra, Australian Capital Territory
- Dorrigo Steam Railway & Museum, Dorrigo, New South Wales
- Glenreagh Mountain Railway, Glenreagh, New South Wales
- Goulburn Rail Heritage Centre, Goulburn, New South Wales
- Hawthorn tram depot, Hawthorn, Melbourne, Victoria
- Lachlan Valley Railway, Cowra, New South Wales
- National Railway Museum, Port Adelaide, South Australia
- National Road Transport Museum, Alice Springs, Northern Territory
- NSW Rail Museum, Thirlmere, New South Wales
- Old Ghan Heritage Railway and Museum, Alice Springs, Northern Territory
- Pichi Richi Railway – Quorn to Port Augusta, South Australia
- Puffing Billy Railway, Belgrave, Victoria
- Qantas Founders Museum, Longreach, Queensland
- Queensland Motorsport Museum, Ipswich, Queensland
- Rail Heritage WA, Bassendean, Western Australia
- Rail Motor Society, Paterson, New South Wales
- Revolutions Transport Museum, Whiteman Park, Western Australia
- Shepparton Motor Museum, Shepparton, Victoria
- South Australian Maritime Museum, Port Adelaide, South Australia
- Steamtown Heritage Rail Centre, Peterborough, South Australia
- Sydney Bus Museum, Leichhardt, Sydney, New South Wales
- Sydney Tramway Museum, Loftus, Sydney, New South Wales
- Tasmanian Transport Museum, Glenorchy, Tasmania
- Tramway Museum Society of Victoria, Bylands, Victoria
- Tramway Museum, St Kilda, South Australia
- Valley Heights Locomotive Depot Heritage Museum, Valley Heights, New South Wales
- Western Australia's Heritage Tramway, Whiteman Park, Western Australia
- WA Maritime Museum, Fremantle, Western Australia
- Zig Zag Railway, near Lithgow, New South Wales.

== Austria ==
- TMB's Innsbruck Tramway Museum, Innsbruck
- Graz Tramway Museum, Graz
- SKGLB-Museum, Mondsee
- Vienna Transport Museum Remise, Vienna

== Azerbaijan ==
- Heydar Aliyev Center
- Baku Auto Mall

== Belgium ==
- Brussels Tram Museum (MTUB (fr) / MSVB (nl)), Woluwe-Saint-Pierre, Brussels – streetcar/tram/trolleybus
- Tramsite Schepdaal, Schepdaal – streetcar/tram
- Centre de découverte du Vicinal, Trammuseum of the ASVi, Thuin – interurban and rural streetcar/tram
- Flemish Tram and Bus Museum (VlaTAM), Berchem, Antwerp – streetcar/tram/bus
- Musée des Transports en Commun de Wallonie (MTCW), Liège – streetcar / tram / interurban and rural tram / trolleybus / motorbus
- Train World, Schaerbeek — Railway Museum
- CFV3V, Mariembourg, Treignes — Railway Museum

== Bermuda ==
- Railway Museum and Curiosity Shop, Hamilton

== Brazil ==
- Museu Aeronáutico de Guarulhos, Guarulhos
- Museu Asas de um Sonho, São Carlos
- Museu do Automóvel de São Paulo, São Paulo
- Museu dos Transportes Públicos Gaetano Ferolla, São Paulo
- Museu Ferroviário Barão de Mauá, Jundiaí, – Railways (Avenida União dos Ferroviários)
- Museu Ferroviário de Bauru, Bauru
- Museu Ferroviário de Campinas, Campinas
- Museu Tecnológico Ferroviário, Santo André
- Museu American Old Trucks, Canela - Grupo Dreams
- Museu Hollywood Dreams Cars, Gramado - Grupo Dreams

== Bulgaria ==
- National Transport Museum, Rousse

== Canada ==
- Alberta Railway Museum, Edmonton, Alberta
- British Columbia Aviation Museum, Sidney, British Columbia
- Canadian Museum of Flight, Langley, British Columbia
- Canadian Railway Museum, Saint-Constant, Québec
- Canadian Transportation Museum & Heritage Village, Essex, Ontario
- Edmonton Radial Railway Society, Edmonton, Alberta
- Halton County Radial Railway, Rockwood, Ontario
- Marine Museum of the Great Lakes, Kingston, Ontario
- Muskoka Marine Museum, Huntsville, Ontario
- Railway Coastal Museum, St. John's, Newfoundland and Labrador
- Reynolds-Alberta Museum, Wetaskiwin, Alberta, automobiles
- Saskatchewan Railway Museum, Saskatoon Saskatchewan
- Western Canada Aviation Museum, Winnipeg, Manitoba
- Winnipeg Railway Museum, Winnipeg, Manitoba

== China Mainland ==
- China Aviation Museum, Datangshan, Changping, Beijing – (200 airplanes)
- China Railway Museum, Beijing
- Shanghai Metro Museum, Shanghai
- Shanghai Railway Museum, Shanghai

== Croatia ==
- Croatian Railway Museum, Zagreb (Croatian: Hrvatski željeznički muzej)

== Czech Republic ==
- National Technical Museum, Prague
- Prague Public Transport Museum, Prague
- Czech Railways Museum, Lužná (Czech: České dráhy Museum)
- Železniční muzeum Zlonice (Czech: Železniční muzeum Zlonice)
- Zubrnická museální železnice (Czech: Zubrnická museální železnice)
- Museum of Limestone Mining and Transport, Český Karst (Czech: Muzeum těžby a dopravy vápence)
- Pošumav Railway Museum, Nové Údolí (Czech: Muzeum Pošumavských železnic)
- Horse-drawn Railway Museum, České Budějovice (Czech: Muzeum koněspřežné železnice)
- Jaroměř Heating Plant (Czech: Výtopna Jaroměř)
- Mladějov Museum of Industrial Railways (Czech: Muzeum průmyslových železnic Mladějov)

== Denmark ==
- Bornholm Automobilmuseum, Bornholm, Region Hovedstaden
- Danish Railway Museum, Odense
- Danish Tramway Museum, Skjoldenæsholm, near Ringsted
- Dansk Veteranflysamling, Skjern, Midtsjælland – Scandinavian airplanes
- Vikingeskibsmuseet, Roskilde, Midtsjælland – Viking ships

== Estonia ==
- Estonian Railway Museum, Haapsalu

== Finland ==
- Finnish Railway Museum, Hyvinkää
- Aviation Museum of Central Finland, Tikkakoski, Central Finland
- Finnish Aviation Museum, Vantaa, near Helsinki's international airport
- Kotka Maritime Center

== France ==
- Cité de l'Automobile, Mulhouse : car museum
- Musée Français du Chemin de Fer : railway museum
- Musée Maurice Dufresne
- Musée de l'Aventure Peugeot, Sochaux, Kanton Sochaux-Grand-Charmont – Peugeot-Automobile
- Musée de Transports Urbains de France, Chelles : urban transport museum
- Musée des 24 Heures du Mans
- Musée de l'Air, Le Bourget : Airplane Museum
- National Car and Tourism Museum at Château de Compiègne : land transport including carriages and automobiles

== Germany ==
- PS Speicher in Einbeck
- Museum of Ancient Seafaring in Mainz
- DB Museum, Nuremberg, operated by Deutsche Bahn AG — rail transport in Germany
- Deutsches Schiffahrtsmuseum in Bremerhaven — water transport
- Otto-Lilienthal-Museum, air transport
- Eisenbahnmuseum Bochum, Bochum in the suburb Dahlhausen at the river Ruhr — railway museum
- Eisenbahnmuseum Neustadt Neustadt (Weinstrasse) in central Rhineland-Palatinate (Rheinland-Pfalz)
- Auto & Technik Museum, Sinsheim, Baden-Württemberg
- Hannoversches Straßenbahn-Museum, Sehnde near Hannover
- Deutsches Museum Verkehrszentrum, Munich, Bavaria
- Deutsches Museum Flugwerft, Oberschleißheim, Bavaria
- Deutsches Dampflokomotiv-Museum Neuenmarkt-Wirsberg in northern Bavaria
- MVG Museum, Munich, Bavaria
- Schifffahrtsmuseum Flensburg in Flensburg, Schleswig-Holstein
- Straßenbahnmuseum Dresden, Dresden, Sachsen
- Verkehrsmuseum Dresden, Dresden, Sachsen
- Verkehrsmuseum Frankfurt am Main, Frankfurt, Hesse
- Verein Historische Straßenbahn in Köln

== Greece ==
- Aegean Maritime Museum, Mykonos
- Andros Maritime Museum, Andros
- Electric Railways Museum of Piraeus
- Hellenic Air Force Museum, Athens
- Hellenic Maritime Museum, Piraeus
- Hellenic Motor Museum, Athens
- Nautical Museum of Crete, Chania
- Phaethon Museum of Technology (cars), Oropos
- Railway Museum of Athens
- Railway Museum of Thessaloniki
- Thessaly Railway Museum, Volos

== Hong Kong ==
- Hong Kong Maritime Museum, Central, City of Victoria
- Hong Kong Railway Museum, Tai Po District, New Territories

== Hungary ==
- Hungarian Railway History Park, Budapest – Railways
- Budapest Transport Museum, City Park (past), Diesel Hall - former Északi Vehicle Repair Center (future), Budapest
- Urban Public Transport History Museum, Szentendre.
- Millennium Underground Railway Museum, Deák Ferenc Square, Budapest.

== India ==
- Kursura Submarine Museum, Visakhapatnam, Andhra Pradesh - Submarine Museum
- TU 142 Aircraft Museum, Visakhapatnam, Andhra Pradesh - Aircraft Museum
- Heritage Transport Museum, Gurgaon, Haryana - Transport Museum
- Rail Museum, Howrah, West Bengal - Metro and Train museum
- National Rail Museum, New Delhi - Metro and Train museum
- Narrow Gauge Rail Museum, Nagpur - Narrow gauge Train Museum
- Smaranika Tram Museum, Kolkata - Tram Memorabilia inside an old tram
- Metro Museum, New Delhi - Metro museum inside Patel Chowk metro station

== Indonesia ==
- Ambarawa Railway Museum, Ambarawa
- Maritime Museum, Jakarta
- Museum Angkut, Batu
- Transport Museum, Taman Mini Indonesia Indah, Jakarta
- Kebon Vintage Cars Museum, Denpasar, Bali, Indonesia

== Ireland ==
- Ulster Folk and Transport Museum, Belfast
- National Maritime Museum of Ireland, Dublin – Ships
- National Transport Museum of Ireland, (Iarsmalann Náisiunta Iompair na hÉireann), Howth, Fingal
- Foynes Flying Boat Museum, Foynes – Flugboote

== Isle of Man ==
- Jurby Transport Museum, Jurby
- Manx Electric Railway Museum, Derby Castle, Douglas
- Manx Transport Museum, Peel
- Port Erin Railway Museum, Port Erin

== Israel ==
- Israel Railway Museum, Haifa –

== Italy ==
- Museo Ferrari, Maranello
- Ducati Museum, Bologna
- Museo Nazionale dell'Automobile, Turin
- Moto Guzzi Museum, Mandello del Lario
- Alfa Romeo Museum, Arese
- Museo Piaggio Giovanni Alberto Agnelli, Pontedera
- Museo Nazionale della Scienza e della Tecnologia, Milan
- Museo Nazionale dei Trasporti, La Spezia
- Museo Ferroviario Piemontese, Savigliano, Turin
- Volandia, Somma Lombardo
- Museo Ferroviario di Trieste Campo Marzio, Trieste
- Museo Nazionale Ferroviario di Pietrarsa, Naples

== Japan ==
- Honda Collection Hall, Motegi - automobiles, motorcycles
- Hiroshima City Transportation Museum, Hiroshima – Tramways
- Matsuda Collection, Gotemba, Shizuoka - automobiles
- Kyoto Railway Museum, Kyoto - Railway
- Modern Transportation Museum, Osaka, Osaka – Railways
- Nagahama Railroad Square, Nagahama, Shiga
- Ome Railway Park, Ome, Tokyo
- Railway Museum, Saitama, Saitama – Railway
- SCMaglev and Railway Park, Nagoya - Railway
- Tokyo Subway Museum, Tokyo
- Kyushu Railway History Museum, Kitakyushu, Fukuoka
- Tokyo Subway Museum, Tokyo
- Tokyo Transportation Museum, Tokyo (Closed)
- Toyota Automobile Museum, Nukata District, Aichi – Automobiles (also other brands)
- Umekōji Steam Locomotive Museum, Kyoto – Steam locomotives
- Usui Pass Railway Heritage Park, Annaka, Gunma - Railways
- Yokohama Municipal Tramway Museum, Yokohama

== Kuwait ==
- Historical, Vintage, and Classical Cars Museum, Kuwait City -
- Maritime Museum of Kuwait, Kuwait City, Kuwait

== Latvia ==
- Latvian Railway History Museum, Riga –
- Riga Motor Museum, Riga –

== Lithuania ==
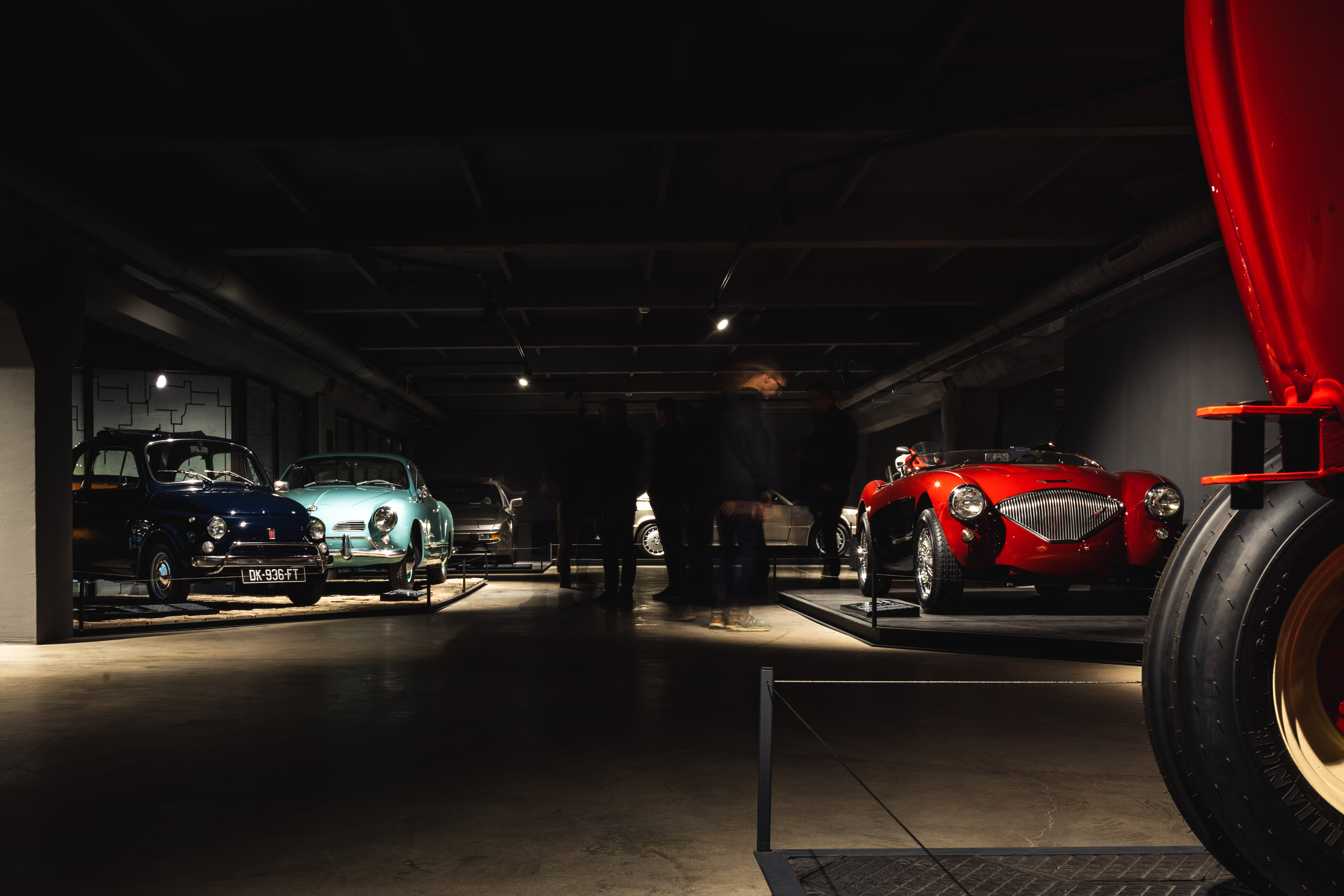
Automuseum Vilnius exhibition, Vilnius, Lithuania

- Automuseum Vilnius, Vilnius –
- Lithuanian Railway Museum, Vilnius –

== Luxembourg ==
- Luxembourg's tram and bus museum, Luxembourg City –

== Malaysia ==
- Muzium Pengangkutan Melaka of Melaka

== Mexico ==
- Ferrocarril Interoceanico heritage railway & museum. Cuautla, Morelos –
- Museo de los Ferrocarriles de Yucatán, Mérida, Yucatán,
- Museo Nacional de los Ferrocarriles Mexicanos, Puebla, Puebla
- Museo Tecnológico de la Comisión Federal de Electricidad (MUTEC), Mexico City
- Museo del Transporte, Xalapa, Veracruz
- Museo del Ferrocarril de Torreón, Torreón, Coahuila
- Museo de Transportes Eléctricos, Mexico City

== Namibia ==
- Trans-Namib Railroad Museum

== Netherlands ==
- Aviodrome, Lelystad, Flevoland – Aviation
- Electrische Museumtramlijn Amsterdam, Amsterdam, North Holland - Tramway
- DAF Museum, Eindhoven, North Brabant – Automobile
- Haags Openbaar Vervoer Museum, The Hague, South Holland – Streetcars/tram
- Nationaal Openbaar vervoer Museum NOV, Ouwsterhaule, Friesland – Railways/Busses
- Nationaal Bus Museum NBM, Hoogezand, Groningen – Busses
- Industrieel Smalspoor Museum, Erica, Drenthe - Industrial narrow gauge railway
- Louwman Museum - The Hague, South Holland – Automobile
- Marinemuseum Den Helder, Den Helder, North Holland – Ships (Koninklijke Marine)
- Museum Buurtspoorweg, Haaksbergen, Overijssel – Railways
- National Carriage Museum, Leek, Groningen (province) - Carriages
- Dutch Railway Museum, Utrecht (city), Utrecht (province) - – Railways
- Nederlands Transport Museum, Nieuw-Vennep, North Holland – air, road and rail vehicles
- NZH Public Transport Museum, Haarlem, North Holland - Public transport by the former NZH
- Museumstoomtram Hoorn-Medemblik, Hoorn, North Holland - Steamtram
- Rotterdam Public Transport Museum, Rotterdam - buses, trams and subway's
- RTM steam tramway museum, Ouddorp, South Holland - Narrow gauge steam- and diesel trams
- Stoom Stichting Nederland, Rotterdam, South Holland – Steamlocomotives
- Trammuseum Rotterdam, Rotterdam, South Holland - Trams
- Trolleybus Museum Arnhem, Arnhem, Gelderland - Trolley Busses
- Veluwsche Stoomtrein Maatschappij, Beekbergen, Gelderland – Railways
- Stoomtrein Katwijk Leiden, Valkenburg, South Holland – Narrow gauge, formerly known as Stoomtrein Valkenburgse Meer / Nationaal Smalspoormuseum

== New Zealand ==
- Christchurch City Tramway
- Ferrymead Heritage Park, Christchurch
- Foxton Trolleybus Museum, Horowhenua
- Museum of Transport & Technology, Auckland
- National Maritime Museum, Auckland
- National Transport & Toy Museum, Wānaka
- Otago Settlers Museum, Dunedin
- Packard and Pioneer Museum, Northland
- Southward Car Museum, Kāpiti Coast
- Wellington Tramway Museum, Kāpiti Coast
- Transport World, Invercargill

== Norway ==
- Old Voss Line Railway Museum, Bergen
- Krøderen Line Railway Museum, Krøderen –
- Norwegian Railway Museum, Hamar,
- Norwegian Aviation Museum, Bodø,
- Setesdal Line Railway Museum, Vennesla,
- Sporveismuseet Vognhall 5, Oslo – Tramway
- Trondheim Tramway Museum, Trondheim –
- Viking Ship Museum (Oslo), Oslo

== Pakistan ==
- PAF Museum, Karachi
- Pakistan Maritime Museum, Karachi
- Pakistan Railways Heritage Museum, near Islamabad

== Poland ==
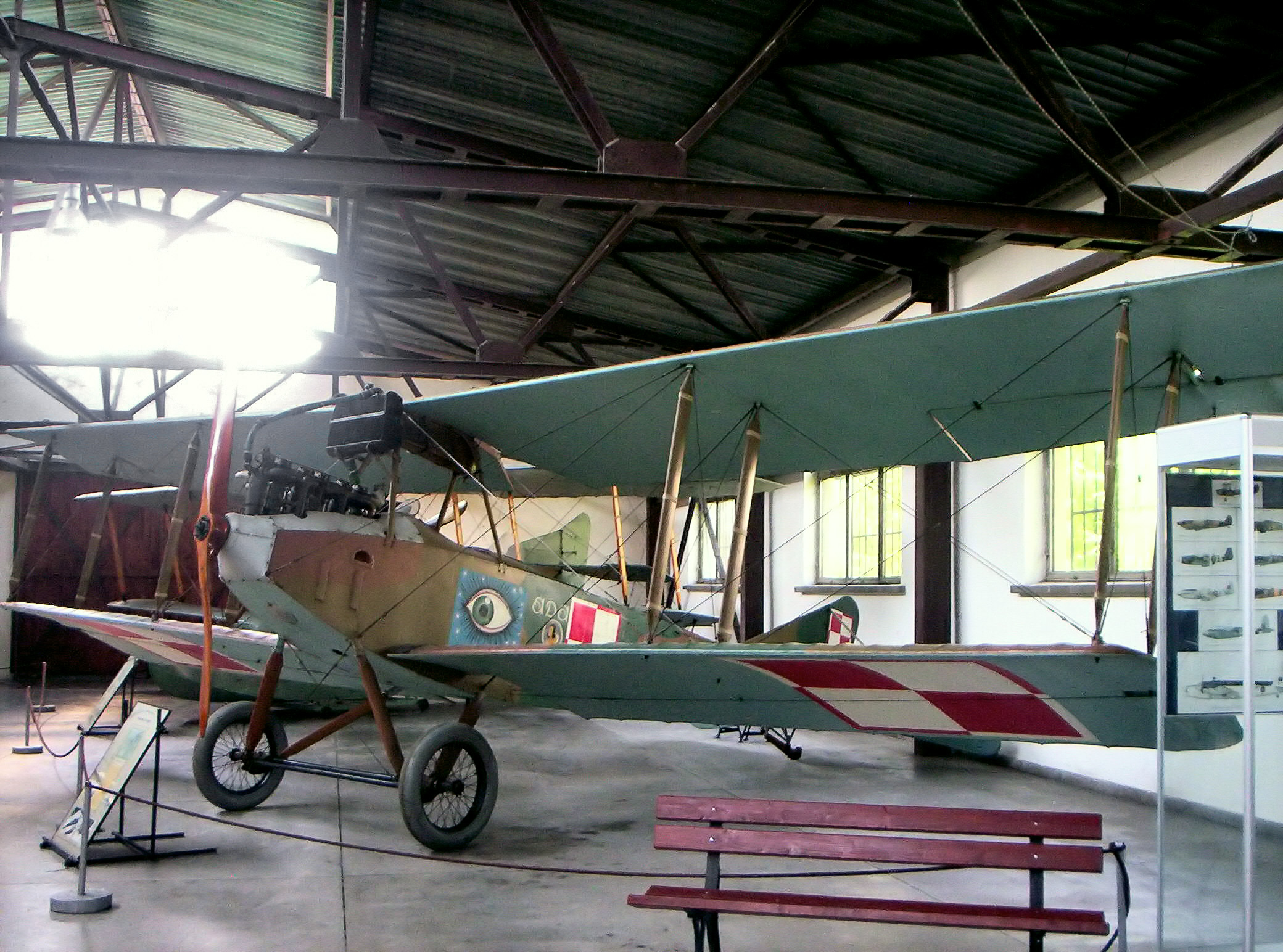
Polish Aviation Museum in Kraków

- Warsaw Railway Museum, Warsaw – Railways
- Polish Aviation Museum, Kraków, – Aviation
- Narrow Gauge Railway Museum in Gryfice, Gryfice, Woiwodschaft Westpommern – Railways
- Narrow Gauge Railway Museum in Wenecja, Wenecja, Kuyavian-Pomeranian Voivodeship – Railways
- Skansen Parowozownia Kościerzyna, Kościerzyna, Pomeranian Voivodeship, – Railways
- Museum of city transport, Poznań
- Bydbus Zabytkowe Autobusy, Bydgoszcz, Woiwodschaft Kujawien-Pommern

== Portugal ==
- Carris Museum, Lisbon
- Museu Nacional Ferroviário, Entroncamento –
- Porto Tram Museum, Porto
- Museu dos Transportes e Comunicações, Porto
- Museu Nacional dos Coches, Lisboa

== Russia ==
- Central Railway Museum, Saint Petersburg
- Museum of Electrical Transport, Saint Petersburg (see in Russian)
- Moscow Metro Museum, Moscow
- Oktyabrskaya Railway Museum, Saint Petersburg
- Pereslavl Narrow Gauge Railway Museum, Pereslavl-Zalessky –
- Museum of Carriages and Autocars, Moscow
- Vadim Zadorozhny's Technical Museum, Moscow –
- Museum of Retro Cars, Moscow
- Museum of Urban Transport, Moscow – unofficial site
- Monino Air Force Museum, Moscow
- Museum of the Moscow Railway, Moscow

== Saudi Arabia ==
- Hejaz Railway Museum in Medina
- The Hejaz railway station at Mada'in Saleh

== Serbia ==
- Muzej Vazduhoplovstva, Belgrade
- Zeleznicki Muzej, Belgrade

== Singapore ==
- Land Transport Gallery, Singapore -

== Slovakia ==
- Museum of Transport, Bratislava –
- Museum of Aviation, Košice –
- Čierny Hron Railway heritage railway, Čierny Balog, Hronec et al.
- Historical Logging Switchback Railway heritage railway, Vychylovka
- Orava Logging Railway heritage railway, Oravská Lesná
- Railway Museum of Railway Depot "East", Bratislava
- Košice Children's Heritage Railway, Košice
- Museum of Transport, Rajecké Teplice
- Museum of Vintage Automobiles, Mlynica (defunct, moved)
- Exhibit of Vintage Automobiles, Kežmarok Museum, Kežmarok (moved from Mlynica)
- Classic Car Museum, Piešťany
- 1st Slovak Private Transport Museum in Prešov, Prešov-Šarišské Lúky (private collections, open on demand)
- Kysucké múzeum – Historical Logging Switchback Railway

== Slovenia ==
- Slovenian Railway Museum, Ljubljana

== South Africa ==
- James Hall Transport Museum, Johannesburg
- Franschhoek Motor Museum, Franschhoek -

== Spain ==
- Museo del Ferrocarril, Madrid
- Torre Loizaga, Biscay
- [./Https://es.wikipedia.org/wiki/Museo_EMT_Madrid Museo EMT Madrid] Madrid
- Museos del Metro, Madrid:
  - Pacífico Power Plant (Nave de motores Pacífico)
  - Chamberí station (closed station renewed as a museum)
  - Chamartín station display of rolling stock
  - Pacífico station vestibule

== Sweden ==
- Nynäshamns Järnvägsmuseum, Nynäshamn
- Nässjö Järnvägsmuseum, Nässjö
- Spårvägsmuseet, Stockholm
- Sveriges Järnvägsmuseum, Gävle
- Marcus Wallenberg-hallen (Scania)
- Bothnia Railway Museum, Luleå

== Switzerland ==
- Heritage Railway Blonay-Chamby, Blonay, Waadt; Heritage Railway including a museum
- Bahnmuseum Kerzers/Kallnach, Kerzers, FR und Kallnach, BE; Railways
- EUROVAPOR (Railway Society)
- Flieger Flab Museum, Dübendorf, ZH, – Aviation
- Swiss Museum of Transport, Lucerne; Large Museum exhibiting all forms of transport.
- Zürich Tram Museum, Zürich

== Taiwan ==
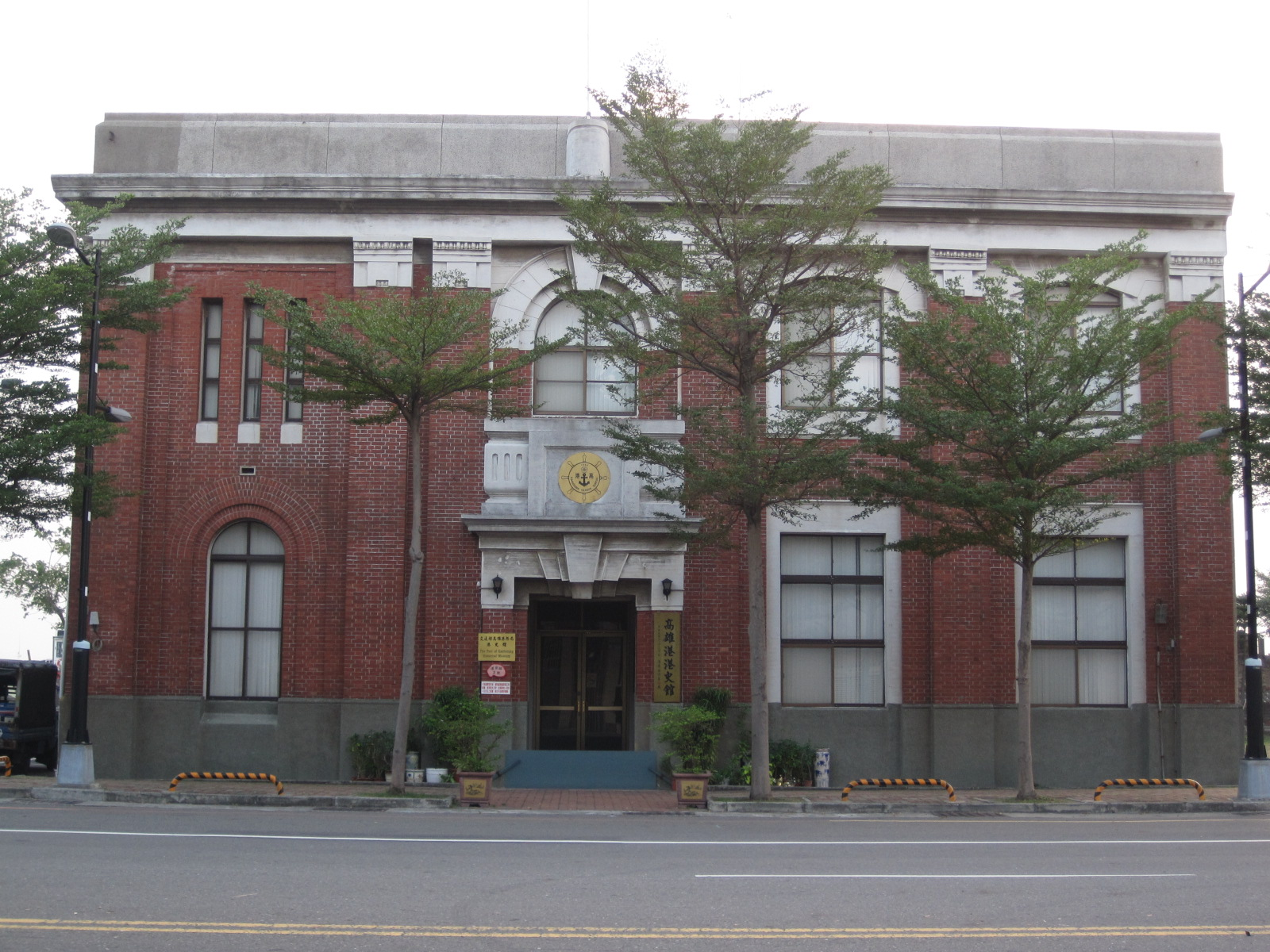
Kaohsiung Harbor Museum in Kaohsiung, Taiwan.

- Chung Cheng Aviation Museum, Taoyuan City
- Evergreen Maritime Museum, Taipei City
- Kaohsiung Harbor Museum, Kaohsiung City
- Miaoli Railway Museum, Miaoli County
- Takao Railway Museum, Kaohsiung City
- Tamkang University Maritime Museum, New Taipei City
- Taxi Museum, Yilan County
- Wulai Tram Museum, New Taipei City

== Turkey ==
- Rahmi M. Koç Museum, Istanbul
- Ural Ataman Classic Car Museum, Istanbul
- Key Museum, İzmir

== United Arab Emirates ==
- Emirates National Auto Museum, Abu Dhabi

== United Kingdom ==
=== England ===
- Amberley Museum & Heritage Centre, West Sussex – Motor buses, industrial narrow-gauge railways, road making
- Beamish Museum, Durham – Locomotives, trams, trolleys, motor buses
- Bentley Wildfowl and Motor Museum, Halland, East Sussex - Automobiles and motorcycles
- Black Country Living Museum, Dudley, West Midlands – trams and motor buses
- British Motor Museum, Gaydon, Warwickshire - Cars
- Brooklands, Weybridge, Surrey – Automobiles, aircraft
- Bury Transport Museum, Bury, Greater Manchester - Road vehicles, railway equipment, maps and signs
- C. M. Booth Collection of Historic Vehicles, Rolvenden, Kent - Pre-war automobiles and motorcycles
- Coventry Transport Museum, Coventry – Automobiles
- Cotswold Motoring Museum and Toy Collection, Bourton on the Water, Gloucestershire – Automobiles and nostalgia
- Dewsbury Bus Museum, West Yorkshire - Motor buses and coaches - Home of two Guy Wulfrunian buses
- Donington Grand Prix Collection, Leicestershire – Motor Racing Cars (closed in November 2018)
- East Anglia Transport Museum, Suffolk – Trams, Trolleys, Motor Buses
- Ensignbus transport museum, Essex – Motor Buses
- Fleet Air Arm Museum, Yeovilton, Somerset – Air Planes
- Greater Manchester's Museum of Transport, Manchester – Buses
- Haynes Motor Museum, Sparkford, Somerset – Automobiles, Motorcycles
- Heritage Motor Centre, Gaydon, Warwickshire – Automobiles
- Hopetown Carriage Works, Darlington, Durham
- Hovercraft Museum, Lee-on-the-Solent, Hampshire
- Imperial War Museum Duxford Airfield, near Cambridge – Civilian and Military Planes, Tanks
- Ingrow Railway Centre, Keighley, West Yorkshire – Steam Locomotives
- Ipswich Transport Museum – Trams, Trolleys, Motor Buses
- London Bus Museum, Weybridge - London buses
- London Canal Museum, London – Canal
- London Motor Museum, Hayes, Hillingdon - Custom and American automobiles
- London Motorcycle Museum – Motorcycles
- London Transport Museum, London – Rail Rolling Stock, Trams, Trolleys, Motor buses
- Midland Air Museum, near Coventry, Warwickshire. – Airplanes
- Museum of Transport in Manchester – Buses, (Trolleys), some train ephemera.
- National Maritime Museum, Greenwich and Falmouth – Maritime
- National Motor Museum, Beaulieu, Hampshire – Cars, Motorcycles
- National Motorcycle Museum, Solihull, West Midlands
- National Railway Museum, York – Locomotives, carriages, wagons and all related railway equipment
- National Tramway Museum, near Matlock, Derbyshire – Trams
- National Waterways Museum, Gloucester – Inland waterways collection
- Newark Air Museum, Nottinghamshire – Airplanes
- North West Museum of Road Transport, St Helens - Buses, Cars, Fire Engines, Trucks and Trams.
- North East Land, Sea and Air Museums, Sunderland - Aircraft, Trams, Buses, Fire Appliances and military vehicles.
- Nottingham Transport Heritage Centre, Nottinghamshire, – mainly railways, buses, cars
- Oxford Bus Museum, Long Hanborough – Buses
- Royal Air Force Museum, Hendon, London – Airplanes
- Royal Air Force Museum, Cosford, Shropshire – Airplanes
- Sammy Miller Motorcycle Museum, New Milton, Hampshire - Motorcycles
- Shildon Locomotion Museum, Durham – Locomotives, carriages, wagons and all related railway equipment
- Shuttleworth Collection, Old Warden, Bedfordshire – Pre-war automobiles, motorcycles and airplanes
- Solent Sky, Southampton, Hampshire – Aircraft
- Southampton Maritime Museum, Southampton, Hampshire – Maritime
- Streetlife Museum, Kingston upon Hull – Bicycles, carriages, cars, railway and Streetscene
- Swindon Steam Railway Museum – Railway
- The Transport Museum, Wythall, Worcestershire – Buses and electric cars
- Trolleybus Museum at Sandtoft, Lincolnshire – Trolleys
- Whitewebbs Museum of Transport, Enfield, London – Cars, trucks, fire engines, motorcycles, memorabilia, etc.
- Yorkshire Air Museum – Aircraft

=== Northern Ireland ===
- Ulster Folk and Transport Museum, Belfast – all kinds of transport

=== Scotland ===
- Glasgow Museum of Transport (closed in 2010)
- Museum of Flight, East Lothian Aerospace
- Riverside Museum, Glasgow (the city's new transport museum, opened in 2011)
- Grampian Transport Museum, Aberdeenshire
- Dundee Museum of Transport, Dundee
- Scottish Vintage Bus Museum, Lathalmond, Fife

=== Wales ===
- Pembrokeshire Motor Museum – cars
- Pendine Museum of Speed – cars
- Swansea Bus Museum - buses

== United States ==
=== Alabama ===
- Barber Vintage Motorsports Museum, Leeds, Alabama
- Heart of Dixie Railroad Museum, Calera, Alabama
- Huntsville Depot, Huntsville, Alabama
- North Alabama Railroad Museum, Huntsville, Alabama
- US Space & Rocket Center, Huntsville, Alabama

=== Alaska ===
- White Pass and Yukon Route from Skagway, Alaska to Whitehorse, Yukon

=== Arizona ===
- Arizona Street Railway Museum, Phoenix, Arizona
- Southern Arizona Transportation Museum, Tucson, Arizona

=== California ===
- Aerospace Museum of California, McClellan Air Force Base, northeast of Sacramento, California
- Cable Car Museum, San Francisco, California
- California Automobile Museum, Sacramento, California
- California State Railroad Museum, Sacramento, California (located in Old Sacramento)
- Golden Gate Railroad Museum, formerly San Francisco, California – relocated to Niles Canyon Railway in Sunol, California
- Hiller Aviation Museum, San Carlos, California
- Marin Museum of Bicycling, Fairfax, California
- Motor Transport Museum, Campo, California
- Oakland Aviation Museum, Oakland, California
- Pacific Bus Museum, Fremont, California
- Pacific Coast Air Museum, Santa Rosa, California
- Petersen Automotive Museum, Los Angeles, California
- San Diego Air & Space Museum, San Diego, California
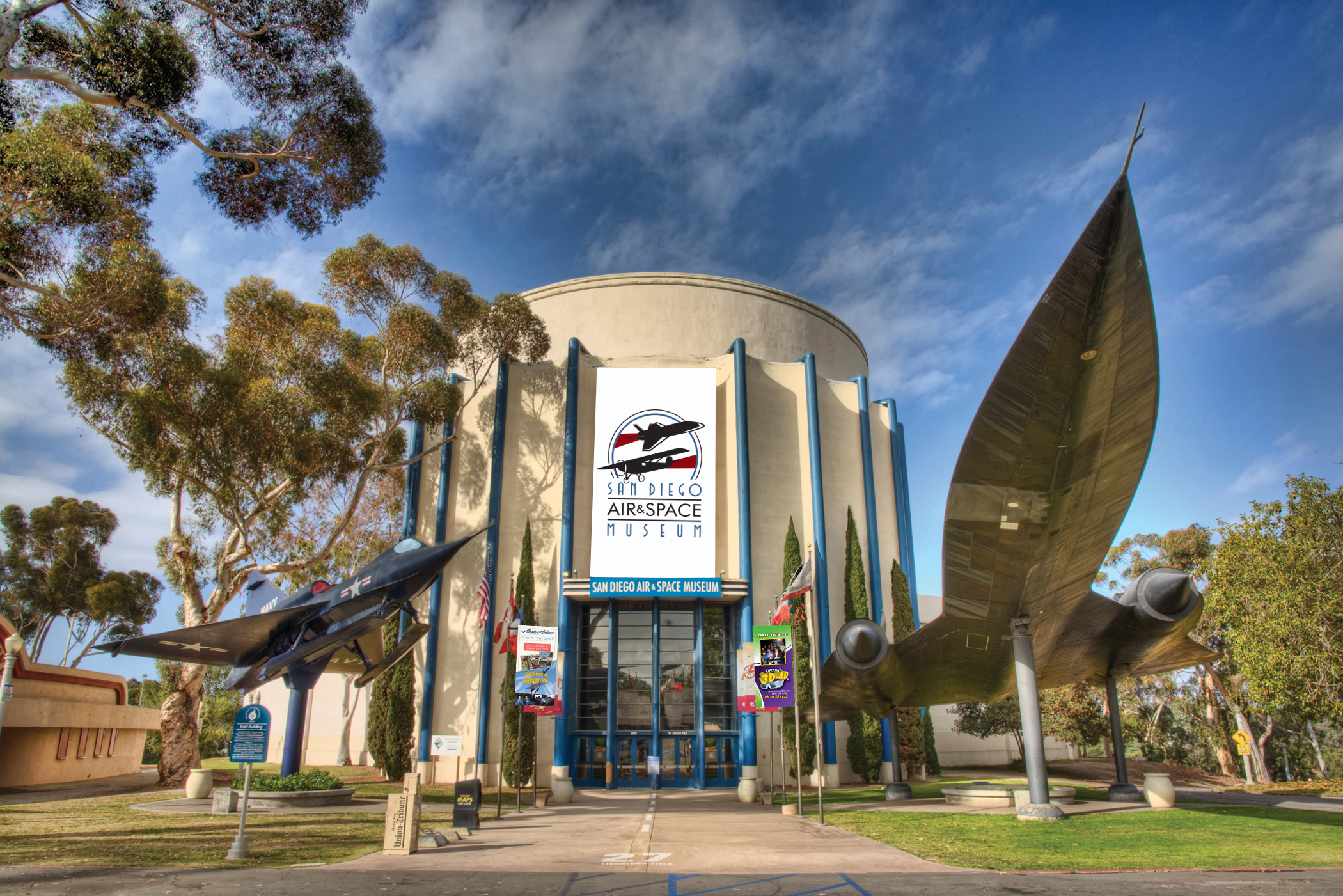
  San Diego Air & Space Museum
- San Diego Automotive Museum, San Diego, California
- San Diego Model Railroad Museum, San Diego, California
- San Francisco Maritime Museum, San Francisco, California
- San Francisco Railway Museum, San Francisco, California
- South Coast Railroad Museum, Goleta, California
- Southern California Railway Museum, Perris, California
- Travel Town Museum, Los Angeles, California
- Western Pacific Railroad Museum, Portola, California
- Western Railway Museum, Rio Vista, California

=== Colorado ===
- Colorado Railroad Museum, Golden, Colorado
- Durango and Silverton Narrow Gauge Railroad, Durango, Colorado
- Forney Transportation Museum, Denver, Colorado
- Golden Oldy Cyclery, The Sustainable Museum of Sustainable Transportation, Golden, Colorado, pre-1900 bicycles and tricycles & 21st century electric cars in a carbon negative museum.

=== Connecticut ===
- Connecticut Trolley Museum, East Windsor, Connecticut
- Shore Line Trolley Museum, East Haven, Connecticut

=== District of Columbia ===
- National Air and Space Museum (Smithsonian), Washington, D.C.

=== Florida ===
- Gold Coast Railroad Museum, Florida
- National Naval Aviation Museum, formerly known as the National Museum of Naval Aviation and the Naval Aviation Museum, Naval Air Station Pensacola, Florida.
- Tallahassee Automobile Museum, Tallahassee, Florida
- Tampa Bay Automobile Museum, Pinellas Park, Florida

=== Georgia ===
- Delta Heritage Museum, Atlanta, Georgia
- Southeastern Railway Museum, Atlanta, Georgia

=== Illinois ===
- Illinois Railway Museum, Union, Illinois
- Monticello Railway Museum, Monticello, Illinois
- Volo Museum, Volo, Illinois
- Wheels O' Time Museum, Medina Township, Peoria County, Illinois

=== Indiana ===
- Auburn Cord Duesenberg Museum, Auburn, Indiana
- Grissom Air Museum, Grissom Air Reserve Base, Peru, Indiana
- Indiana Aviation Museum, Valparaiso, Indiana
- Indiana Railway Museum, French Lick, Indiana
- Indiana Transportation Museum, Noblesville, Indiana

=== Kansas ===
- Carona Train Museum, Carona, Kansas
- Great Plains Transportation Museum, Wichita, Kansas
- Ottawa Northern Railroad, Baldwin City, Kansas

=== Kentucky ===
- Kentucky Railway Museum, New Haven, Kentucky
- National Corvette Museum, Bowling Green, Kentucky

=== Maine ===
- Owls Head Transportation Museum, Owls Head, Maine
- Seashore Trolley Museum, Kennebunkport, Maine

=== Maryland ===
- National Museum of Railroad History & Innovation, Baltimore, Maryland. Located at Mount Clare Station, the birthplace of American railroading.
- Baltimore Streetcar Museum, Baltimore, Maryland. Located on Falls Road on the old MD & PA right of way.
- Chesapeake and Ohio Canal National Historical Park from Georgetown, Washington, D.C. to Cumberland, Maryland
- National Capital Trolley Museum, Montgomery County, Maryland

=== Massachusetts ===
- American Heritage Museum, Stow, Massachusetts
- Edaville Railroad, South Carver, Massachusetts
- National Streetcar Museum, Lowell, Massachusetts
- Shelburne Falls Trolley Museum, Shelburne Falls, Massachusetts

=== Michigan ===
- Air Zoo, Portage, Michigan
- Automotive Hall of Fame, Dearborn, Michigan
- Ford Piquette Avenue Plant, Detroit, Michigan. Birthplace of the Ford Model T and the oldest car factory building on Earth open to the general public (built 1904).
- Gilmore Car Museum, Hickory Corners, Michigan
- Henry Ford Museum and Greenfield Village, Dearborn, Michigan
- R.E. Olds Transportation Museum, Lansing, Michigan
- Walter P. Chrysler Museum, Auburn Hills, Michigan
- Yankee Air Museum, Belleville, Michigan

=== Minnesota ===
- Bandana Square, Saint Paul, Minnesota, home of Twin Cities Model Railroad Club and old Northern Pacific Como shops.
- Minnesota Transportation Museum, Saint Paul, Minnesota

=== Missouri ===
- National Museum of Transportation, St. Louis, Missouri

=== Montana ===
- Montana Auto Museum, Deer Lodge, Montana

=== Nevada ===
- Nevada Northern Railway Museum, Ely, Nevada

=== New Hampshire ===
- Conway Scenic Railroad, North Conway, New Hampshire

=== New Mexico ===
- Anderson Abruzzo Albuquerque International Air Balloon Museum, Albuquerque, New Mexico

=== New York ===
- Brooklyn Trolley Museum, Brooklyn, New York
- Champlain Valley Transportation Museum, Plattsburgh, New York
- Glenn H. Curtiss Museum, Hammondsport, New York
- National Soaring Museum, Elmira, New York
- New York Museum of Transportation, Rush, New York
- New York Transit Museum, Brooklyn, New York
- Old Rhinebeck Aerodrome, Rhinebeck, New York
- Railroad Museum of the Niagara Frontier, North Tonawanda, New York
- Trolley Museum of New York, Kingston, New York

=== North Carolina ===
- North Carolina Transportation Museum, Spencer, North Carolina

=== Ohio ===
- National Museum of the United States Air Force, formerly the US Air Force Museum, in Dayton, Ohio
- Ohio Railway Museum, Worthington, Ohio

=== Oklahoma ===
- Oklahoma Railway Museum, Oklahoma City, Oklahoma
- Stafford Air & Space Museum, Weatherford, Oklahoma

=== Oregon ===
- Columbia River Maritime Museum, Astoria, Oregon
- Evergreen Aviation Museum, McMinnville, Oregon – Aviation,. Hughes H-4, Boeing B-17 und Supermarine Spitfire
- Oregon Electric Railway Museum, Brooks, Oregon
- Oregon Rail Heritage Center, Portland

=== Pennsylvania ===
- American Helicopter Museum and Education Center, West Chester, Pennsylvania
- Bicycle Heaven, Pittsburgh, Pennsylvania
- Electric City Trolley Museum, Scranton, Pennsylvania
- Museum of Bus Transportation, Hershey, Pennsylvania
- Pennsylvania Trolley Museum, Washington, Pennsylvania
- Railroad Museum of Pennsylvania
- Steamtown National Historic Site, Scranton, Pennsylvania

=== Rhode Island ===
- Herreshoff Marine Museum, Bristol, Rhode Island

=== South Carolina ===
- Transportation Museum of the World featuring the Miniature World of Trains, Greenville, South Carolina

=== Tennessee ===
- Memphis Railroad & Trolley Museum, Memphis, Tennessee
- Tennessee Central Railway Museum, Nashville, Tennessee
- Tennessee Valley Railroad Museum, Chattanooga, Tennessee

=== Texas ===
- National Aviation Education Center, Dallas, Texas
- Texas Museum of Automotive History, Dallas, Texas
- Texas Transportation Museum, San Antonio, Texas

=== Utah ===
- Golden Spike National Historic Site, Promontory Summit, Utah. Location of the completion of the First transcontinental railroad on May 10, 1869.

=== Virginia ===
- Commonwealth Coach & Trolley Museum, Roanoke, Virginia
- Mariners' Museum, Newport News, Virginia
- Norfolk Southern Museum, Norfolk, Virginia
- Steven F. Udvar-Hazy Center (Part of the Smithsonian National Air and Space Museum), Fairfax County, Virginia – Airplanes (Boeing B-29 Enola Gay) and Space Shuttle Enterprise
- Virginia Museum of Transportation, Roanoke, Virginia

=== Washington ===
- America's Car Museum, Tacoma, Washington
- Flying Heritage Collection, Everett, Washington
- Museum of Flight, Seattle, Washington
- Naval Undersea Museum, Keyport, Washington – U-Boote
- Northwest Railway Museum, Snoqualmie, Washington

=== Wisconsin ===
- East Troy Electric Railroad Museum, Wisconsin
- Harley-Davidson Museum, Milwaukee, Wisconsin
- National Railroad Museum, Green Bay, Wisconsin

=== Wyoming ===
- Wyoming Transportation Museum, Cheyenne, Wyoming

== Uzbekistan ==
- Tashkent Museum of Railway Techniques, Tashkent

== Vatican City ==
- Padiglione delle Carozze (Museo Storico, Vatican Museums)

== Venezuela ==
- Guillermo José Schael Transport Museum, Caracas, Venezuela

== See also ==
- List of aerospace museums
- List of automobile museums
- List of heritage railways
- List of museum ships
- List of railway museums
- List of British railway museums
