= Ducati Museum =

- Museo Ducati
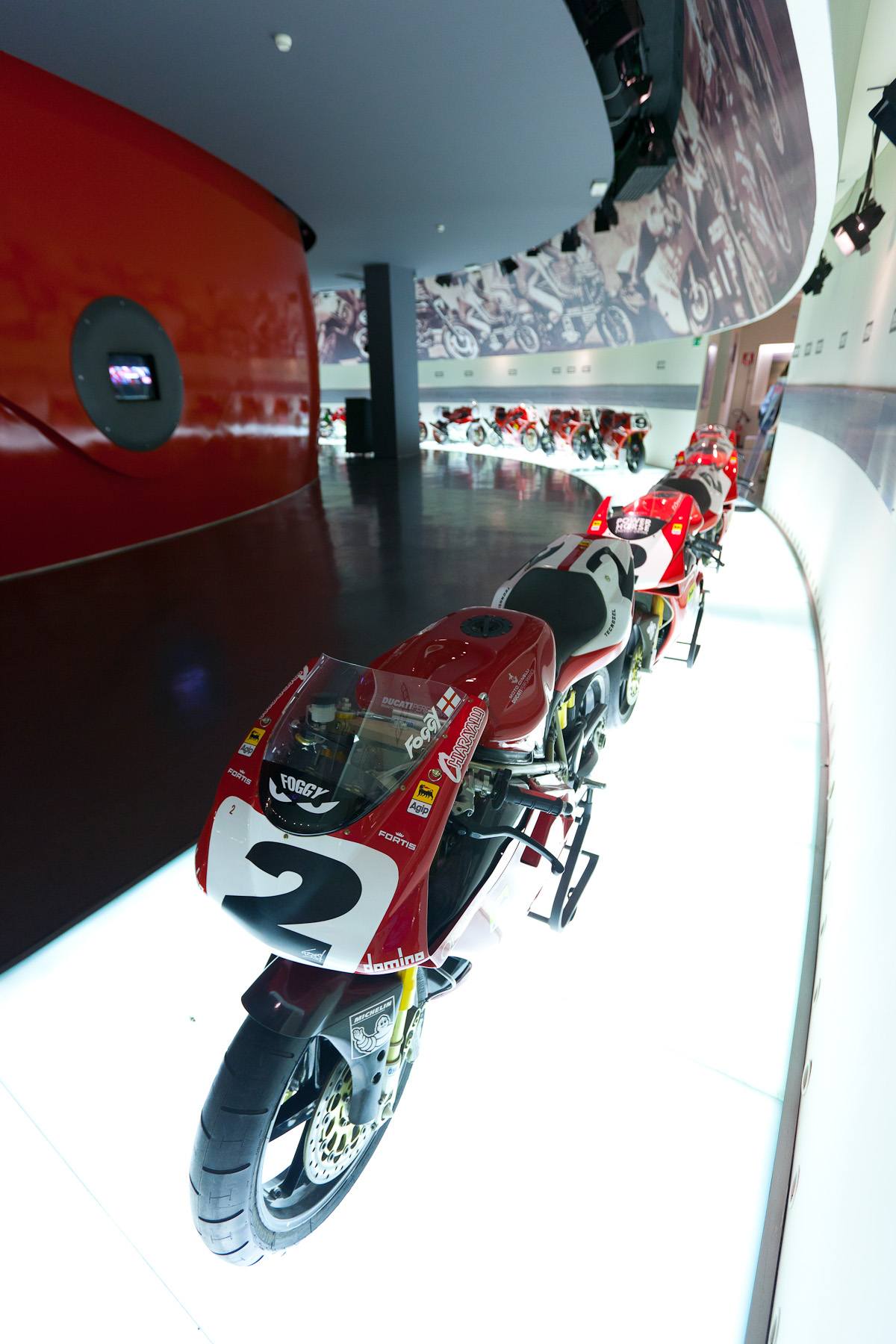
- Established: June 12, 1998
- Location: Bologna, Italy
- Coordinates: 44.516399°N 11.267574°E
- Type: Transport museum
- Collection size: 33 items, 3,000 square feet (280 m^{2})
- Curator: Livio Lodi
- Owner: Ducati
- Website: www.ducati.com/ww/en/heritage

The Ducati Museum (Italian: Museo Ducati) is a transport museum in Bologna, Italy at the Ducati factory.

== Summary ==
It has a collection of Ducati motorcycles and some early non-automotive products.

== Legacy ==
The museum's collection of technical documentation was selected by Italian Ministry of Cultural Heritage and Activities for inclusion in the national archive.
