= Dundee Museum of Transport =

Transport museum in Dundee, Scotland

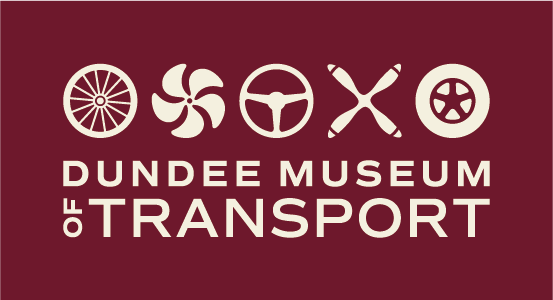

- Location of the Dundee Museum of Transport
- Established: 26 April 2014
- Location: Market Mews, Dundee, Scotland (DD1 3LA)
- Coordinates: 56.4665°N 2.9493°W
- Type: Transport museum
- Website: www.DMofT.co.uk

The Dundee Museum of Transport, located in Dundee, Scotland is a self-sustaining Scottish Charitable Organisation. The museum has a collection of historical items covering transport in Dundee and across Scotland.

As of 2026, the museum plans to renovate and move into the former Maryfield Tram Depot from its current site at Market Mews by 2027. This will allow space to display more objects and “provide a valuable history of Dundee”. The planned move would aim to provide the resources to conduct more educational workshops and community work.

== History ==
=== 2010–2014: Establishment ===
In February 2010, representatives from several local groups met intending to establish Dundee Museum of Transport (DMofT).

A committee was elected to advance the plans as quickly as possible, and on 2 June 2010 Dundee Museum of Transport was granted charitable status. Shortly after being formed DMofT acquired the lease on a derelict building that previously was part of an abattoir. Over the next four years a group of volunteers with little outside help or financial assistance, renovated the building and made it habitable.

=== 2014–2023: Opening of the museum and first decade ===
The Dundee Museum of Transport officially opened on 26 April 2014. in one main hall, and over the next two years Halls two, three and four were completed and opened.

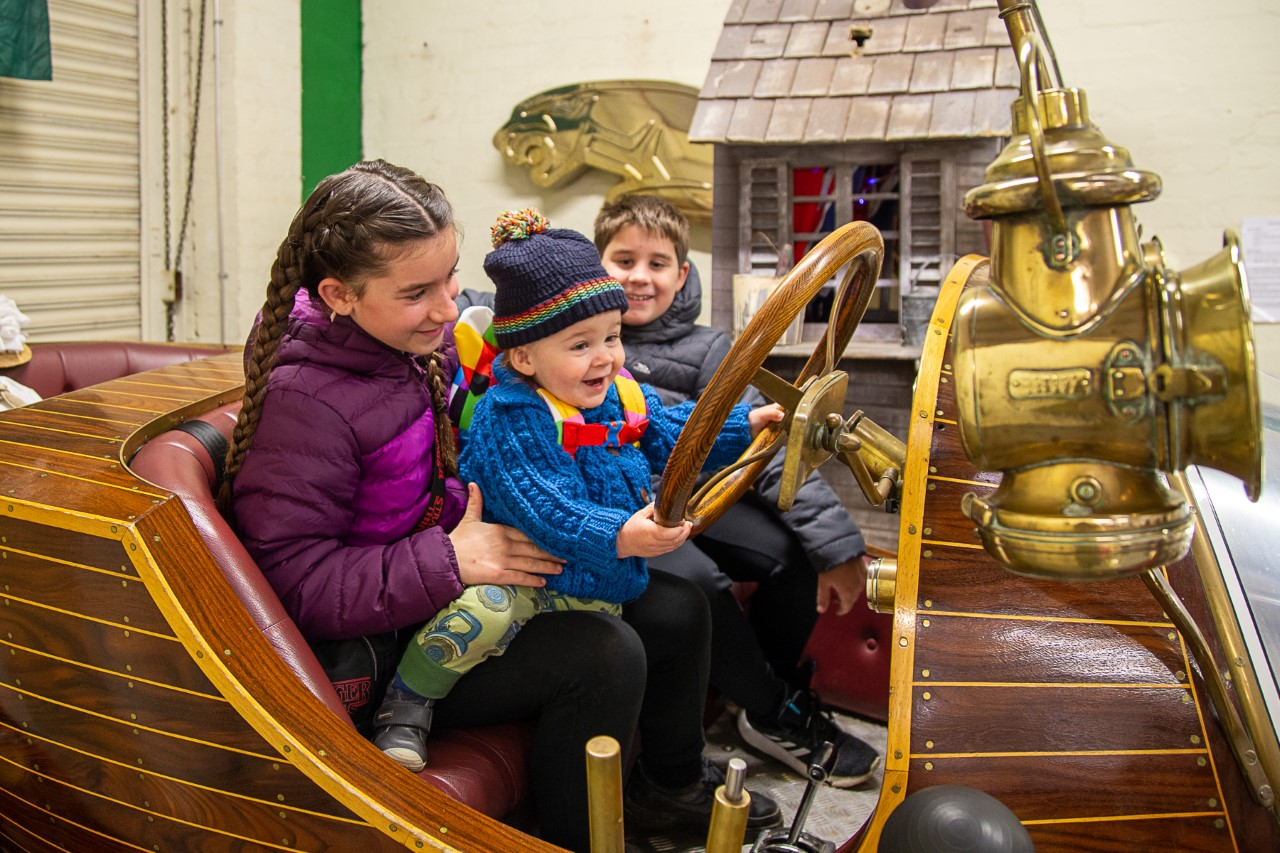
Children visiting the museum in 2022

Although the original intention was for the Market Mews site to be temporary, with a move slated for just a couple of years later, delays in acquiring and funding a permanent site pushed this back. As a result, the museum currently has a lease extension at Market Mews until 2026.

=== 2023–2026: Preparation for Maryfield and final years at Market Mews ===
In 2023, planning permission was granted for the Museum of Transport to redevelop the Maryfield Tram Depot site.

Following this, the museum launched the “Sponsor a Brick” initiative on crowdfunder which aimed to allow members of the public to sponsor a brick as part of the Maryfield Tram Depot to help fund the renovation of the site.

In 2024, the museum received £1.2 million in funding from the UK Government to further enhance the Museum of Transport’s move to the Maryfield Tram Depot. In June of that year, plans were submitted to Dundee City Council for the final design of the redeveloped Maryfield site.

In January 2026, the museum received £2.7 million in funding from the UK Government through Dundee’s Community Regeneration Partnership, this secured the funding for the restoration at Maryfield Tram Depot.

The museum is set to close the Market Mews site on 31 October 2026.

== Features ==
The museum offers four halls of artefacts from buses and trams used on local routes, motorbikes, pushbikes and cars from throughout the centuries and models of different ships and trains. There is also a gift shop and a café.

On the 23 October 2020, the museum opened its most recent temporary exhibition, The Future of Transport, which takes on a retro futuristic feel while discussing the impact of transport on climate change and how transport is changing to counteract this.

The museum is one of the eight organisations, out of 264 proposals from 48 countries, that exhibited at COP26 in November 2021.

=== Maryfield Tram Depot proposals ===
From inception, the original Trustees intended to acquire the Maryfield tram depot as the museum’s eventual home. With the aid of a grant from Dundee City Council’s Common Good fund, the Maryfield site was purchased in 2015.

At the Maryfield Tram Depot, the external ground and café will be open to the local community without admission to the museum. The development of the Maryfield premises will become part of the regeneration phase of the local area. Plans were approved on 18 April 2023.

The museum will also focus on sustainability and renewable energy. It is therefore planned that the new premises will have roof-mounted solar water heating panels to reduce energy demand, the museum is also planning for ground source heat pumps for the garden area. It will inform visitors about fossil-fuel-free transportation, which we have already started with, in The Future of Transport exhibition. There will also be a park and ride provided to other Dundee based visitor attractions to minimise the museum’s carbon footprint.

The current designs for the site were drawn up in 2019 and continued to be developed before being submitted to the council in 2024.

The former depot, built in 1901, has been out of use since 2005 and was owned by Scottish Water prior to being acquired by the museum.

== Gallery ==
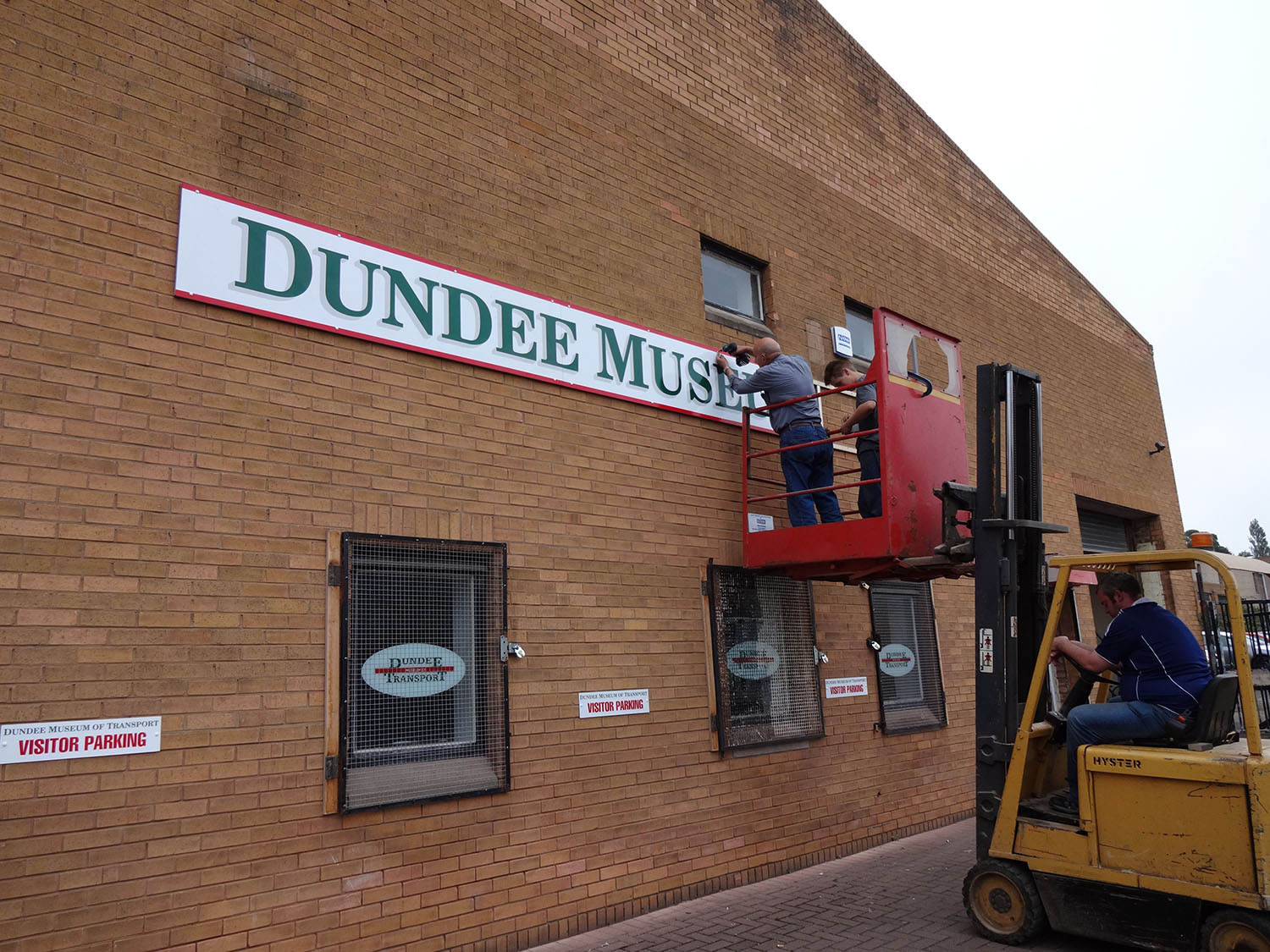
Installation of the first museum sign outside the home of the Dundee Museum of Transport

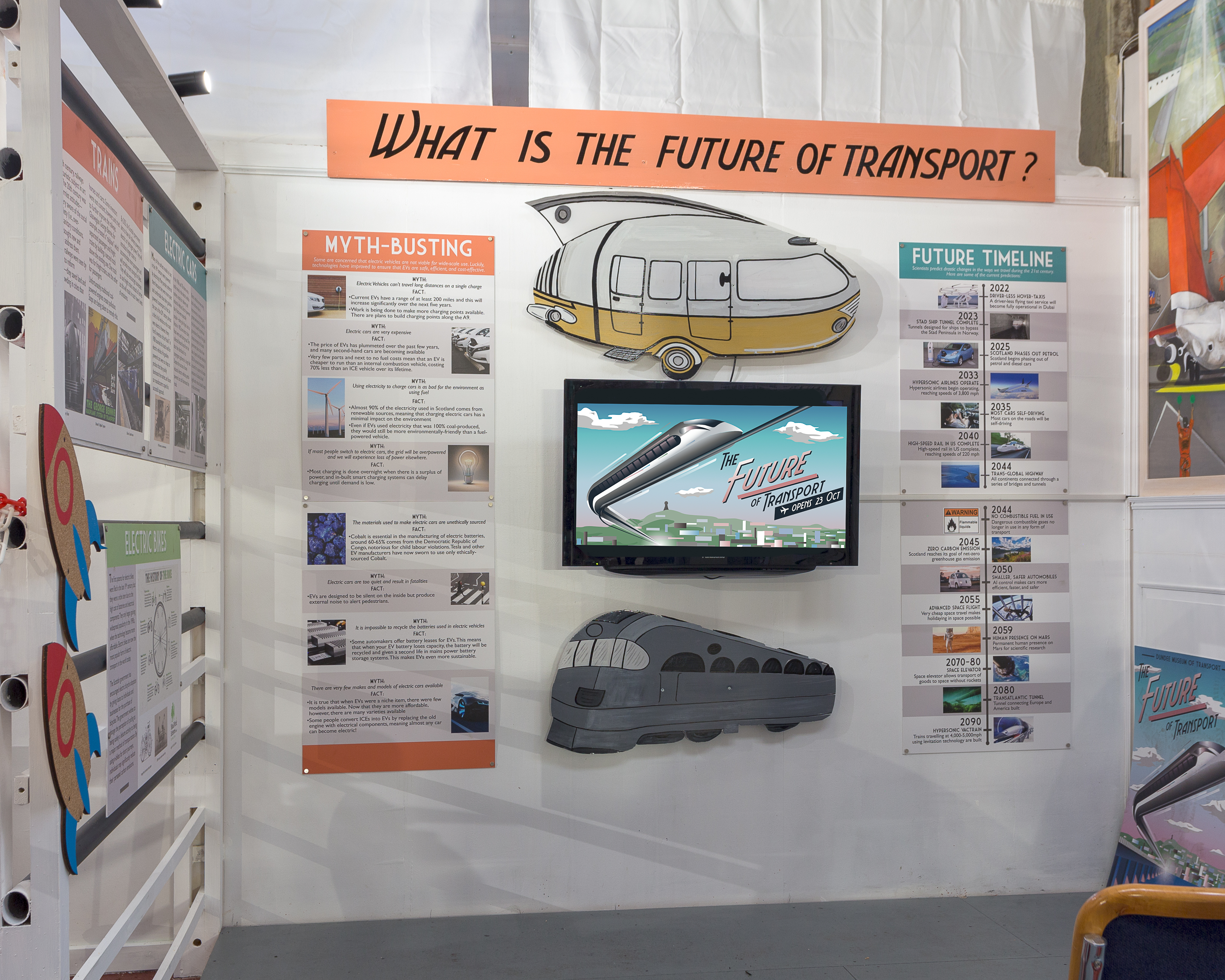
The Future of Transport exhibition at The Dundee Museum of Transport

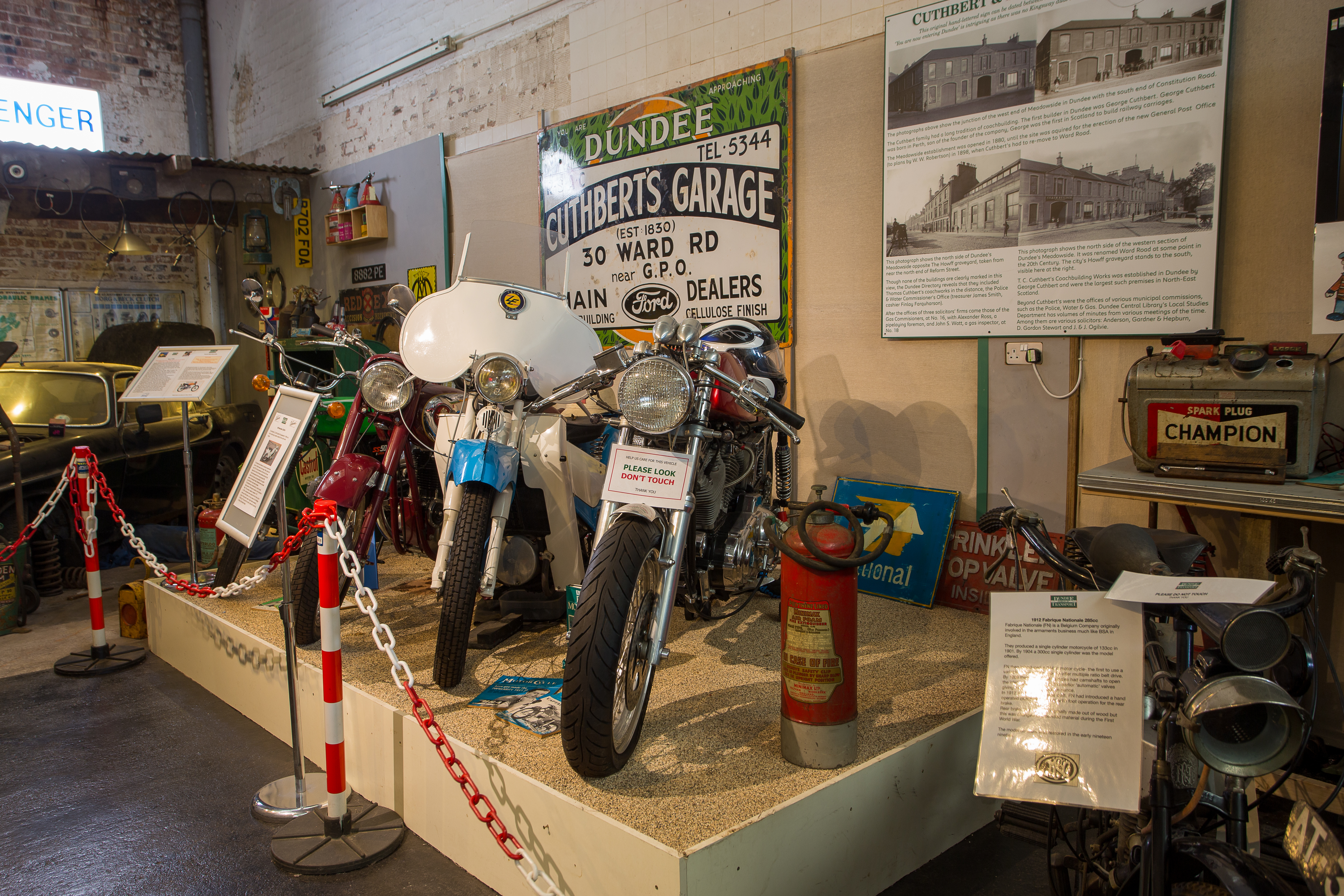
Motorbike display at the Dundee Museum of Transport

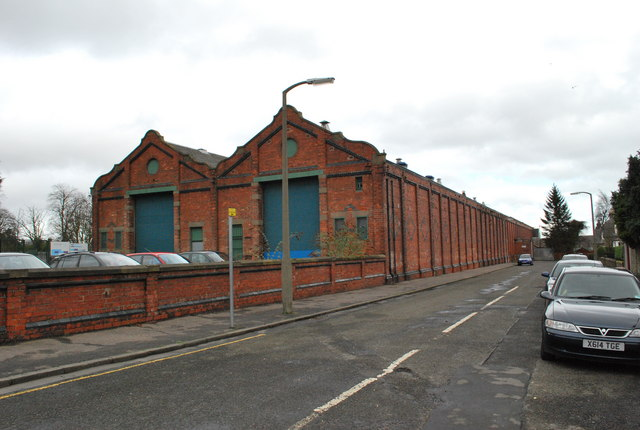
The proposed new home: Maryfield Tram Depot

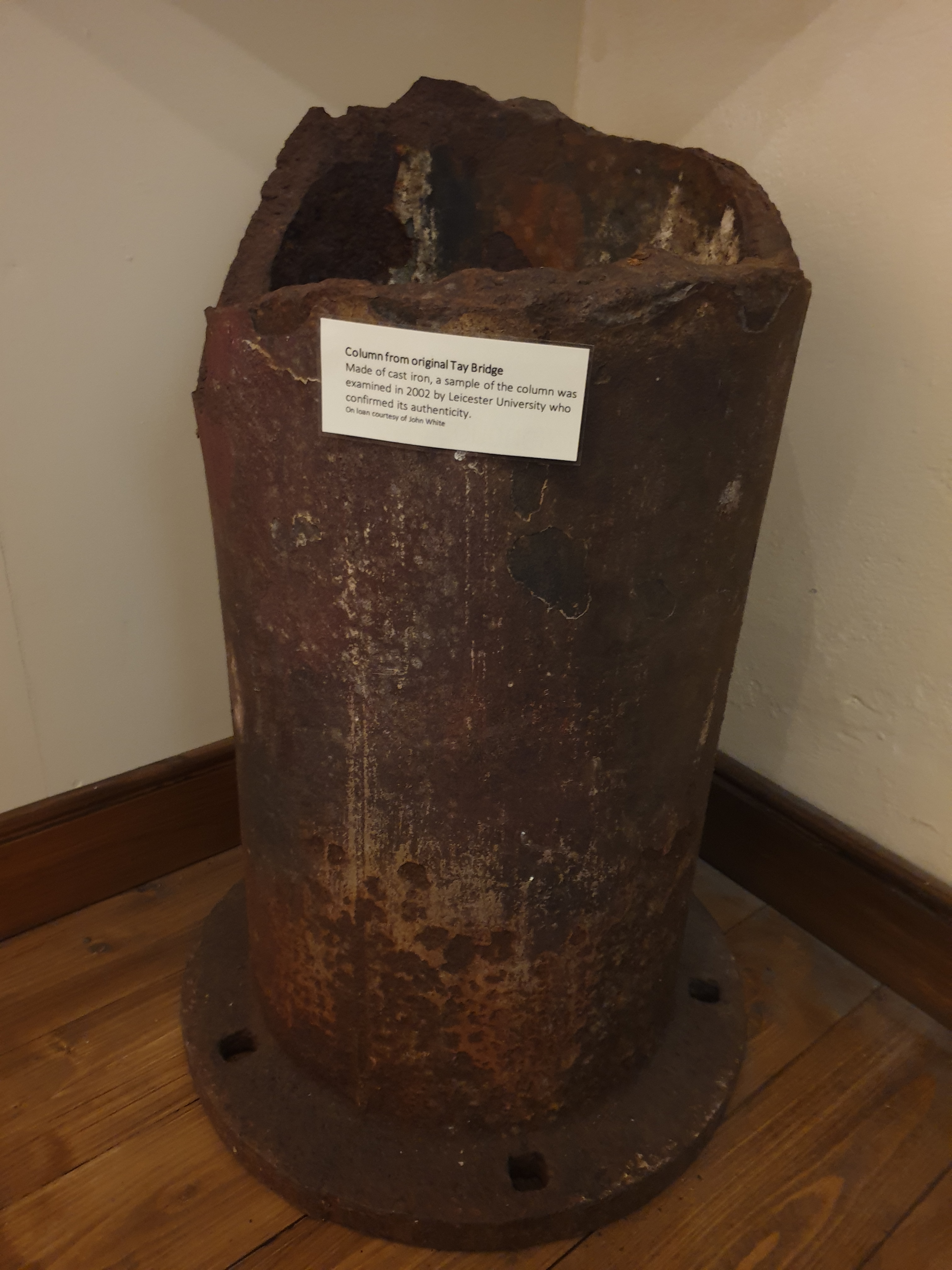
Column from the first Tay Bridge on display

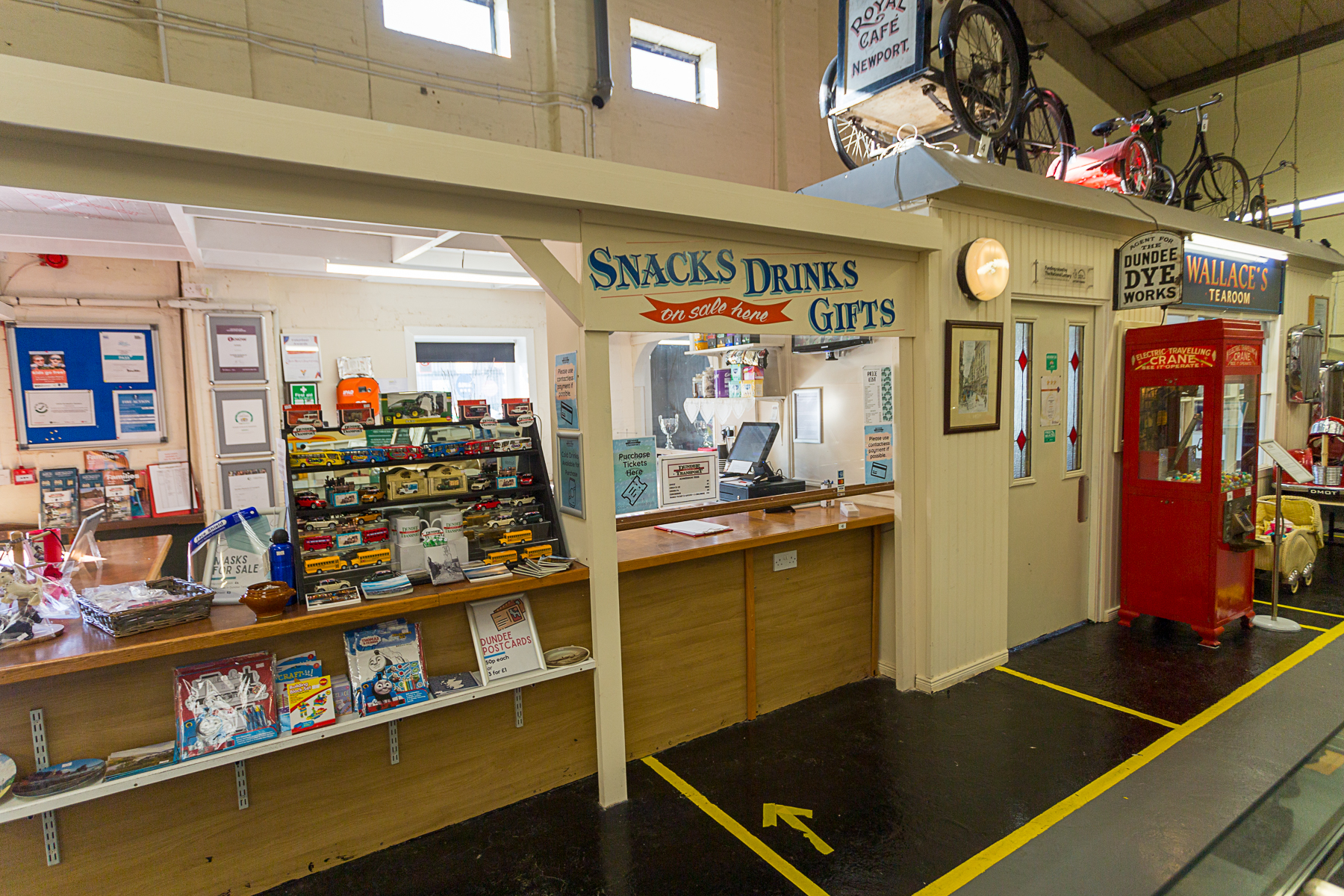
Cafe and gift shop area
