= Champlain Valley Transportation Museum =

Museum in Plattsburgh, New York, US

- Established: 2000; 26 years ago
- Location: 8 Museum Way, Plattsburgh, New York, USA
- Coordinates: 44.68355°N 73.44568°W
- Type: Transportation museum
- Website: Champlain Valley Transportation Museum

The Champlain Valley Transportation Museum is a transportation museum in Plattsburgh, New York, United States. Established in 2000 and opened to the public in 2004, the museum is located on the grounds of the former Plattsburgh Air Force Base. Its exhibits document the history of transportation in the Champlain Valley, including automobiles and transportation associated with Lake Champlain and the St. Lawrence Seaway.

Originally established to preserve the history of Lozier Motors, the museum has since expanded its collection to include historic automobiles and other transportation artifacts.

== History ==
The museum was the idea of Anthony Vaccaro, a Plattsburgh physician, who owned and restored a 1915 Lozier. He saw a museum dedicated to Lozier Motors as a way of promoting Plattsburgh's rich history. Despite the museum's expanded scope, the Lozier remains its centerpiece. The museum's Type 82 Lozier is the only known Type 82 in existence.

The museum officially opened on the site of the former Plattsburgh Air Force Base in 2004 with the help of a corps of volunteers. Its permanent collection includes two Lozier Automobiles. Also housed at the museum are the Bill Gates Diner (a cafe housed in a trolley car), a 1924 REO Speed Wagon used by Plattsburgh Motor Services' founder Walter Church, a 1929 Model A Ford and a 1967 Jaguar.

- 1903 Oldsmobile (Reproduction)
- 1910 National Speedster
- 1911 Kissell Kar Speedster
- 1914 Lozier 5 Passenger Touring
- 1915 Lozier 7 Passenger Touring
- 1915 Ford Model T Roadster
- 1917 Ford Model T Race Car
- 1918 Dodge Limousine
- 1923 Dodge 5 Passenger Touring
- 1924 REO Truck
- 1925 Ford Model T Bobtail Racer
- 1927 Pierce Arrow Sedan
- 1929 Ford Model A Touring Right Hand Drive
- 1930 Ford Model AA w/Compressor
- 1930 Ford Huckster Truck
- 1930 Ford 5 Window Coupe
- 1934 Dodge Fire Truck
- 1940 DeSoto Taxi
- 1942 Willys Jeep
- 1947 Crosley Coupe
- 1948 Plymouth Coupe (Fire Chief's Car)
- 1948 Dodge Convertible
- 1949 Dodge Sedan
- 1949 Riley LeMans Roadster (Country of origin: UK)
- 1953 Triumph Renown Saloon (Country of origin: UK)
- 1956 Buick Century
- 1957 Ford Skyliner
- 1960 BMW Isetta
- 1960 Cadillac Deville Hardtop
- 1965 Ford Mustang Convertible
- 1967 Jaguar XK-E Roadster (Country of origin: UK)
- 1969 Pontiac Trans-Am
- 1970 Pontiac Trans-Am
- 1981 Home-Built Electric Towncar

Following a 2006 grant that helped establish the museum, in 2007, the museum received a $1 million grant from the New York State Department of Transportation to assist in the upgrade of the museum's infrastructure. The museum is required to raise $200,000 in order to receive the grant and in January 2008 it began a capital campaign to achieve this goal.
