= State Archives of Rome =

State archival institution in Rome, Italy

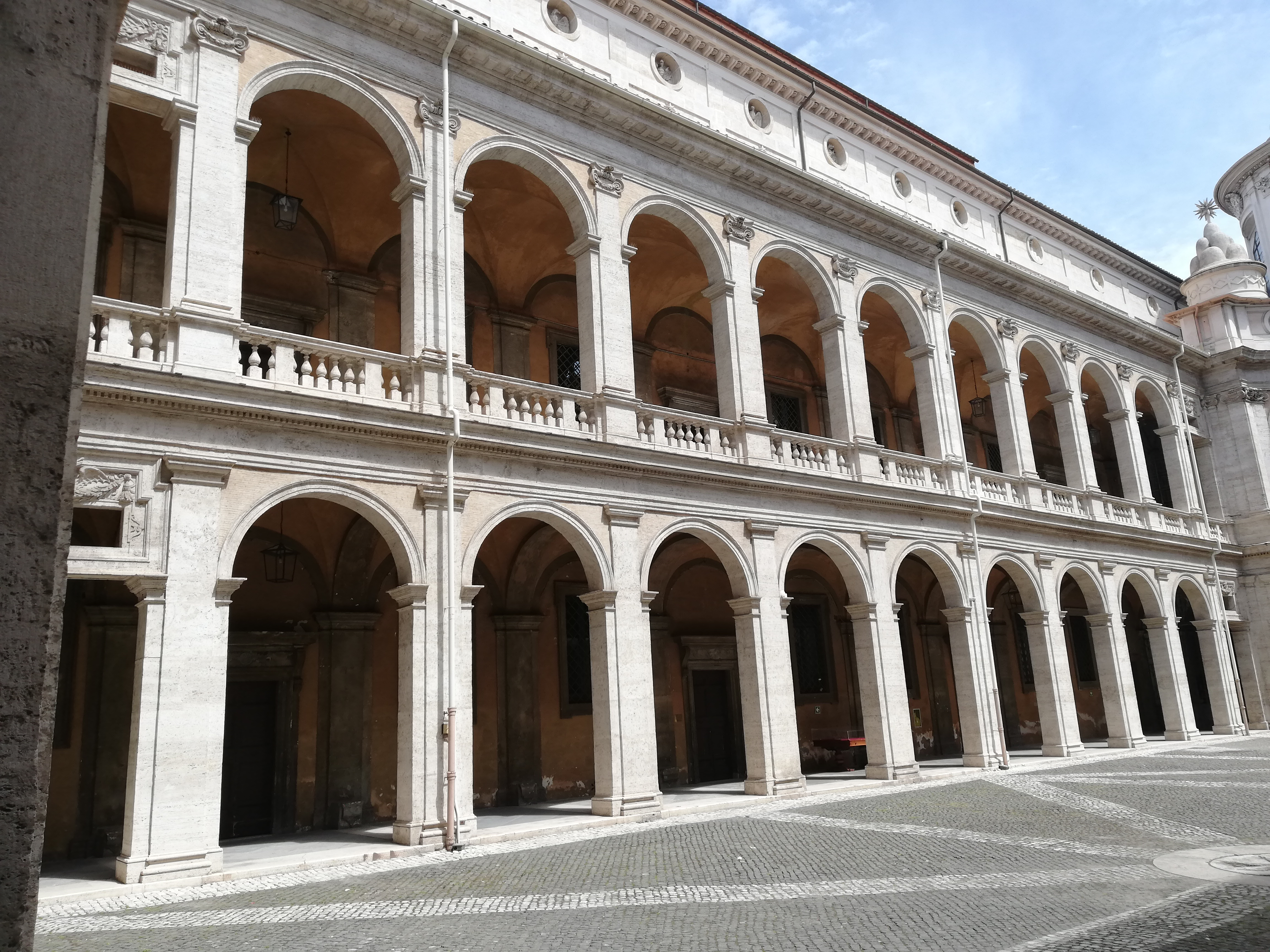
- Courtyard of the Palazzo della Sapienza
- Interactive map of State Archives of Rome
- 41°53′54″N 12°28′26″E
- Location: Rome, Lazio, Italy
- Type: State archive
- Established: 30 December 1871

Building information
- Building: Palazzo della Sapienza
- Website: https://archiviodistatoroma.cultura.gov.it/

The State Archives of Rome (Italian: Archivio di Stato di Roma) is a state archive located in Rome, Italy. The main headquarters are housed in the historic Palazzo della Sapienza on Corso del Rinascimento in the Sant'Eustachio rione, while a secondary facility is located in Via di Galla Placidia in the Collatino neighbourhood.

Established by royal decree on 30 December 1871 after the unification of Italy, the archive preserves records of the central administrative organs of the former Papal States, judicial and notarial archives of Rome, and documentation produced by state offices operating in the province of Rome before and after Italian unification. Its holdings include important archival fonds such as those of the Apostolic Camera and various papal tribunals, as well as records from religious corporations suppressed in the 19th century.

Since 1953, documentation produced by the central ministries of the Italian state has been preserved separately at the Central Archives of the State.

== Sources ==
- Quesada, Maria Antonietta; Salvatori, Luisa (eds.). Archivio di Stato di Roma. Viterbo: BetaGamma, 2009.
- Adorni, Giuliana. “L'archivio dello Studium Urbis fra Archivio di Stato di Roma e Archivio Segreto Vaticano.” Annali di Storia delle università italiane, 1 (2018), pp. 243–260.
