= Rotterdam Public Transport Museum =

- Rotterdams Openbaar Vervoer Museum
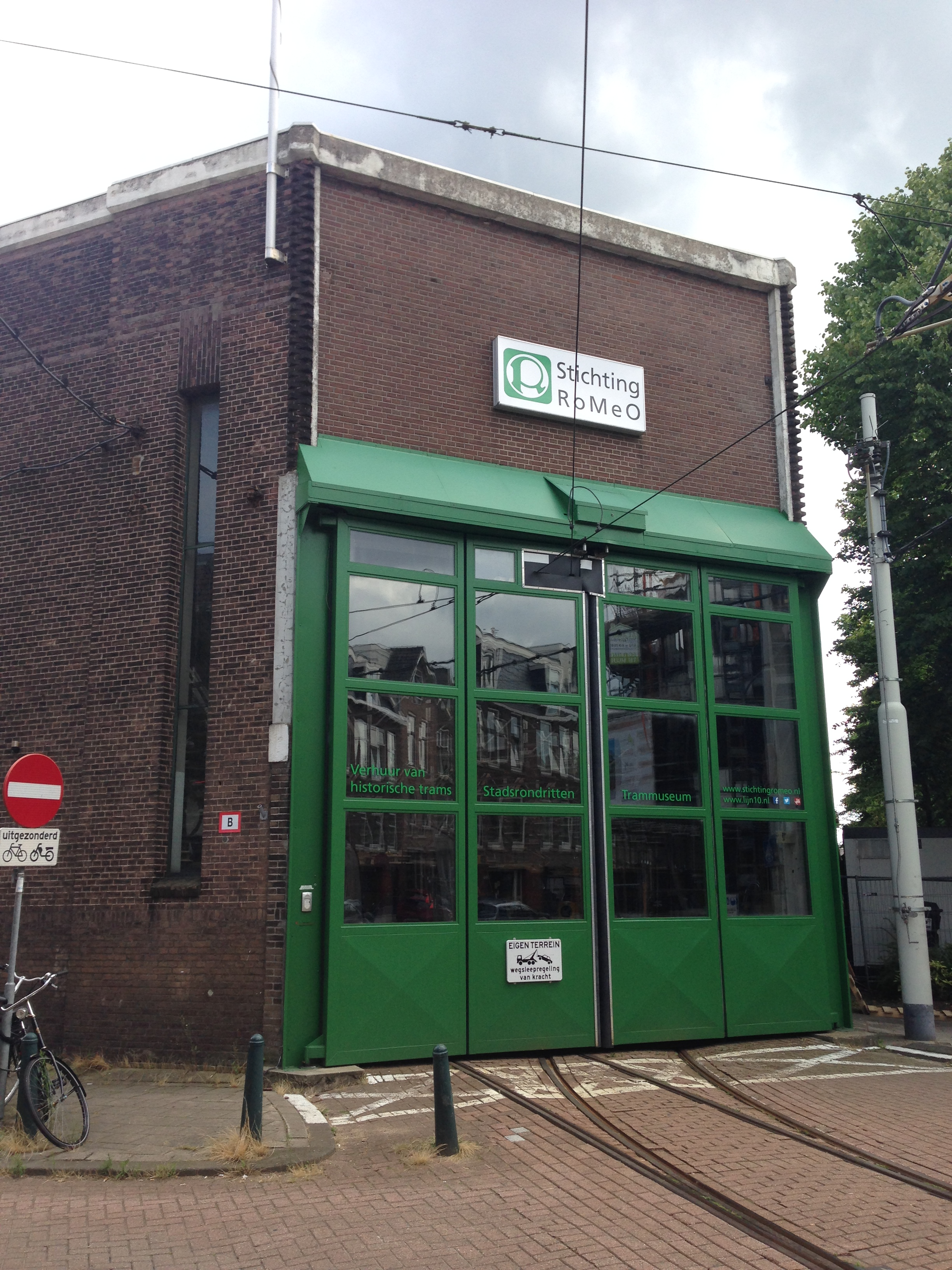
- Entrance to the depot
- Established: 1997
- Location: Kootsekade 19; Rotterdam, Netherlands
- Coordinates: 51.9449°N 4.4848°E
- Type: Transport museum
- Website: www.rovm.nl/en/

The Rotterdam Public Transport Museum (Dutch: Rotterdams Openbaar Vervoer Museum) is a transport museum in the Dutch city of Rotterdam and is located in a former tram depot. The museum was founded in 1997, although the depot was built in 1923 and its collection dates back to as far as 1880. The museum's collection consists of dozens of historic trams, several buses and two metro trains. The museum is run entirely by volunteers and is only open to visitors for a few days each year.

== Collection ==
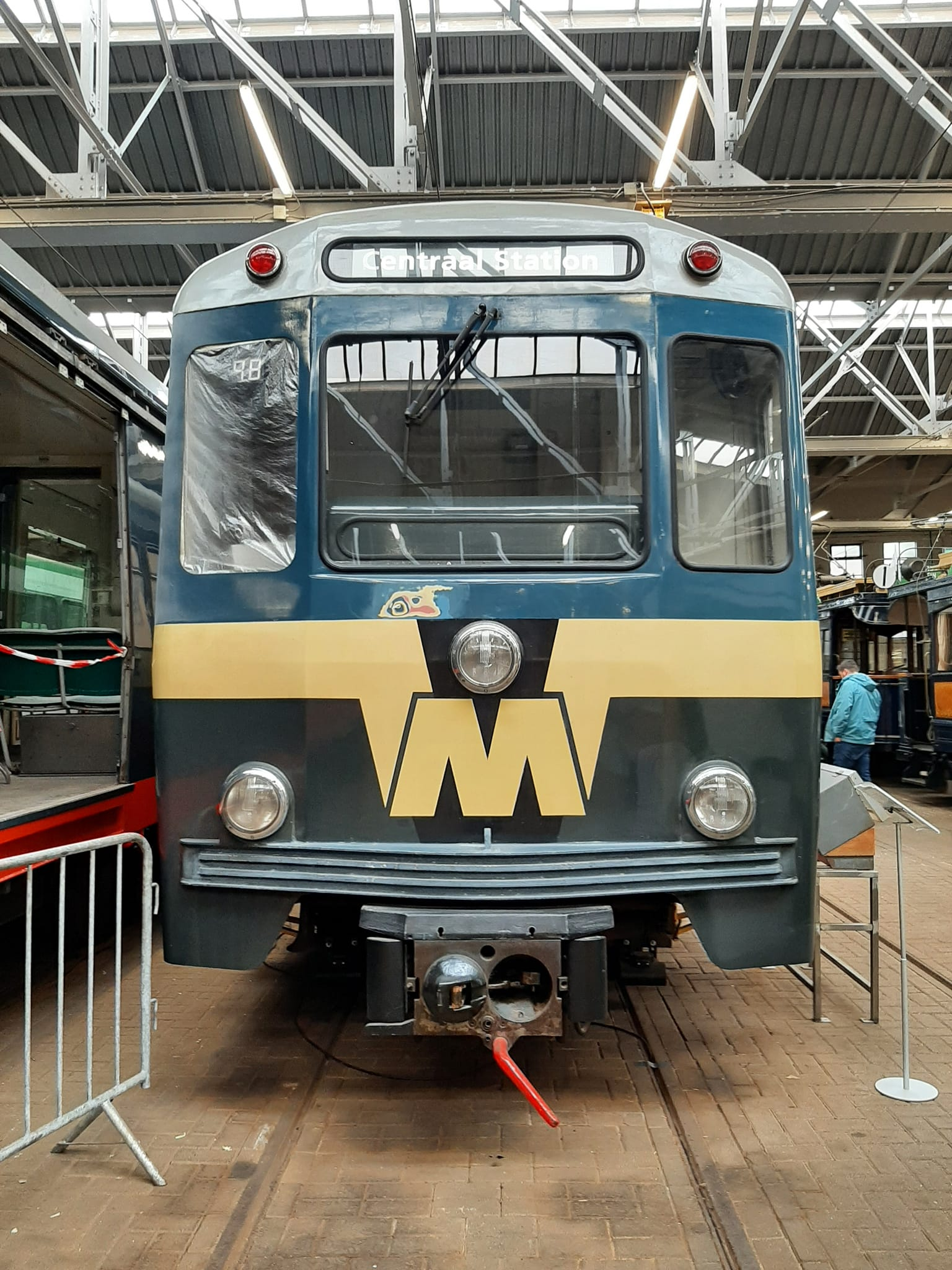
One of the first metro carriages in Rotterdam is part of the collection.

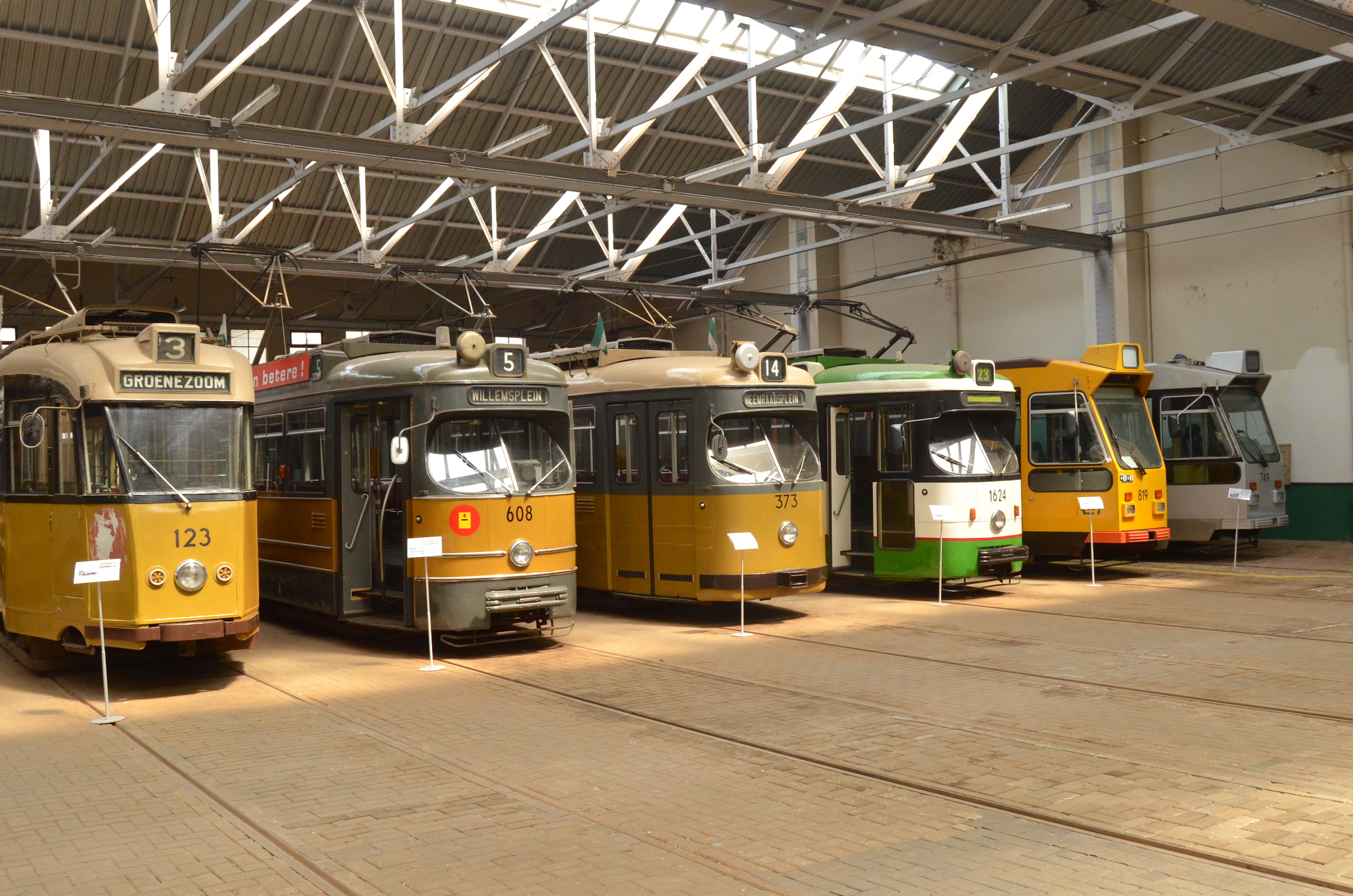
Part of the tram collection.

There are approximately 50 historical Rotterdam trams in total, varying in the year of construction between 1905 and 1986, including the two-axle trams, four-axle trams, allan trams, schindlers trams, Düwag trams and ZGT-carriages. Some of these have the status of museum trams, others have a function for group transport, instruction vehicles or work vehicles. The museum also owns two metro carriages (type M and type T). These are only used as museum objects and can no longer be used on the metro network. The Rotterdam Public Transport Museum also owns several buses from various public transport companies.

In addition to (rail) vehicles, the museum also has a collection of historical photos, tickets, caps, wire cutters, signs, posters, money changers and everything else that has to do with historical public transport in Rotterdam. Various merchandise such as postcards, refrigerator magnets and books are for sale in the museum shop.

== Activities ==
The museum is run entirely by more than 150 volunteers who keep the museum running through various activities.

=== Maintenance ===
One of the tasks of the Rotterdam Public Transport Museum is to manage and maintain all of the RET's historical rolling stock. This mainly concerns restoration and keeping the rolling stock running. The depot on the Kootsekade is where work is done on the trams and metros. The depot on the Sluisjesdijk is where the maintenance of the historical buses takes place. The work is done by volunteers. The costs for maintenance are financed from municipal subsidies, donations, rental trips and entrance fees.

=== City Tour Line 10 ===
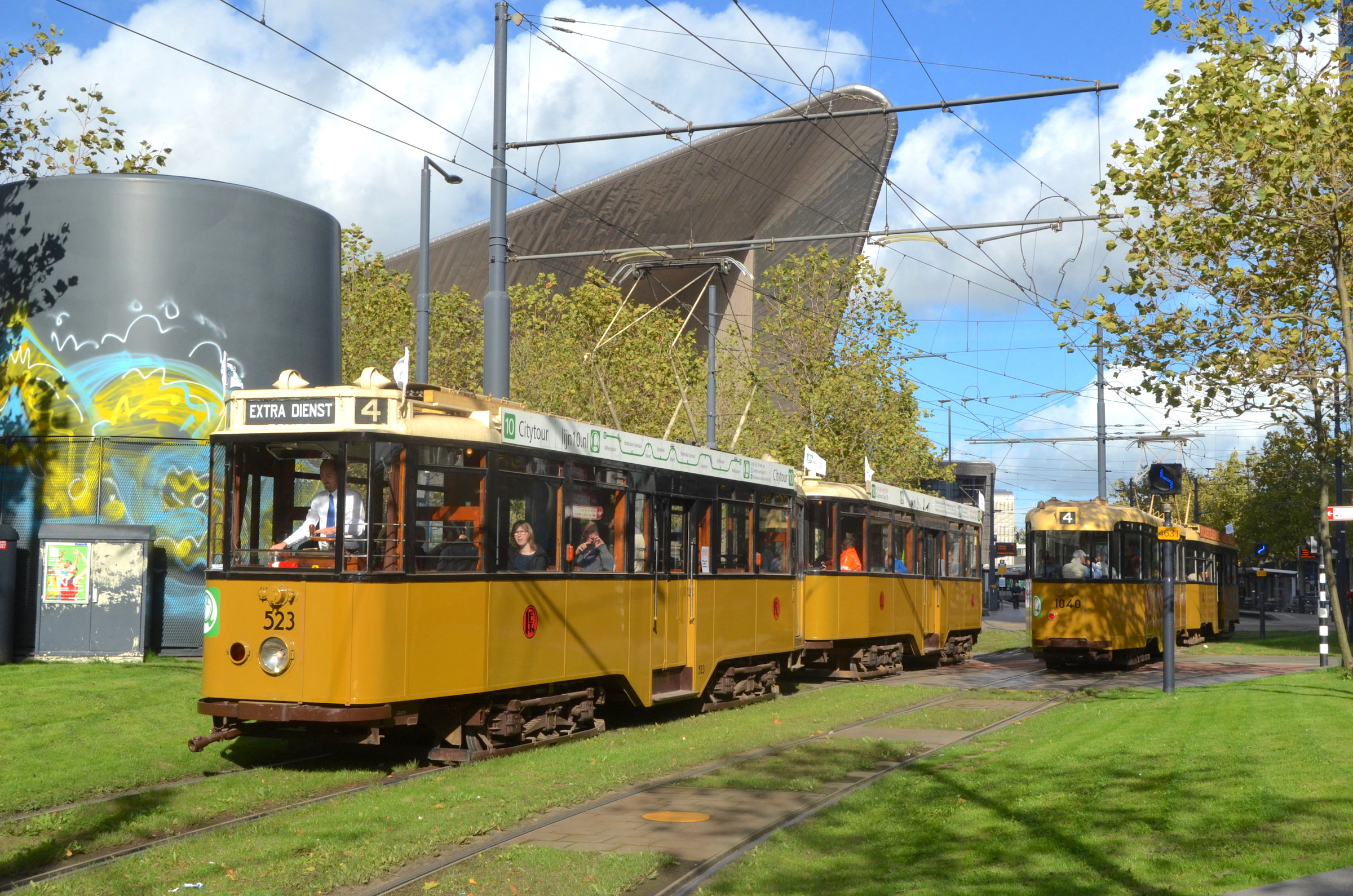
Historic trams in the city centre of Rotterdam.

In spring and summer and part of autumn, the historic trams run through the city centre of Rotterdam on weekends, and sometimes on Thursdays and Fridays, under the name Citytour Line 10. The trams run a fixed route through the city centre and Delfshaven, with Willemsplein as their fixed starting and ending point. Tourists can ride along for a fee and receive information about the various sights they pass along the way like the Euromast and Cube house. Line 10 works according to the 'Hop-On Hop-Off principle' that can be found in many cities worldwide. However, line 10 uses historic trams instead of modern buses.

=== Rental ===
Outside the museum days, companies, organisations, individuals etc. can rent historical trams and buses for a tour. Also (a part of) the museum can be rented for an event. The proceeds are used for the management and maintenance of the collection.

=== Cooperation RET ===
The Rotterdam Public Transport Museum works together with the RET where necessary. For example, the historic trams are used to tow away modern trams after a derailment or traffic accident. The museum's trams are also used to clear the tram track of snow and spread salt.
