= NZH Public Transport Museum =

Coordinates: 52°22′10″N 4°36′58″E

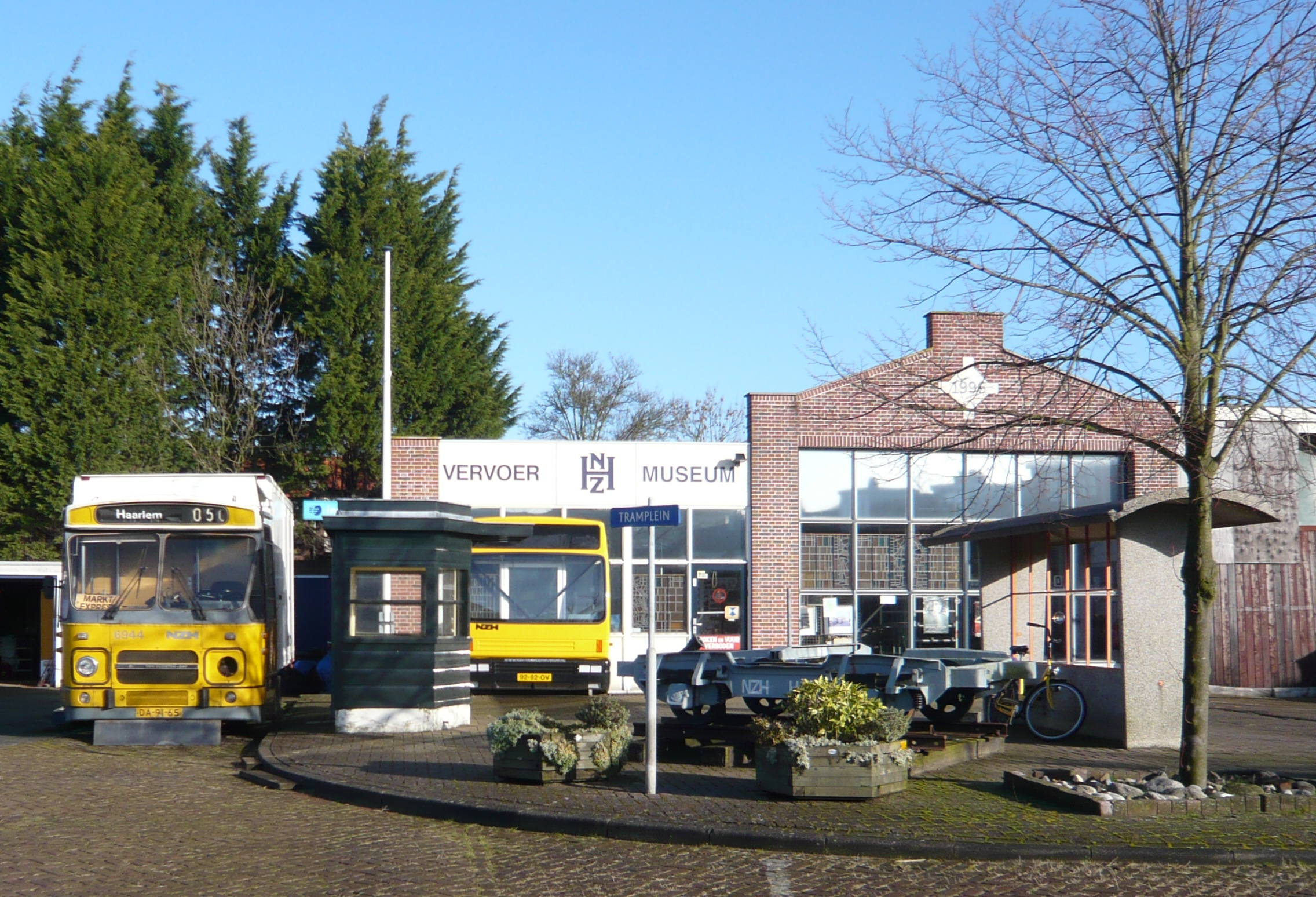
NZH Vervoer Museum in Haarlem

The NZH Public Transport Museum (Dutch: NZH Vervoer Museum) is a museum in Haarlem, Netherlands, dedicated to promoting interest and conserving the bus and tram cultural heritage of Kennemerland. It is located behind the former bus depot of the "Noord-Zuid-Hollandsche Stoomtramweg-Maatschappij" (NZH), a bus and tram company.

== History ==
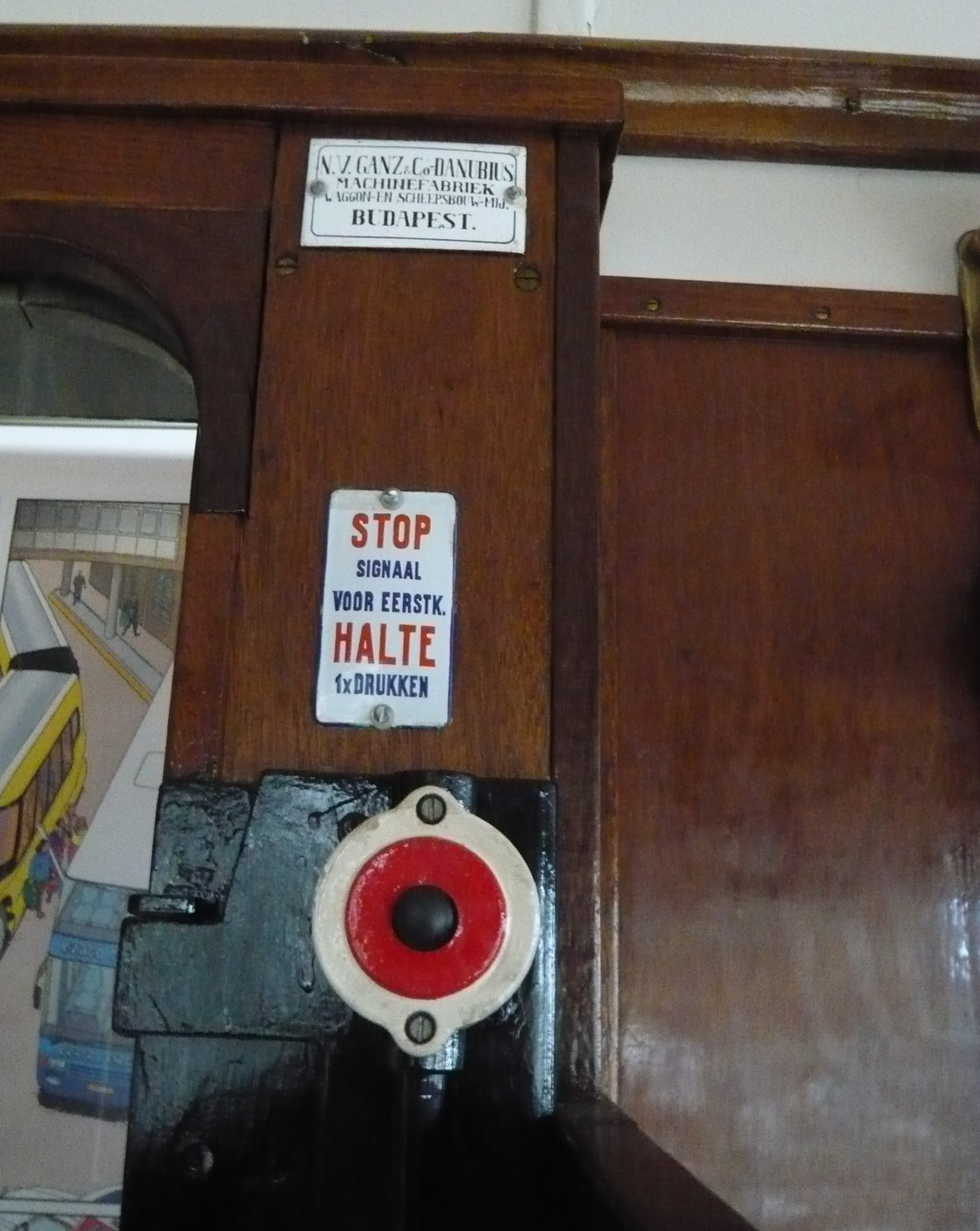
Stop button for passengers in the restored B412. Above the button, the manufacturer's logo can be seen: Ganz & Co. Danubius

The museum was opened in 1996 and aims to conserve the cultural heritage of the old tramway lines in the region, located on the historic tram depot of the Eerste Nederlandsche Electrische Tram-Maatschappij, built in 1899, which later in 1904 became the tram depot of the Electrische Spoorweg-Maatschappij (ESM), and still later the bus depot of the NZH. The tram line Amsterdam – Haarlem – Zandvoort ran until August 31, 1957, when trams were replaced by buses. The bus depot closed in 2006, but the museum is located on a small piece of land still owned by the NZH at the back.

=== A327 ===
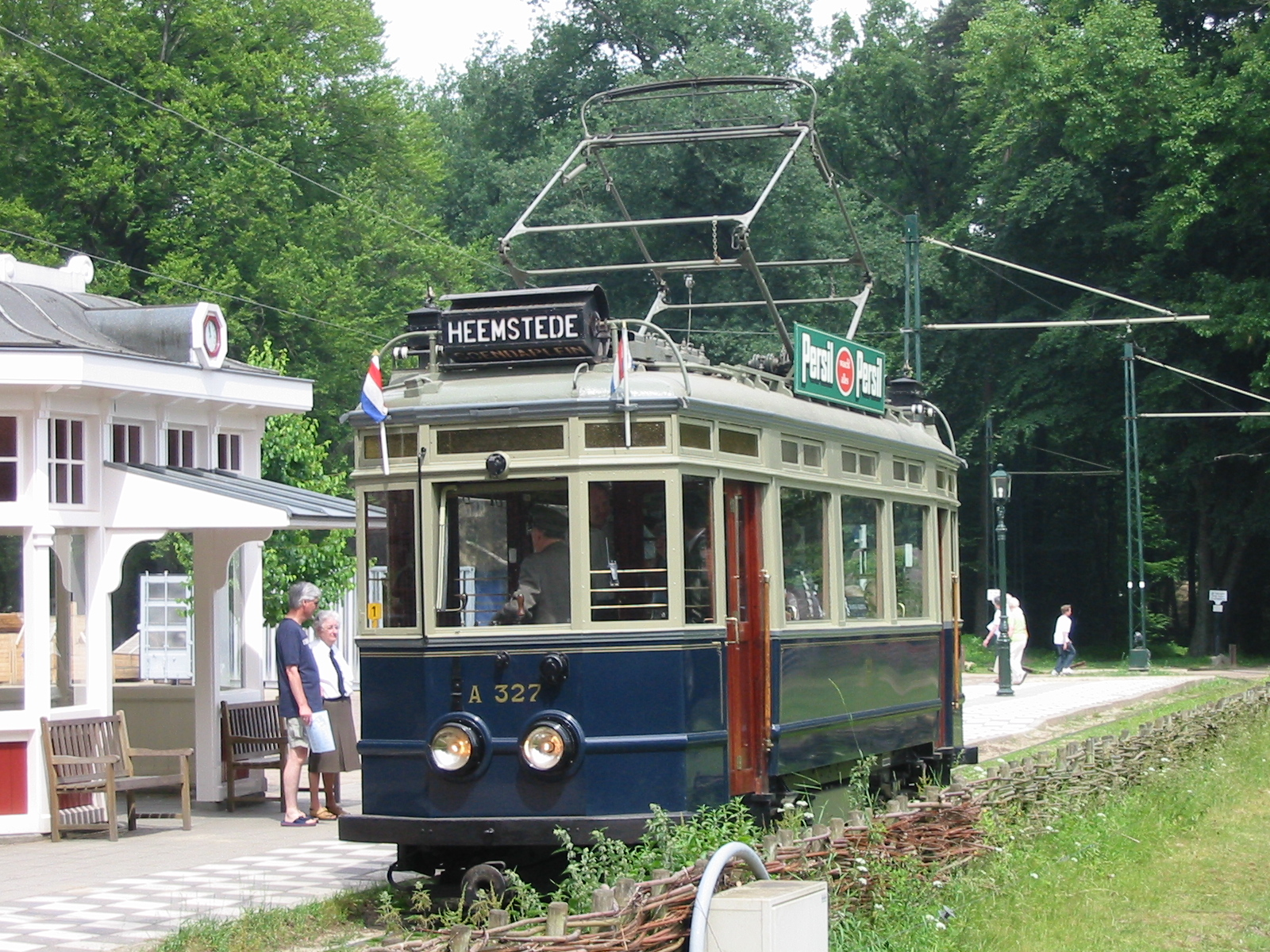
Tram A327 in action in the Netherlands Open Air Museum

The most famous "Blue Tram" is the A327, owned by the Tramweg-Stichting. The tram was built in 1913 by the Haarlem carriage factory Beijnes in Haarlem. It was in use until 1948 in Haarlem and after that until 1960 in Leiden. Together with the tram B26, in 1961 it was almost scrapped like many others before them, but was saved by the historical society NVBS. In 1965 it was handed over to the newly formed Tramweg-Stichting, who restored it. Since 1981 it is a working museum tram.

The museum is kept open by a large group of volunteers who actively work on the collection. Contact information is available on the website.

The museum is open Mondays and Thursdays from 9-12, and Saturdays from 11:00 to 16:00. Admission is free. There are restrooms and parking is available in front of the museum at the former bus depot parking lot.
