= Central Archives of the State (Italy) =

Coordinates: 41°49′43″N 12°28′36″E

- Archivio Centrale dello Stato
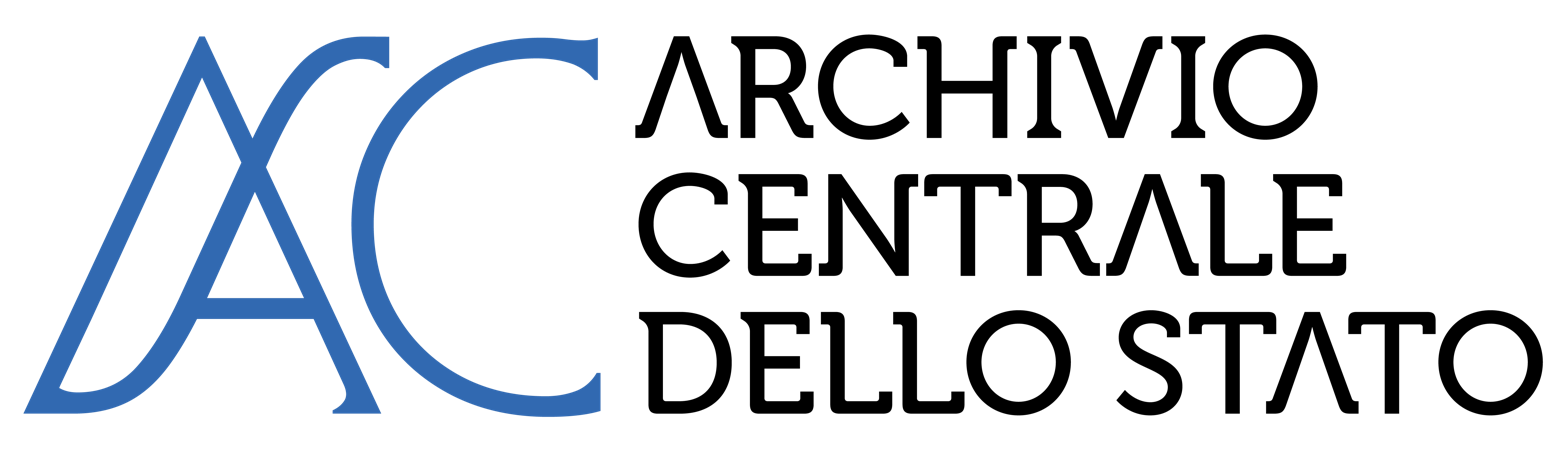

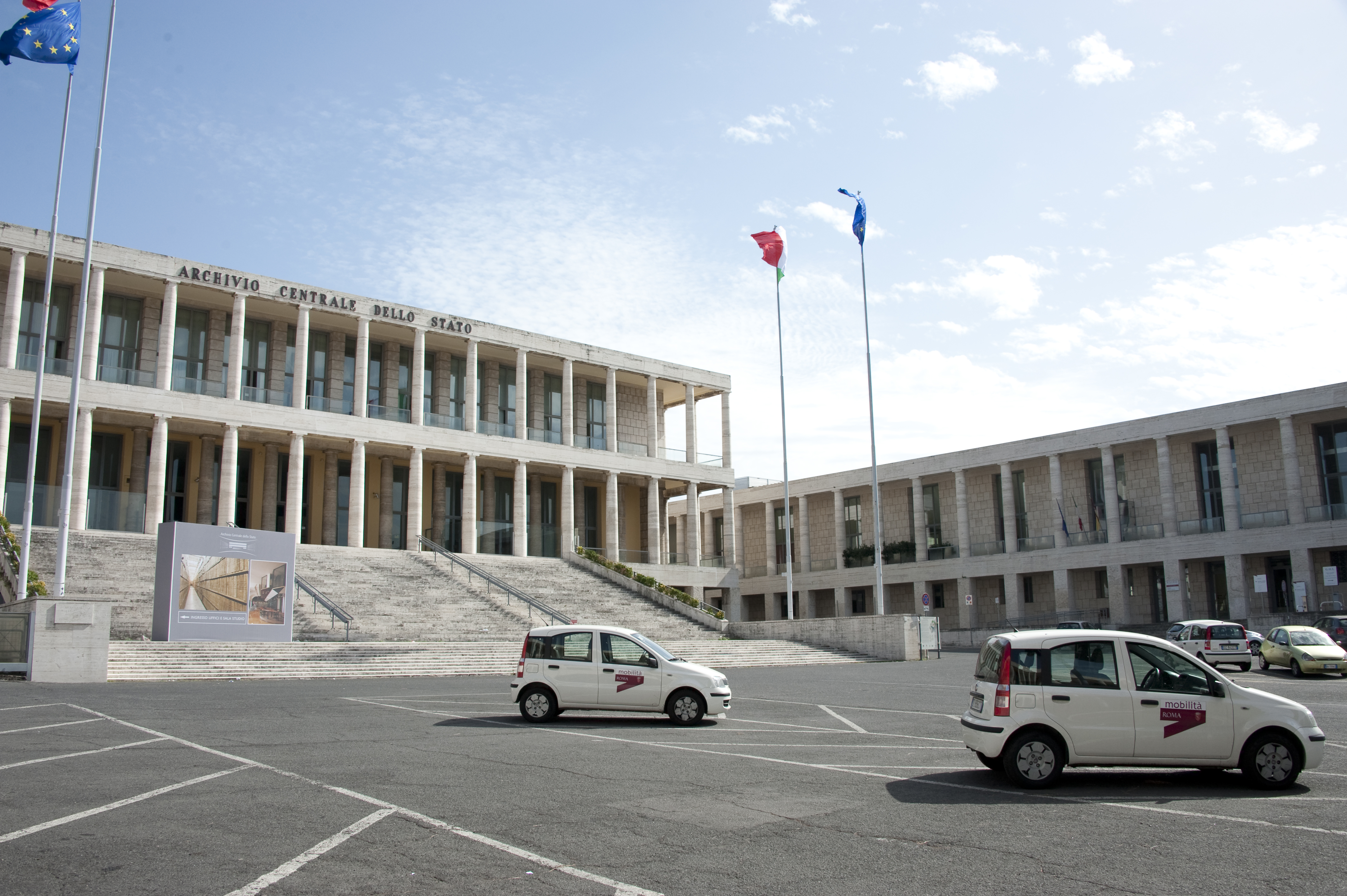
- Established: 1875 (151 years ago)
- Location: Rome, Italy
- Curator: Elisabetta Reale
- Website: www.acs.beniculturali.it

The Central Archives of the State (Italian: Archivio centrale dello Stato) is the national archives of Italy which keeps the archives and documents produced after the Unification of Italy (1861) by the central bodies of the Kingdom of Italy and of the present Italian Republic, as well as by public bodies of national importance and by selected private individuals.

== History ==
The Central Archives headquarters are located in EUR, Rome and while the organisation is ultimately under the aegis of the Ministry of Culture, it has significant operational autonomy. It was created in 1875 under the name of Royal Archives, and was renamed in 1953.

== Contents ==
The documents of the Italian pre-unification states, the notarial documents, and the documents after 1861 but produced locally, are preserved in a system of State Archives distributed throughout Italy, which includes 103 archives one for each Italian province, such as the State Archives of Florence, the State Archives of Milan and the State Archives of Venice, along with several additional local sub-branches. In Rome therefore are located two State Archives: the Central Archives of the State and the State Archives of Rome.

The Central State Archives «holds one of the three originals of the Constitution, signed on 27 December 1947 by the Provisional Head of State Enrico De Nicola, countersigned by the Prime Minister Alcide De Gasperi and the President of the Constituent Assembly Umberto Terracini, with the endorsement of the Keeper of the Seals Giuseppe Grassi».
