= K. Sudhakar =

K. Sudhakar may refer to:

- K. Sudhakar (automobile designer)
- K. Sudhakar (politician)
