= Sudha Cars Museum =

Automobile museum in Hyderabad, India

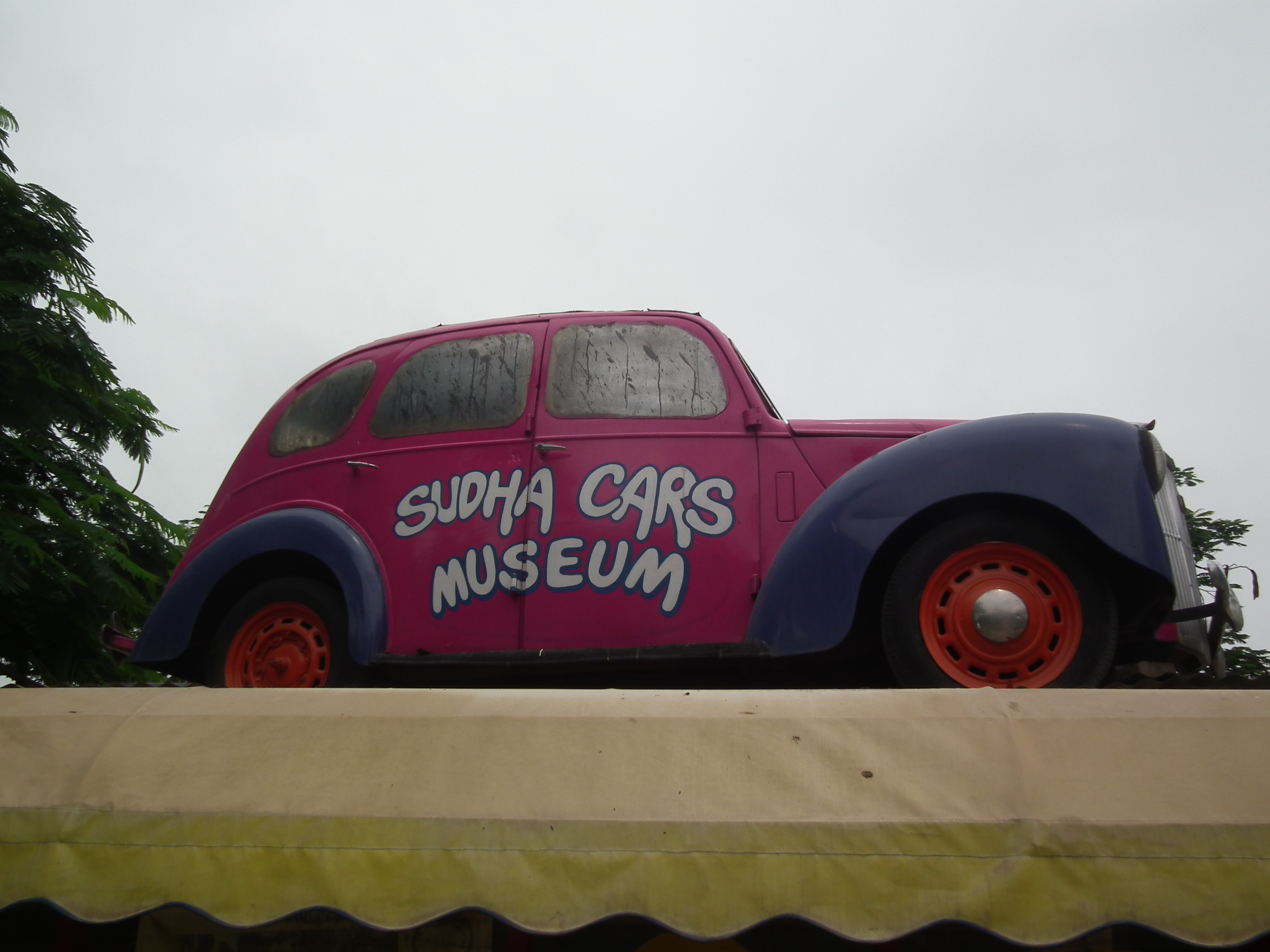
- Sudha Cars Museum

- Location within Telangana Location within India
- Established: 2010; 16 years ago
- Location: Hyderabad, Telangana, India
- Coordinates: 17.3569907°N 78.4544072°E
- Founder: K. Sudhakar
- Website: sudhacars.com

Sudha Cars Museum is an automobile museum located in Hyderabad, India. The museum displays "crazy cars" that resemble everyday objects. These cars are handmade by Kanyaboyina Sudhakar (known mainly as K. Sudhakar or K. Sudhakar Yadav) who started it as his hobby in his school days and opened the dedicated museum in 2010.

== History ==
Sudhakar Yadav had an inclination towards motor cars and mechanics since childhood. He created his first car at the age of 14 collecting the necessary articles from junkyards. His name was in the Guinness World Records in 2005 for the largest tricycle. On 1 July 2005 he rode the largest tricycle in Hyderabad which had an overall height of 12.67 metres (41.6 ft). The tricycle's wheel diameter was 5.18 metres (17.0 ft) and the length was 11.37 metres (37.3 ft). Yadav and his museum are mentioned in the Limca Book of Records and have also been featured on Ripley's Believe It or Not!

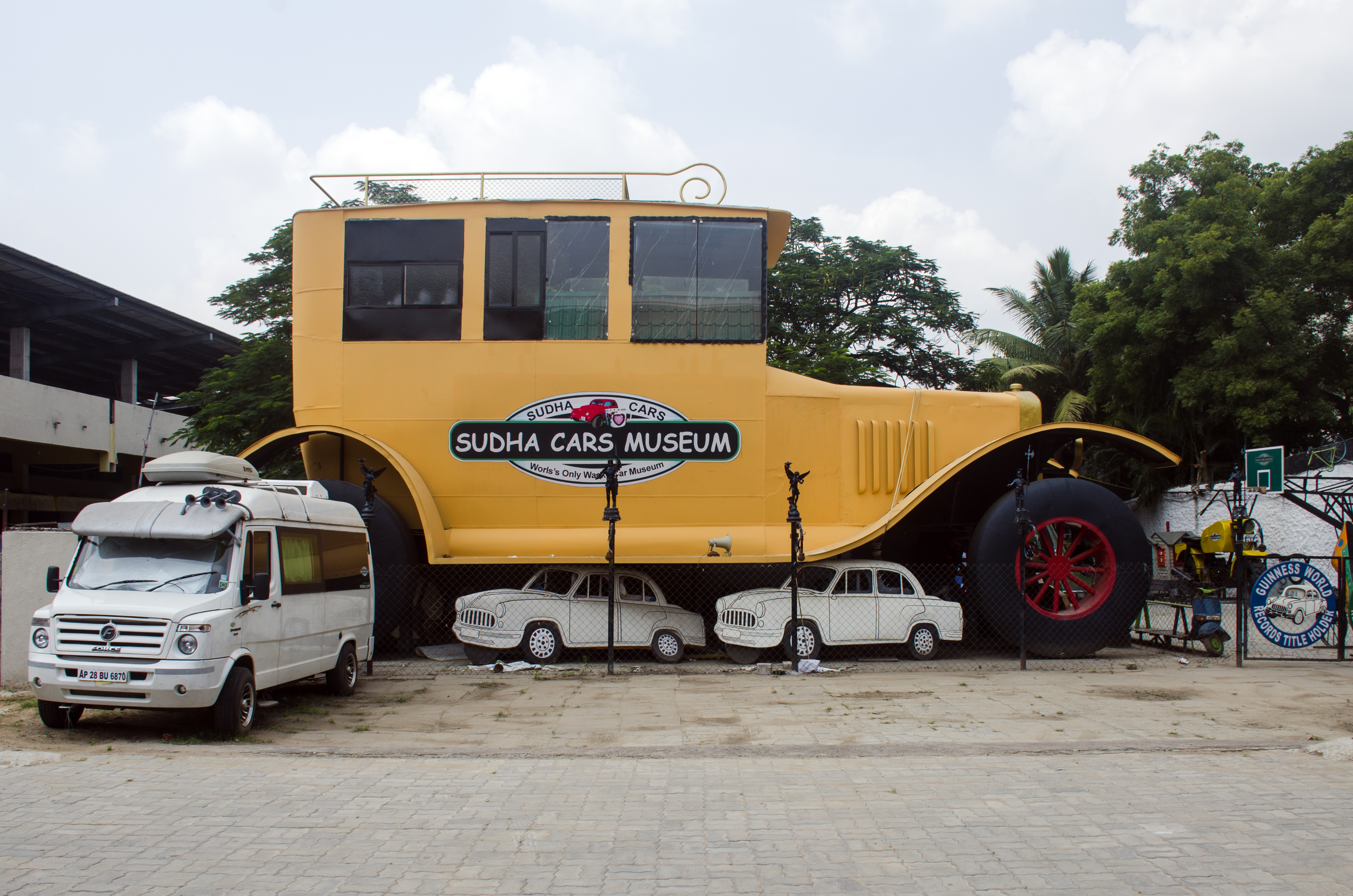
Entrance of Sudha Car Museum

== Exhibits ==
All the exhibits of the museum accompany a plaque giving information of the make of the car, the time it took to manufacture and the maximum speed it can attain. The museum also has the smallest double decker bus in the world which can accommodate 10 people. Twelve different motor cycles in small size are on display of which the smallest is 33 centimetres (13 in) in height and can be driven at the speed of 30 kilometres per hour (19 mph).

Yadav stated that some of the cars are created keeping special occasions in mind. For Women's Day, he designed a car shaped like a handbag and stiletto that was powered by a 6cc engine. For Bal Diwas (Children's Day), he designed cars based on a pen, pencil and sharpener. A condom shaped car was unveiled to commemorate World AIDS Day.

The homemade cars cost around ₹85,000–₹150,000 (£1,000–£1,800) for manufacturing; but are not for sale. The cars are often brought out of the museum for road shows where people can see them being driven.

Also on display are modified cars. These include a three wheeled auto converted into a van and a Maruti van converted into a single boogie tram. The display also includes a variety of Tandem bicycles, supporting up to 6 riders. Several motorcycles with modified side cars are also on display. These include shoe and commode shaped side cars.

== Gallery ==
Exhibits at the museum
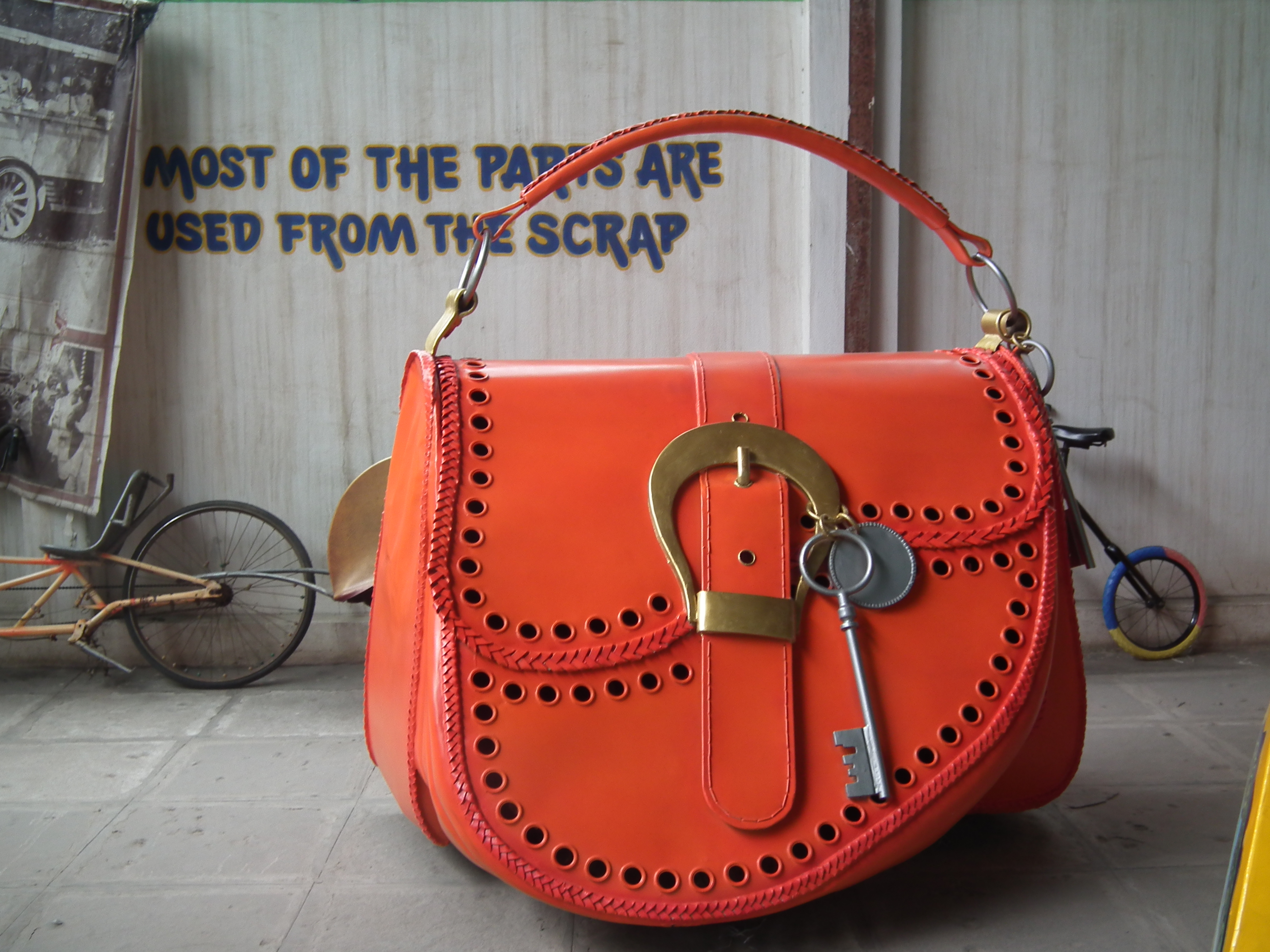
Car shaped like a handbag

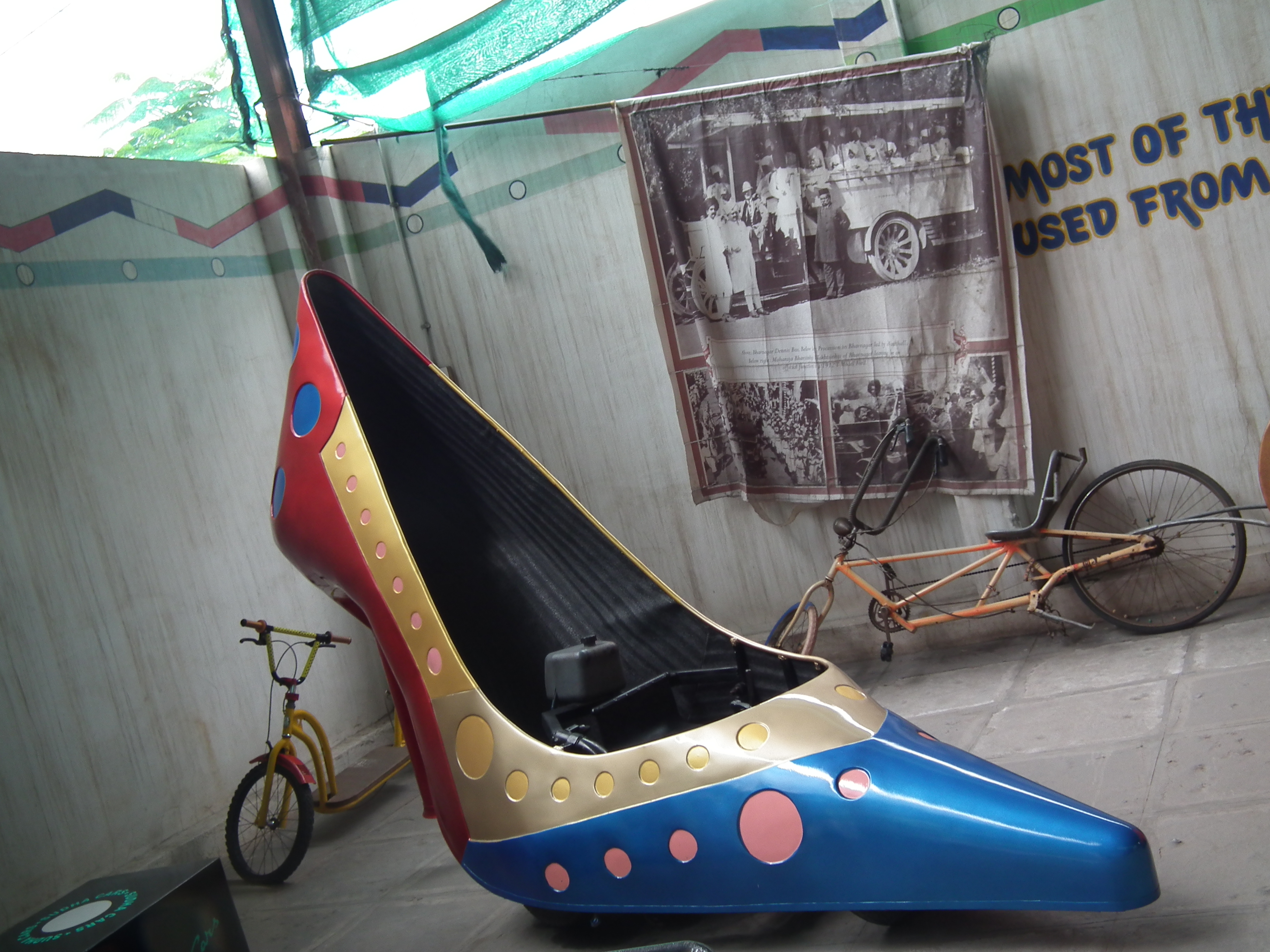
Car shaped like stiletto heels

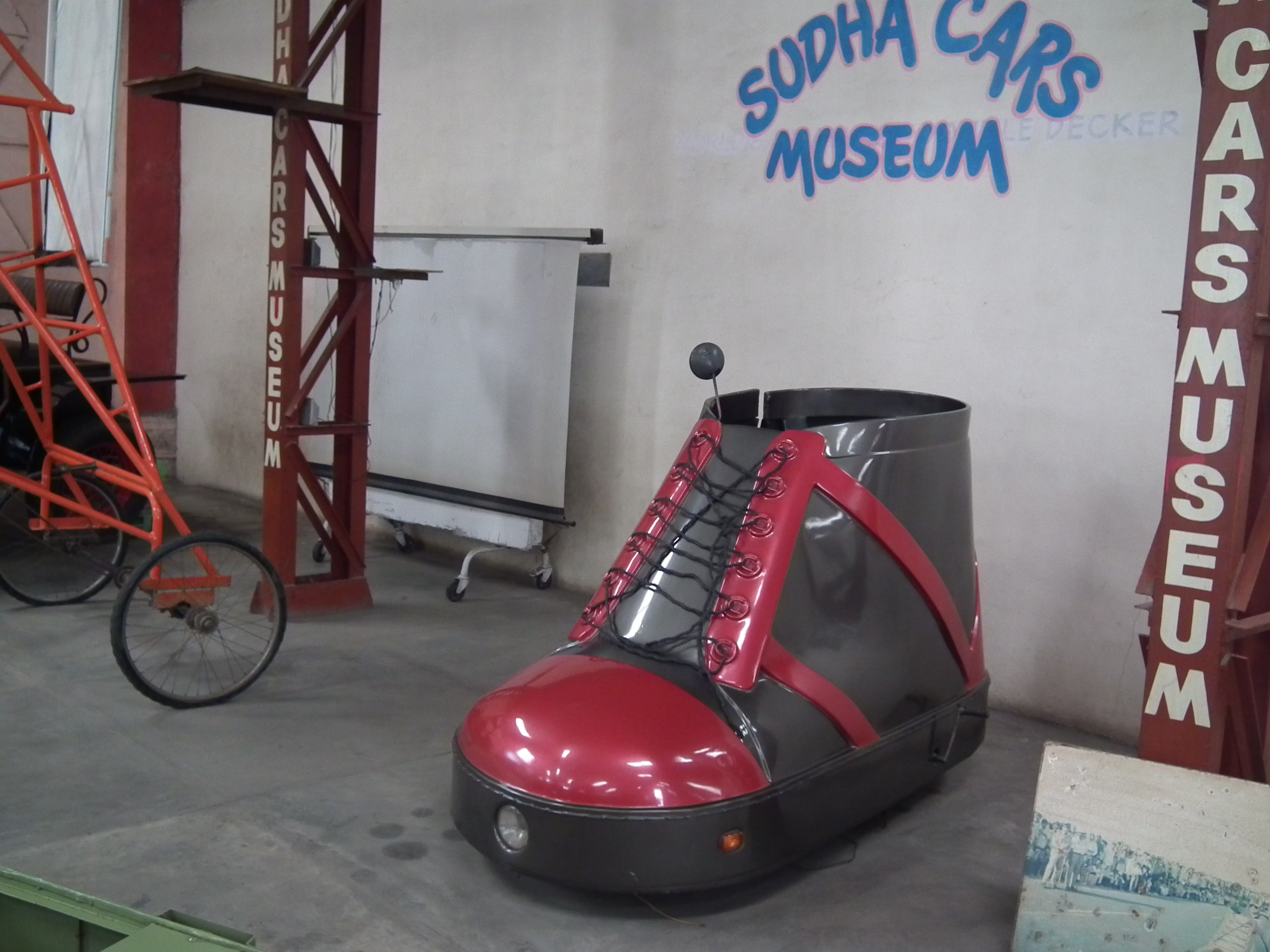
Car shaped like a shoe

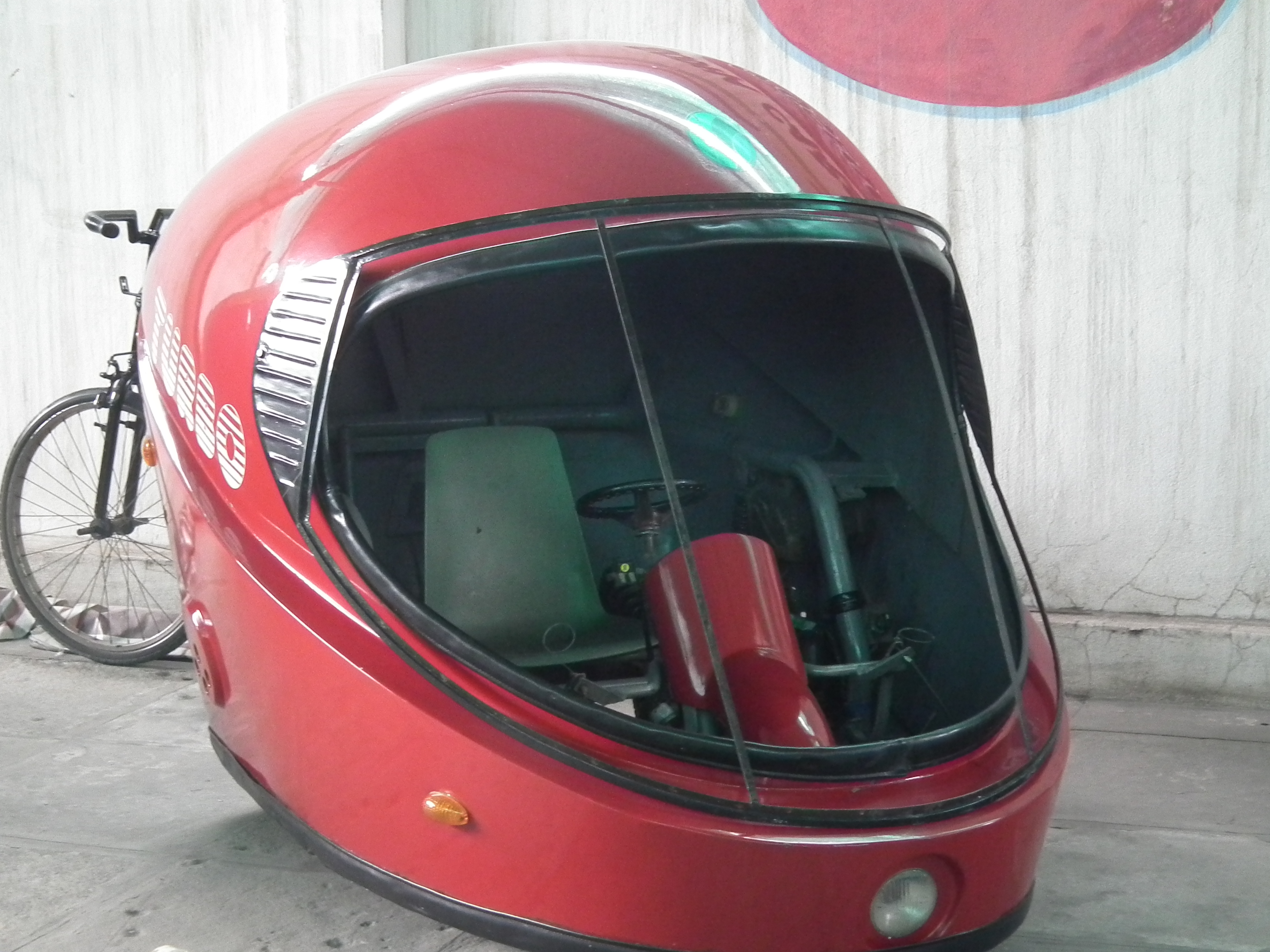
Car shaped like a helmet

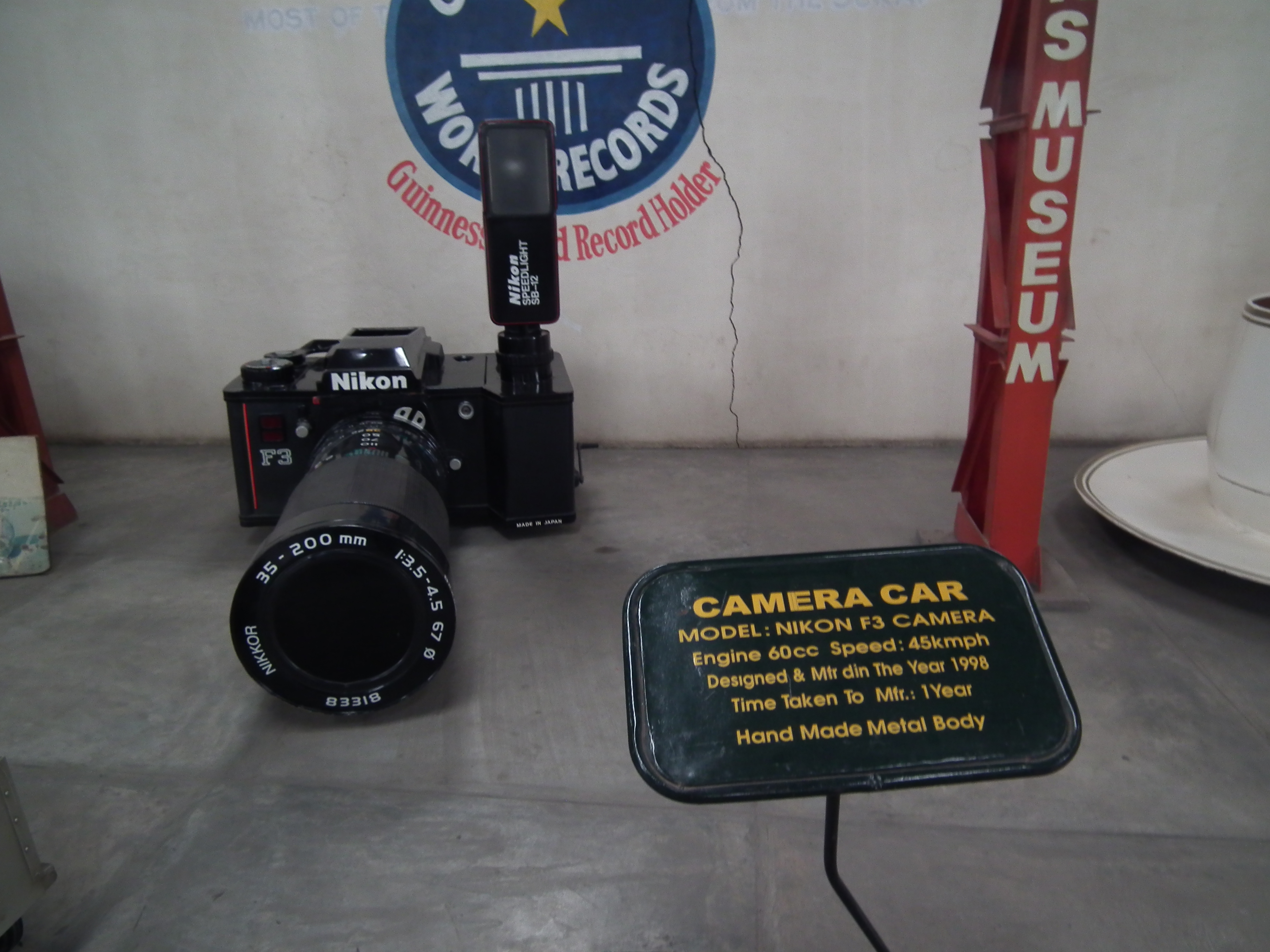
Car shaped like a camera

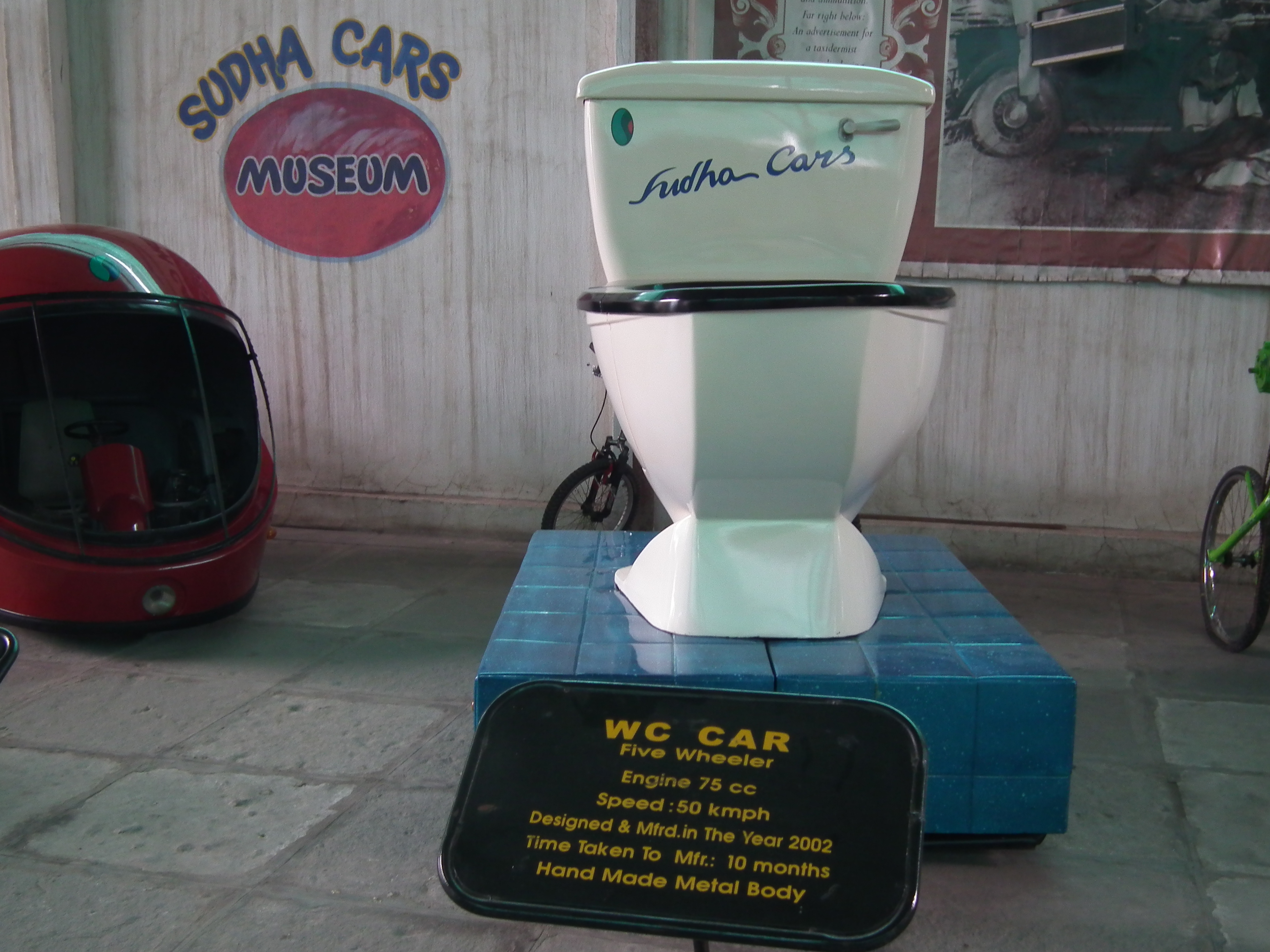
Car shaped like a toilet

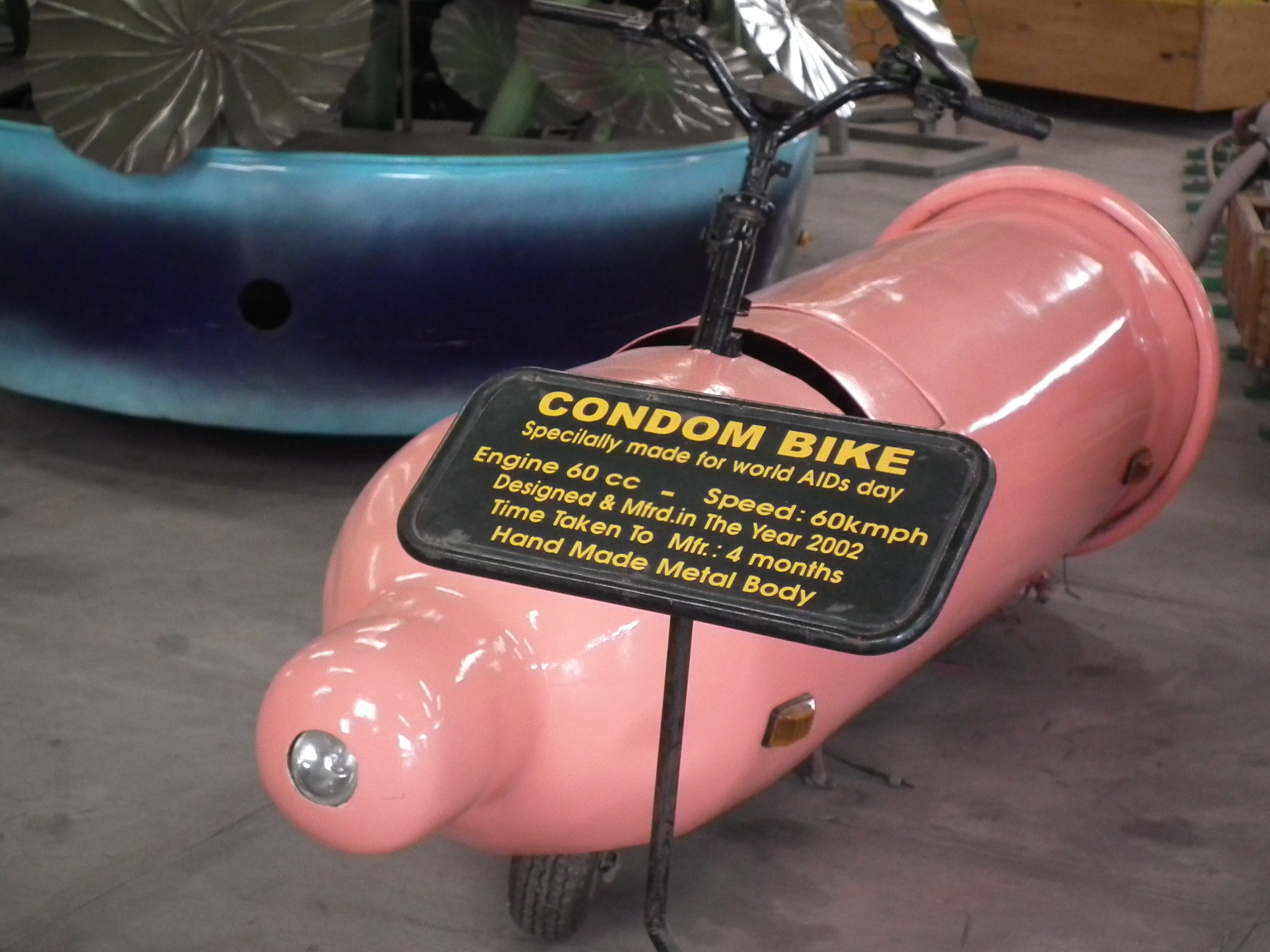
Car shaped like a condom

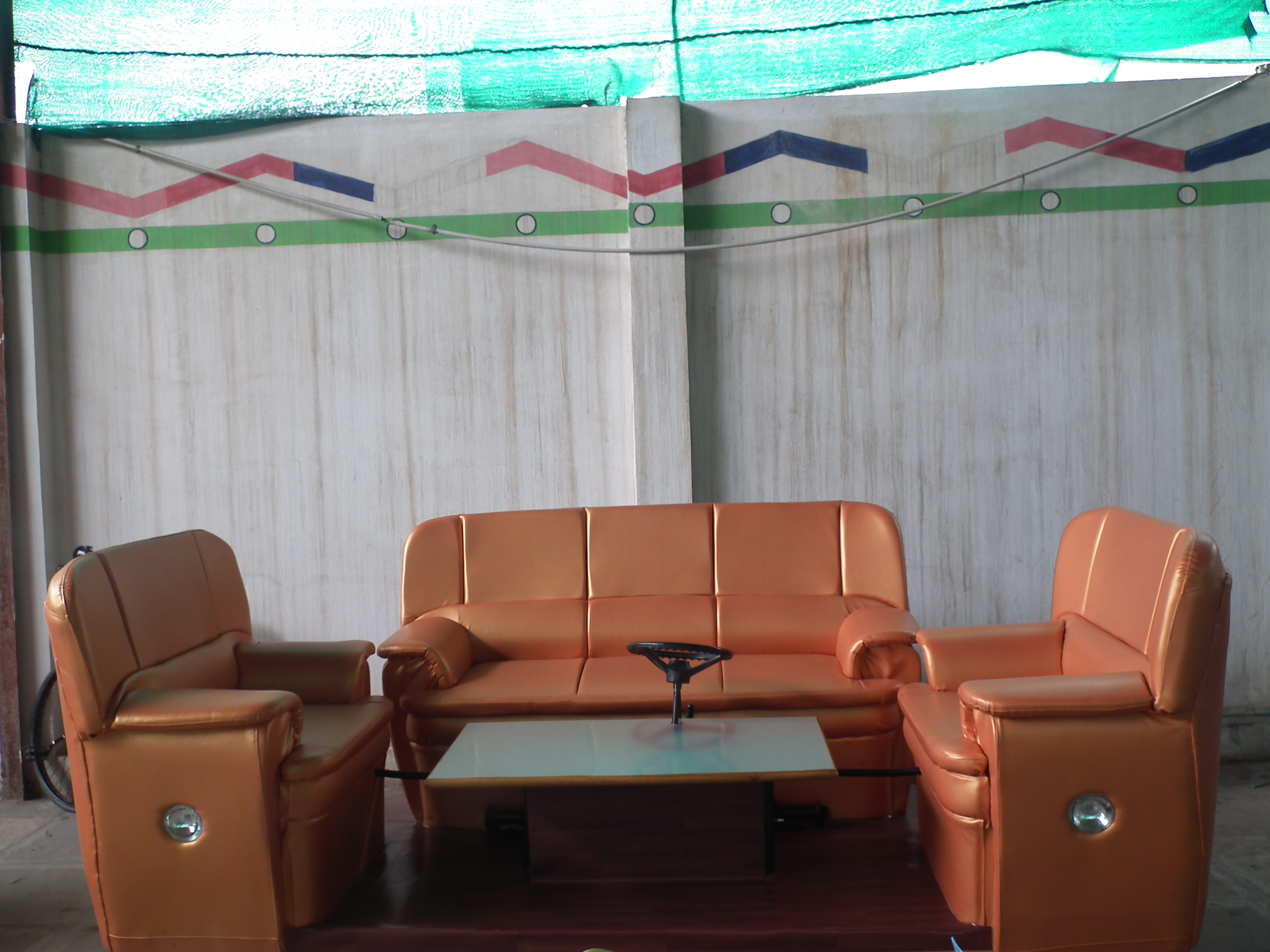
Car shaped like a couch

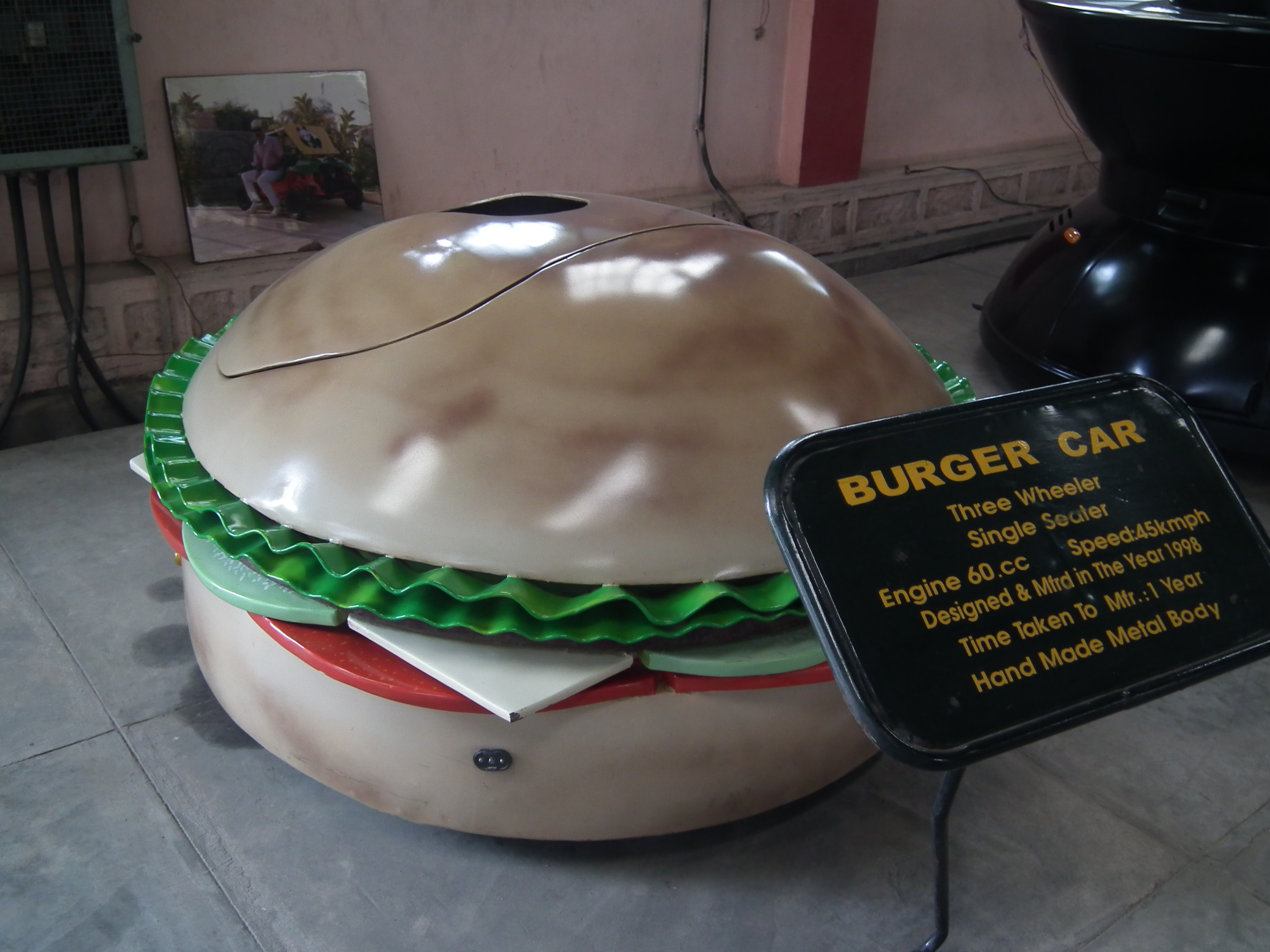
Car shaped like a burger

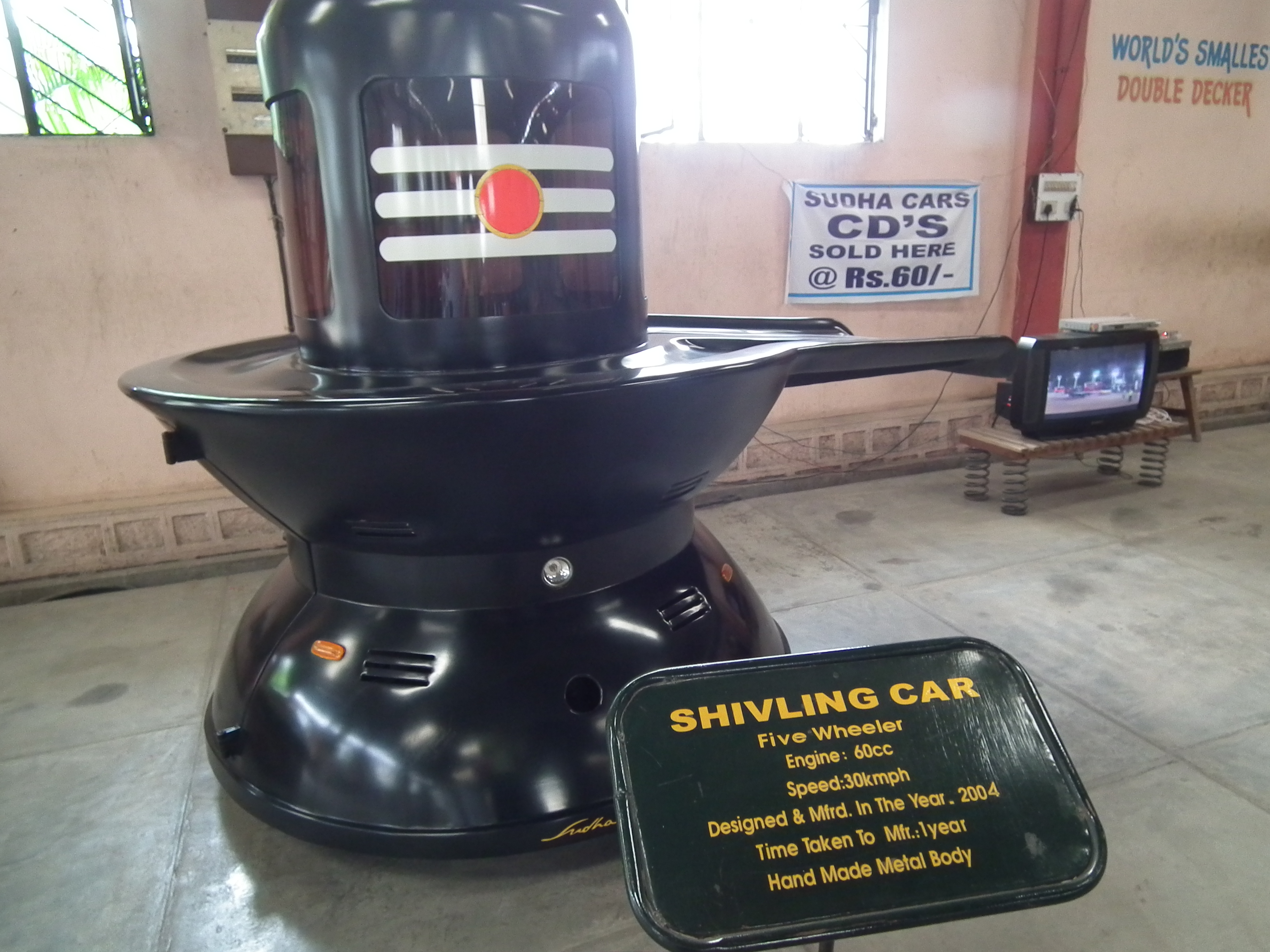
Car shaped like a Shivlinga

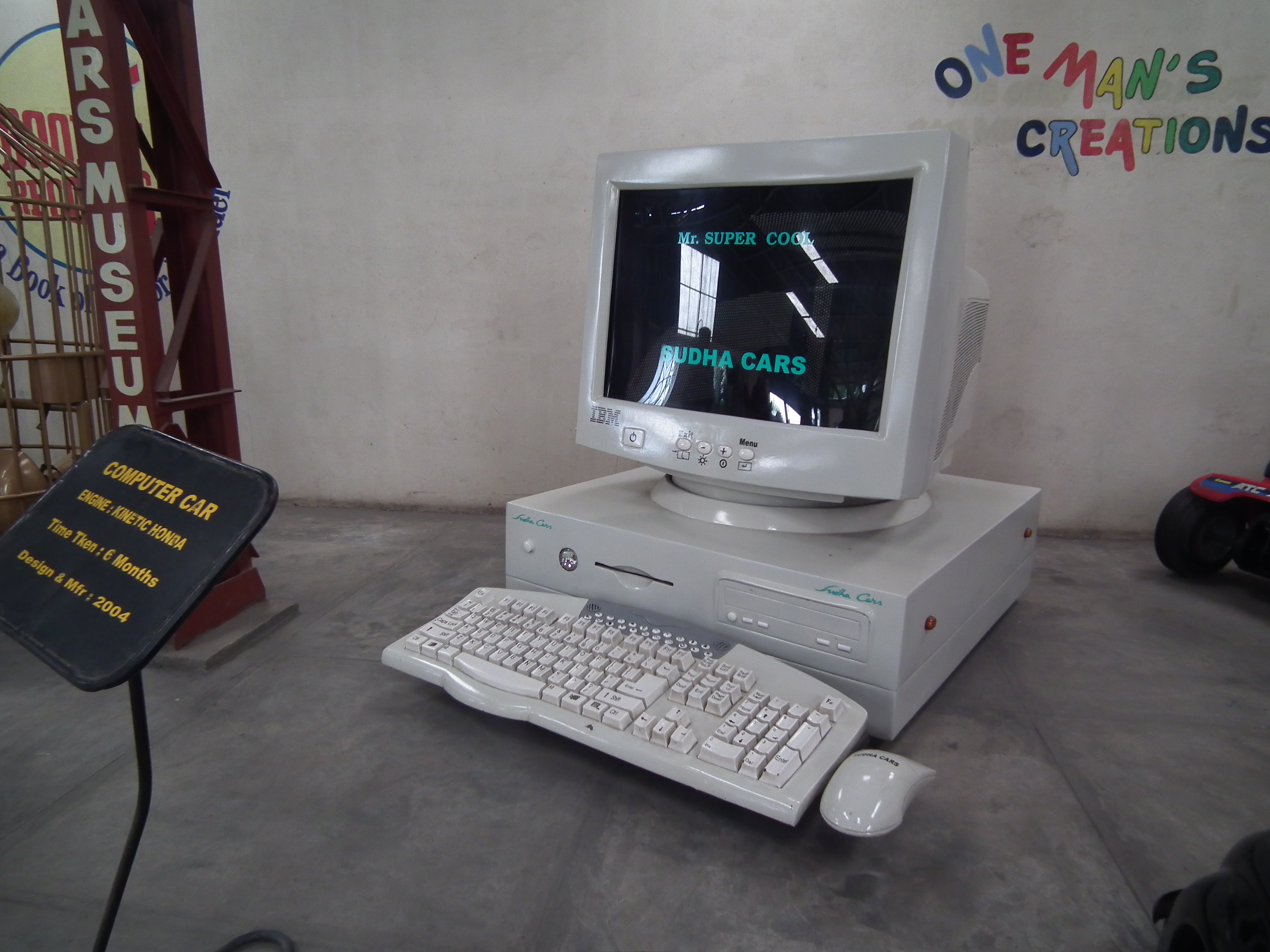
Car shaped like a computer

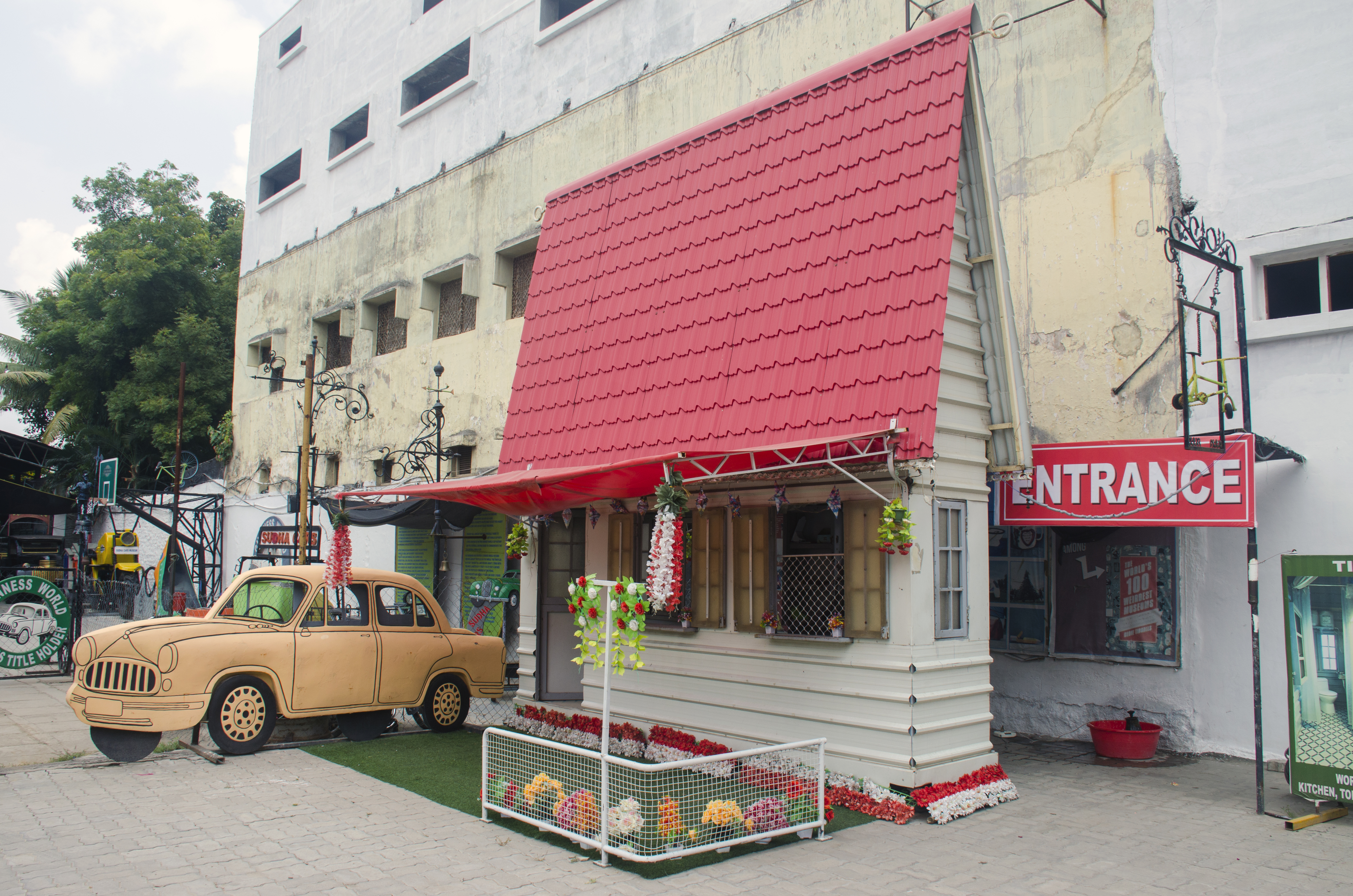
Ticket Counter of Sudha Car Museum

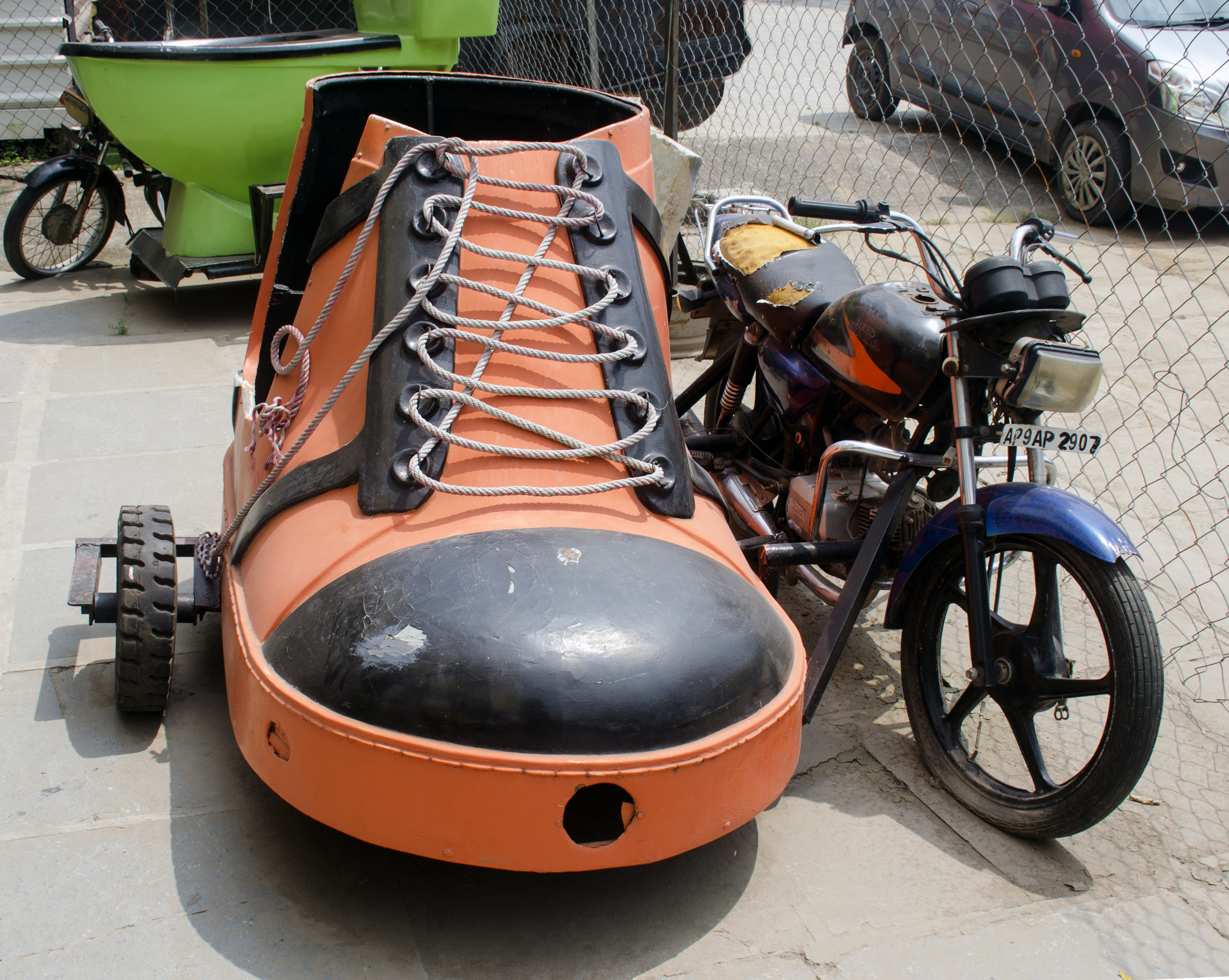
A motorcycle with a shoe shaped side car

== See also ==
- List of automobile museums
