= Payana Museum =

Coordinates: 12.3899°N 76.6691°E

- Payana Museum logo

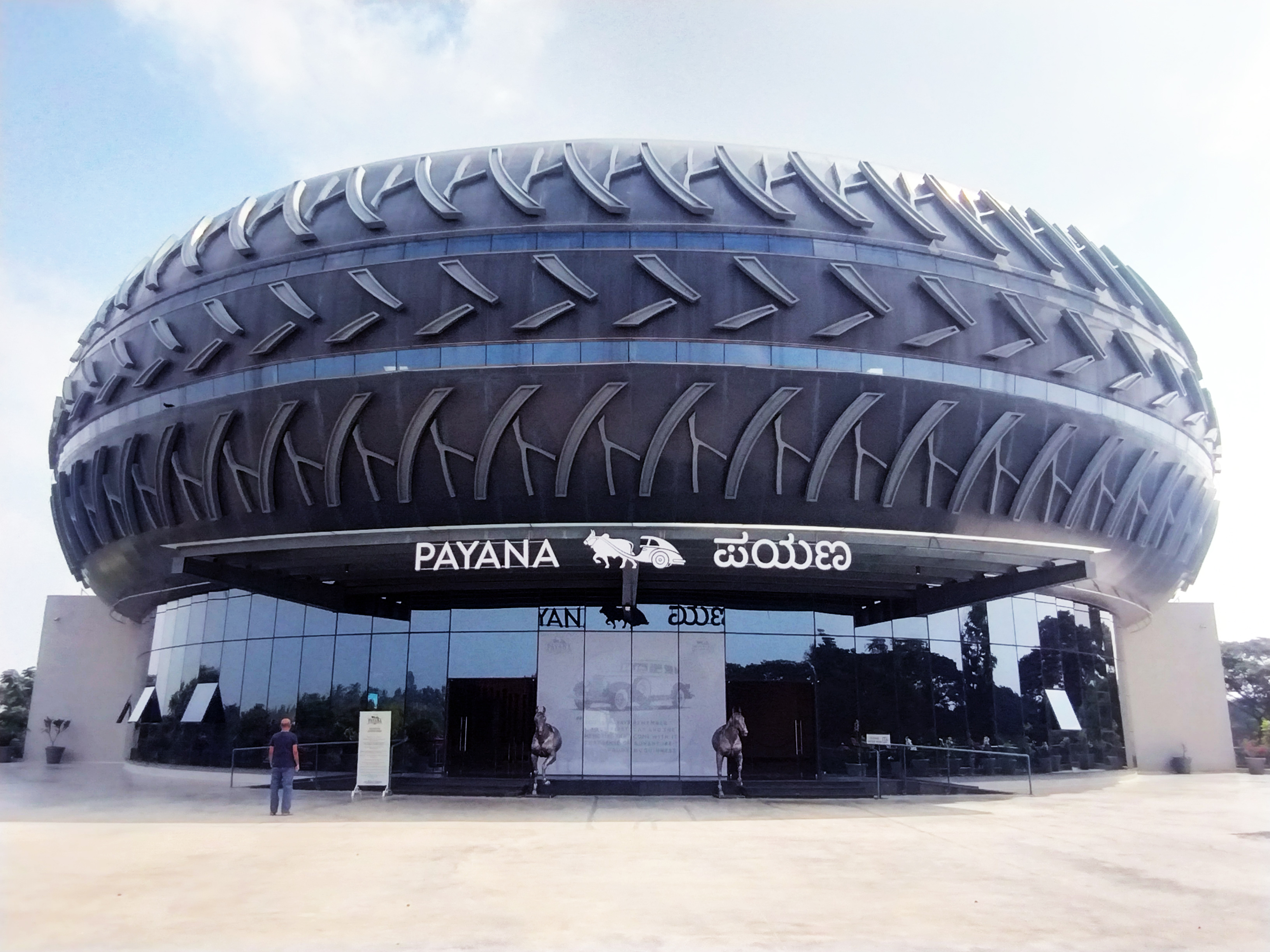
- The dome of the museum at the entrance, in November 2025

- Location within India Location within Asia
- Established: 2024
- Location: Bangalore-Mysore Expressway, Brahmapura, Srirangapatna, Mandya district - 5771477
- Type: Automotive museum
- Owner: Veerendra Heggade
- Website: www.payanamuseum.com

Payana Museum is an automotive museum in Bangalore-Mysore Expressway, Mandya district, Karnataka, India.

== History ==
The museum was opened in 2024. It was established by Dr D Veerendra Heggade.

== Collection ==
The museum has a collection of 69 vehicles. It includes a 1925 Fiat 501, jeeps used in World War II, as well as a 1949 Daimler DE 36 which belonged to the Maharaja of Mysore. The museum also has motorcycles, scooters, and carts on display.

== Media gallery ==
Payana museum in November 2025
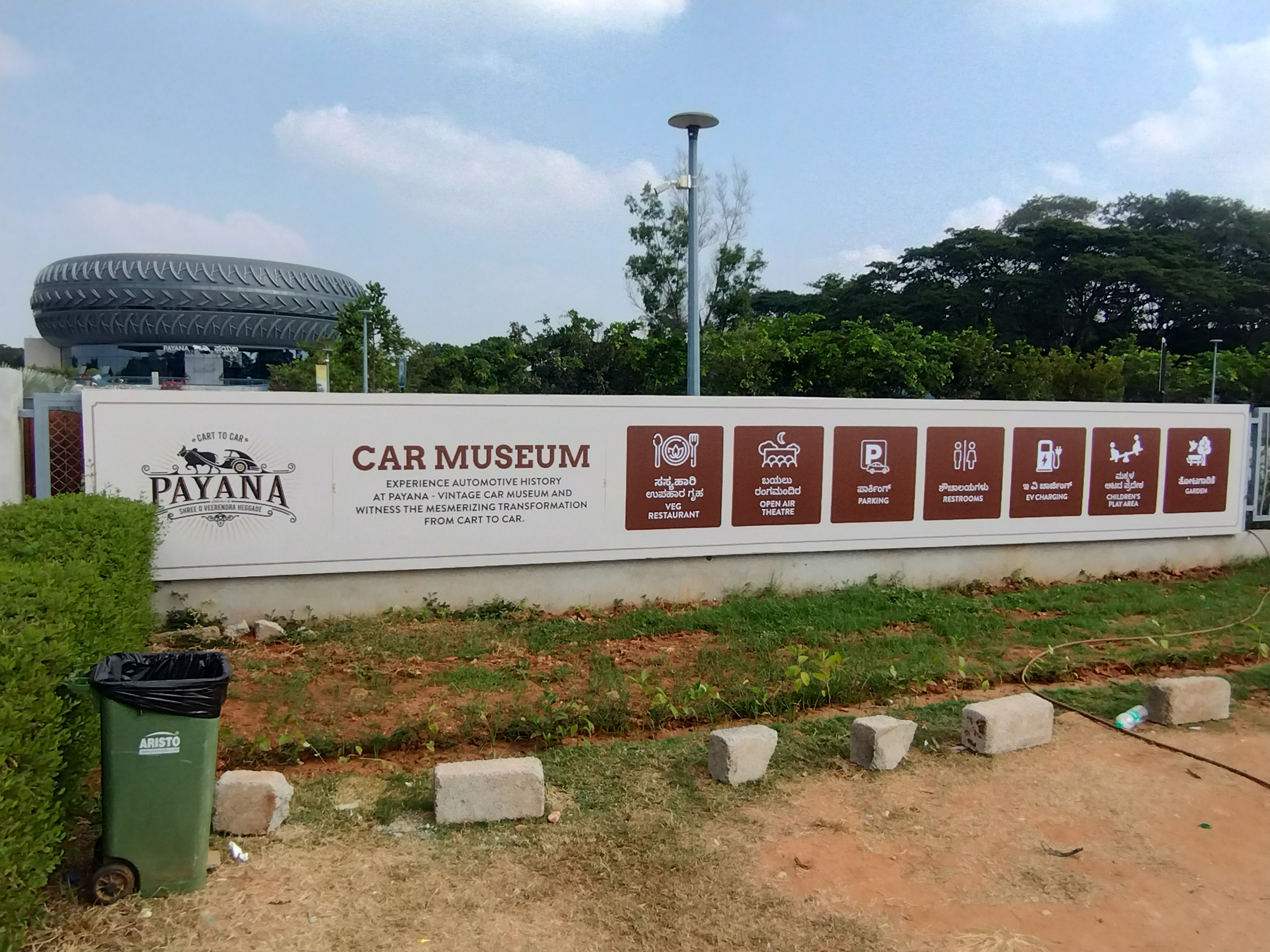

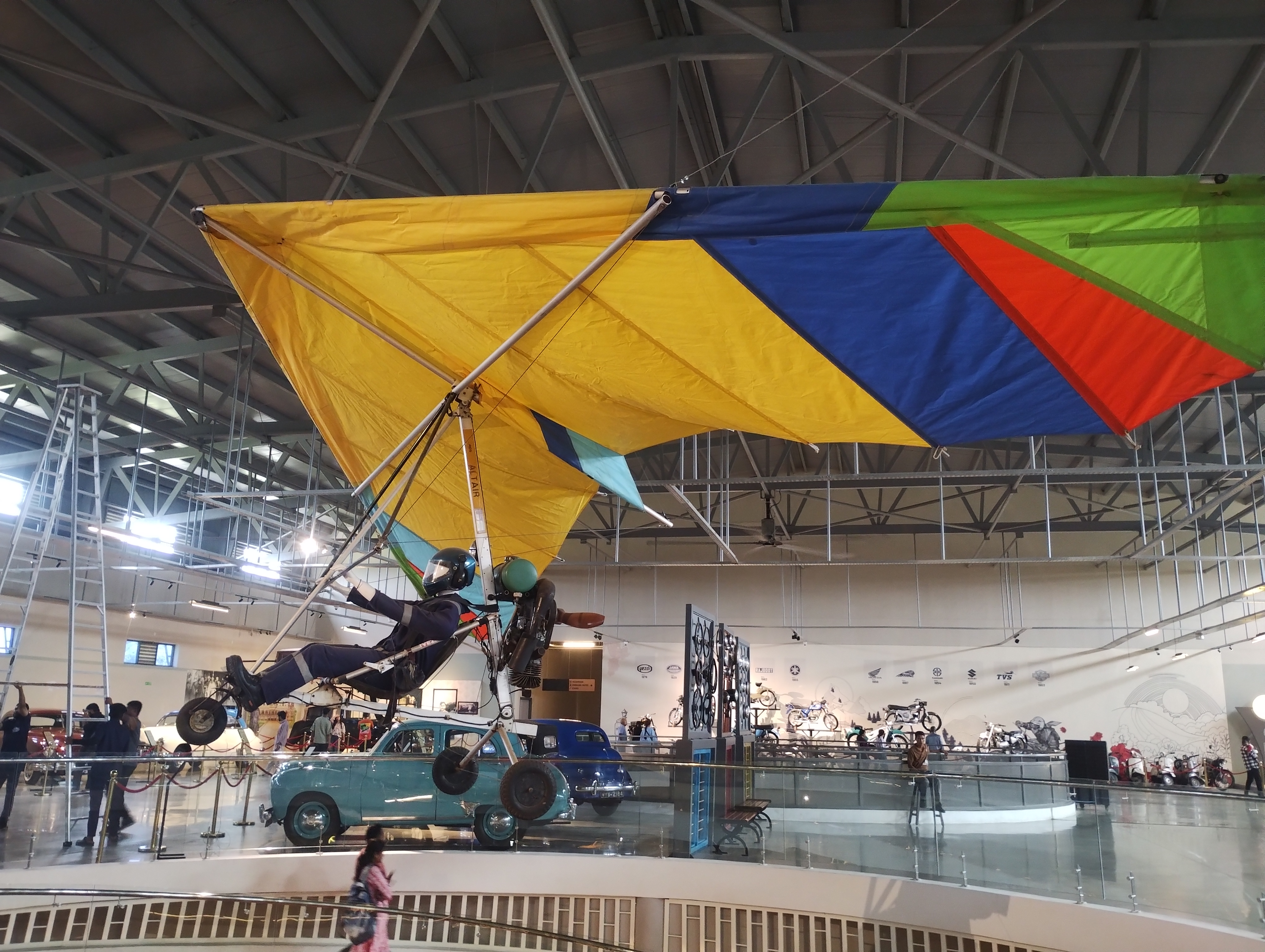

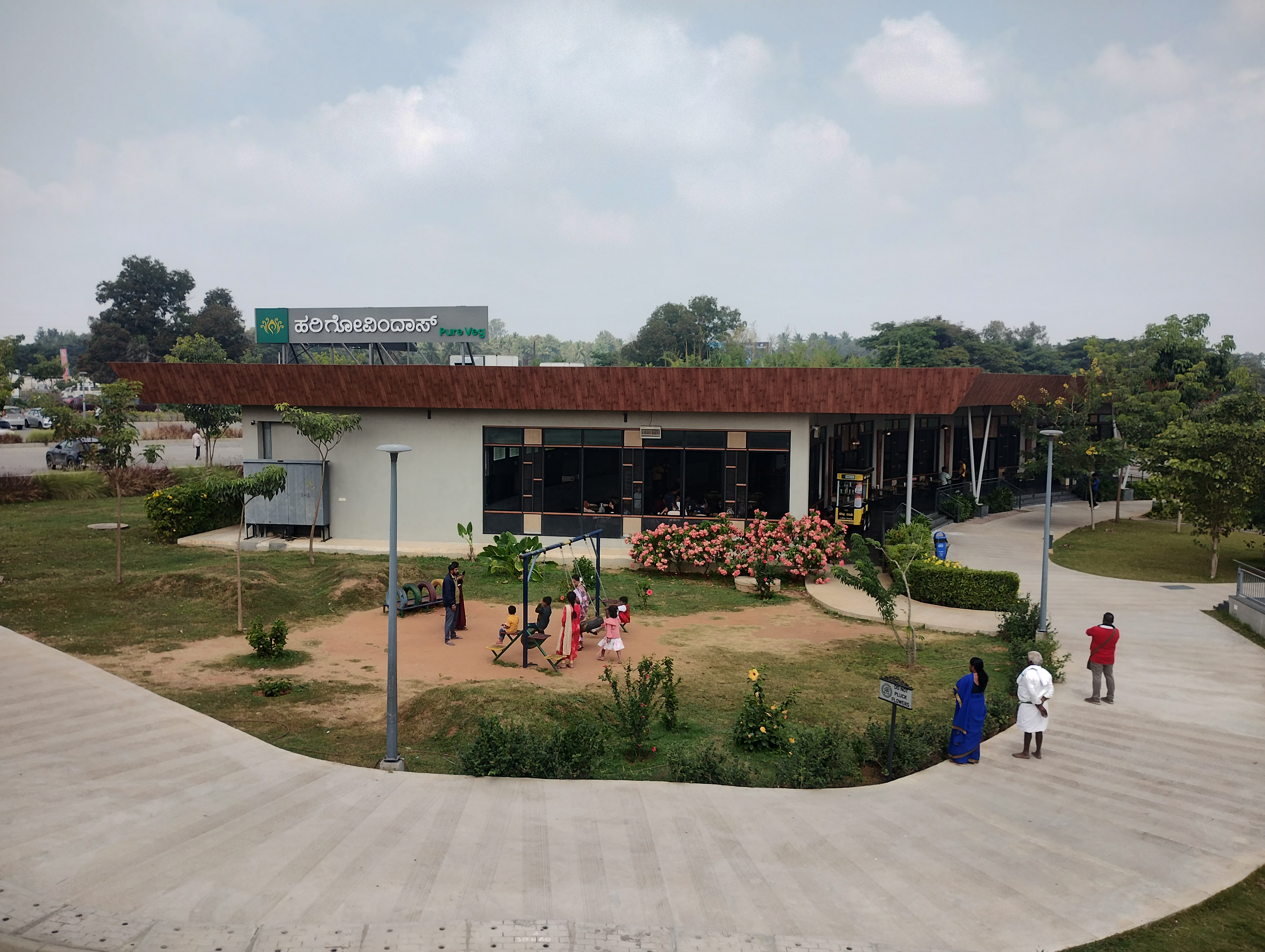

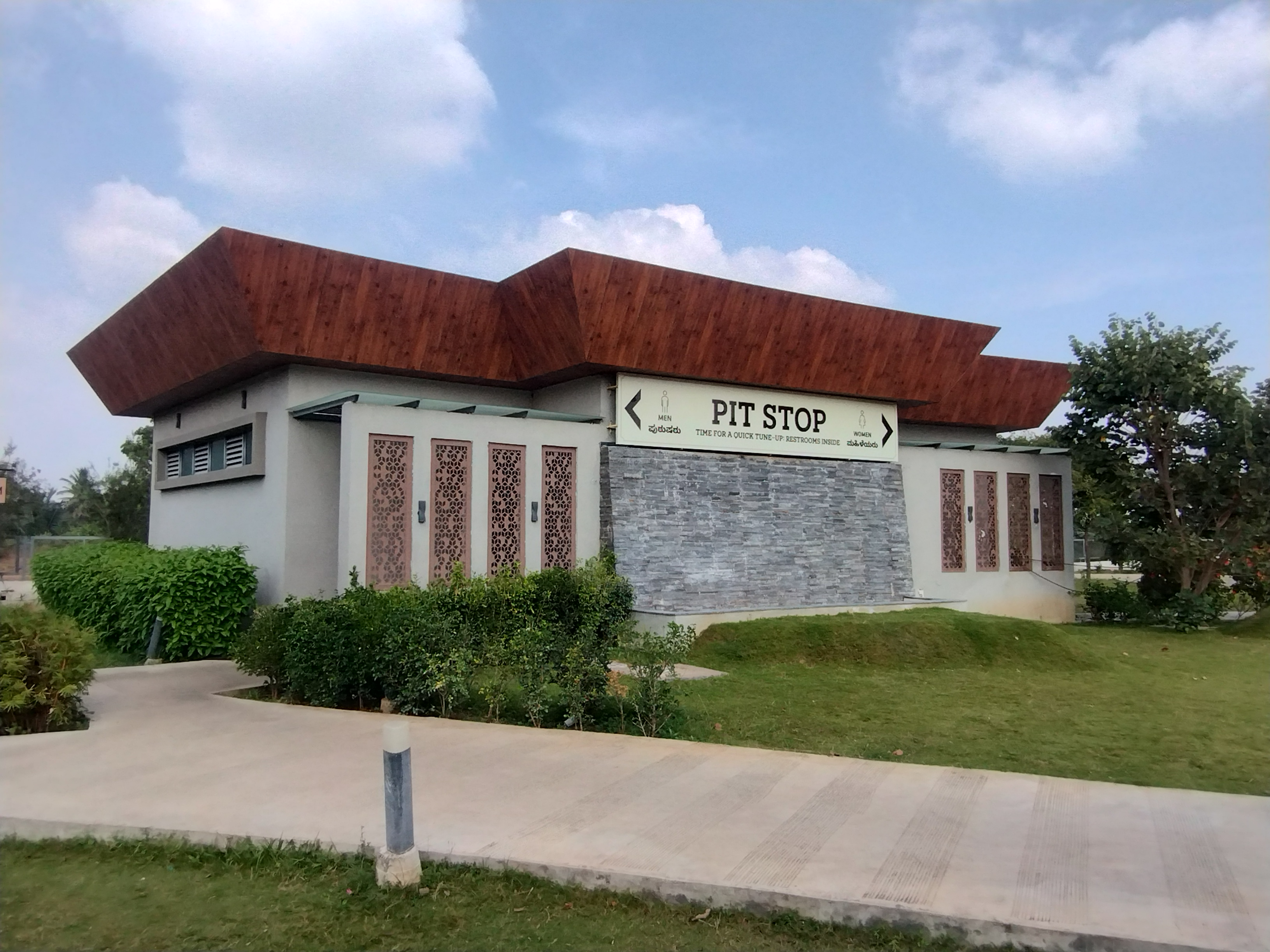

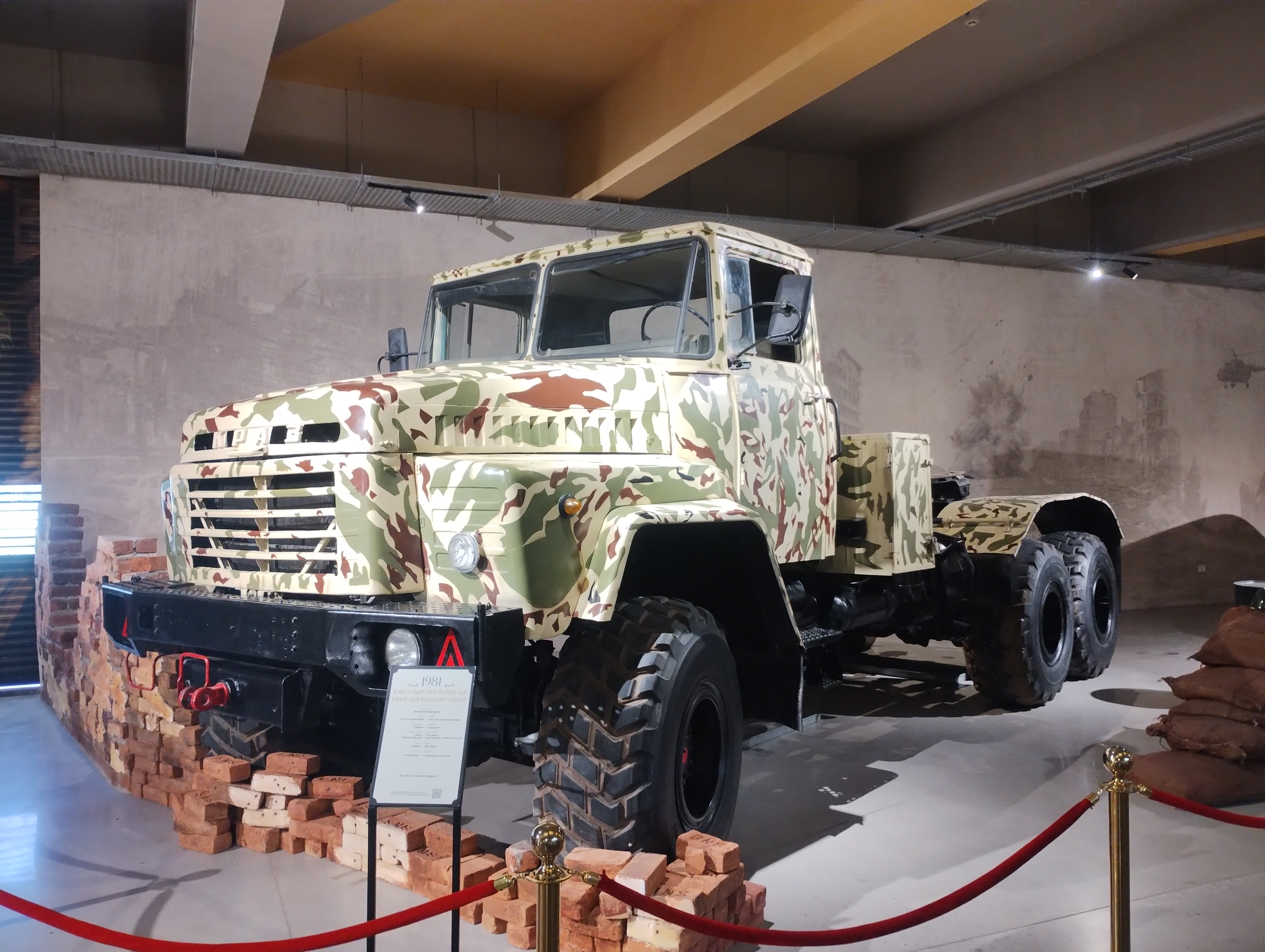
Payana museum at 4^{th} International Auto Show, Palace grounds, Bangalore (2025)
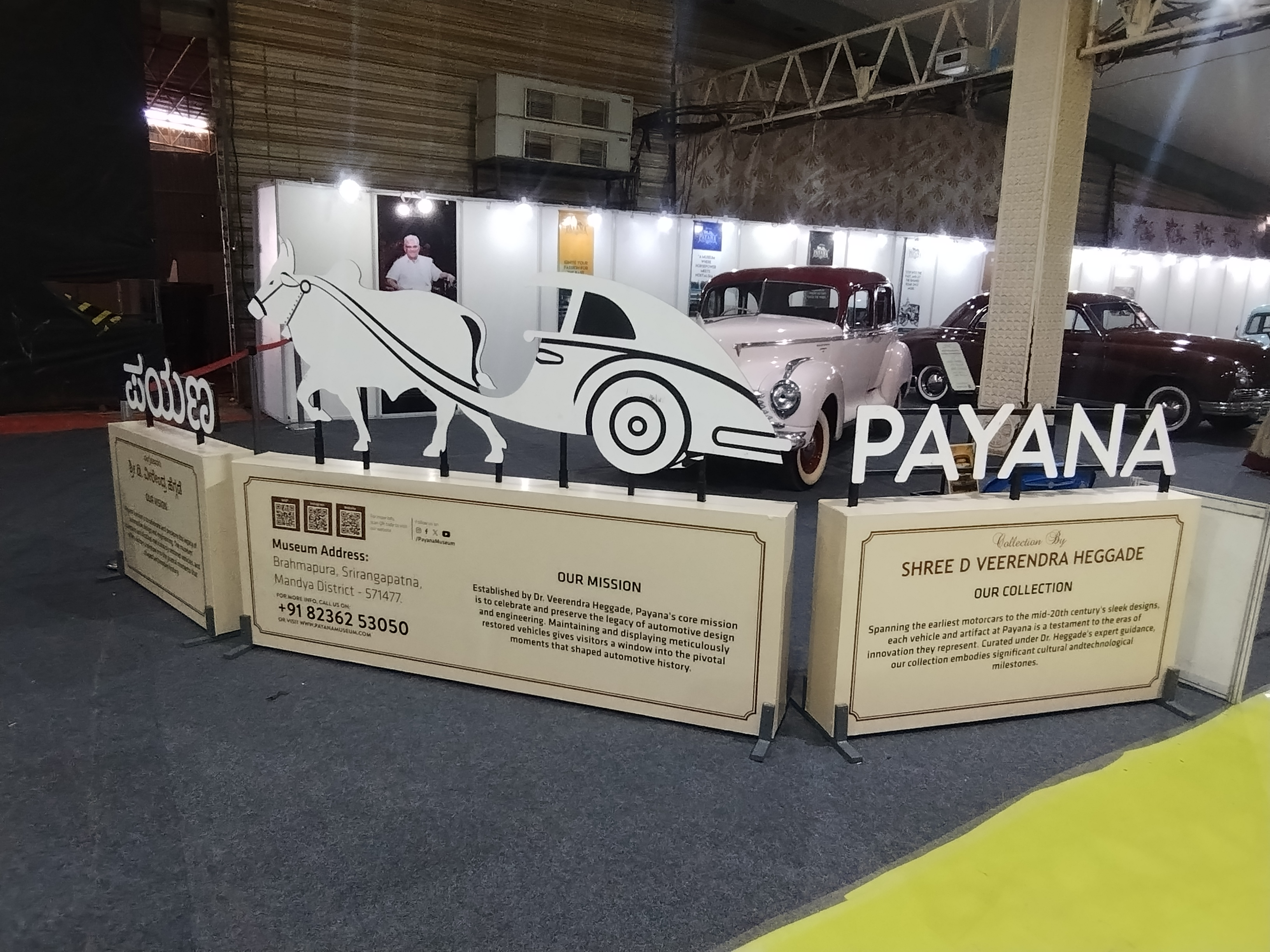

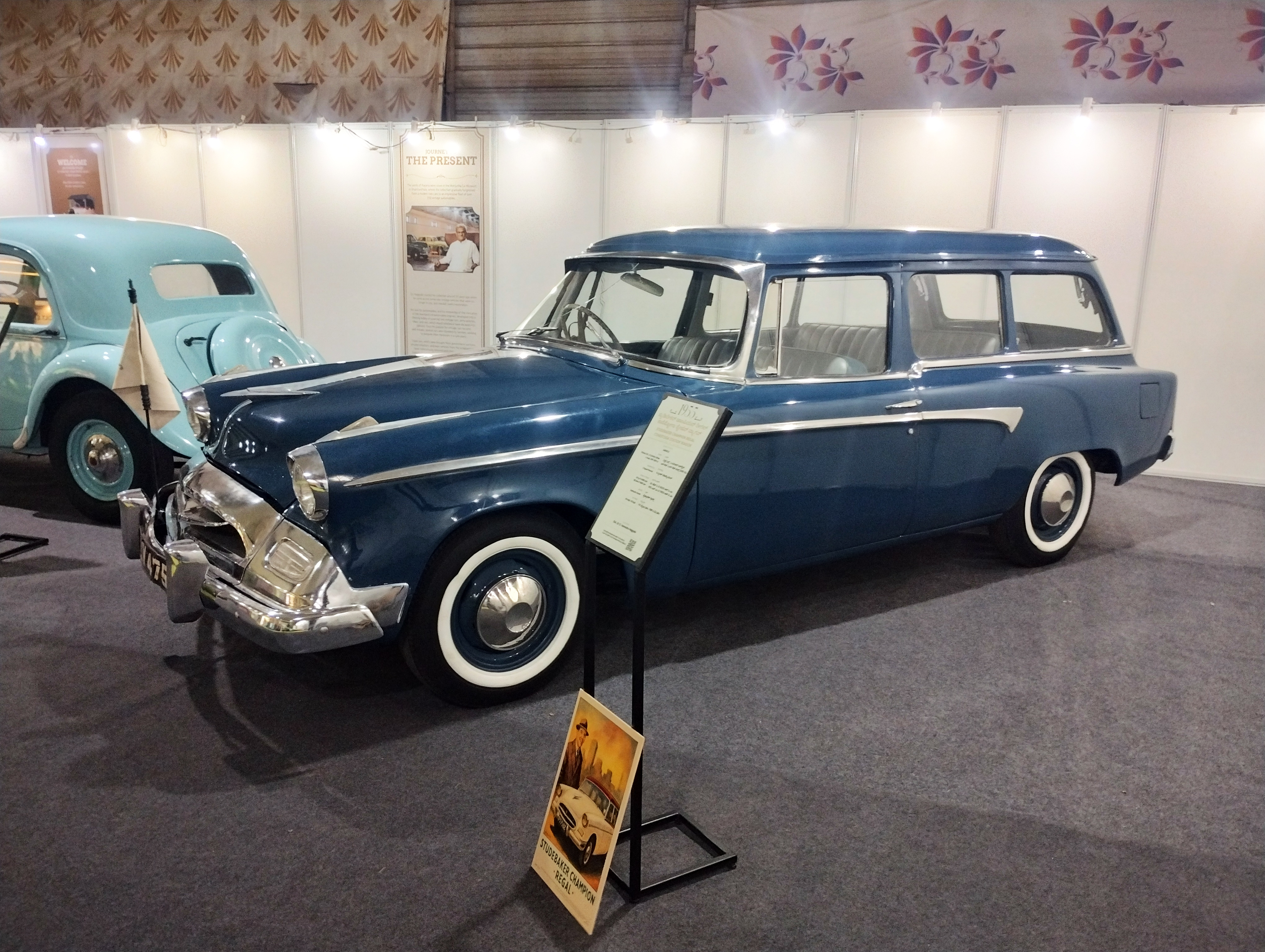

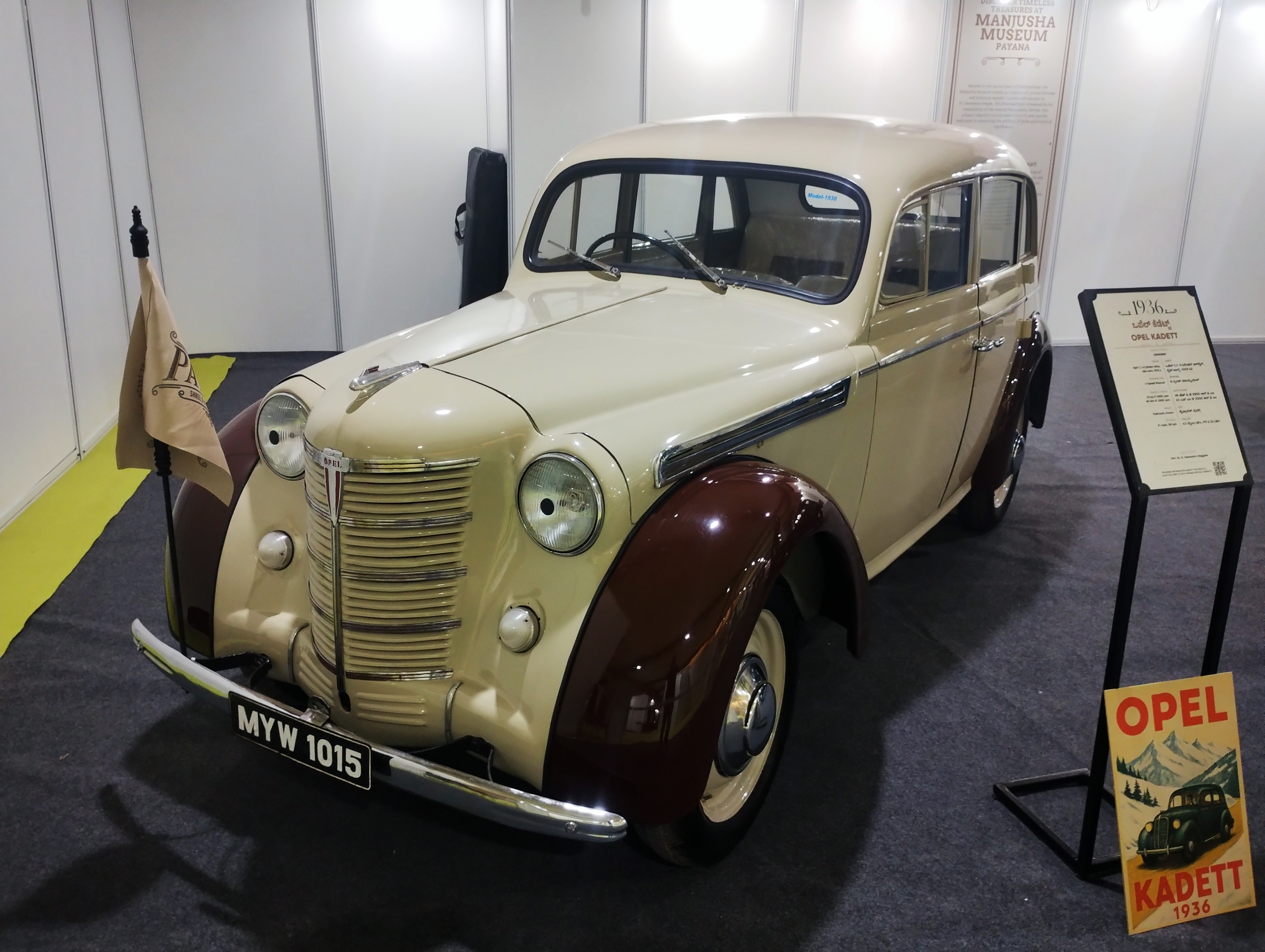

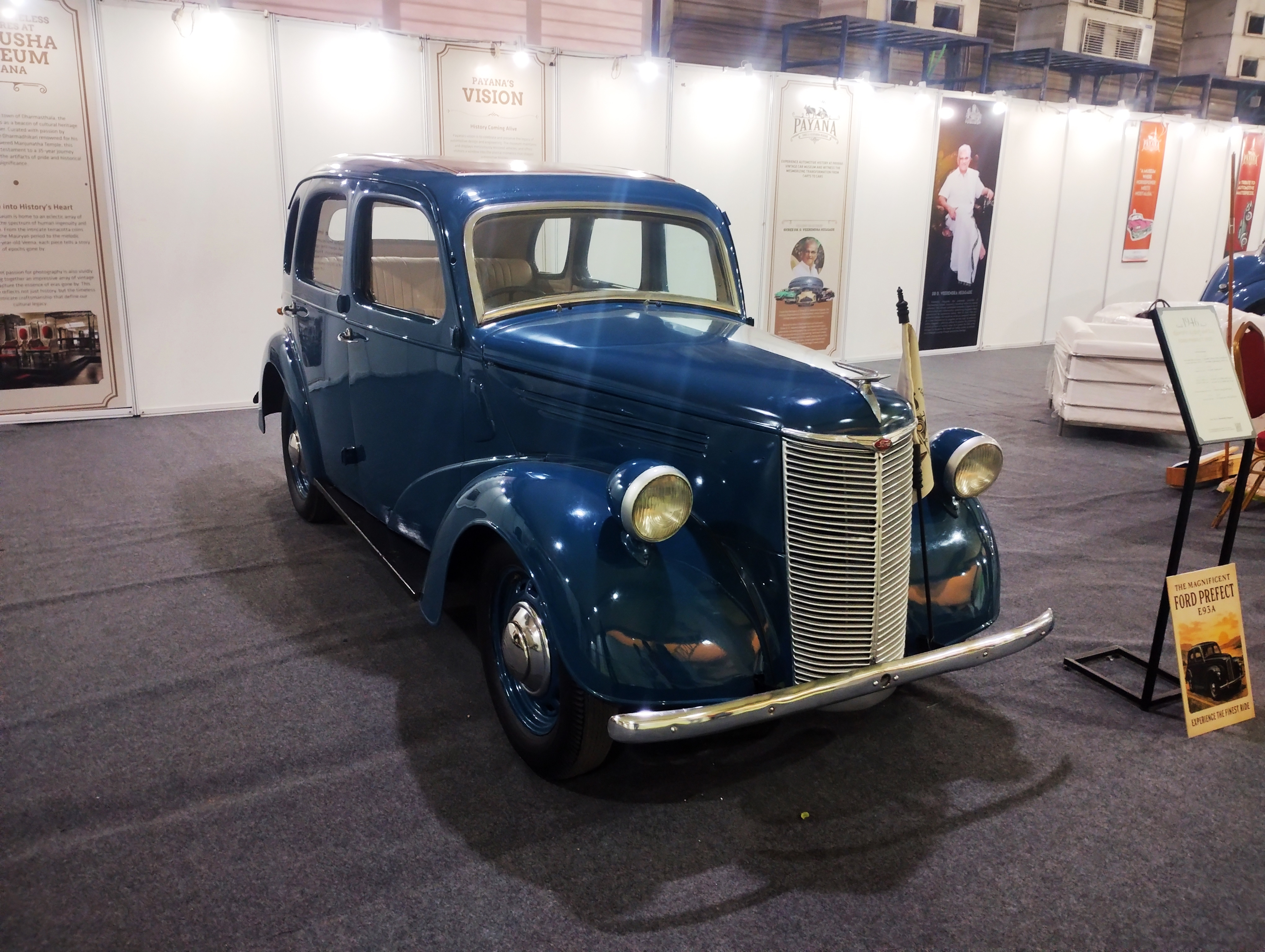

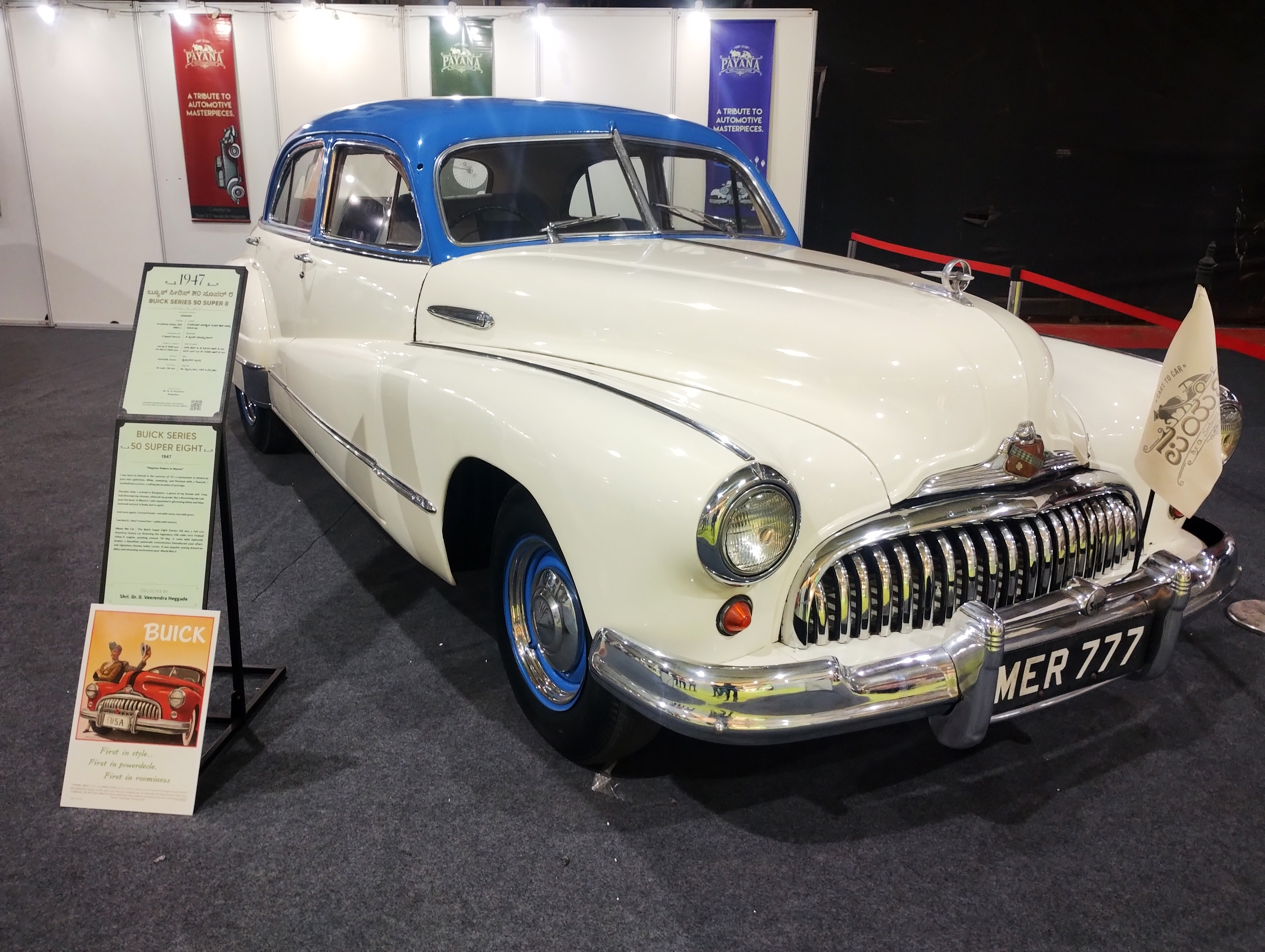
