= Brentwood =

Brentwood may refer to:

== Cities, towns and other places ==
=== Australia ===
- Brentwood, Western Australia
- Brentwood, South Australia

=== Canada ===
- Brentwood, Calgary, a neighbourhood in Calgary, Alberta
- Brentwood, Nova Scotia
- Brentwood, Ontario, a community within the township of Clearview, Ontario
- Brentwood Bay, British Columbia
- Brentwood Boulevard, Sherwood Park, Alberta
- Brentwood Park (or "Brentwood"), a neighbourhood in Burnaby, British Columbia
- Brentwood Town Centre a.k.a. The Amazing Brentwood, shopping mall in Burnaby, BC

=== New Zealand ===
- Brentwood, a neighborhood in Upper Hutt, Wellington

=== South Africa ===
- Brentwood (House of Assembly of South Africa constituency)

=== United Kingdom ===
- Borough of Brentwood, a local government district
  - Brentwood, Essex, a town in the borough
  - Brentwood and Ongar (UK Parliament constituency)

=== United States ===
- Brentwood, California, a city in the San Francisco Bay Area
- Brentwood, Los Angeles, a district of Los Angeles
  - Brentwood Circle, Los Angeles
  - Brentwood Glen, Los Angeles
- Brentwood, Maryland
  - North Brentwood, Maryland
- Brentwood, a historic district in Holliston, Massachusetts
- Brentwood (McComb, Mississippi), listed on the NRHP in Mississippi
- Brentwood, Missouri
- Brentwood, New Hampshire
- Brentwood, New York
- Brentwood, North Carolina, a Suburb of Raleigh, North Carolina
- Brentwood-Darlington, Portland, Oregon
- Brentwood, Pennsylvania
- Brentwood, Tennessee
- Brentwood, Austin, Texas
- Brentwood, Houston, Texas
- Brentwood (Washington, D.C.), a neighborhood in Washington, D.C.

== Schools ==
=== Australia ===
- Brentwood Secondary College, Glen Waverley, Melbourne

=== Canada ===
- Brentwood College School, Mill Bay, British Columbia

=== United Kingdom ===
- Brentwood County High School, Essex
- Brentwood School, Essex

=== United States ===
- Brentwood Academy, Tennessee
- Brentwood High School (New York)
- Brentwood School (Los Angeles)
- Brentwood Elementary (disambiguation) (Multiple schools)

== Other uses ==
- Brentwood Associates, a long-time USA private equity firm
- Brentwood (CTrain), a light rail station in Calgary, Alberta, Canada
- Brentwood Magazine, a magazine that covers fashion, travel, and entertainment news for Los Angeles
- Brentwood Productions, a film production company founded by actor Gregory Peck

== See also ==
- Brent Wood, Canadian politician
- Brent Woods (1855–1906), American soldier
- Brentwood School (disambiguation)
- Brentwood Park
