= Corny Point =

Corny Point can refer to:

- Corny Point (South Australia), a headland
- Corny Point, South Australia, a settlement east of the headland
- Corny Point Lighthouse, a lighthouse in South Australia
