= Brown Point =

Coordinates: 34°43′56″S 137°28′46″E

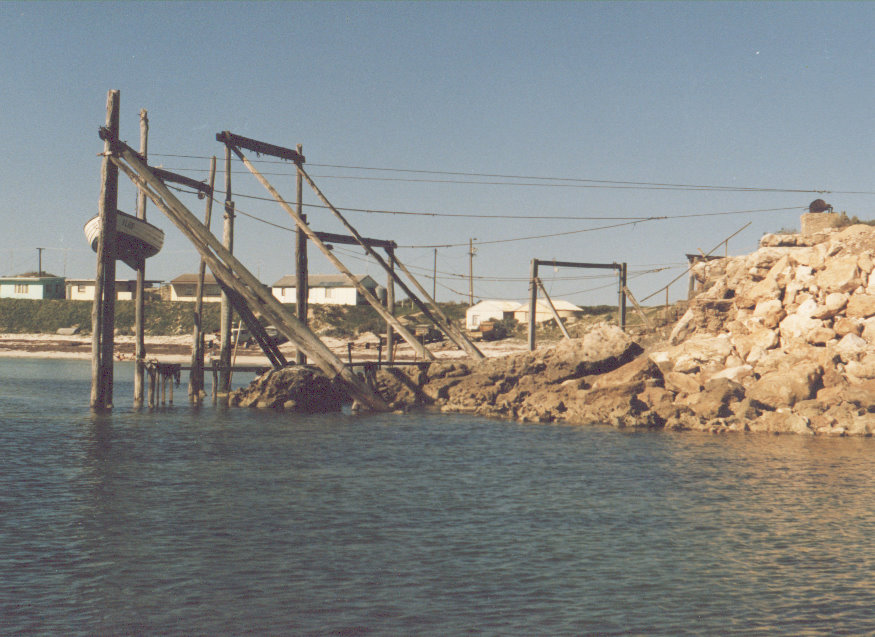
Bluff Beach Davit

Brown Point (also known as Point Brown) is a headland located in the Australian state of South Australia on the west coast of Yorke Peninsula overlooking Hardwicke Bay about 12 kilometres (7.5 mi) west of Minlaton. Since 1999, it has been located within the gazetted locality of Bluff Beach.

== Davits ==
Brown Point with its boat winching system is unique, and is a proven tourist attraction. Photographs of these "Davits" are exhibited nationally in tourist and travel agencies and also on souvenirs and post cards. The manual winching method for raising and lowering boats from cliff to water with the aid of stable uprights, cables and supports, was introduced by George Parsons and Fred Schwarz in the 1920s and it has proved to be a very assured and convenient way of safe guarding a craft in bad weather over the years. Today the fibreglass boat has replaced the clinker or wooden boat on account of easy maintenance etc. and trailers have replaced the winching system.
