= Parsons Beach =

Parsons Beach South Australia
- Coordinates: 34.76°S 137.48°E
- Population: 19 (SAL 2021)
- Established: 1982
- Postcode(s): 5575
- Location: 12 km (7 mi) west of Minlaton
- State electorate(s): Narungga
- Federal division(s): Grey
Localities around Parsons Beach:
| Spencer Gulf | Bluff Beach | Koolywurtie |
| Spencer Gulf | Parsons Beach | Minlaton |
| Spencer Gulf | Minlaton | Minlaton |
- Footnotes: Adjoining localities

Parsons Beach is a locality on the western side of Yorke Peninsula and eastern side of Spencer Gulf in South Australia. There is a small town at the north end of the locality, set behind the sandhills from the beach.

Before 5 September 2017, the village of Parsons Beach was formally the northwestern corner of the locality of Minlaton. On that date, the Government of South Australia declared that Parsons Beach was a separate locality. The name "Parsons Beach" for the subdivision of the village was approved on 27 August 1982 by the Geographical Names Board.
