= Bluff Beach, South Australia =

Bluff Beach South Australia
- Coordinates: 34.732540°S 137.480730°E
- Population: 41 (SAL 2021)
- Established: 1999
- Postcode(s): 5575
- Time zone: ACST (UTC+9:30)
  - Summer (DST): ACST (UTC+10:30)
- Location: 104 km (65 mi) west of Adelaide
- LGA(s): Yorke Peninsula Council
- Region: Yorke and Mid North
- County: Fergusson
- State electorate(s): Narungga
- Federal division(s): Grey
Mean max temp	Mean min temp	Annual rainfall
22.6 °C; 73 °F	10.9 °C; 52 °F	353.9 mm 13.9 in
Suburbs around Bluff Beach:
Spencer Gulf	Port Rickaby	Koolywurtie
Spencer Gulf	Bluff Beach	Koolywurtie; Minlaton
Spencer Gulf	Parsons Beach	Minlaton
- Footnotes: Location; Coordinates; Climate; Adjoining localities

Bluff Beach is a locality in the Australian state of South Australia located on the west coast of Yorke Peninsula overlooking Hardwicke Bay about 104 kilometres (65 miles) west of the state capital of Adelaide.

Its boundaries were created in May 1999 for the “long established name” and includes the former Bluff Beach Shack Site from which the locality’s name was derived.

As of 2015, the majority land use within the locality is agriculture. A secondary land use is conservation which concerns the strip of land immediately adjoining the coastline. A third use of land is residential use along the coastline at the site of the former shack site.

Bluff Beach is located within the federal division of Grey, the state electoral district of Narungga and the local government area of the Yorke Peninsula Council.

== See also ==
- Brown Point
