= Point Souttar, South Australia =

Point Souttar
- Suburb
- Coordinates: 34.897690°S 137.260270°E
- Country: Australia
- State: South Australia
- LGA: Yorke Peninsula Council
- Location: 121 km (75 mi) west of Adelaide city centre
- Established: 1999

Government
  - State electorate: Narungga
  - Federal division: Grey

Population
  - Total: 34 (SAL 2021)
- Time zone: UTC+9:30 (ACST)
  - Summer (DST): UTC+10:30 (ACST)
- Postcode: 5575
- Mean max temp: 21.2 °C (70.2 °F)
- Mean min temp: 11.5 °C (52.7 °F)
- Annual rainfall: 443.7 mm (17.47 in)
Suburbs around Point Souttar
Spencer Gulf	Spencer Gulf	Spencer Gulf
The Pines	Point Souttar	Point Turton; Warooka
The Pines	Warooka	Warooka
- Location; Coordinates; Climate; Adjoining localities

Point Souttar is a locality in the Australian state of South Australia located on the western side of Yorke Peninsula on the portion forming the south coast of Hardwicke Bay in Spencer Gulf about 121 kilometres (75 miles) west of the Adelaide city centre.

Its boundaries were created in May 1999 for the “long established name” which includes the Point Souttar Shack Site. The name was derived from a headland on the coastline which was named after a John Souttar who married Joanna Daly, the daughter of Dominick Daly, the seventh Governor of South Australia.

As of 2015, the majority of land use within the locality is destined for agriculture. A secondary land use is conservation which concerns the strip of land immediately adjoining the coastline as well as part of the Leven Beach Conservation Park located in the locality's northwest corner.

Point Souttar is located within the federal division of Grey, the state electoral district of Narungga and the local government area of the Yorke Peninsula Council.
