= Couch Beach, South Australia =

Couch Beach South Australia
- Coordinates: 34.911880°S 137.176750°E
- Established: 1999
- Postcode(s): 5575
- Time zone: ACST (UTC+9:30)
  - Summer (DST): ACST (UTC+10:30)
- Location: 130 km (81 mi) west of Adelaide
- LGA(s): Yorke Peninsula Council
- Region: Yorke and Mid North
- County: Fergusson
- State electorate(s): Narungga
- Federal division(s): Grey
Mean max temp	Mean min temp	Annual rainfall
21.2 °C; 70 °F	11.5 °C; 53 °F	443.7 mm 17.5 in
Suburbs around Couch Beach:
Spencer Gulf	Spencer Gulf	Spencer Gulf
The Pines	Couch Beach	The Pines
The Pines	The Pines	The Pines
- Footnotes: Location; Coordinates; Climate; Adjoining localities

Couch Beach (formerly Couch's Beach) is a locality in the Australian state of South Australia located on the western side of Yorke Peninsula on the portion forming the south coast of Hardwicke Bay in Spencer Gulf about 130 kilometres (81 miles) west of the state capital of Adelaide.

Its boundaries were created in May 1999 for the “long established name” which was formerly Couch's Beach and which was derived from the Couch family who “owned the land for many years” It is bounded on all sides by the adjoining locality of The Pines.

As of 2015, the majority land use within the locality is agriculture. A secondary use concerns the strip of land overlooking the coastline with Spencer Gulf which is zoned for conservation.

Couch Beach is located within the federal division of Grey, the state electoral district of Narungga and the local government area of the Yorke Peninsula Council.
