= Harry Butler (aviator) =

Henry John 'Harry' Butler
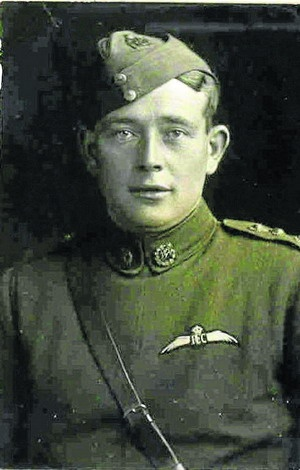
- Captain Harry Butler AFC (ca.1918)
- Born: Henry John 'Harry' Butler; 9 November 1889; Yorketown, South Australia
- Died: 30 July 1924 (aged 34); Adelaide, South Australia
- Resting place: North Road Cemetery, Nailsworth, South Australia
- Monuments: Minlaton, South Australia
- Spouse: Elsa Gibson
- Awards: Air Force Cross
- Aviation career
- Air force: Royal Flying Corps
- Rank: Captain

Henry John 'Harry' Butler AFC (9 November 1889 – 30 July 1924) was a pioneer Australian aviator, Captain and Chief Fight Instructor in the Royal Flying Corps during World War I. When he flew an air mail run from Adelaide across Gulf St Vincent to Minlaton on 6 August 1919, it was the first over-water flight in the Southern Hemisphere carrying air mail and the first flight over a major body of water in the southern hemisphere.

== Early years ==
Butler was born on 9 November 1889 at the main hospital of Yorketown on South Australia's Yorke Peninsula. The son of John James Butler and Sarah Ann Butler née Cook, he grew up on a small farm near Koolywurtie, attending the Koolywurtie Public School. From an early age he showed a strong desire to fly and an aptitude for mechanics; whilst at school he built model aircraft and studied the flying capabilities of his mother's chickens.

== World War I ==
In 1915 he entered the Australian Flying School at Point Cook, Victoria as an engineer, but resigned 2 weeks later. He travelled to England to join the Royal Flying Corps in 1916 to have an opportunity of pilot training, and was commissioned three weeks later. He became Fighting Instructor (Turnberry, Scotland) and Chief Fighting Instructor in the RFC (at Marske Aerodrome in North Yorkshire) and trained over 2,700 pilots. In 1918 he received the Air Force Cross, and when demobilised in 1919, he held the rank of captain.

== Post war ==
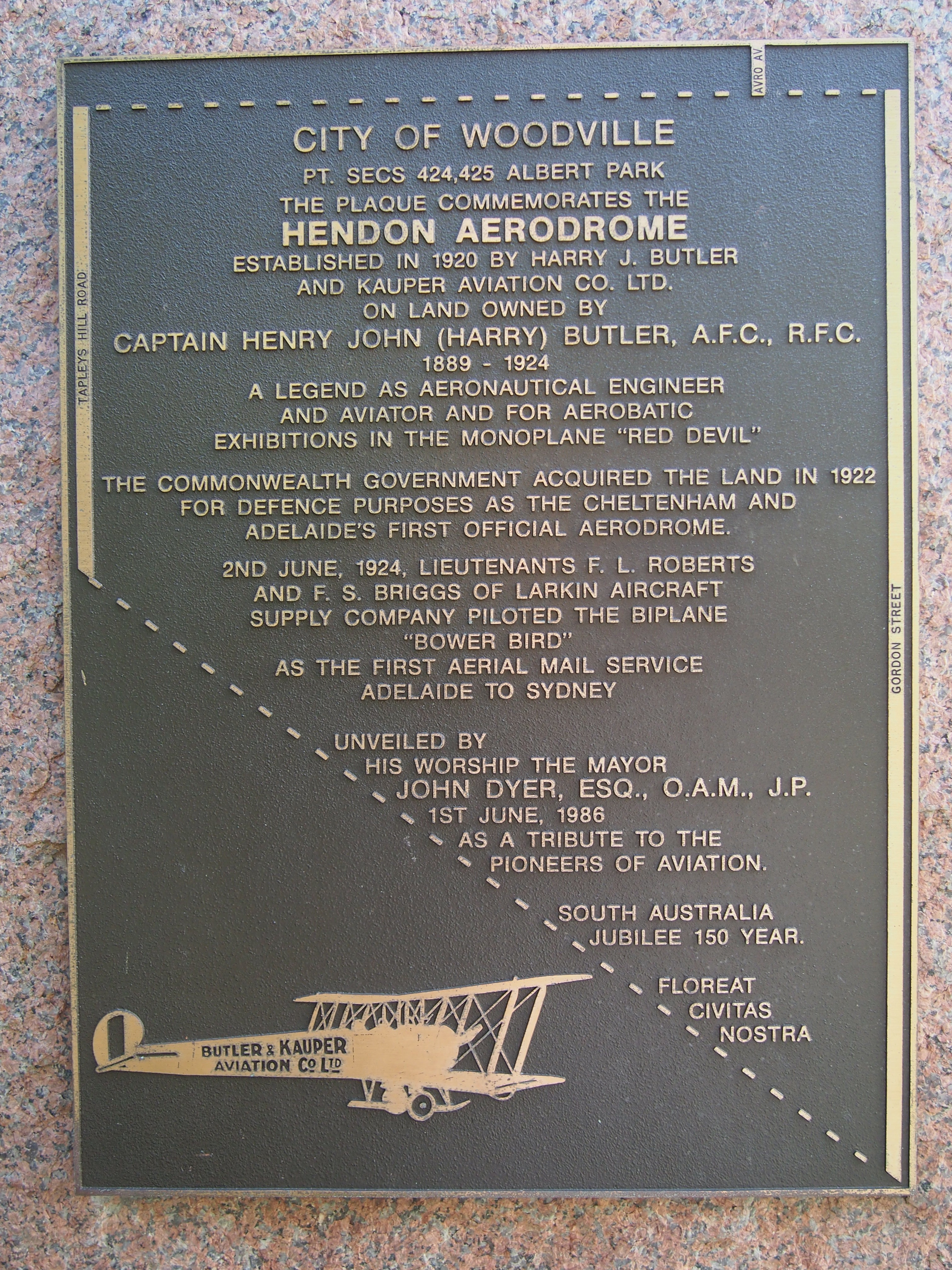
Hendon aerodrome plaque

He returned to Australia with a Bristol M.1C monoplane and an Avro 504K biplane. The monoplane became known as "the Red Devil", and it was in this plane he made the 67-mile (108 km) water crossing from Adelaide to Minlaton in 60 minutes and the return trip on 11 August 1919 in 27 minutes.

Butler established the first airport and the first passenger flight business in South Australia. In partnership with Harry Kauper, he converted the Avro to seat two passengers, and operated as the Captain Harry J. Butler & Kauper Aviation Co. Ltd. initially out of an aerodrome at Northfield. Butler then bought 60 acres (24 ha) of land in part of then-largely rural Albert Park in the Woodville district, and in October 1920 he moved his operations there, establishing the "Hendon" aerodrome, also known as "Captain Butler's Aerodrome". Hendon was later sold to the commonwealth government as the first commonwealth government airport in Adelaide.

Butler was known as the 'Peace Loan flyer' and performed many acrobatic displays over Adelaide to raise money for the Peace Loan and repatriation causes following World War I. He dropped Peace Loan flyers from his plane to promote the loan. He also partook in the first aerial race over the City of Adelaide to raise money for the Peace Loan.

On 21 July 1920 he married Elsa Birch Gibson (later Elsa Hay-Taylor) at St Paul's Anglican Church, Adelaide.

In early 1921 he sold some of his land to Wilkinson, Sands and Wyles Limited, who laid out the new suburb of Hendon. The subdivision sale was successful; however with the novelty of aviation wearing off, the cost of joy flights (5 pounds for 10minutes, more than the average weekly salary for men and more than double that of women) and with some aerial mishaps, Butler was forced to close the company in September 1921. He had previously offered to sell the remainder of his land to the Commonwealth in December 1920. The Department of Defence initially prevaricated, but in July 1922 compulsorily acquired the site, which was used as the first "Adelaide Airport" until 1927, when aviation operations were shifted to Parafield.

On 11 January 1922 Butler was seriously injured when his Avro biplane crashed near Minlaton. He died suddenly of an unexpected cerebral abscess on 30 July 1924, believed related to his earlier crash.

A 1925 portrait of Butler by George A. J. Webb, funded by subscription from the South Australian community, is on loan to (from the AGSA) and held by the Minlaton branch of the National Trust. Other memorials include the 150th jubilee plaque on North Terrace, Adelaide and at Hendon at the site of his former aerodrome, and the 1958 Red Devil memorial hangar housing his bristol M1C monoplane at Minlaton, as well as a 2015 bronze statue at Minlaton.

== Gallery ==
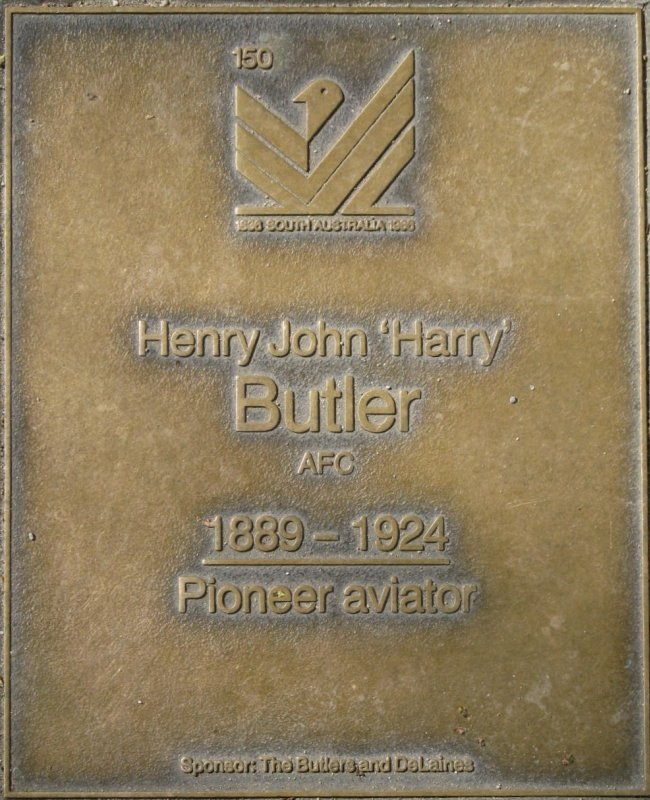
Memorial plaque on Adelaide's Jubilee 150 Walkway

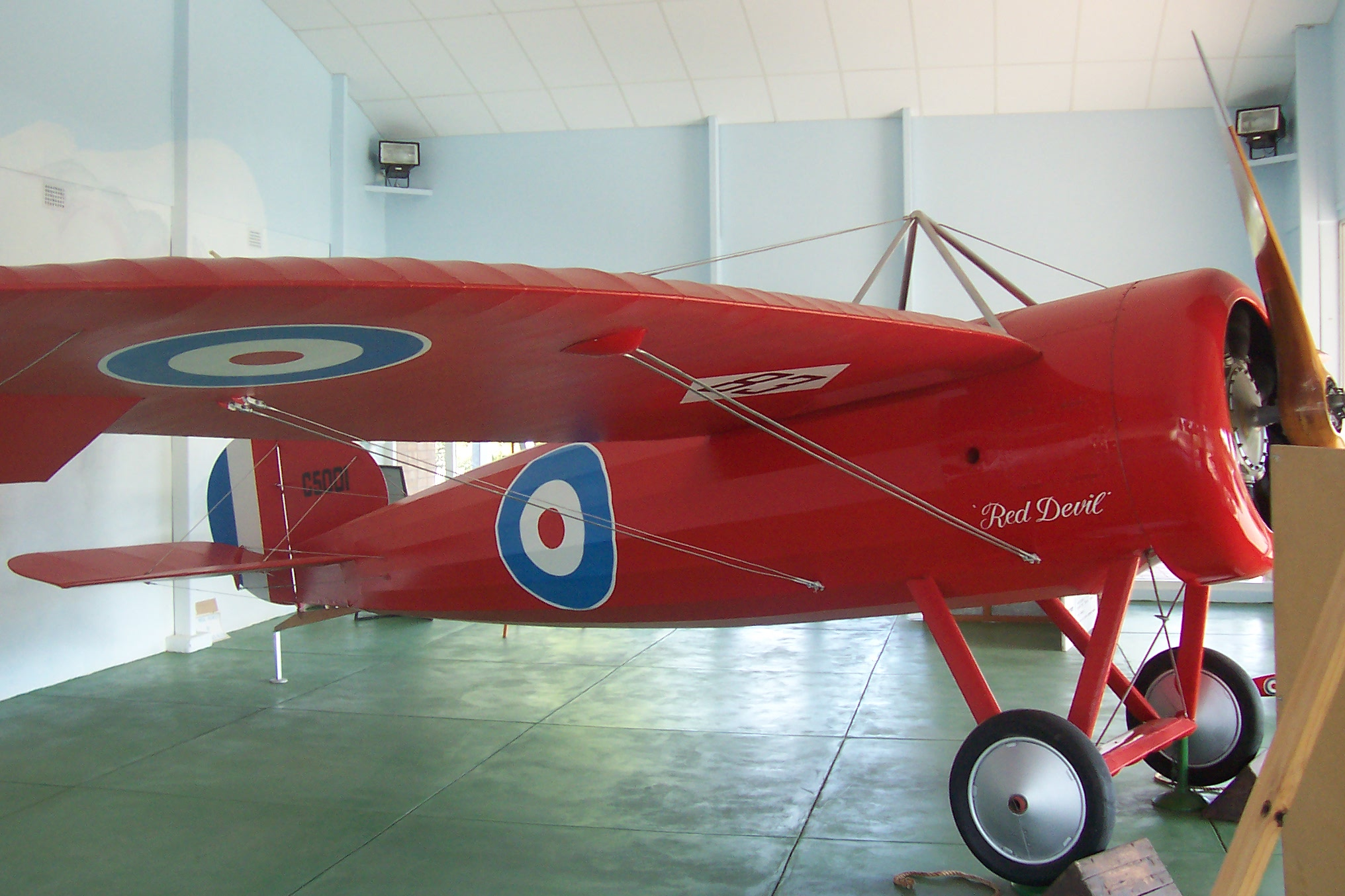
Harry Butler's Red Devil on display in Minlaton

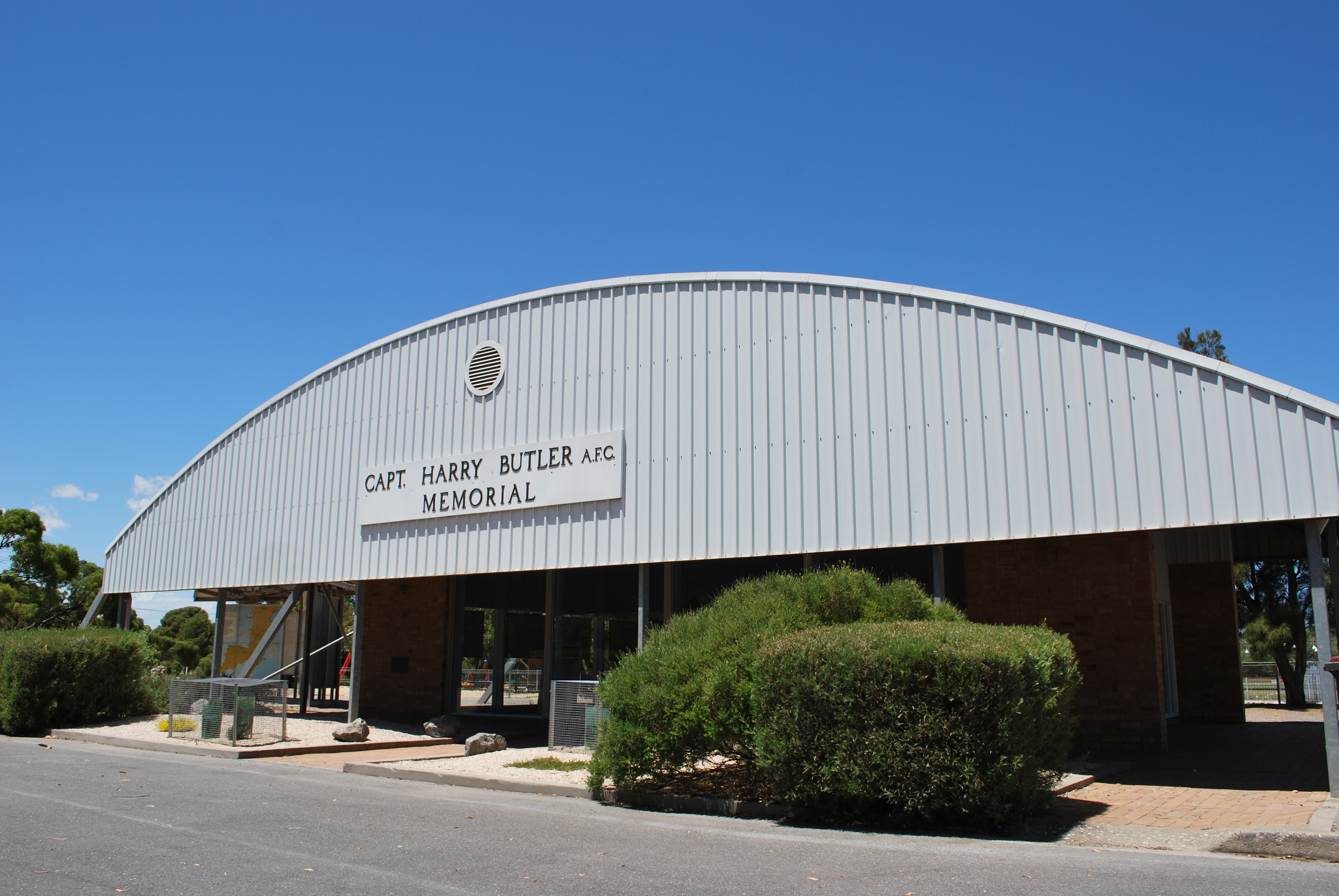
Harry Butler memorial, Minlaton
