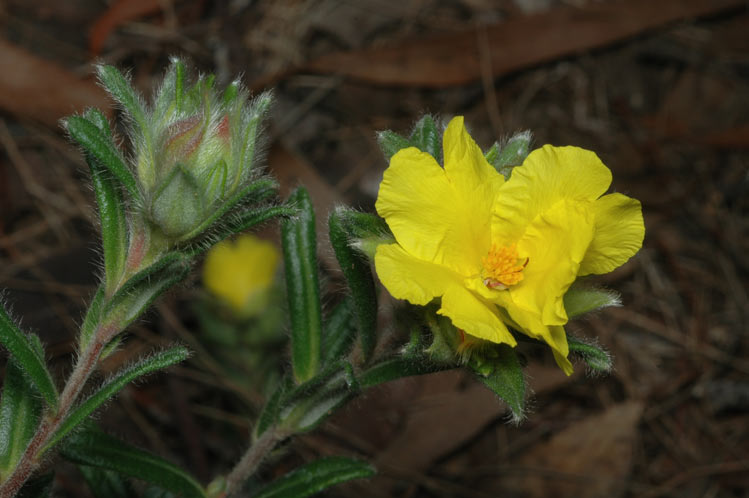
- In the Australian National Botanic Gardens

Scientific classification
- Kingdom: Plantae
- Clade: Tracheophytes
- Clade: Angiosperms
- Clade: Eudicots
- Order: Dilleniales
- Family: Dilleniaceae
- Genus: Hibbertia
- Species: H. platyphylla

Binomial name
- Hibbertia platyphylla Toelken

= Hibbertia platyphylla =

Species of plant

Hibbertia platyphylla is a species of flowering plant in the family Dilleniaceae and is endemic to south-eastern South Australia. It is a shrub with linear stem leaves and yellow flowers arranged singly in leaf axils with ten to fifteen stamens arranged on one side of two carpels.

== Description ==
Hibbertia platyphylla is a shrub that typically grows to a height of 0.3–1 m (1 ft 0 in – 3 ft 3 in) and has hairy foliage. The leaves are usually linear, 6–16 mm (0.24–0.63 in) long, 1.1–3.5 mm (0.043–0.138 in) wide on a petiole 0.8–1.5 mm (0.031–0.059 in) long. The flowers are arranged on the ends of branches with linear to elliptic bracts 2.5–6.0 mm (0.098–0.236 in) long at the base. The five sepals are joined at the base, the outer sepal lobes 4.8–8.5 mm (0.19–0.33 in) long, 2.6–4.3 mm (0.10–0.17 in) wide and the inner sepal lobes 3.7–8 mm (0.15–0.31 in) long, 3.9–5.5 mm (0.15–0.22 in) wide. The five petals are yellow, broadly egg-shaped to heart-shaped, with the narrower end towards the base, 6.6–11.9 mm (0.26–0.47 in) long and there are ten to fifteen stamens fused at the base on one side of the two carpels, each carpel usually with six ovules.

== Taxonomy ==
Hibbertia platyphylla was first formally described in 2010 by Hellmut R. Toelken in the Journal of the Adelaide Botanic Gardens from specimens he collected near the Foul Bay Road in 1994. The specific epithet (platyphylla) means "broad- or flat-leaved".

In the same journal, Toelken changed the name of Hibbertia sericea var. major of John McConnell Black to Hibbertia platyphylla subsp. major and described two new subspecies, the three new names now accepted by the Australian Plant Census:

- Hibbertia platyphylla subsp. halmaturina Toelken has hairy branches, leaves 3.6–7.5 mm (0.14–0.30 in) long and flowers usually in dense clusters from August to December;
- Hibbertia platyphylla subsp. major (J.M.Black) Toelken has hairy branches, leaves usually longer than 8 mm (0.31 in) and flowers in dense clusters mainly from August to November;
- Hibbertia platyphylla sub. platyphylla Toelken has more or less glabrous branches and the flowers single or in loose clusters mainly from August to November.

== Distribution and habitat ==
Subspecies halmaturorum usually grows in mallee and mainly occurs in the western parts of Kangaroo Island. Subspecies major often grows on rocky slopes in woodland on the south-east coast of South Australia but also on the Eyre Peninsula and scattered parts of the central Yorke Peninsula. Subspecies platyphylla often grows near surface limestone and is found on the coast, southern Yorke Peninsula and south-eastern Eyre Peninsula.

== See also ==
- List of Hibbertia species
