= Hardwicke Bay =

Body of water in Australia

- Location in South Australia
- Location: Spencer Gulf, South Australia
- Coordinates: 34°44′21.24″S 137°20′17.48″E
- Type: Bay
- Etymology: Earl of Hardwicke
- Part of: Spencer Gulf
- Basin countries: Australia
- Designation: Marine Parks: Eastern Spencer Gulf; Southern Spencer Gulf
- Max. length: about 45 km (28 mi) (north-south)
- Max. width: about 33 km (21 mi) (NE-SE)
- Max. depth: 29 m (95 ft)
- Islands: Wardang
- Settlements: Corny Point, The Pines, Point Turton, Hardwicke Bay, Bluff Beach, Port Rickaby, Port Victoria (settlements listed from south-west to north east)

Hardwicke Bay is a bay in the Australian state of South Australia located on the west coast of Yorke Peninsula in Spencer Gulf.

== Extent & description ==
Hardwicke Bay is located on the west coast of the Yorke Peninsula within Spencer Gulf in South Australia. It lies between the headland of Corny Point at its southern extremity and the southern end of Wardang Island at its northern extremity. The depth of water within the bay is reported as generally in the range of 14.6 metres (48 ft) to 20.1 metres (66 ft) with the exception of the waters within 5–10 nautical miles (9.3–18.5 km; 5.8–11.5 mi) of the south coast of Wardang Island where the depths are reported as being "very irregular". The bay is reported as being suitable as an anchorage where there is a need to shelter from southerly winds, particularly as most parts of the bay has rocky bottom suitable for anchoring on. The bay’s coastline consists generally of sandy beaches that rise into low sandhills with a woodland cover with occasional rocky headlands. As of 2005, navigation aids within Hardwicke Bay include the Corny Point Lighthouse at the Corny Point headland and a light on Wardang Island.

== History ==
The bay was named after the Earl of Hardwicke by the British navigator, Matthew Flinders on 19 March 1802.

== Settlements and port infrastructure ==
Settlements located on the coast of Hardwicke Bay (from south west to north east) within localities include the following - Corny Point, The Pines, Point Turton, Hardwicke Bay, Bluff Beach, Port Rickaby and Port Victoria. Port infrastructure within the bay consists of jetties and boat ramps. Jetties are located at Point Turton, Port Rickaby and Port Victoria. Boat ramps are located (from the south west to north east) at The Pines, Point Souttar, Point Turton, the settlement of Hardwicke Bay, Port Minlacowie, Bluff Beach, Port Rickaby and Port Victoria.

== Economic use ==
As of 2013, three areas within the southern end of the bay have been zoned under state planning legislation for aquaculture. As of 2011, part of the north end of the bay was proposed for aquaculture under the name of the "Point Pearce prospective aquaculture zone."

== Protected area status ==
Protected areas located within and adjoining the bay’s extent include the following. The Eastern Spencer Gulf Marine Park occupies the northern end of the bay as far south as Wauraltee Beach. The Southern Spencer Gulf Marine Park occupies the southern end of the bay. The Leven Beach Conservation Park adjoins part of the south coast of the bay to the immediate west of the settlement at Point Turton.

== See also ==
- Hardwick (disambiguation)

== Citations and references ==
=== References ===
- Boating Industry Association of South Australia (BIA); South Australia. Department for Environment and Heritage (2005), South Australia's waters an atlas & guide, Boating Industry Association of South Australia, ISBN 978-1-86254-680-6
- "Eastern Spencer Gulf Marine Park Management Plan 2012" (PDF). Department of Environment, Water and Natural Resources (DEWNR). 2012.
- "Southern Spencer Gulf Marine Park Management Plan 2012" (PDF). Department of Environment, Water and Natural Resources (DEWNR). 2012.
- South Australia. Department of Marine and Harbors (DMH) (1985), The Waters of South Australia a series of charts, sailing notes and coastal photographs, Dept. of Marine and Harbors, South Australia, ISBN 978-0-7243-7603-2
- "Map set for the DC of Yorke Peninsula" (PDF). Regional Development Australia Yorke and Mid North (RDA-Y&MN). 2011. Archived from the original (PDF) on 4 March 2016.
