= Carribie Conservation Park =

Protected area in South Australia

- IUCN category III (natural monument or feature)
- Location within South Australia
- Location: South Australia, Corny Point
- Nearest city: Warooka.
- Coordinates: 34°59′40″S 137°3′1″E
- Area: 19 ha (47 acres)
- Established: 11 July 1968
- Governing body: Department for Environment and Water

Carribie Conservation Park is a protected area located in the Yorke Peninsula of South Australia about 32 kilometres (20 miles) west of Warooka in the locality of Corny Point.

The conservation park consists of land in the section 153 of the cadastral unit of the Hundred of Carribie. The land first received protected area status as a fauna reserve proclaimed on 11 July 1968 under the Fauna Conservation Act 1964. On 27 April 1972, the fauna reserve was reconstituted as the Carribie Conservation Park under the National Parks and Wildlife Act 1972. As of 2019, it covered an area of 19 hectares (47 acres).

In 1980, the conservation park was described as follows:

Carribie Conservation Park preserves two vegetation associations representative of the original vegetation of the region. As Yorke Peninsula has been largely cleared of naturally vegetated areas this assumes particular significance... Situated on an undulating sandy plain, Carribie Conservation Park has two co-dominant vegetation associations. The northern part of the park features a dense mallee scrub of Eucalyptus diversifolia, while the southern portion exhibits a woodland of Casuarina stricta and Melaleuca lanceolata... Carribie Conservation Park is a small park largely surrounded by cleared land and as such is susceptible to modification via external pressures...

In 2009, it was reported that 81 native plant species had been recorded within the conservation park's boundaries with an orchid, western daddy-long-legs, being the only species of conservation significance with a listing in South Australia of "rare".

The conservation park is classified as an IUCN Category III protected area. In 1980, it was listed on the now-defunct Register of the National Estate.
