= Wauraltee =

Wauraltee may refer to:

- Aboriginal name for Wardang Island in Australia
- Former name for the town of Port Victoria, South Australia
- Hundred of Wauraltee, a cadastral unit in Australia
- Wauraltee, South Australia, a locality
