= Pterostylis erythroconcha =

Red shell orchid

Scientific classification
- Kingdom: Plantae
- Clade: Tracheophytes
- Clade: Angiosperms
- Clade: Monocots
- Order: Asparagales
- Family: Orchidaceae
- Subfamily: Orchidoideae
- Tribe: Cranichideae
- Genus: Pterostylis
- Species: P. erythroconcha

Binomial name
- Pterostylis erythroconcha M.A.Clem. & D.L.Jones

Synonyms
- Diplodium erythroconchum (M.A.Clem. & D.L.Jones) D.L.Jones & M.A.Clem.

Species of orchid

Pterostylis erythroconcha, commonly known as the red shell orchid, is a species of orchid endemic to South Australia. As with similar orchids, the flowering plants differ from those which are not flowering. The non-flowering plants have a rosette of leaves but the flowering plants have a single flower with leaves on the flowering spike. This greenhood has a white and green flower with reddish brown markings and a long, fleshy, curved labellum.

== Description ==
Pterostylis erythroconcha is a terrestrial, perennial, deciduous, herb with an underground tuber and when not flowering, a rosette of between three and ten egg-shaped leaves. Each leaf is 60–150 mm (2–6 in) long and 3–8 mm (0.1–0.3 in) wide. Flowering plants have a single flower 25–30 mm (1–1 in) long and 9–11 mm (0.4–0.4 in) wide borne on a flowering stem 60–150 mm (2–6 in) high. The flowers are translucent white with reddish-brown stripes and markings. The dorsal sepal and petals are fused, forming a hood or "galea" over the column. The dorsal sepal curves forward with sharp point or a thread-like tip 1–2 mm (0.04–0.08 in) long. The lateral sepals are held closely against the galea, have an erect, thread-like tip 25–30 mm (0.98–1.2 in) long and a broad, flat sinus with a small notch between their bases. The labellum is 16–20 mm (0.6–0.8 in) long, about 4 mm (0.2 in) wide, thick, fleshy and reddish-brown protruding prominently above the sinus. Flowering occurs from April to August.

== Taxonomy and naming ==
Pterostylis erythroconcha was first formally described in 1985 by Mark Clements and David Jones from a specimen collected near Corny Point. The description was published in the fourth edition of Flora of South Australia. The specific epithet (erythroconcha) is derived from the Ancient Greek words erythros meaning "red" and konche meaning "snail".

== Distribution and habitat ==
The red shell orchid grows on calcareous sand and limestone, sometimes forming large colonies, usually near the coast, in mallee. It is found in the south-east of South Australia.
