= Leven Beach Conservation Park =

Protected area in South Australia

- IUCN category III (natural monument or feature)
- Location within South Australia
- Location: South Australia
- Nearest city: Point Turton
- Coordinates: 34°54′25″S 137°11′59″E
- Area: 470 ha (1,200 acres)
- Established: 23 June 1988
- Governing body: Department for Environment and Water

Leven Beach Conservation Park is a protected area in the Australian state of South Australia, located on the north coast of the lower part of Yorke Peninsula within the boundaries of the gazetted localities of Point Souttar and The Pines about 10 kilometres (6.2 miles) west north-west of Point Turton.

The conservation park was proclaimed in 1988 for the purpose of conserving ‘sheoak woodland and potentially provides habitat for a nationally endangered species of butterfly, the Yellowish Sedge-skipper Butterfly’.

The conservation park is classified as an IUCN Category III protected area.
