= Marske Aerodrome =

Former military aerodrome in Marske, North Yorkshire, England

Marske Aerodrome
- Marske-by-the-Sea, North Yorkshire in England
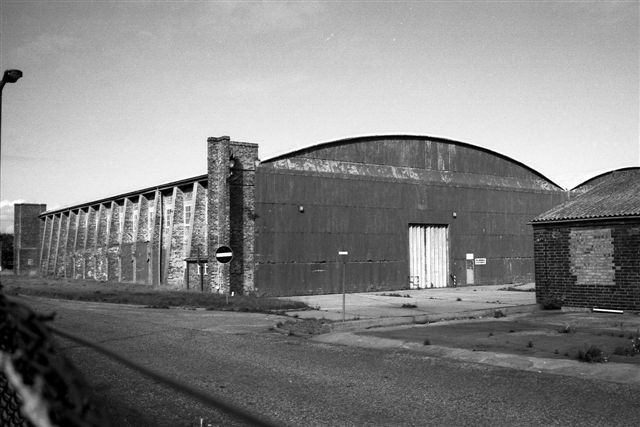
- One of the large hangars at Marske Aerodrome

Site information
- Owner: Air Ministry
- Operator: Royal Flying Corps; Royal Air Force

Location
- Location in North Yorkshire
- Coordinates: 54°35′51″N 01°02′06″W
- Grid reference: NZ624225
- Area: 1,900 square yards (1,600 m^{2})

Site history
- Built: 1 November 1917
- In use: 1920 (Military use)
- Fate: Demolished, partially converted to housing

Airfield information
- Identifiers: IATA: None, ICAO: None
Runways
Direction	Length and surface
	Grass

Marske Aerodrome was a First World War-era airfield used by the Royal Flying Corps, and later by the Royal Air Force, between 1917 and 1920. The aerodrome was just to the west of the village of Marske-by-the-Sea in Yorkshire (North Yorkshire), England. Marske aerodrome hosted air gunnery schools and trained pilots in tactics and methods of aerial combat so that they could be deployed to the front. Marske is known for being the aerodrome where W. E. Johns, author of the Biggles books, undertook his training, as well as being noted for some of the flying instructors who were famous among the aircrew cadre.

== History ==
Whilst some civilian landing flights had been tested out on the beach below Marske, the aerodrome at Marske-by-the-Sea opened inland just west of the village on 25 June 1910. With the outbreak of the First World War, the site was surveyed for possible military use, however, it was not until the summer of 1917 that a spur line was laid near Ryehills Farm at Marske from the railway line between Redcar and Saltburn-by-the-Sea. This allowed for easy transport in of men and materials to build the aerodrome. The Royal Flying Corps (RFC) base opened officially on 1 November 1917, with the first occupants being No. 4 (Auxiliary) School of Aerial Gunnery. The site measured 1,000 yards (910 m) by 900 yards (820 m) and was furnished with 17 Bessonneau hangars along Green Lane at the west side, and four permanent sheds on the southern side each measuring 170 feet (52 m) by 200 feet (61 m).

The air-to-ground gunnery range was at the east end of the site on the cliff edge. Telegraph wires to the north and east were lowered to enable low flying. However, training by the No. 4 School was orientated towards pilots, whereas the back-seat gunners, were trained at No. 3 School in New Romney.

In April 1918, just five days after the RFC became the Royal Air Force (RAF), both Harry Butler and W. E. Johns were posted in to No. 2 Aerial Gunnery School at Marske. During this period, the school started using the M.1c Bristol monoplane, which was delivered to Marske via the rail link.

Not long after he was credited with shooting down the Red Baron, Captain Roy Brown was posted into Marske as a flying instructor. However, within three months, he had a serious accident which kept him in hospital until the First World War was over. Between April and August 1918, the 25th Aero Squadron of the United States Army Air Service, moved into Marske from Ayr to undertake training. They later deployed to France in August of the same year.

On 29 September 1918, the commanding officer of one of the air training schools died when his aircraft plunged 1,000 feet (300 m) into the sea. Major Aizlewood had been practising aerial manoeuvres which were being recorded for a training film. The inquiry determined that his flying clothes became caught in the aircraft's controls. He was buried in the graveyard of St Germain's Church in Marske, overlooking the sea where he had crashed.

The last school was closed in November 1919, however, the base was retained until 1920 with the site being listed as available for flying but having no facilities to cater for civilian traffic. During the railway strike of 1919, aircraft were used to deliver mail. Marske was one of the aerodromes used during the dispute. The site was re-used during the Second World War, but by the Royal Artillery, rather than the RAF. However, two pillboxes were constructed to protect the aerodrome, which was manned by regular soldiers from the Argyll & Sutherland Highlanders, the Green Howards and the South Staffordshire Regiment. This was believed to have been in case the RAF needed to use the site as an emergency ground, and to prevent it being used by enemy forces. The four permanent hangars were demolished in the 1990s.

In the early 1990s, part of the south-east corner of the site was converted into a housing estate named 'Barnes Wallis Way', after the famous wartime engineer Barnes Wallis. Its roads are named after aircraft from the Second World War, even though the site was not in use for the Air Force during that period.

St Mark's Church in Marske, has an aviator's window which commemorates the death of a civilian flyer in 1912, but also has images and a dedication to the young men who trained at the aerodrome nearby.

== Based units ==
Unit	Dates	Aircraft	Notes	Ref
No. 2 Fighting School	29 May 1918 – November 1919	Sopwith Camel		
No. 2 School of Aerial Fighting & Gunnery	6 May 1918 – 29 May 1918	Sopwith Camel, Sopwith Dolphin, Sopwith Triplane	Disbanded in May 1918 to become No. 2 Fighting School	
No. 4 (Auxiliary) School of Aerial Fighting & Gunnery	1 November 1917 – 6 May 1918	Airco DH.9, Sopwith Dolphin	Disbanded in May 1918 to become No. 2 Fighting School	
No. 8 Wing (headquarters)	December 1918 – April 1920			
25th Aero Squadron	23 April – 7 August 1918	Royal Aircraft Factory S.E.5		

== Notable personnel ==
- Roy Brown (RAF officer)
- Captain Harry Butler
- Bert Hinkler, attended the gunnery school at Marske
- Captain W. E. Johns, author of the Biggles books
- Captain Stearne Tighe Edwards
