= Corny Point Lighthouse =

Lighthouse in Spencer Gulf, South Australia

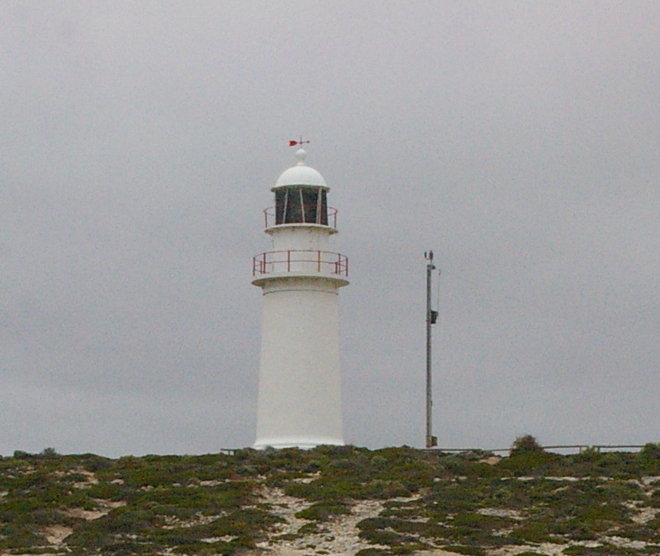
- Location: Corny Point; South Australia; Australia
- Coordinates: 34°53′47.7″S 137°00′38.2″E

Tower
- Constructed: 1882
- Construction: limestone tower
- Automated: 1920
- Height: 16 metres (52 ft)
- Shape: cylindrical tower with double balcony and lantern
- Markings: white tower, lantern and dome, red lantern rail
- Power source: mains electricity
- Operator: Australian Maritime Safety Authority
- Heritage: state heritage place since 24 July 1980

Light
- Focal height: 30 metres (98 ft)
- Lens: 3rd order Chance Brothers Fresnel lens
- Intensity: 60,000 cd
- Range: 19 nautical miles (35 km; 22 mi)
- Characteristic: Four white flashes every 20 seconds; red flashes shown over rocks to the southwest

Corny Point Lighthouse is a lighthouse located in Spencer Gulf, South Australia, on the headland known as Corny Point about 7.5 kilometres (4.7 mi) west of the town of Corny Point.

It was commissioned in March 1882 to assist southbound shipping to avoid hazards on the west coast of the peninsula south of Corny Point and to determine during darkness where Hardwicke Bay lies if required as a place of shelter from the weather. It was converted to automatic operation in 1920 and along with the demolition of the lighthouse keeper accommodation. The lighthouse has been listed on the South Australian Heritage Register since 24 July 1980.

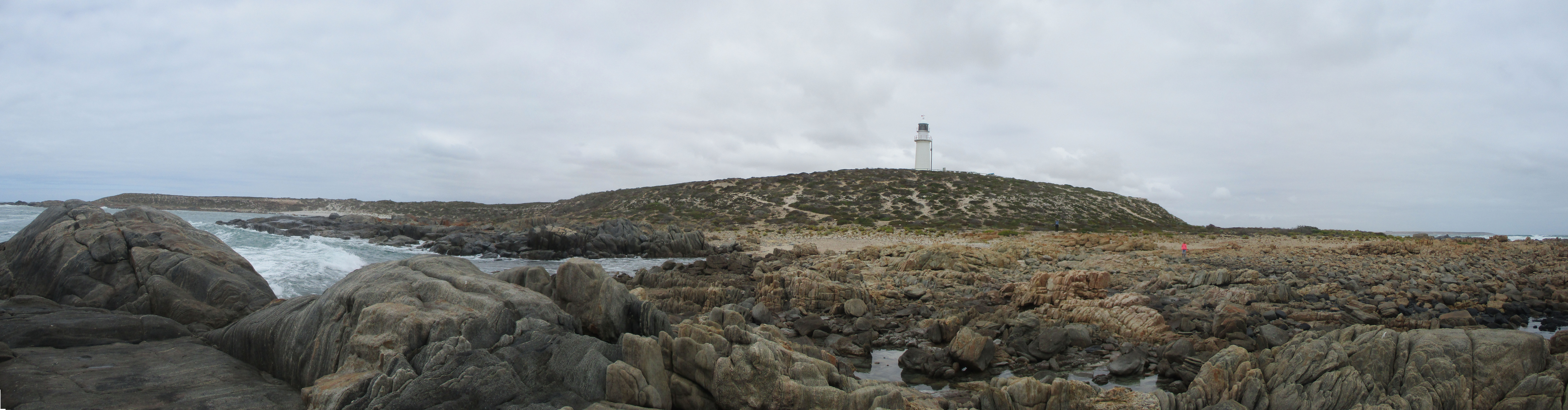
Corny Point Panorama from Beach

== See also ==
- List of lighthouses in Australia
