= Hardwicke Bay, South Australia =

Hardwicke Bay South Australia
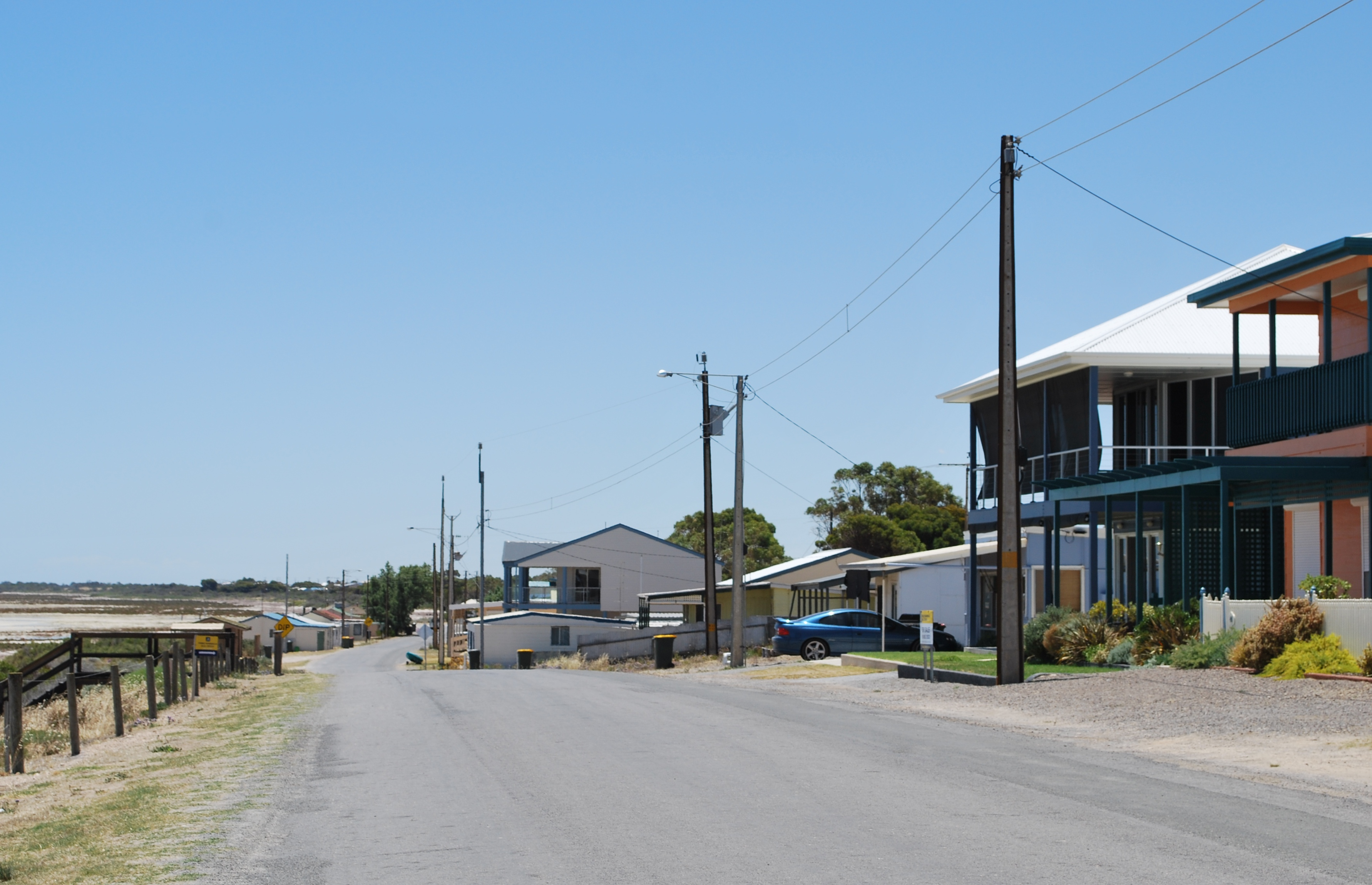
- A seaside street in Hardwicke Bay

- Coordinates: 34.892050°S 137.458150°E
- Population: 149 (SAL 2021)
- Established: 1999
- Postcode(s): 5575
- Time zone: ACST (UTC+9:30)
  - Summer (DST): ACST (UTC+10:30)
- Location: 104.1 km (65 mi) W of Adelaide city centre; 13 km (8 mi) S of Warooka
- LGA(s): Yorke Peninsula Council
- Region: Yorke and Mid North
- County: Fergusson
- State electorate(s): Narungga
- Federal division(s): Grey
Mean max temp	Mean min temp	Annual rainfall
21.2 °C; 70 °F	11.5 °C; 53 °F	444.9 mm 17.5 in
Localities around Hardwicke Bay:
Spencer Gulf	Brentwood	Brentwood
Spencer Gulf	Hardwicke Bay	Yorketown
Warooka	Warooka	Yorketown
- Footnotes: Climate; Coordinates; Adjoining localities

Hardwicke Bay is a locality in the Australian state of South Australia located on the west coast of Yorke Peninsula overlooking the bay also named Hardwicke Bay about 104 kilometres (65 miles) west of the Adelaide city centre and about 9 kilometres (5.6 miles) north of the town of Warooka.

The boundaries of the locality were created on 27 May 1999 for the “long established name” and including the two shack sites known respectively as the “original shack site” and the “Moorowie Shack Site.”

Hardwicke Bay is located within the federal Division of Grey, the state electoral district of Narungga and the local government area of the Yorke Peninsula Council.

The majority land use within the locality is “primary production.”

== See also ==
- List of cities and towns in South Australia
- Hardwick (disambiguation)
