= Wauraltee, South Australia =

Wauraltee
- Suburb
- Coordinates: 34°35′14″S 137°33′20″E
- Country: Australia
- State: South Australia
- Region: Yorke and Mid North
- LGA: Yorke Peninsula Council
- Location: 102 km (63 mi) W of Adelaide; 25 km (16 mi) SW of Maitland
- Established: 27 May 1999

Government
  - State electorate: Narungga
  - Federal division: Grey

Population
  - Total: 69 (SAL 2021)
- Time zone: UTC+9:30 (ACST)
  - Summer (DST): UTC+10:30 (ACST)
- Postcode: 5573
- Mean max temp: 21.9 °C (71.4 °F)
- Mean min temp: 11.3 °C (52.3 °F)
- Annual rainfall: 504.0 mm (19.84 in)
Suburbs around Wauraltee
Spencer Gulf	Port Victoria; Urania	Sandilands
Spencer Gulf	Wauraltee	Sandilands; Curramulka
Spencer Gulf	Port Rickaby; Koolywurtie; Curramulka	Curramulka

Wauraltee is a locality in the Australian state of South Australia located on the Yorke Peninsula about 102 kilometres (63 mi) west of the state capital of Adelaide and about 25 kilometres (16 mi) south-west of the municipal seat of Maitland.

Wauraltee's boundaries were created on 27 May 1999 and given the “local established name” which is derived from a local aboriginal word.

Wauraltee is located within the federal division of Grey, the state electoral district of Narungga and the local government area of the Yorke Peninsula Council.

A rural area with a very small population (only a few dozen residents). Farming is the main activity, especially growing grains, just like in most parts of the peninsula.
