= White Hut, South Australia =

Locality in South Australia

White Hut
- Coordinates: 35.044330°S 137.015070°E
- Country: Australia
- State: South Australia
- LGA: Yorke Peninsula Council
- Location: 145 km (90 mi) west of Adelaide
- Established: 1999

Government
  - State electorate: Narungga
  - Federal division: Grey

Population
  - Total: 12 (SAL 2021)
- Time zone: UTC+9:30 (ACST)
  - Summer (DST): UTC+10:30 (ACST)
- Postcode: 5575
- Mean max temp: 21.2 °C (70.2 °F)
- Mean min temp: 11.5 °C (52.7 °F)
- Annual rainfall: 443.7 mm (17.47 in)
Localities around White Hut
	Corny Point	Warooka
Spencer Gulf	White Hut	Warooka
	Marion Bay	Marion Bay
- Distances; Coordinates; Climate; Adjoining localities

White Hut is a locality in the Australian state of South Australia. It is on the west coast of Yorke Peninsula immediately adjoining Spencer Gulf about 145 kilometres (90 miles) west of the state capital of Adelaide. Its boundaries were created in May 1999. As of 2014, the majority of the land within the locality is zoned as "water protection" to protect groundwater basins present at "shallow depths" and to encourage land use such as “broadacre cropping, grazing, and wind farm and ancillary development". White Hut is within the federal division of Grey, the state electoral district of Narungga and the local government area of the Yorke Peninsula Council.

== See also ==
- List of cities and towns in South Australia
