= Brentwood School =

Brentwood School may refer to:

- Brentwood College School, Mill Bay, British Columbia, Canada
- Brentwood School, Essex, England
- Brentwood School (Los Angeles), California, United States
- Brentwood School (Sandersville), Georgia, United States
- Brentwood Secondary College, Glen Waverley, Victoria, Australia
