= Brentwood, South Australia =

Brentwood South Australia
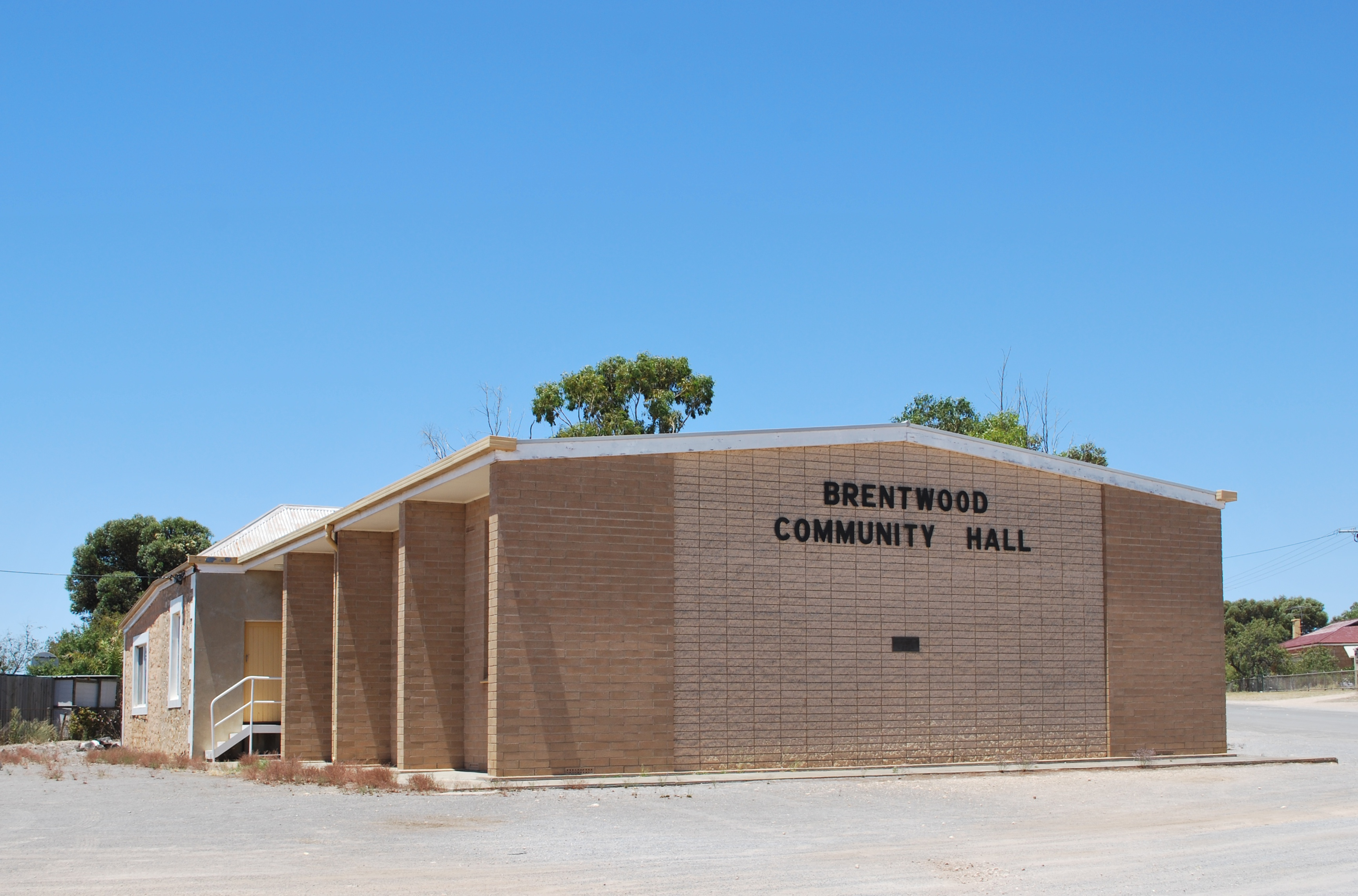
- Community hall

- Coordinates: 34°51′43″S 137°29′46″E
- Population: 71 (SAL 2021)
- Postcode(s): 5575
- Location: 212 km (132 mi) W of Adelaide; 110 km (68 mi) S of Kadina; 14 km (9 mi) SW of Minlaton
- LGA(s): Yorke Peninsula Council
- Region: Yorke and Mid North
- County: Fergusson
- State electorate(s): Narungga
- Federal division(s): Grey
Localities around Brentwood:
Spencer Gulf	Minlaton	Minlaton
Spencer Gulf	Brentwood	Minlaton
Spencer Gulf	Hardwicke Bay; Yorketown	Yorketown
- Footnotes: Adjoining localities

Brentwood is a locality on the Yorke Peninsula in South Australia. The town is located in the Yorke Peninsula Council local government area, 212 kilometres (132 mi) west of the state capital, Adelaide by road (103 kilometres (64 mi) as the crow flies). It is on the Yorke Highway, between Minlaton and Hardwicke Bay.

The small town is not driven by business, and functions as a residential area for people who work in nearby towns or on local farms, as well as for retirees.

== See also ==
- List of cities and towns in South Australia
- Brentwood (disambiguation)
