= The Pines, South Australia =

The Pines South Australia
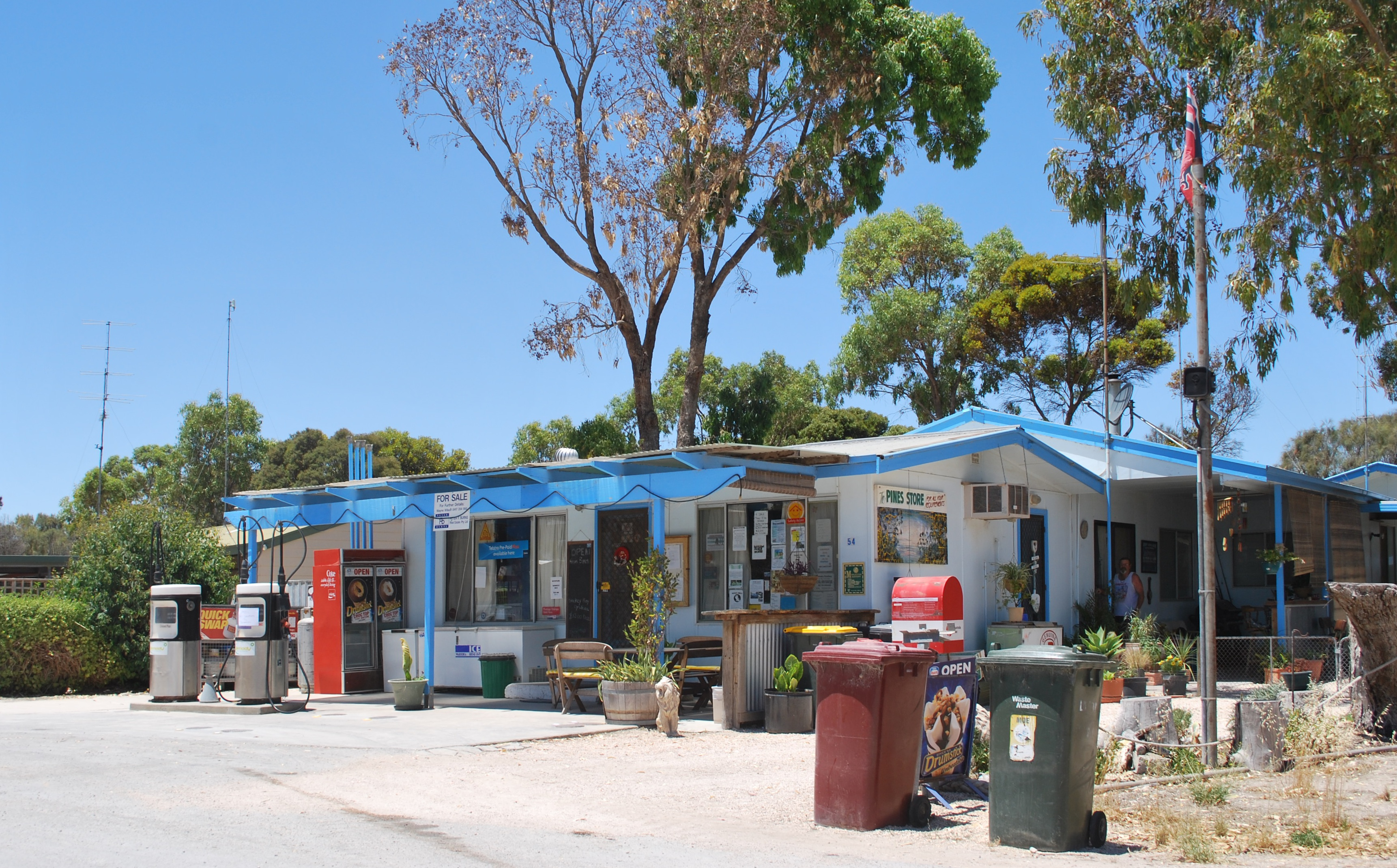
- The general store at The Pines

- Coordinates: 34.913860°S 137.166970°E
- Population: 135 (SAL 2021)
- Established: 1999
- Postcode(s): 5575
- Time zone: ACST (UTC+9:30)
  - Summer (DST): ACST (UTC+10:30)
- Location: 131 km (81 mi) west of Adelaide city centre
- LGA(s): Yorke Peninsula Council
- State electorate(s): Narungga
- Federal division(s): Grey
Mean max temp	Mean min temp	Annual rainfall
21.2 °C; 70 °F	11.5 °C; 53 °F	443.7 mm 17.5 in
Suburbs around The Pines:
Spencer Gulf	Spencer Gulf; Couch Beach	Spencer Gulf
Corny Point	The Pines	Point Souttar; Warooka
Warooka	Warooka	Warooka
- Footnotes: Location; Coordinates; Climate; Adjoining localities

The Pines is a locality in the Australian state of South Australia located on the western side of Yorke Peninsula on the portion forming the south coast of Hardwicke Bay in Spencer Gulf about 131 kilometres (81 miles) west of the Adelaide city centre.

== History ==
Its boundaries were created in May 1999 for the “long established name” which includes the Collin Beach Shack Site. The name was first used in 1972 for a private sub-division developed by a James N Faggoter of land owned by him in the cadastral unit of the Hundred of Para Wurlie after received approval for the name from the Geographical Names Board in 1970. A result of the creation of boundaries in 1999 was that The Pines fully enclosed the adjoining locality of Couch Beach on all sides except the coastline.

== Land use ==
As of 2015, the land use within the locality is dominated between agriculture and land zoned as “water protection” in order to protect groundwater basins present at “shallow depths” and to encourage land use such as “broadacre cropping, grazing, and wind farm and ancillary development.” A third land use is residential which concerns the land associated with the original sub-division and the former shack site both located near the coastline with Spencer Gulf. A fourth land use within the locality is conservation which concerns the strip of land immediately adjoining the coastline as well as the Leven Beach Conservation Park located in the locality's northeast corner.

The Pines is located within the federal division of Grey, the state electoral district of Narungga and the local government area of the Yorke Peninsula Council.

== See also ==
- The Pines (disambiguation)
