= Thidna Conservation Park =

Protected area in South Australia

- IUCN category VI (protected area with sustainable use of natural resources)
- Location within South Australia
- Location: South Australia, Corny Point
- Nearest city: Corny Point
- Coordinates: 34°59′31″S 136°59′43″E
- Area: 8.57 km^{2} (3.31 sq mi)
- Established: 17 December 2017
- Governing body: Department for Environment and Water

Thidna Conservation Park is a protected area located in the Australian state of South Australia on the Yorke Peninsula in the locality of Corny Point about 45 kilometres (28 mi) west of the state capital of Adelaide and about 60 kilometres (37 mi) south-west of the municipal seat of Maitland.

The conservation park occupies land in Allotment 102 in Deposited Plan 95664 within the cadastral unit of the Hundred of Carribie. It was proclaimed on 19 December 2017 under the National Parks and Wildlife Act 1972. On the same day, a separate proclamation ensured that “certain existing and future rights of entry, prospecting, exploration or mining” permitted under the state's Mining Act 1971 and Petroleum and Geothermal Energy Act 2000 would apply to the extent of the conservation park. As of 2018, it covered an area of 8.57 square kilometres (3.31 sq mi).

Its name is derived from an Aboriginal name meaning 'foot' which is considered as an "appropriate" name based on the location of the conservation park on the southern end of the Yorke Peninsula. The meaning of ‘Thidna’ was supplied by the Point Pearce Aboriginal Community and was subsequently approved by the Geographical Names Advisory Committee in 1993.

An announcement made on 30 December 2017 by Ian Hunter, the then Minister for Sustainability, Environment and Conservation in the South Australian government described the conservation park as follows:

The new Thidna Conservation Park, between Corny Point and Daly Head on southern Yorke Peninsula, protects 857 ha of remnant native vegetation in a landscape that has been heavily cleared for agriculture.

The conservation park is classified as an IUCN Category VI protected area.

== See also ==
- Protected areas of South Australia
