= Koolywurtie, South Australia =

Koolywurtie South Australia
- Coordinates: 34°38′43″S 137°38′22″E
- Population: 101 (2021 census)
- Established: 1999
- Postcode(s): 5575
- Time zone: ACST (UTC+9:30)
  - Summer (DST): ACST (UTC+10:30)
- Location: 93 km (58 mi) W of Adelaide; 20 km (12 mi) S of Maitland
- LGA(s): Yorke Peninsula Council
- Region: Yorke and Mid North
- County: Fergusson
- State electorate(s): Narungga
- Federal division(s): Grey
| Mean max temp | Mean min temp | Annual rainfall |
| 22.6 °C; 73 °F | 9.4 °C; 49 °F | 353.7 mm 13.9 in |
Suburbs around Koolywurtie:
| Wauraltee | Wauraltee | Wauraltee |
| Port Rickaby; Bluff Beach | Koolywurtie | Curramulka |
| Bluff Beach | Minlaton | Curramulka |
- Footnotes: Adjoining localities

Koolywurtie is a locality in the Australian state of South Australia located on the Yorke Peninsula about 93 kilometres (58 mi) west of the state capital of Adelaide and about 20 kilometres (12 mi) south of the municipal seat of Maitland.

Koolywurtie's boundaries were created on 27 May 1999 and given the “local established name” which is derived from the local aboriginal word used for some "nearby native wells."

The 2021 Australian census which was conducted in August 2021 reports that Koolywurtie had a population of 101 people.

Koolywurtie is located within the federal division of Grey, the state electoral district of Narungga and the local government area of the Yorke Peninsula Council.
