= Brentwood, Nova Scotia =

Community in Nova Scotia, Canada

Coordinates: 45°12′43.33″N 63°16′50.03″W

Brentwood in Nova Scotia

Brentwood is an unincorporated community in the Canadian province of Nova Scotia, located in Colchester County.
