= Foul Bay, South Australia =

Foul Bay
- Coordinates: 35.197360°S 137.1981°E
- Country: Australia
- State: South Australia
- Region: Yorke and Mid North
- LGA: Yorke Peninsula Council
- Location: 130 km (81 mi) west of Adelaide
- Established: 1999

Government
  - State electorate: Narungga
  - Federal division: Grey

Population
  - Total: 40 (SAL 2021)
- Time zone: UTC+9:30 (ACST)
  - Summer (DST): UTC+10:30 (ACST)
- Postcode: 5577
- County: Fergusson
- Mean max temp: 23.1 °C (73.6 °F)
- Mean min temp: 15 °C (59 °F)
- Annual rainfall: 432.8 mm (17.04 in)
Localities around Foul Bay
Warooka	Warooka	Warooka
Marion Bay	Foul Bay	Warooka
	Investigator Strait
- Distances; Coordinates; Climate; Adjoining localities

Foul Bay is a locality in the Australian state of South Australia located on the south coast of Yorke Peninsula immediately adjoining Investigator Strait about 130 kilometres (81 miles) west of the state capital of Adelaide.

It was formally established in May 1999, with its name deriving from the Foul Bay Shack Site on South Coast Road. It also incorporates the pre-existing "Old Wheel Inn Shack Site" and the "Point Davenport Shack Site". A government town named Nugent was surveyed at the end of Nugent Road, near the Point Davenport site, in July 1880; however, it was never developed and was declared to have ceased to exist on 11 June 1925. In 2012, a portion of Foul Bay was added to Warooka.

As of 2014, the majority land use within the locality was “primary production.”

Foul Bay is located within the federal division of Grey, the state electoral district of Narungga and the local government area of the Yorke Peninsula Council. 56.4% are male and 43.6% are female.

== See also ==
- List of cities and towns in South Australia
