= Brentwood Elementary =

Brentwood Elementary may refer to:

- Brentwood Elementary School, Spokane, Washington
- Wake County Public School System, Raleigh, North Carolina
- Brentwood Science Magnet Elementary School, Los Angeles, California
- Brentwood Elementary School (Sarasota, FL) Sarasota, FL
