= Corny Point (South Australia) =

Corny Point South Australia
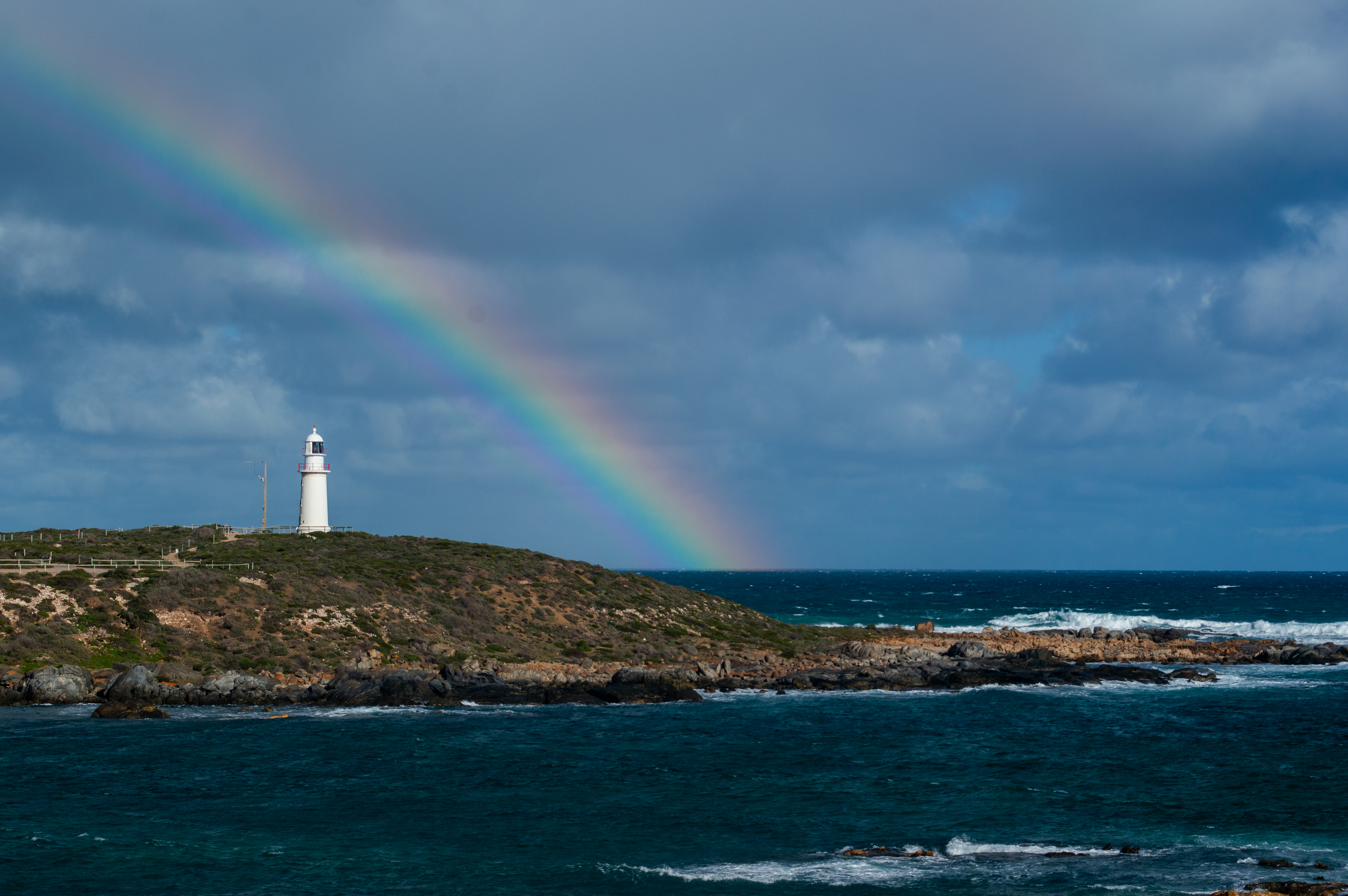
- Corny point headland

- Coordinates: 34°53′47″S 137°0′34″E
- Elevation: 16 m (52 ft)
- Location: 37 km (23 mi) north west of Warooka
- LGA(s): Yorke Peninsula Council
- State electorate(s): Narungga
Localities around Corny Point:
Spencer Gulf	Spencer Gulf	Spencer Gulf
Spencer Gulf	Corny Point	Yorke Peninsula
Spencer Gulf	Yorke Peninsula	Yorke Peninsula

Corny Point is a headland located on the west coast of the Yorke Peninsula in South Australia about 37 kilometres (23 miles) north west of the town of Warooka. The point is described as being "a sloping rocky double projection..." where the "coast on the N[orth] side is low and sandy whereas the coast on the S[outh] side is higher than the point itself." It is the south headland of Hardwicke Bay. It was named by Matthew Flinders on 18 March 1802. The waters adjoining its shoreline are within the Southern Spencer Gulf Marine Park. Since 1882, it has been the site of a navigation aid in the form of a lighthouse.

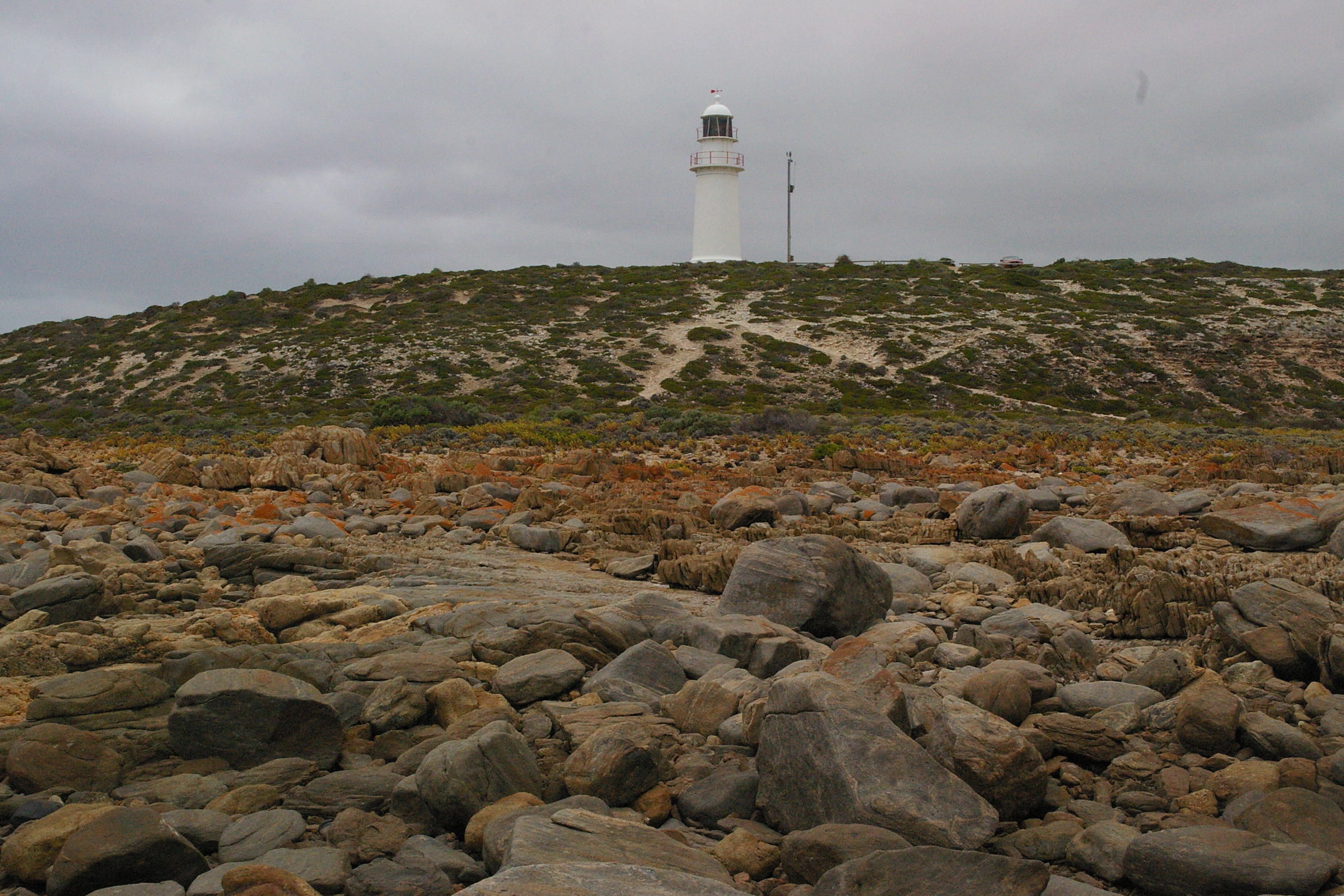
Lighthouse as seen from the shore platform
