= Warooka, South Australia =

Warooka
- Town
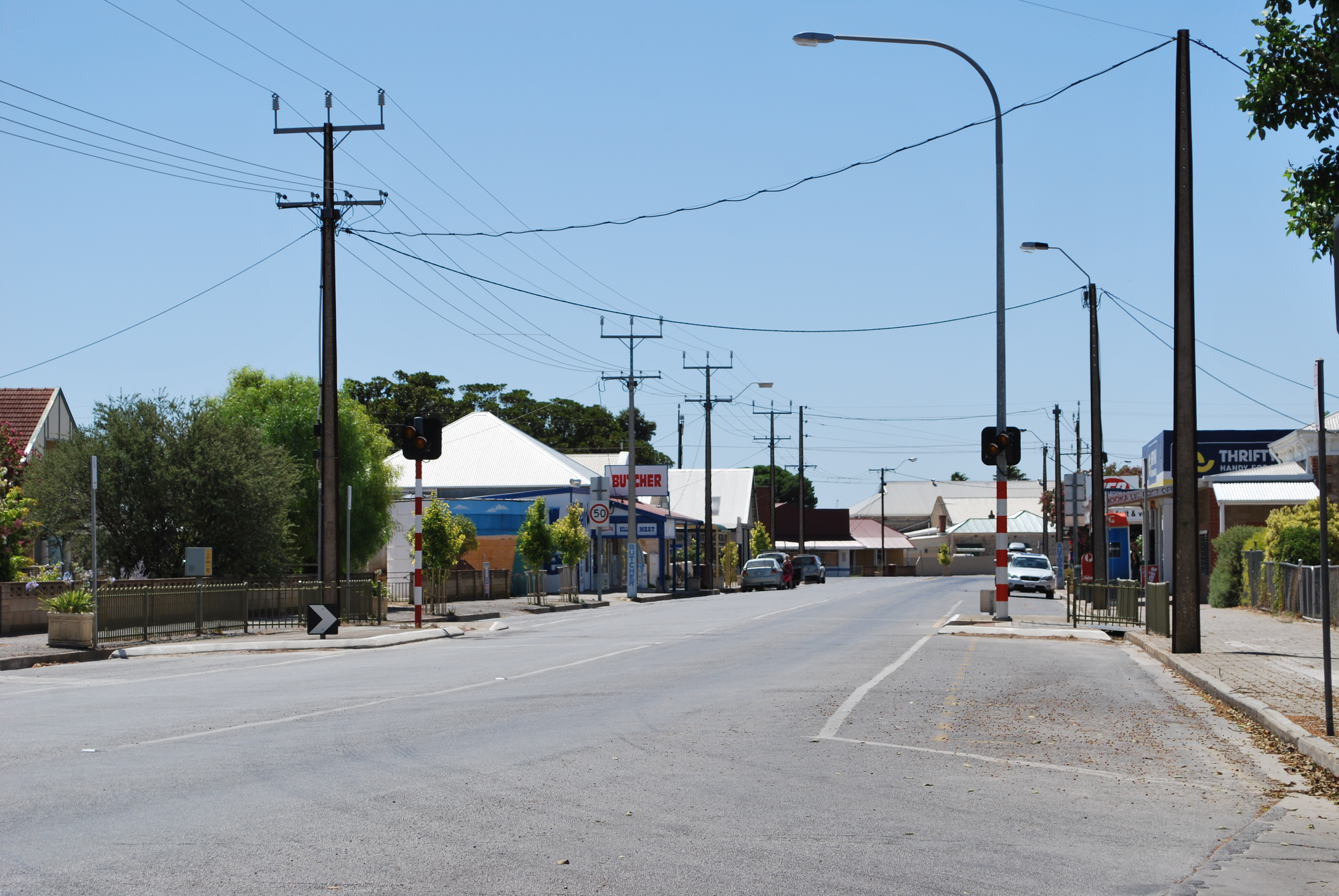
- Main street, 2010

- Coordinates: 34°59′24″S 137°23′56″E
- Country: Australia
- State: South Australia
- LGA: Yorke Peninsula Council
- Location: 230 km (140 mi) W of Adelaide; 128 km (80 mi) S of Kadina; 32 km (20 mi) S of Minlaton

Government
  - State electorate: Narungga
  - Federal division: Grey

Population
  - Total: 194 (UCL 2021)
- Postcode: 5577
- Mean max temp: 21.2 °C (70.2 °F)
- Mean min temp: 11.5 °C (52.7 °F)
- Annual rainfall: 444.2 mm (17.49 in)
Localities around Warooka
Corny Point	The Pines; Point Souttar; Point Turton; Spencer Gulf	Hardwicke Bay
White Hut	Warooka	Yorketown
Marion Bay	Foul Bay; Investigator Strait	Port Moorowie

Warooka is a town on the Yorke Peninsula in South Australia, known as the "Gateway to the bottom end".

== Climate ==
Warooka has a warm-summer Mediterranean climate (Köppen): Csb, with warm, dry summers and mild, relatively wet winters.

Climate data for Warooka (34º59'S, 137º24'E, 53 m AMSL) (1951-2023 normals and extremes, rainfall 1861-2024)
Month	Jan	Feb	Mar	Apr	May	Jun	Jul	Aug	Sep	Oct	Nov	Dec	Year
Record high °C (°F)	44.1 (111.4)	41.6 (106.9)	39.3 (102.7)	33.5 (92.3)	29.0 (84.2)	23.2 (73.8)	21.6 (70.9)	24.0 (75.2)	30.6 (87.1)	36.4 (97.5)	40.6 (105.1)	41.0 (105.8)	44.1 (111.4)
Mean daily maximum °C (°F)	27.3 (81.1)	27.0 (80.6)	25.1 (77.2)	22.1 (71.8)	18.5 (65.3)	15.9 (60.6)	15.0 (59.0)	15.7 (60.3)	17.9 (64.2)	20.8 (69.4)	23.5 (74.3)	25.6 (78.1)	21.2 (70.2)
Mean daily minimum °C (°F)	15.6 (60.1)	16.0 (60.8)	14.7 (58.5)	12.6 (54.7)	10.5 (50.9)	8.6 (47.5)	7.6 (45.7)	7.7 (45.9)	8.7 (47.7)	10.2 (50.4)	12.1 (53.8)	13.8 (56.8)	11.5 (52.7)
Record low °C (°F)	8.1 (46.6)	9.0 (48.2)	7.6 (45.7)	5.6 (42.1)	3.8 (38.8)	2.1 (35.8)	0.6 (33.1)	2.4 (36.3)	2.0 (35.6)	2.6 (36.7)	4.2 (39.6)	6.2 (43.2)	0.6 (33.1)
Average precipitation mm (inches)	14.6 (0.57)	17.3 (0.68)	16.2 (0.64)	32.9 (1.30)	53.9 (2.12)	64.4 (2.54)	65.0 (2.56)	59.0 (2.32)	45.6 (1.80)	35.0 (1.38)	22.6 (0.89)	18.1 (0.71)	444.2 (17.49)
Average precipitation days (≥ 1.0 mm)	1.9	1.9	2.3	4.7	7.8	9.3	10.5	10.1	7.4	5.4	3.5	2.9	67.7
Average afternoon relative humidity (%)	42	44	47	52	62	68	68	64	59	50	44	43	54
Average dew point °C (°F)	10.9 (51.6)	11.7 (53.1)	10.9 (51.6)	9.9 (49.8)	9.6 (49.3)	8.7 (47.7)	7.9 (46.2)	7.7 (45.9)	7.9 (46.2)	7.8 (46.0)	8.1 (46.6)	9.5 (49.1)	9.2 (48.6)
Source: Bureau of Meteorology

== See also ==
- List of cities and towns in South Australia
