= Minlaton, South Australia =

Minlaton South Australia
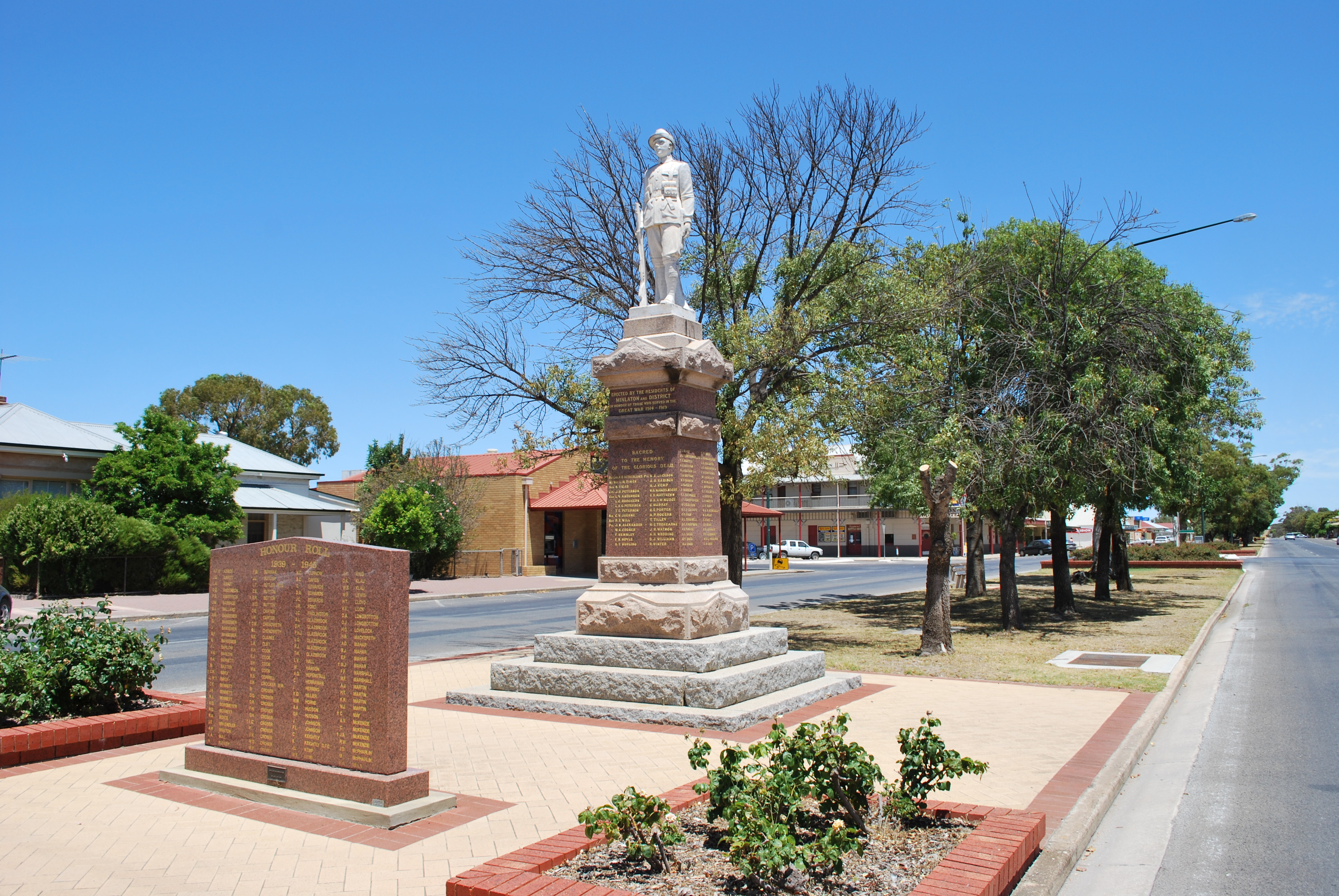
- War memorial on Main St.

- Coordinates: 34°46′21″S 137°35′39″E
- Population: 759 (UCL 2021)
- Established: 1876 (town); 1999 (locality)
- Postcode(s): 5575
- Time zone: ACST (UTC+9:30)
  - Summer (DST): ACST (UTC+10:30)
- Location: 198 km (123 mi) W of Adelaide; 46 km (29 mi) S of Maitland; 96 km (60 mi) S of Kadina
- LGA(s): Yorke Peninsula Council
- Region: Yorke and Mid North
- County: Fergusson
- State electorate(s): Narungga
- Federal division(s): Grey
Localities around Minlaton:
Bluff Beach	Koolywurtie	Curramulka
Parsons Beach	Minlaton	Curramulka; Ramsay
Spencer Gulf	Brentwood; Yorketown	Yorketown
- Footnotes: Adjoining localities

Minlaton is a town in central Yorke Peninsula, South Australia. It is known as the "Barley capital of the world", due to the rich Barley production in the region.

Minlaton was the hometown of Harry Butler, a World War I flying ace. His Bristol M1C monoplane has been restored and is preserved in pride of place in a building the centre of the town. When he flew an air mail run from Adelaide across Gulf St Vincent to Minlaton in 1919, it was the first over-water flight in the Southern Hemisphere.

Minlaton is in the District Council of Yorke Peninsula, the federal Division of Grey and the state electoral district of Narungga.

== Climate ==
Minlaton, like most of the Yorke Peninsula, has a dry mediterranean climate bordering on semi-arid. Annual rainfall is around 360 millimetres or 14 inches, most of which falls in the winter months.

Climate data for Minlaton Aero
Month	Jan	Feb	Mar	Apr	May	Jun	Jul	Aug	Sep	Oct	Nov	Dec	Year
Record high °C (°F)	45.6 (114.1)	44.1 (111.4)	41.0 (105.8)	37.4 (99.3)	30.9 (87.6)	25.9 (78.6)	23.0 (73.4)	29.3 (84.7)	33.0 (91.4)	38.7 (101.7)	44.3 (111.7)	45.9 (114.6)	45.6 (114.1)
Mean daily maximum °C (°F)	29.6 (85.3)	28.6 (83.5)	26.7 (80.1)	23.4 (74.1)	19.5 (67.1)	16.3 (61.3)	15.3 (59.5)	16.4 (61.5)	19.1 (66.4)	22.6 (72.7)	26.0 (78.8)	27.6 (81.7)	22.6 (72.7)
Mean daily minimum °C (°F)	15.4 (59.7)	15.3 (59.5)	14.1 (57.4)	11.9 (53.4)	10.0 (50.0)	7.8 (46.0)	7.0 (44.6)	6.8 (44.2)	7.9 (46.2)	9.3 (48.7)	12.0 (53.6)	13.5 (56.3)	10.9 (51.6)
Record low °C (°F)	6.4 (43.5)	8.0 (46.4)	6.0 (42.8)	5.0 (41.0)	3.0 (37.4)	0.0 (32.0)	−0.3 (31.5)	0.5 (32.9)	0.2 (32.4)	0.8 (33.4)	2.1 (35.8)	3.7 (38.7)	−0.3 (31.5)
Average precipitation mm (inches)	14.5 (0.57)	18.1 (0.71)	16.1 (0.63)	24.5 (0.96)	39.5 (1.56)	52.5 (2.07)	50.0 (1.97)	46.1 (1.81)	35.4 (1.39)	22.8 (0.90)	21.8 (0.86)	19.6 (0.77)	360.3 (14.19)
Average precipitation days (≥ 0.2 mm)	4.6	3.4	5.2	8.6	13.1	17.6	18.5	18.6	14.6	8.3	6.9	6.9	126.3
Average afternoon relative humidity (%)	36	39	40	47	49	67	70	63	58	47	39	39	50

== Gallery ==
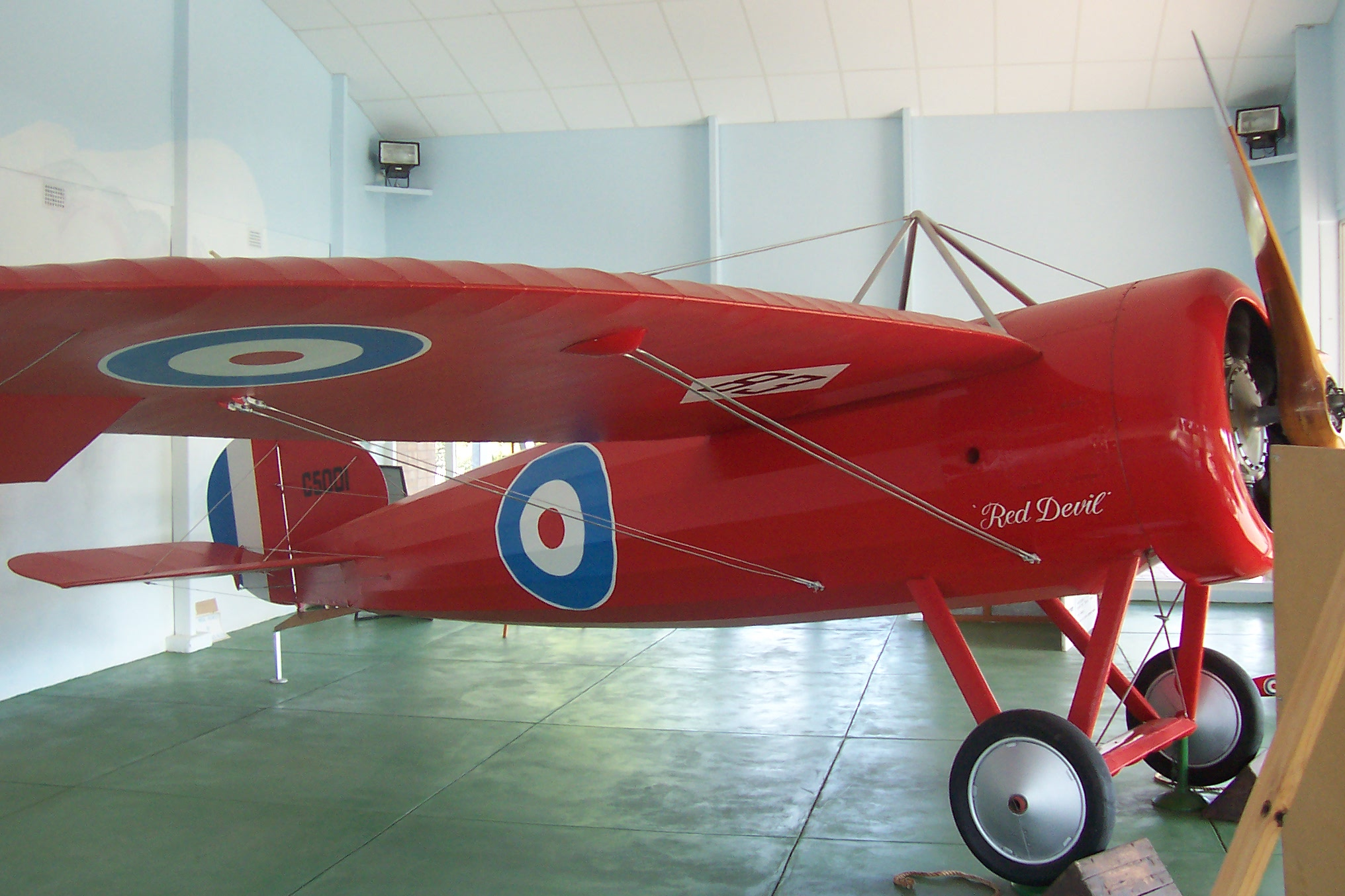
Harry Butler's Red Devil is on display in Minlaton

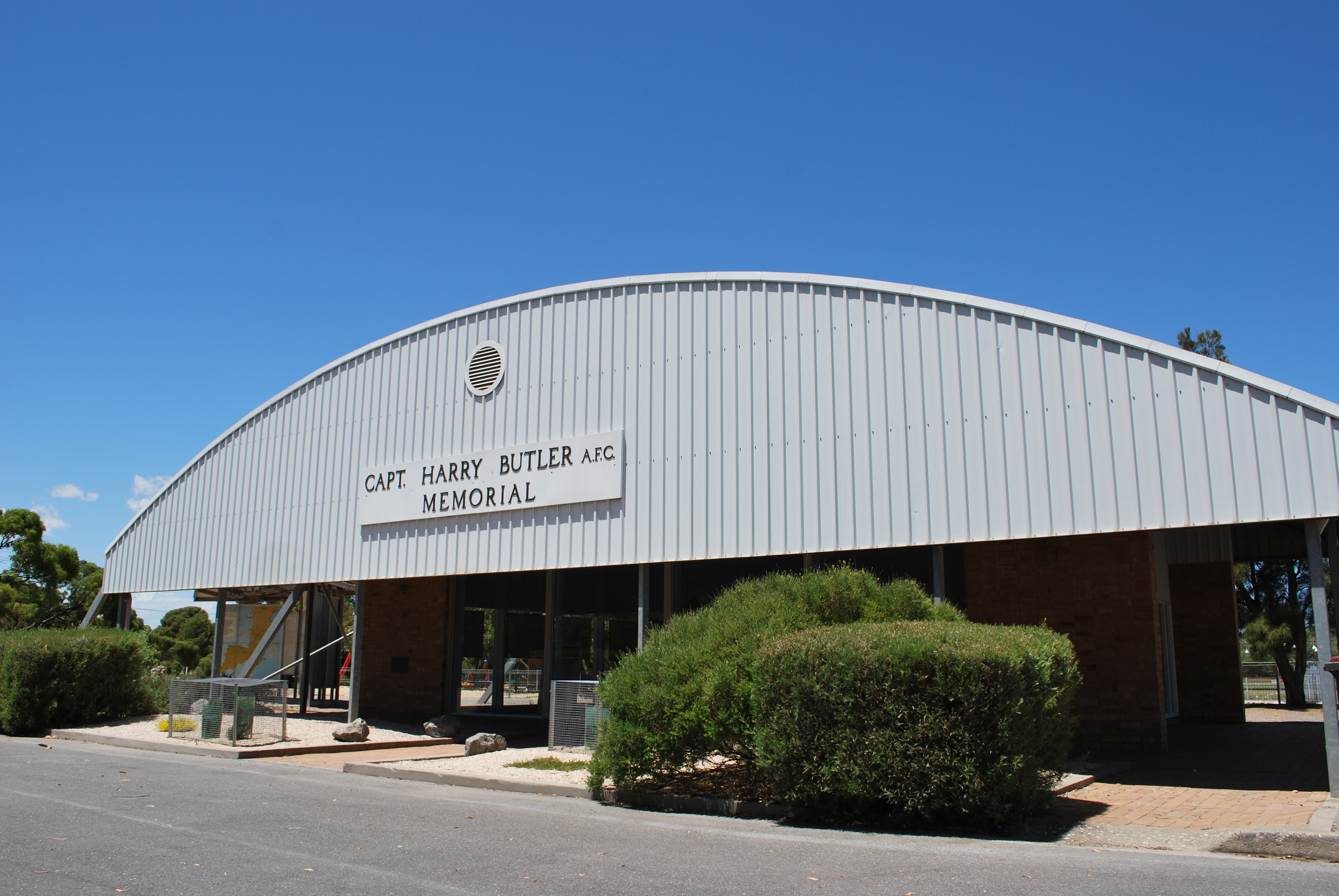
Harry Butler memorial

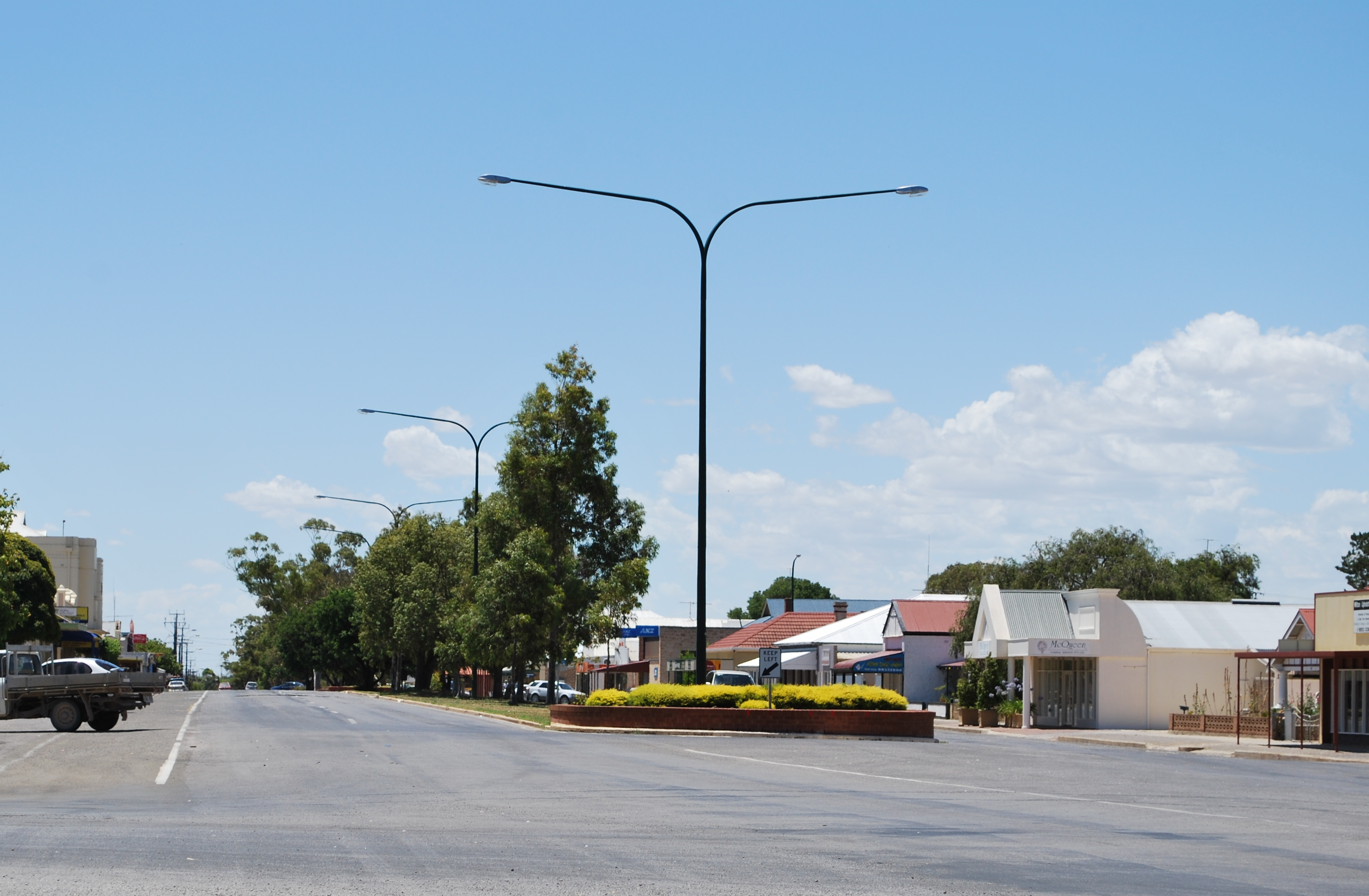
Main street

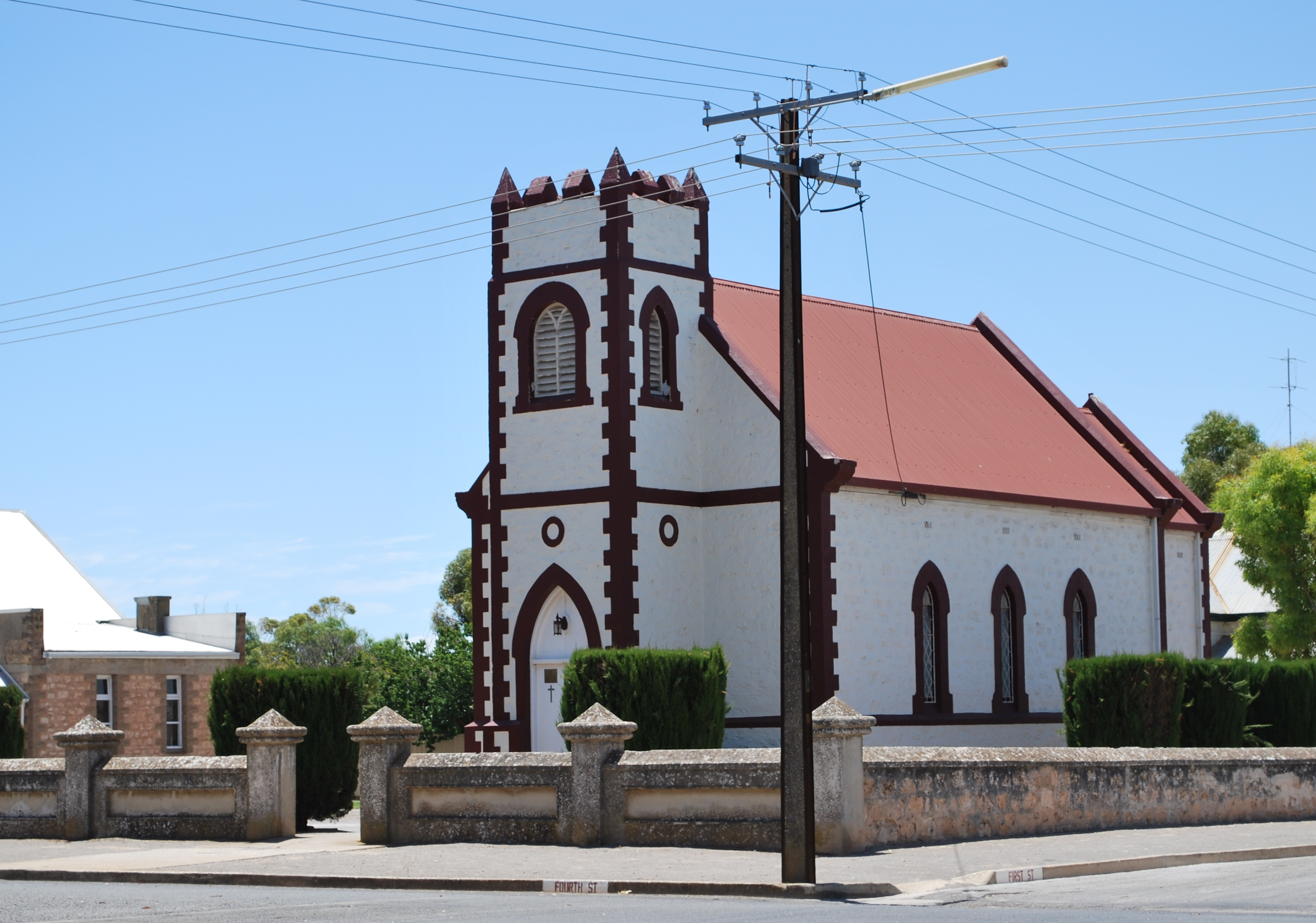
St Benedict's Anglican church, built in 1886

== See also ==
- List of cities and towns in South Australia
