= Point Turton, South Australia =

Point Turton
- Town
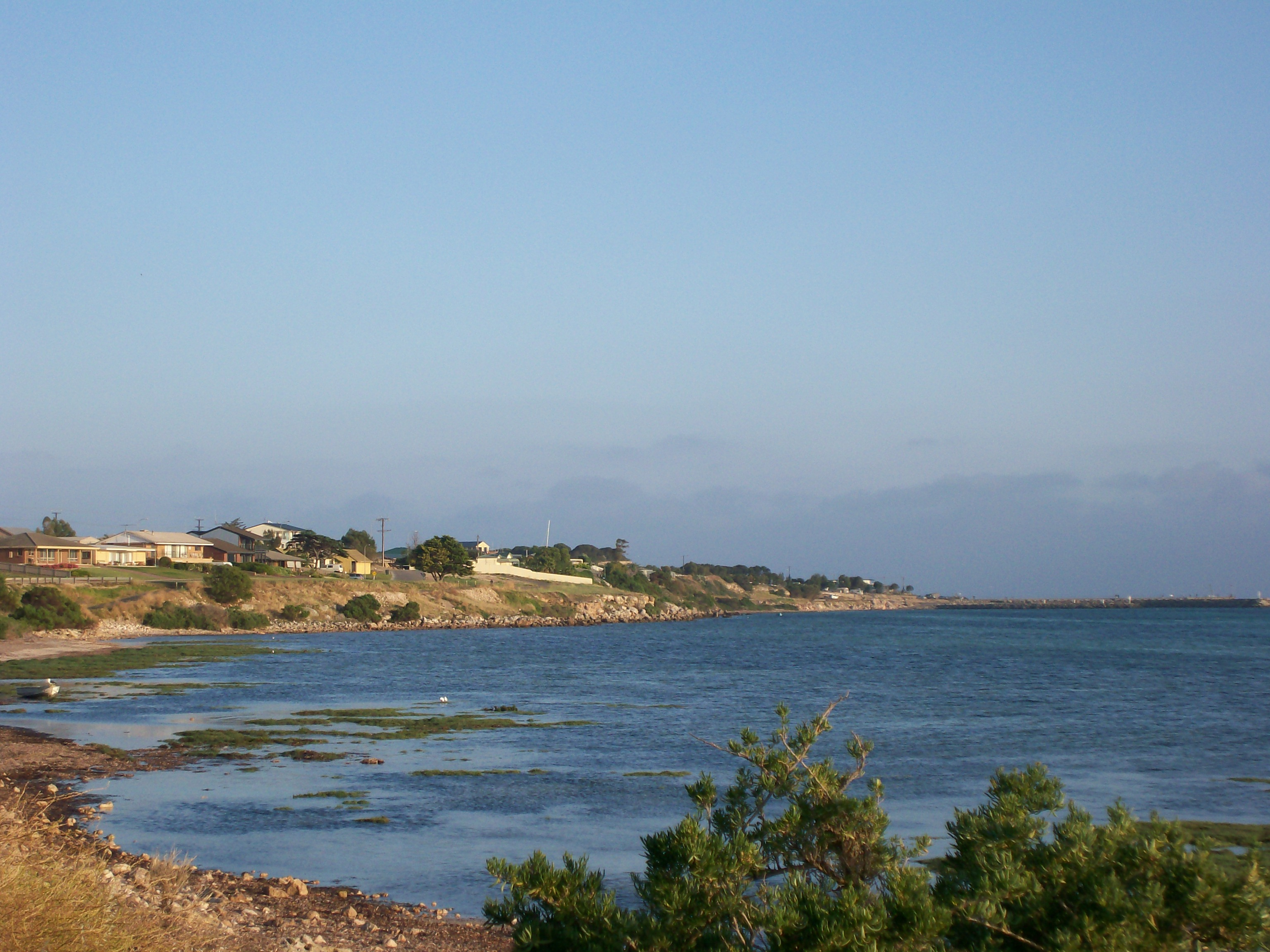
- Part of Point Turton

- Coordinates: 34°56′49″S 137°21′11″E
- Country: Australia
- State: South Australia
- LGA: Yorke Peninsula Council
- Established: 1876

Government
  - State electorate: Narungga
  - Federal division: Grey

Population
  - Total: 327 (UCL 2021)
- Postcode: 5575
Localities around Point Turton
Spencer Gulf	Spencer Gulf	Spencer Gulf
Point Souttar	Point Turton	Warooka
Warooka	Warooka	Warooka

Point Turton is a coastal town 114 kilometres (71 mi) west of Adelaide, South Australia. It is located in the Yorke Peninsula Council.

== History ==
The town was named by a marine surveyor, Captain John Hutchinson, as a commemoration of a double wedding of two daughters of the then Governor of South Australia, Dominick Daly, at Government House. In August 1866, Daly's youngest daughter, artist Caroline Louisa Daly, married Henry Hobhouse Turton, manager of the Savings Bank of South Australia, while the eldest daughter, Joanna, married John Souttar, Manager of the Bank of Adelaide.

The jetty at Point Turton was built in 1876 to ship out the local barley and stone. The quarrying of stone ended in 19173.

== Facilities ==
The Point Turton General Store is the main shopping facility in the town.

The Tavern on Turton is a hotel that opened in 2007.

The town also has a caravan park and some holiday cottages houses along the beachfront.

== Attractions ==
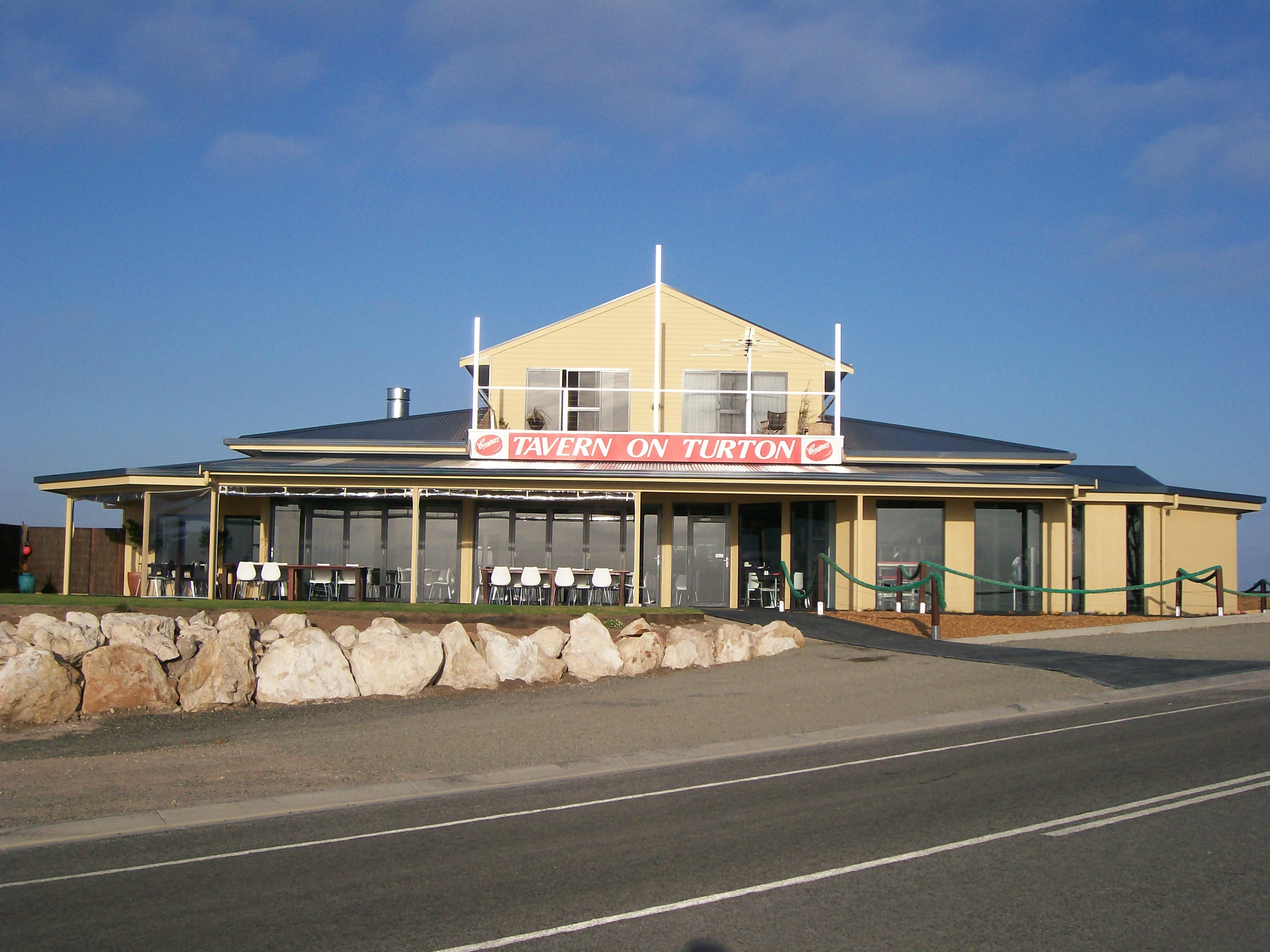
Tavern on Turton opened in mid-2007

Point Turton Jetty: This is a popular spot for fishing and offers a great view of the surrounding area.

Flaherty Beach: Known for its clear water and white beach sand.

Walk the Yorke: A walking and bike riding trail located along the Point Turton foreshore.

Captain Harry Butler Memorial: A tribute to the famous Australian aviator.

== See also ==
- List of cities and towns in South Australia
