= Brentwood Secondary College =

Coordinates: 37°53′56.53″S 145°10′1.56″E

Location
- 65–71 Watsons Road; Glen Waverley, Victoria; Australia

Information
- Type: Public
- Motto: Learning for Leadership, Learning for Understanding, Learning as a community
- Established: 1969
- School district: Eastern Metropolitan Region
- Principal: John Ballagh
- Teaching staff: 130 approx
- Years: 7–12
- Enrollment: 1535
- Colours: Blue (Jacaranda), green (Banksia), red (Waratah), yellow (Wattle)
- Houses: Currently they are called Banksia (green), Wattle (yellow), Waratah (red) and Jacaranda (blue)
- Business manager: Robyn Geshev
- Website: www.brentwood.vic.edu.au

Brentwood Secondary College is a co-educational, public high school, located in Glen Waverley, Victoria, Australia.

Glen Waverley South Primary School adjoins the college, and they have their own oval, which is used for many sport activities such as cricket, soccer and Australian football.

== History ==
Brentwood Secondary College opened in 1969.

Brentwood currently has about 1535 students enrolled in years 7 to 12. The year levels are divided into junior school (years 7–9) and senior school (years 11 and 12) with 2-year level coordinators for each year level respectively.

Each sub-school will be led by a head of school and supported by 2 student managers for each sub-school year level.

== Student exchange ==
Brentwood Secondary College has a sister school in Japan. In alternating years Ono Senior High School and Brentwood send students to the other school to be hosted by students' families. Brentwood also has a similar exchange program with Erasmus Gymnasium in Denzlingen, Germany.

== Music ==
Brentwood has an extensive Instrumental Music Program. Students have a choice to learn an instrument and tuitions offered are: Violin, Viola, Cello, Piano, Voice, Trumpet, Trombone, Clarinet, Flute, Saxophone and Drums. Once students are ready to go into ensembles, they are expected to perform in music concerts which Brentwood conducts. Notable ones are the Gala Night, Spring Soiree and Presentation Night.

== Performing Arts ==
Brentwood has a well-established Performing Arts Program. Their 2025 whole school production, Monty Python's Spamalot, has been nominated for 13 Guild Awards and received 2 commendations. It also received 19 Youth Lyrebird Award nominations and a judge's award.

== Sport ==
Brentwood Secondary College offers a number of sports such as tennis, cricket, table tennis, hockey, and more.

== Notable alumni ==
- George Lambadaridis (2009) – Soccer player for Brisbane Roar
- Madeleine Hogan (2006) – Australian Paralympic athlete
- Lin Jong – AFL Footballer
- Rob Mills – Actor, currently in the Australian show Neighbours
- Isabella Clarke – Highest-placing Australian representative at the Junior Eurovision Song Contest
