= Corny Point, South Australia =

Corny Point South Australia
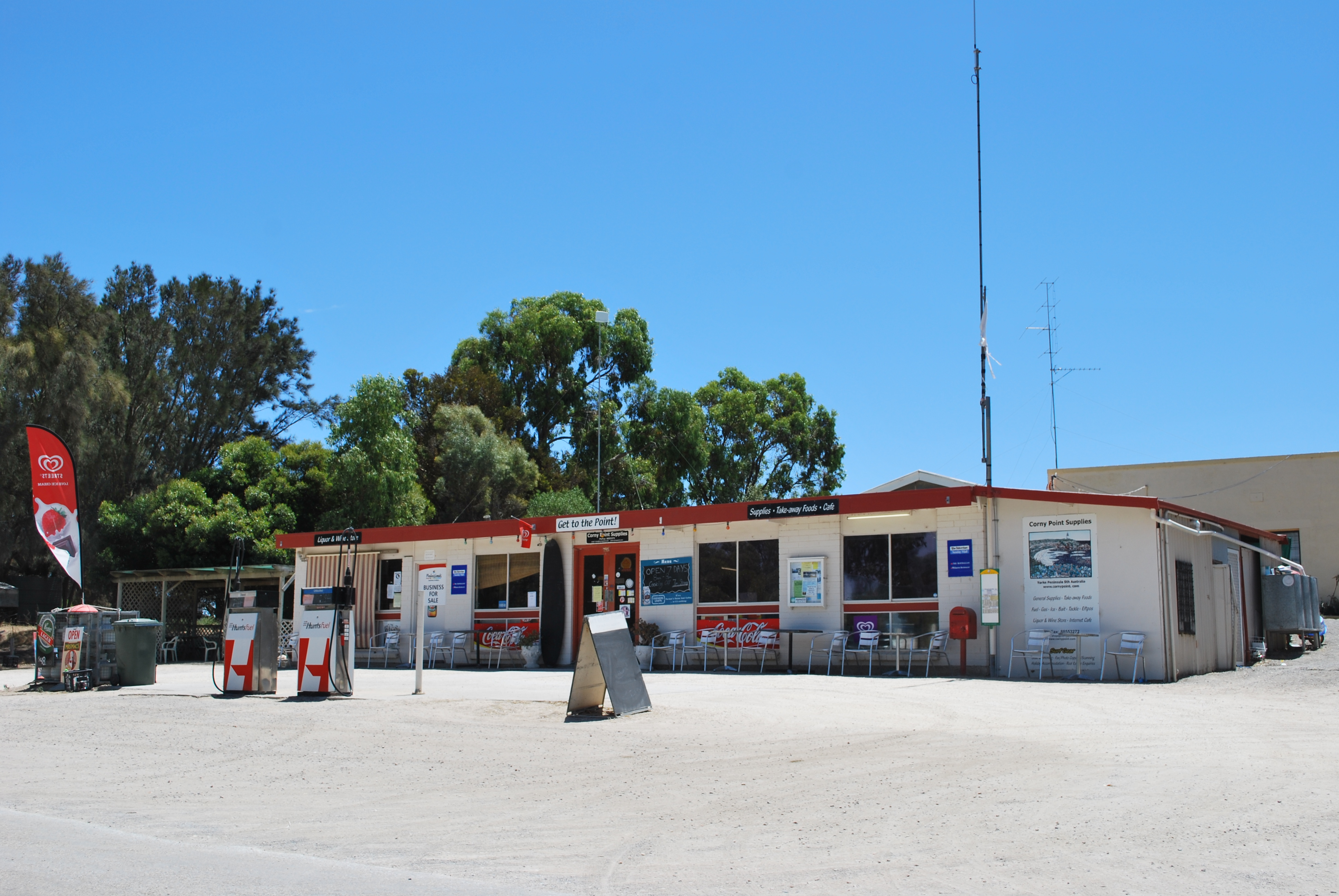
- The General Store at Corny Point

- Coordinates: 34°55′32″S 137°04′53″E
- Population: 120 (SAL 2021)
- Established: 1881; 27 May 1999 (locality)
- Postcode(s): 5575
- Time zone: ACST (UTC+9:30)
  - Summer (DST): ACST (UTC+10:30)
- LGA(s): Yorke Peninsula Council
- Region: Yorke and Mid North
- County: Fergusson
- State electorate(s): Narungga
- Federal division(s): Grey
Localities around Corny Point:
Spencer Gulf	Spencer Gulf	Spencer Gulf
Spencer Gulf	Corny Point	The Pines
White Hut	White Hut	Warooka
- Footnotes: Adjoining localities

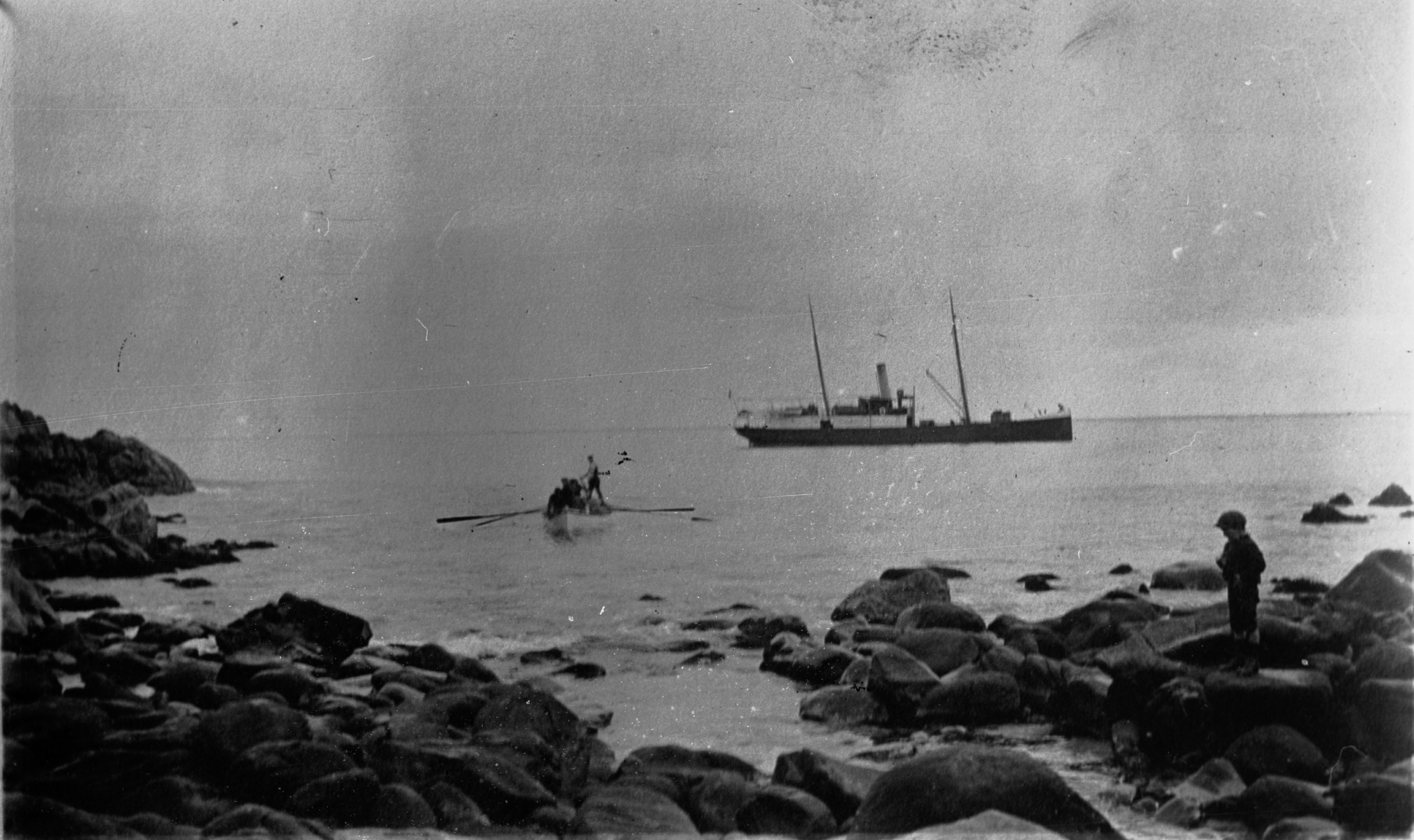
Supply ship 'Lady Loch offshore of Corny Point brings a supplies to the beach circa 1925

Corny Point is a locality in the Australian state of South Australia located about 7.5 kilometres (4.7 miles) to the east of the north-western tip of the Yorke Peninsula. It was named after the nearby headland, Corny Point. The first pastoral lease was taken up in 1846 by James Coutts.

Corny Point is located within the federal division of Grey, the state electoral district of Narungga and the local government area of the Yorke Peninsula Council.

== See also ==
- List of cities and towns in South Australia
- Thidna Conservation Park
- Carribie Conservation Park
