= Port Rickaby, South Australia =

Port Rickaby South Australia
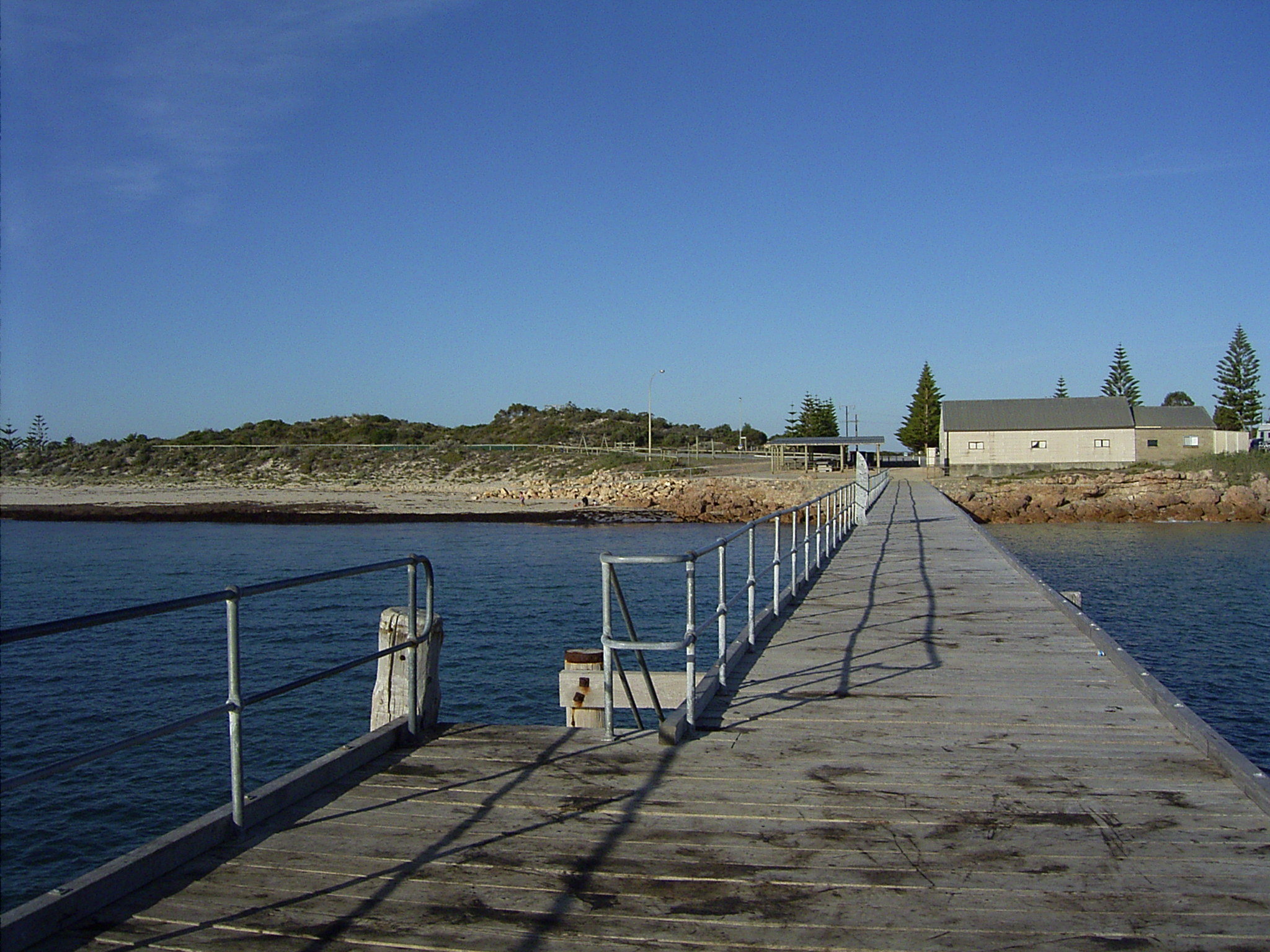
- Port Rickaby jetty

- Coordinates: 34°40′0″S 137°30′0″E
- Population: 69 (SAL 2021)
- Postcode(s): 5576
- LGA(s): Yorke Peninsula Council
- State electorate(s): Narungga
- Federal division(s): Grey

Port Rickaby is a town on the Spencer Gulf coast of Yorke Peninsula in South Australia.

Port Rickaby is in the Yorke Peninsula Council, the state electoral district of Narungga and federal Division of Grey.

== History ==
In 1876 the port was established as a shipping place and named after Thomas Rickaby, an early pioneer from Ireland. Thomas arrived in South Australia in 1858, joining the South Australian Mounted Police before resigning and settling on Yorke Peninsula, and was the first president of the Minlanton Agricultural Show.

The greater area served by the point is known as Koolywurtie, which has an Aboriginal translation of "Where rocks meet the sea".

In 1879 a jetty was constructed to a length of 405 feet (123 m) at a cost of £1,285. It was lengthened three times to a total length of 820 ft (250 m) in 1949.

The farmland served by the port was approximately 34,000 acres (140 km^{2}). Bagged grain was brought in horse-drawn wagons, and later by motor truck to be weighed and stacked in large mouse-proof sheds and yards.

Much of the grain loaded into ketches, such as the Falie, Waimana, Coringle and Eva Lita was transferred into "windjammers" with names such as the Passat, København and Pamir which were anchored off Port Victoria. These ships then made the overseas voyage via Cape Horn to Europe. The last windjammer to leave Port Victoria was the Passat, which departed on 2 June 1949. The last windjammer to visit Port Rickaby was the five masted Kobenhaven in 1924, carrying 65,000 bags of wheat (7,091 tonnes)

The jetty was also used for the unloading of fencing materials, cement, stock, cornsacks, and all the necessary items needed for a new settlement.

In 1964 the government of the day shortened the jetty to save on repair costs.

== Gallery ==
Images of Port Rickaby
