= Bumbunga, South Australia =

Bumbunga South Australia
- Coordinates: 33°54′S 138°13′E
- Population: 20 (SAL 2021)
- Postcode(s): 5520
- Location: 125 km (78 mi) north of Adelaide
- LGA(s): Wakefield Regional Council
- State electorate(s): Narungga
- Federal division(s): Grey
Localities around Bumbunga:
Barunga Gap, Bute	Snowtown	Condowie, Brinkworth
Lochiel, Ninnes	Bumbunga	Everard Central, Blyth
South Hummocks, Kulpara	Nantawarra	Mount Templeton, Whitwarta

Bumbunga is a locality in the Mid North of South Australia 125 kilometres (78 mi) north of Adelaide. It lies 5 kilometres (3.1 mi) east of Lake Bumbunga.

According to anthropologist Norman Tindale the name was derives from parnpangka, the local indigenous (Kaurna) term for 'rain water lake', referring to Lake Bumbunga.

The town administration falls under the control of the Wakefield Regional Council for local governance. Bumbunga lies in the state electoral district of Narungga and in the federal electoral division of Grey.

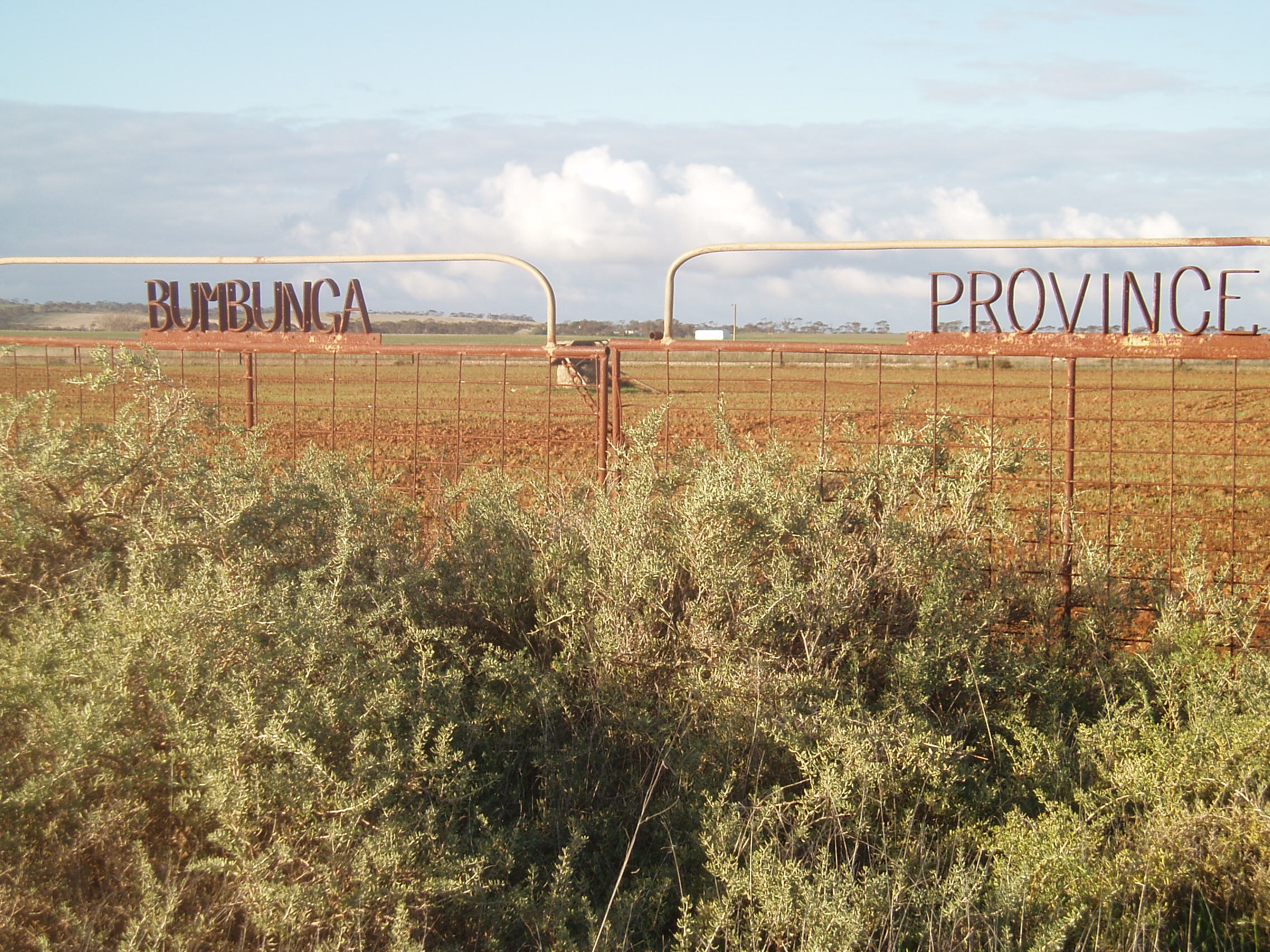
An east-facing 2006 photograph of an entrance to the former micronation, Province of Bumbunga

The South Australian Government's Atlas of South Australia describes the Bumbunga environmental subregion as being a low-lying (mean altitude 130 metres (430 ft) alluvial plains "with salt lakes and occasional dunes." The atlas further describes the subregion as having "grassland cover used for rotation cereal cultivation and livestock grazing" and "low shrubland used for livestock grazing" on salt lake margins.

Located on what was traditionally the land of the Kaurna (indigenous) people, the first pioneers arrived sometime between 1847 and 1849 due to the rapid expansion of farming to the north of the area. Baillière's South Australian gazetteer and road guide, published in 1866, contains a brief description of "Hummock's Run" located 28 miles (45 km) north of Port Wakefield. This farmland, according to the publication, contained the farming stations of Barunga, Bumbunga and Wokurna and consisted of "salt lakes and lagoons, dense scrub, with mallee, pine and bushes, grassy plains and saltbush, well grassed spurs and hills, with oaks and wattle on the Broughton River."

A secessionist micronation, the Province of Bumbunga, was located in Bumbunga for approximately a decade in the 1970s and 1980s.

The Bumbunga railway siding of the Port Pirie railway line was established in the early 1920s during the extension of the main line from Long Plains to Redhill. In 1926, a 5-mile (8.0 km) spur line was completed from the siding to Lochiel salt works on the south-western shore of Lake Bumbunga.

== Salt Lake ==
About 1905 a hamlet called Salt Lake existed on Salt Lake Road, the present-day boundary between Bumbunga and Snowtown 750 metres (800 yards) north of Lake Bumbunga. The hamlet included the Salt Lake school, and a small cemetery that still exists on Salt Lake Road, 1.1 km (0.7 mi) east of Augusta Highway at 33°50′59″S 138°12′06″E.
