= Bumbunga =

Bumbunga may refer to:

- Bumbunga, South Australia
- Lake Bumbunga, South Australia
- Province of Bumbunga, historic micronation in South Australia
