= Copper Coast Highway =

Highway in South Australia

Copper Coast Highway South Australia
- Coordinates: 34.1620°S 138.1556°E (East end); 33.9320°S 137.6283°E (West end)

General information
- Type: Highway
- Length: 57.8 km (36 mi)
- Route number(s): B85 (1998–present)

Major junctions
- East end: Augusta Highway; Port Wakefield Highway; Port Wakefield, South Australia
- Yorke Highway
- West end: Spencer Highway; Wallaroo, South Australia

Location(s)
- Region: Yorke and Mid North
- Major settlements: Kulpara, Paskeville, Kadina

Highway system
- Highways in Australia; National Highway • Freeways in Australia; Highways in South Australia

Copper Coast Highway is a highway in South Australia which branches off from the Augusta and Port Wakefield Highways 2 km north of Port Wakefield, and heads northwest across the top of Yorke Peninsula to Kadina, ending at the Spencer Gulf town of Wallaroo.

== Improvements ==
In 2016, the state government proposed to restructure the intersection on the Copper Coast Highway at the north end of the Yorke Highway to provide a large roundabout instead of Yorke Highway terminating at a tee-junction. The roundabout is intended to reduce delays at the end of holiday periods when many people try to drive back towards Adelaide at the same time, and will permit road trains to operate between Port Wakefield and Ardrossan which had previously not been permitted due to limitations of that intersection. Subsidiary works improved the Yorke Highway north of Ardrossan with a widened bridge, sealed shoulders and overtaking lanes. Road trains up to 36.5 metres (120 ft) were previously permitted to operate on the Augusta Highway through Port Wakefield north towards Port Pirie and beyond, and from Ardrossan south to Port Giles, but were not permitted to operate north of Ardrossan to the Augusta Highway, limiting the capacity to transport grain or minerals. Work commenced on the roundabout in October 2017 and it was completed in January 2018.

A proposal by the Liberal Party of Australia before the 2018 state election was that if it was elected it would build a single lane overpass at the Port Wakefield end of the Copper Coast Highway to reduce traffic conflicts. The party won the election and upgraded the planning to completely grade-separate the intersection. The contract for detailed design and construction of duplication of the highway through Port Wakefield and a grade-separated intersection with the Augusta and Port Wakefield Highways was let in March 2020 to the Port Wakefield to Port Augusta Alliance (a consortium of CPB Contractors, Aurecon and GHD Group, also responsible for the duplication of Joy Baluch AM Bridge in Port Augusta), with the government announcing an overpass for the intersection with the Augusta and Port Wakefield Highways in 2021. Project construction commenced in late 2020, with completion expected in 2022; the overpass opened in December 2021, four months ahead of schedule.

== Major intersections and towns ==
LGA	Location	km	mi	Destinations	Notes
Wakefield	Port Wakefield	0.0	0.0	Augusta Highway (A1 north) – Snowtown, Port Augusta; Port Wakefield Highway (A1 south) – Adelaide	Eastern terminus of highway and route B85
Wakefield	Port Arthur	6.0	3.7	Yorke Highway (B86) – Ardrossan	Road-train capable roundabout
Barunga West	Kulpara	17.2	10.7	Upper Yorke Road – Maitland, Bute	
Copper Coast	Paskeville	30.0	18.6	Prices Road – Ninnes	
Copper Coast	Paskeville	33.9	21.1	Ninnes Road – Lochiel	
Copper Coast	Paskeville	35.1	21.8	Thrington Road – Moonta	
Copper Coast	Kadina	48.8	30.3	Port Broughton Road (north) – Port Broughton; Mines Road (south) – Moonta	
Copper Coast	Wallaroo	57.8	35.9	Spencer Highway (B89) – Port Broughton, Moonta	Western terminus of highway and route B85
Route transition
