= Kainton, South Australia =

Kainton South Australia
- Coordinates: 34°7′S 137°54′E
- Population: 54 (SAL 2021)
- Postcode(s): 5552
- Time zone: ACST (UTC+9:30)
  - Summer (DST): ACDT (UTC+10:30)
- LGA(s): Yorke Peninsula Council
- Region: Yorke and Mid North
- County: Daly
- State electorate(s): Narungga
- Federal division(s): Grey
Localities around Kainton:
Paskeville	Paskeville; Melton; Kulpara; Port Arthur	Port Arthur
Sunnyvale	Kainton	Port Arthur; Gulf St Vincent
Arthurton	Clinton Centre; Clinton	Gulf St Vincent
- Footnotes: Adjoining localities

Kainton is a small town in the Australian state of South Australia situated about 10 km south of Paskeville in the upper Yorke Peninsula.

The Kainton school closed in 1907, but the "Hundred of Clinton School" was renamed "Kainton School" in 1915.

Kainton is located within the federal Division of Grey, the state electoral district of Narungga and the local government area known as the Yorke Peninsula Council.

== See also ==
- List of cities and towns in South Australia
- Clinton Conservation Park

== Notes and references ==
Notes

Citations
