= Beetaloo (disambiguation) =

Beetaloo may refer to several things in Australia:

- Beetaloo Station, Northern Territory
- Beetaloo Sub-Basin, part of the McArthur Basin in the Northern Territory
- Beetaloo Reservoir, a water reservoir in South Australia
- Beetaloo Valley, South Australia, the locality surrounding the reservoir
