= South Hummocks, South Australia =

South Hummocks South Australia
- Coordinates: 34.0°S 138.1°E
- Population: 30 (SAL 2021)
- Postcode(s): 5550
- Location: 14 km (9 mi) north of Port Wakefield
- LGA(s): District Council of Barunga West; Wakefield Regional Council
- State electorate(s): Narungga
- Federal division(s): Grey
Localities around South Hummocks:
Ninnes	Lochiel
	South Hummocks	Lochiel
Kulpara	Port Arthur	Beaufort

South Hummocks is a locality in the Mid North of South Australia at the head of Gulf St Vincent adjacent to Yorke Peninsula on the southeastern slopes of the Hummock Range.

Most of South Hummocks is part of the Hundred of Kulpara in the District Council of Barunga West, but a strip along the northern and eastern sides is part of Hundred of Cameron and Hundred of Goyder in the Wakefield Regional Council. For federal elections, it is in the federal Division of Grey. It is in the state electoral district of Narungga.

South Hummocks formerly had a government school and a church. The school opened in 1882 and closed in 1945. The post office opened in 1869, closed 1917 to 1925, then finally closed again in 1952.

The town was also a stop on the Balaklava-Moonta railway line from 1878 until 1984.
