= Beetaloo Dam =

Former dam and reservoir in South Australia

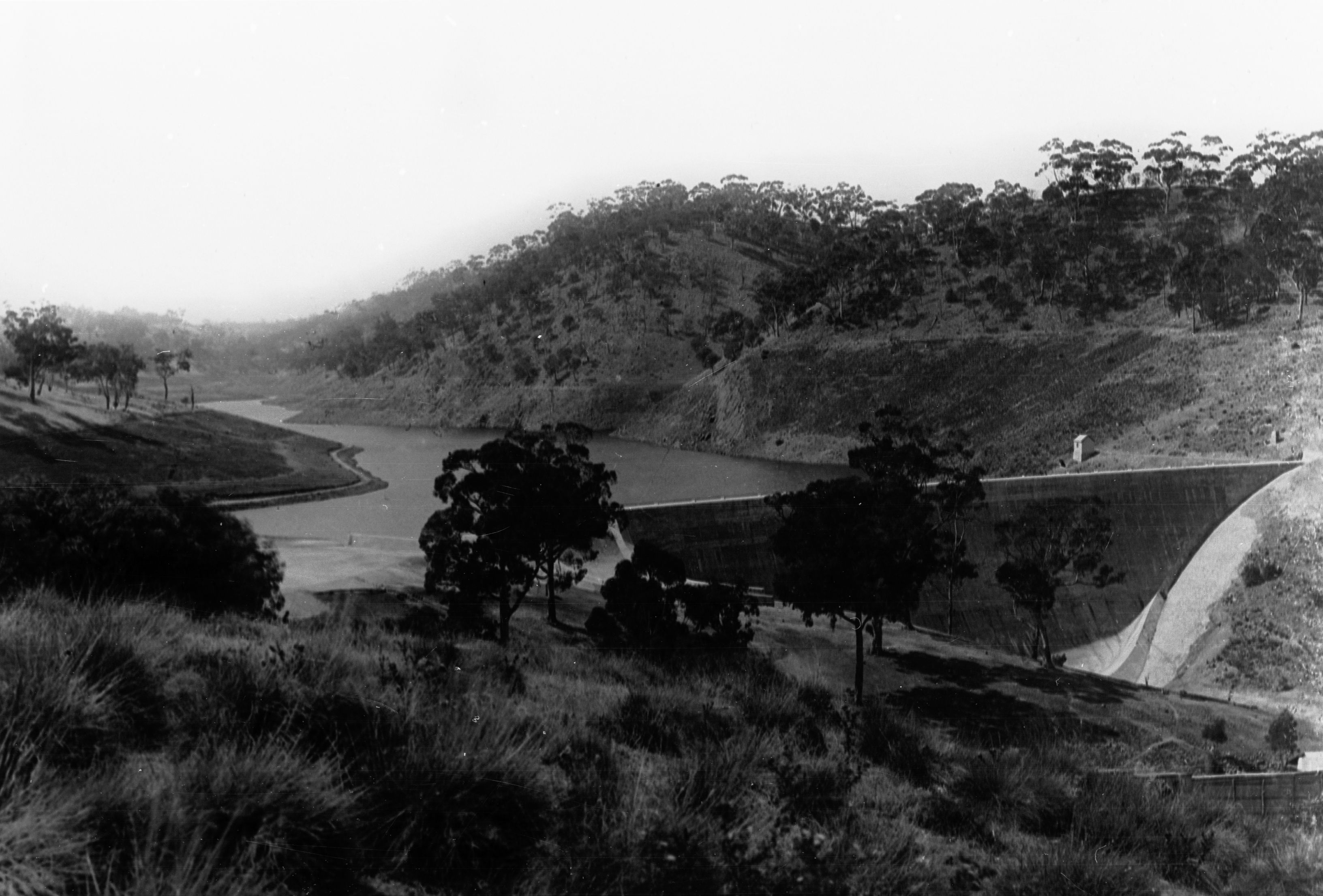
- Th dam and reservoir in 1924

- Location of the dam in South Australia
- Interactive map of Beetaloo Dam
- Country: Australia
- Location: Port Pirie, South Australia
- Coordinates: 33°11′23″S 138°12′54″E
- Purpose: Water supply
- Status: Decommissioned
- Construction began: February 28, 1887
- Opening date: November 1890
- Built by: Government of South Australia
- Operator: SA Water

Dam and spillways
- Type of dam: Gravity dam
- Impounds: Crystal Brook
- Height (foundation): 35 m (115 ft)
- Length: 180 m (590 ft)
- Width (crest): 4.3 m (14 ft)
- Width (base): 34 m (110 ft)
- Dam volume: 44×10^{3} m^{3} (1.6×10^{6} cu ft)
- Spillway type: Uncontrolled
- Spillway capacity: 500 m^{3}/s (18,000 cu ft/s)

Reservoir
- Creates: Beetaloo Reservoir
- Total capacity: 3.18 GL (2,580 acre⋅ft)
- Catchment area: 48 km^{2} (19 sq mi)
- Surface area: 33.3 ha (82 acres)
- Maximum length: 2.01 km (1.25 mi)
- Normal elevation: 358 m (1,175 ft) AHD

The Beetaloo Dam is a decommissioned gravity dam across Crystal Brook, in the locality of Beetaloo Valley in the hills east of Port Pirie, in the southern Flinders Ranges, in the Mid North region of South Australia. Built in 1890 for the supply of potable water for the Yorke Peninsula, the resultant reservoir, Beetaloo Reservoir, no longer supplies drinking water and is kept as a reserve for a major outage on the Morgan-Whyalla pipeline and as a recreation and fishing reserve.

== Overview ==
The concrete dam was built between 1886 and 1890 as a source for water to supply settlements on the Yorke Peninsula. The dam wall is 35 metres (115 ft) high and 180 metres (590 ft) long. The reservoir has a capacity of 3.18 gigalitres (2,580 acre⋅ft) when full and covers 33.3 hectares (82 acres), drawn from a catchment area of 48 square kilometres (19 sq mi).

When it was built, Beetaloo Dam was considered the largest concrete dam in the southern hemisphere. Construction of the dam was part of a larger project that also included the excavation of storage reservoirs at Barunga in the northern Hummocks Range and Paskeville on the plateau at the top of Yorke Peninsula, and the pipes to supply them. At the time of its construction, Yorke Peninsula was a developing agricultural base, as well as copper mining and smelting industry in the Copper Triangle area around Kadina, Wallaroo and Moonta. The dam is sufficiently higher than Barunga that a pumping station is not required, and Barunga is higher than Paskeville. The reservoir is now the smallest of SA Water's 16 reservoirs.

The reservoir is located on the traditional lands of the Nukunu people. The public lookout displays an artwork by Nukunu artist Jessica Turner titled Wobma. It shows the cultural and spiritual relationship the Nukunu people have with land and water in the Spencer Gulf and Southern Flinders Ranges.

== See also ==
- List of reservoirs and dams in South Australia
