= Kulpara, South Australia =

Kulpara
- Town
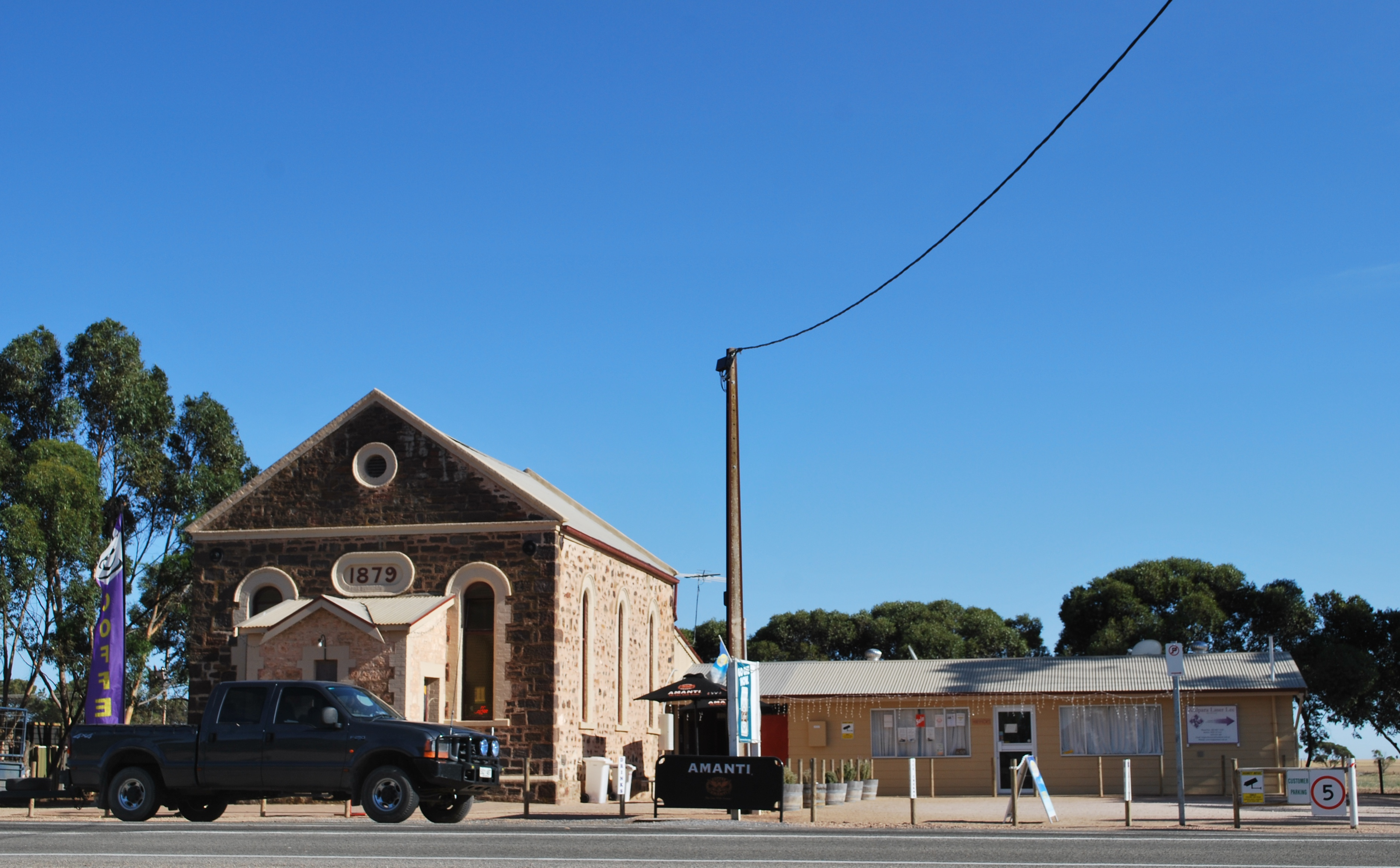
- Cafe in the former church buildings at Kulpara

- Coordinates: 34.06°S 138.04°E
- Country: Australia
- State: South Australia
- LGA: District Council of Barunga West
- Location: 117 km (73 mi) north of Adelaide; 20 km (12 mi) northwest of Port Wakefield; 32 km (20 mi) east of Kadina
- Established: 1864

Government
  - State electorate: Goyder
  - Federal division: Grey
- Elevation: 117 m (384 ft)

Population
  - Total: 56 (SAL 2021)
- Postcode: 5552
Localities around Kulpara
Paskeville	Ninnes	South Hummocks; Lochiel
Melton; Paskeville	Kulpara	South Hummocks
Kainton	Kainton; Clinton	Port Arthur; Port Wakefield

Kulpara is a rural town in South Australia, situated on the Copper Coast Highway and Upper Yorke Road in the Hummocks Range at the northern end of Yorke Peninsula.

The name Kulpara is derived from an Aboriginal word Kula meaning "eucalyptus". The area was proclaimed in 1862, surveyed in 1864 and settled soon after. The township itself was surveyed in 1932 and proclaimed in 1934. A community hall was built in 1902, and replaced by a soldiers' memorial hall in 1953. The school opened in 1877 and expanded in 1957. The Bible Christian church foundation stone was laid in 1879 with services starting soon after. The church building is now a convenience store.

It was the seat of its municipality, the District Council of Kulpara, from 1878 to 1932.

A fossil genus of stromatolite-forming cyanobacteria, Kulparia, was discovered near and named after this town.
