= SA Water =

Water utility provider

SA Water is a government business enterprise wholly owned by the Government of South Australia. It is a successor to the Engineering and Water Supply Department, styled E & W S, a state government department, which was itself preceded by the Waterworks and Drainage Commission. SA Water currently reports to the Minister for Housing and Urban Development.

== History ==
=== Origins ===
In the early days of Adelaide, citizens not sufficiently wealthy to have their own wells relied on carted water which, coming from the River Torrens at the ford between Morphett Street and King William Road, was polluted and probably unsafe to drink. The carters were a law unto themselves: exempt from road tolls despite causing more damage to the roads than any other vehicle, and colluding in the rates they charged, ostracising any of their number who undercharged. One carter, "Worthy" Worthington George Nicholls, who was found to be delivering free loads to the poor, was persecuted mercilessly and eventually killed himself.

Waste disposal was similarly chaotic. The effluent from soap factories and tanneries was discharged onto roads or into the River Torrens, and human waste of those who had not dug pits was collected by night-cart men. There was no systematic drainage of the roads, which in winter could become a quagmire.

John Stephens, editor of The Register, knew the city could never progress without a huge investment in public infrastructure, and at a well-attended lecture at the Mechanics' Hall called a public meeting for 13 February 1849 to address the problem. The Adelaide Times dismissed the public meeting as Stephens' attempt to upstage J. H. Fisher, disparaged his lecture, and cast doubts as to whether the "better class of people" would attend. Whatever the reason, only sixty turned up. Stephens died the following year and no-one with any crusading zeal took his place. The political class was appointed, not elected, so may have been more concerned with balancing the books than investing in the future. Attempts by the City Council to borrow funds to pipe water from Brownhill Creek were blocked by the Legislative Council.

The Colonial Architect, W. B. Hayes, (Note: W(illiam) Bennett Hayes was Clerk of Works in the Colonial Engineer's Department, designed bridge over the Torrens, appointed Colonial Architect in 1852, designed the Willunga jetty (in the wrong place); Taylors Road Bridge (1857), Police Barracks and Armory (later part of Adelaide Destitute Asylum), the (two-storey) Old Parliament House, and the jetty at Horseshoe Bay.) proposed that a water and sewerage board be formed along the lines of that established for London, but again was defeated by the Legislative Council. Attempts by The Register to hasten things along met with public apathy.

=== Waterworks and Drainage Commission ===
Finally, on 10 June 1856 the Waterworks and Drainage Commission was appointed with Sir Samuel Davenport as Chief Commissioner, with G. M. Waterhouse and J. Lazar (the then mayor of Adelaide) forming the Commission. G. E. Hamilton was appointed Engineer at a salary of £800 p.a. (considerably more than the Chief Commissioner at £500 and the Commissioners at £200 each.

The membership of the Commission did not last long. Davenport resigned in 1857 to take a seat in South Australia's first elected parliament (he later became Premier), W. H. Maturin was appointed his successor, and Waterhouse resigned in protest at being sidelined. Maturin resigned in 1858 and this time Waterhouse was appointed Chief.

Hamilton did not last long either. The £175,000 cost estimate for road drainage was not accepted by parliament, the foundations for the weir across the Torrens Gorge had to be made more substantial (and expensive) than originally estimated, and the design for the sewerage and sewage treatment was criticised by S. C. Homersham as contrary to best practice. The Commissioner of Public Works, Thomas Reynolds, did his best to undermine Waterhouse's plans. The final straw was a storm and flood in July 1858 which washed away the Torrens Gorge weir (near Campbelltown), which was found to be defective in construction and materials used. Though the Clerk of Works was found negligent in his oversight of the contract, Hamilton's reputation suffered and he resigned, to be replaced by John England. Thorndon Park reservoir was completed in 1860, but England was criticised by Benjamin Boothby for making excessive payments to contractors on its construction, and left the colony in 1867.

=== Engineering and Water Supply Department ===
Having discovered the disadvantages of an independent Commission, in 1859 the government set about creating a Waterworks Department under the Commissioner of Public Works, along with the Roads, Railways, and Telegraph departments. The department became a target of accusations of mismanagement between successive Hanson and Reynolds governments, with J. D. Woods, Manager of Waterworks, the unfortunate pawn in the power play.

The Waterworks Department, also known as the Hydraulic Engineer's Department, was merged with the Engineer-in-Chief's Department on November 1st, 1929 to form the Engineering and Water Supply Department. Julian R. Dridan undertook the role of Engineer in Chief from 1949 to 1965, and Director and Engineer in Chief from 1965 to1966.

=== SA Water ===
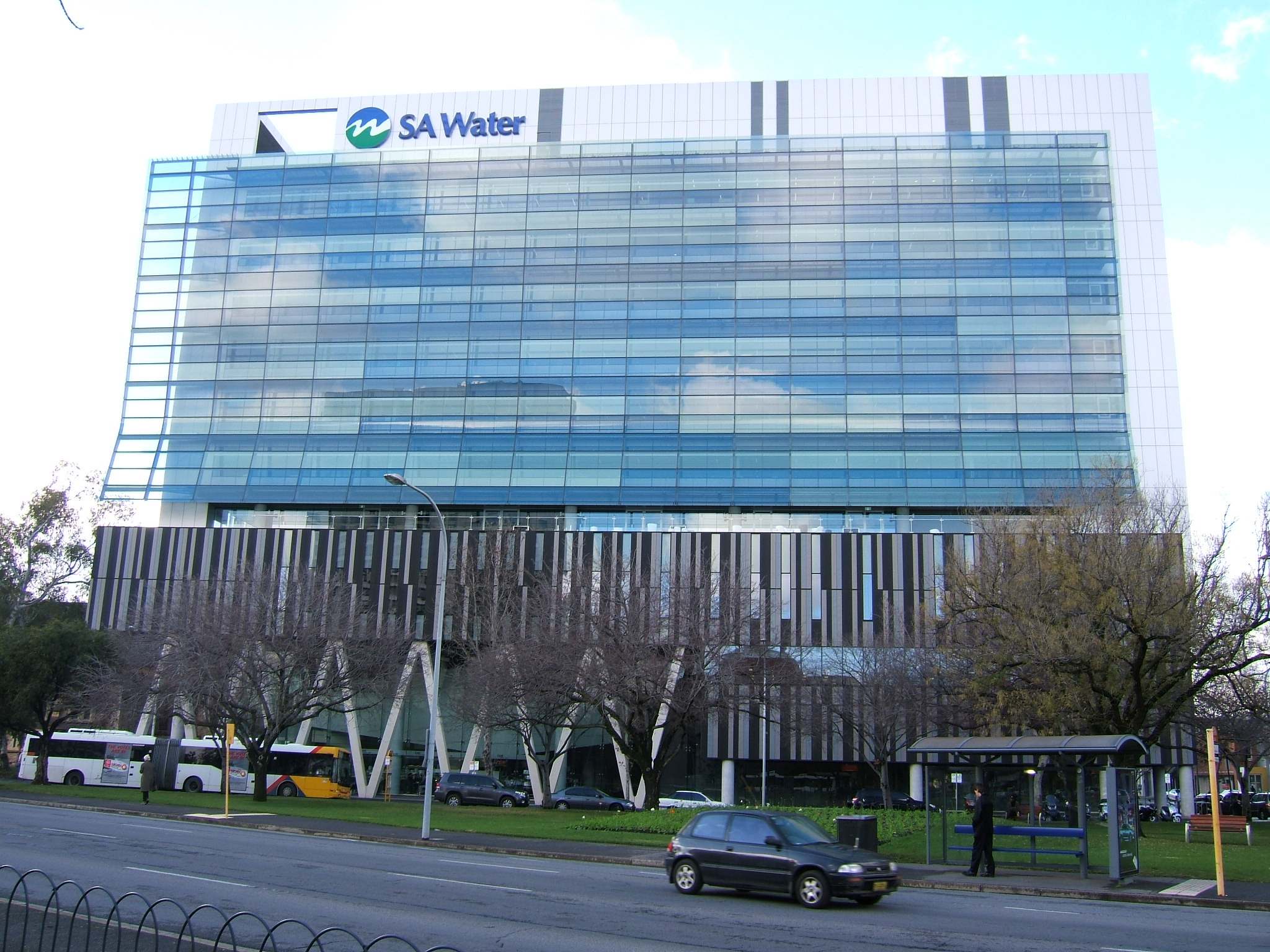
SA Water's newer Headquarters on Victoria Square in the Adelaide city centre, completed in 2007.

SA Water was established by the proclamation of the South Australian Water Corporation Act 1994 on 1 July 1995.

Key infrastructure projects undertaken by SA Water and its predecessors include:

- Bores at Plympton and Morphettville (Note: In 1915 the Plympton bore delivered 10,000 imperial gallons per hour (45 m^{3}/h) and Morphettville 15,000 imperial gallons per hour (68 m^{3}/h) respectively. were Adelaide's backup supply before the pipelines from the Murray.)
- Morgan – Whyalla pipeline (1940–1944)
- Mannum – Adelaide pipeline (1949–1955)
- Hope Valley Reservoir (commenced work 1869)
- Mount Bold Reservoir (commenced work 1932)
- Bolivar Waste Water Treatment Plant (commenced work 1961)
- Swan Reach-Paskeville pipeline (extended from Swan Reach-Stockwell pipeline), 1960s
- Adelaide Desalination Plant (2008–2012)
- North South Interconnection System Project (NSISP) (2010–2013)

== Assets and infrastructure ==
SA Water manages, maintains and operates (with the assistance of its partners) assets worth $13 billion. These include:

- More than 26,000 km of water mains
- More than 8,700 km of sewer mains
- More than 180 km of recycled water mains
- 30 water treatment plants
- 24 wastewater treatment plants
- More than 16 reservoirs with a total capacity of almost 200,000 megalitres
- Terminal Storage Mini Hydro, a 3MW electricity generator powered by water flowing from Anstey Hill to Hope Valley.

SA Water also owns desalination plants at Lonsdale and Penneshaw.

== Customers and community ==
SA Water provides water and wastewater services to a population of approximately 1.5 million people across South Australia. In 2011/12 the total volume of water delivered was 208,144 ML and the average residential consumption per household was 164.3 kL.

SA Water runs a school education program called SA Water Brainwave that is offered free to South Australian schools. SA Water also offers free community tours of wastewater and water treatment plants. In 2013, SA Water opened the Kauwi Interpretive Centre at the Adelaide Desalination Plant which is also open for visitors.

== Location and staff ==
SA Water employs more than 1,500 people and has its head office in Victoria Square in Adelaide (SA Water House). Staff are also located across South Australia including offices in Mount Gambier, Berri, Mount Barker, Port Lincoln and Crystal Brook as well as Victoria and New South Wales. SA Water's customer service centre operates out of the head office in Victoria Square. SA Water House is also the headquarters of the Australian Water Quality Centre (AWQC).

== Controversies ==
Some customers have unknowingly consumed purified recycled wastewater after plumbers employed by builders cross-connected the drinking water supply to the recycled water network.

== See also ==
- Adelaide
- Lake Victoria (New South Wales)
- City of Burnside
