= Swan Reach-Paskeville pipeline =

Treated water transmission pipeline in South Australia

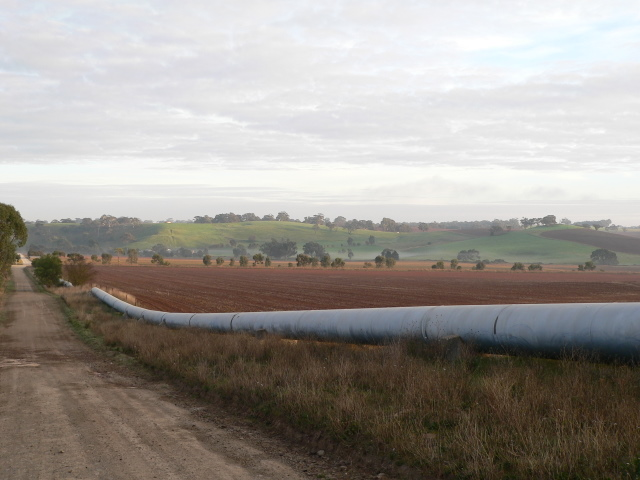
- Swan Reach-Stockwell Pipeline at Moculta

Location
- Country: Australia
- State: South Australia
- Coordinates: 34.5021490°S 139.568°E
- Direction: east-west
- Start: Murray River upstream of Swan Reach
- Passes through: Stockwell
- To: Paskeville

General information
- Type: water
- Status: O
- Owner: SA Water
- Operator: SA Water

Technical information
- Length: 189 km (117 mi)
- No. of pumping stations: 3
- Pumping stations: Swan Reach, Sedan, Truro

The Swan Reach to Paskeville pipeline is a 189 km long water pipeline in South Australia. It delivers treated water drawn from the River Murray upstream of Swan Reach to the Barossa Valley and Yorke Peninsula and places in between. It was originally constructed as the Swan Reach to Stockwell pipeline, but then extended across the Mid North to Paskeville. It was built in the 1960s. Water is treated at the inlet near Swan Reach.

There are three pumping stations to lift water from near sea level at Swan Reach to the highest point near Moculta in the Mount Lofty Ranges east of the northern Barossa Valley. The first pump station lifts water 156 metres (512 ft) from Swan Reach to tanks at Black and White Hills. The second lifts the water 125 metres (410 ft) to Towitta Tanks. The third lifts 121 metres (397 ft) to Moculta Tanks. Each pumping station has three or four pumps, and can pump up to 84.3 megalitres (2.98×10^{6} cu ft) per day. After 50 years of operation, the pumps and valves required upgrade and replacement.

As part of its upgrade to reduce energy costs, SA Water is installing solar farms next to many of its pump stations, including the first two on the Swan Reach to Stockwell pipeline. These solar farms will be operational in 2021.
