= Paskeville, South Australia =

Paskeville
- Town
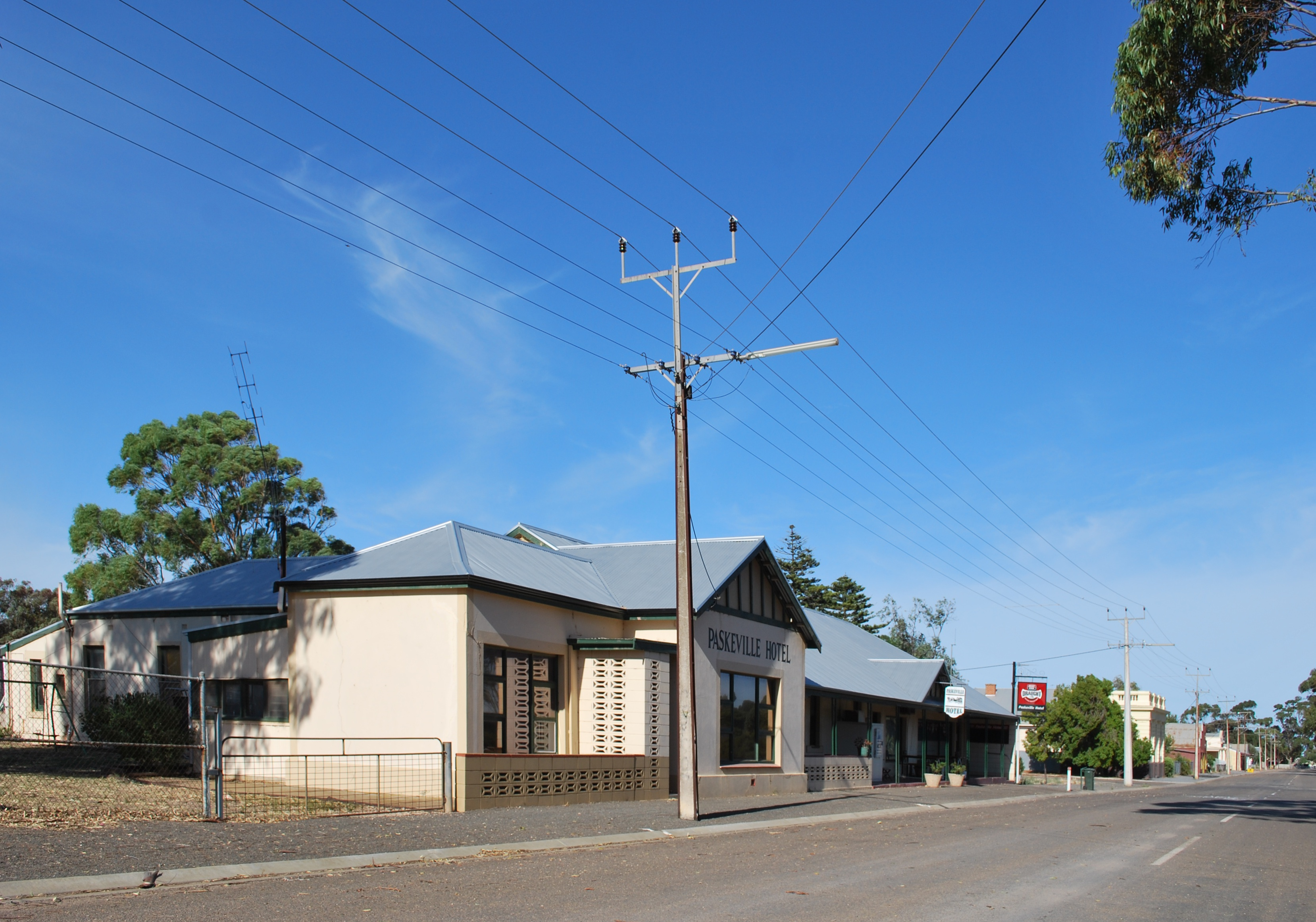
- Main street of Paskeville, with the Paskeville Hotel in the foreground, 2010. The hotel burned down in 2012.

- Coordinates: 34°02′20″S 137°54′8″E
- Country: Australia
- State: South Australia
- LGAs: Copper Coast; Barunga West
- Location: 20 km (12 mi) E of Kadina

Government
  - State electorate: Narungga
  - Federal division: Grey
- Elevation: 123 m (404 ft)

Population
  - Total: 149 (SAL 2021)
- Postcode: 5552
Localities around Paskeville
Kadina	Bute	Lochiel
Moonta	Paskeville	Kulpara
Arthurton

Paskeville is a town on South Australia's Yorke Peninsula. It is located approximately 20 km east of Kadina on the Copper Coast Highway towards Adelaide. At the 2016 census, Paskeville had a population of 178. The town's district is administratively divided between the Copper Coast Council and the District Council of Barunga West.

== History ==
Paskeville is within the traditional lands of the indigenous Narungga people. The first European explorers to traverse the Northern Yorke Peninsula were John Hill and Thomas Burr, on horseback. On 28 April 1840 they camped overnight near present-day Paskeville and later reported they had discovered extensive fertile land there. The area known as Green's Plains, after John Green who established a sheep station there in 1851, was soon occupied by sheep graziers, who held occupation licences until closer settlement came two decades later.

The Hundred of Kulpara was proclaimed on 12 June 1862. Surveys soon followed, including the surveyed township of Kulpara. The District Council of Green's Plains was established in 1871 bringing local administration to the hundreds of Kulpara and Kadina. Pioneer farmers cleared the land for cropping, but there was no town at Paskeville until 1878, when a station was established on the new Port Wakefield to Kadina railway. The surveyed town which surrounded this station was on 4 March 1880 named after General Edward Hanson Paske, brother-in-law of the incumbent Governor, Sir William Jervois.

Paskeville was located on the Balaklava-Moonta railway line. The railway yards at Paskeville were soon busily thronged by local farmers with transhipments of bagged wheat and barley, as well as wool. Goods sheds were built in 1887, while silos were built later for bulk grain handling. These products were generally exported through the port of Wallaroo. The township also provided commercial and community support services, including churches, a school, a grocer and baker, and a hotel (originally named the Railway Hotel). Gaslight came to Paskeville in 1903, a new post office in 1925, and a 32-volt power supply until 1953. The township thrived for a time, but the closure of the railway in the 1980s, plus better roads and shopping options, eventually stalled its growth.

A water reservoir was constructed near Paskeville in the 1890s. It was supplied with water by a main pipeline derived from the Beetaloo Reservoir via the Barunga Reservoir, a slightly larger storage constructed further north and connected by 28.25 miles (45.46 km) of 16-inch (410 mm) steel pipe. The Paskeville Reservoir could hold 10,000,000 imperial gallons (45 megalitres) of water, which could then be distributed to the towns of Wallaroo, Kadina and Moonta, as well as down the Yorke Peninsula. In the 1960s, Paskeville also received water from the River Murray via the Swan Reach-Paskeville pipeline.

=== Bikie shooting ===
In February 2008, a Kadina man was lured to Paskeville where he was ambushed by four men and shot at least 15 times at close range, before driving to the Paskeville Hotel. The offenders fled, leaving the man in a critical condition. Remarkably, he survived. The victim was linked to the shooting death of a bikie gang member at Wallaroo in May 2004, for which he had been tried and acquitted. The hotel burnt down in 2012, and the owners decided not to rebuild it.

== Geography and climate ==
The original geography of Northern Yorke Peninsula was of scrub-covered undulating plains, almost devoid of watercourses. Since European settlement the scrub has mostly been cleared, with the exception of roadside remnants, leaving a dominant landscape of undulating grain fields. Paskeville is sited upon a plateau which, although low-lying, affords clear and distant views in certain directions across the surrounding region. The geology, which is dominated by limestone overlaid by ancient sand dunes, was quickly exhausted by pioneer cropping, but modern farming methods and fertilisers make this a highly productive food bowl. The area has a dry Mediterranean climate with seasonal temperatures a few degrees above those in Adelaide.

== Yorke Peninsula Field Days ==
Paskeville biennially hosts the Yorke Peninsula Field Days, a three-day field day with a major focus on agriculture and the future. The event also offers a variety of displays designed to be of interest to both rural and urban families. The event, which began in 1895, has since 1975 been held on a permanent site approximately 3 km west of the township.

== Gallery ==
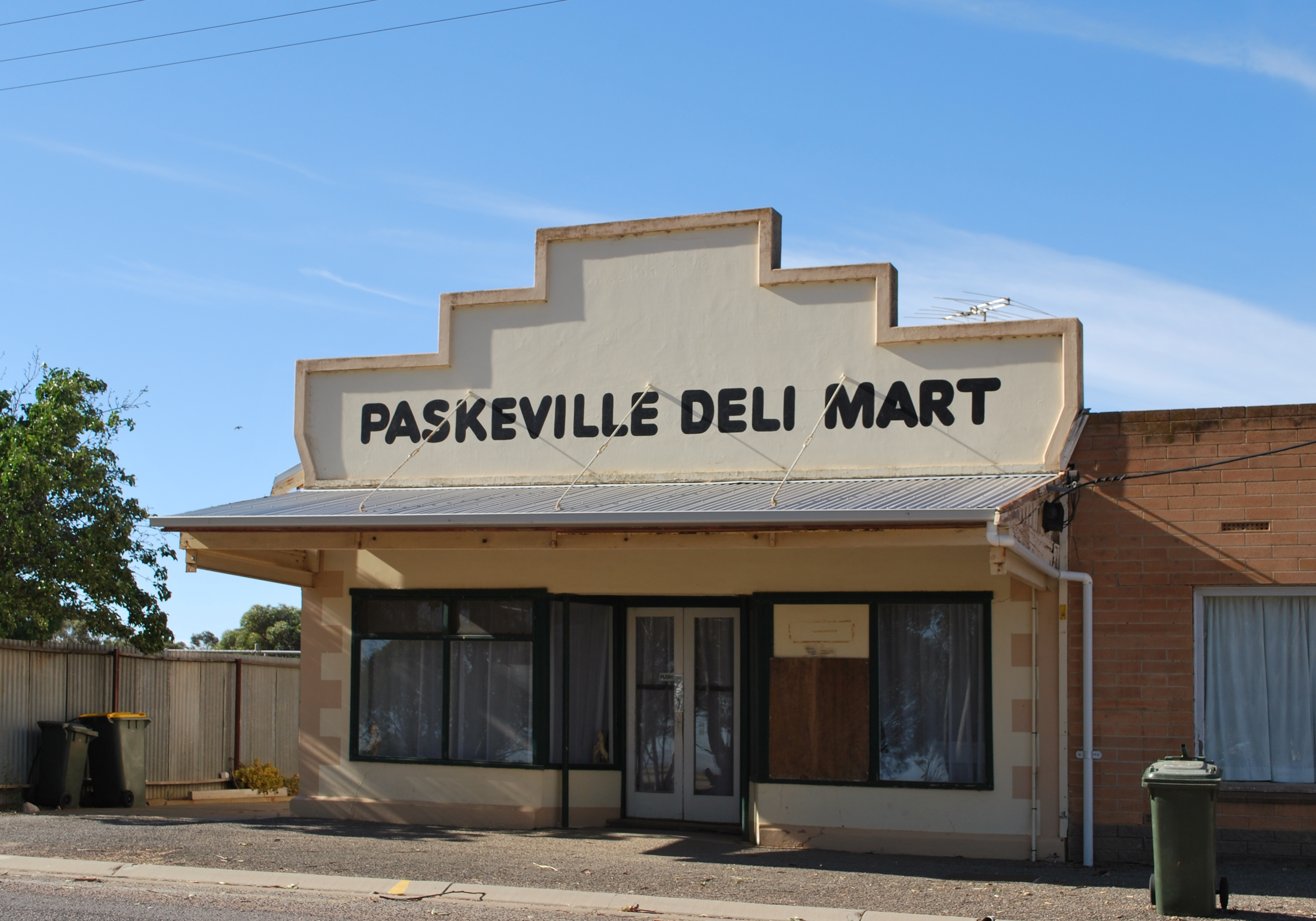
Former shop, 2010

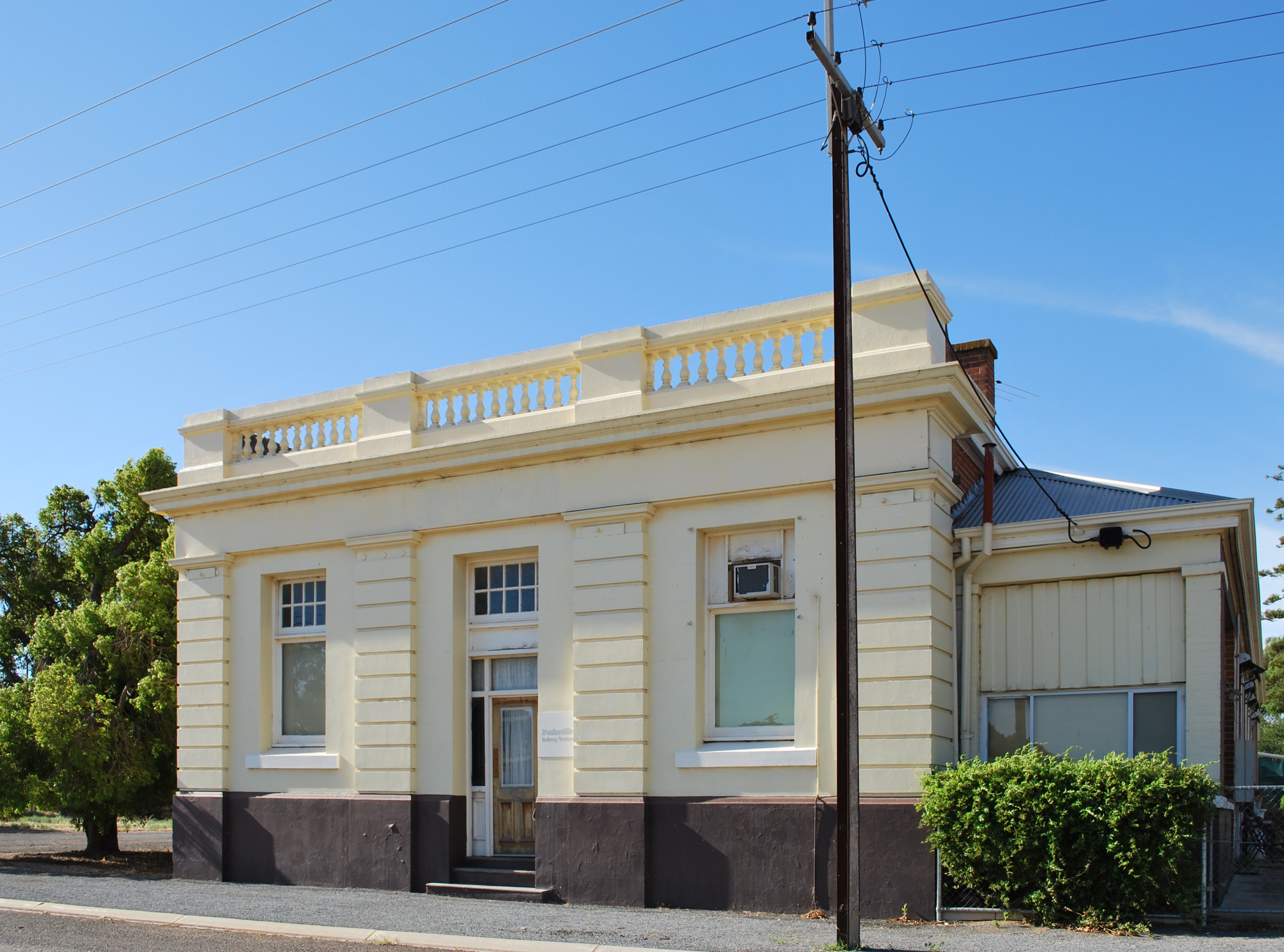
Former bank, 2010

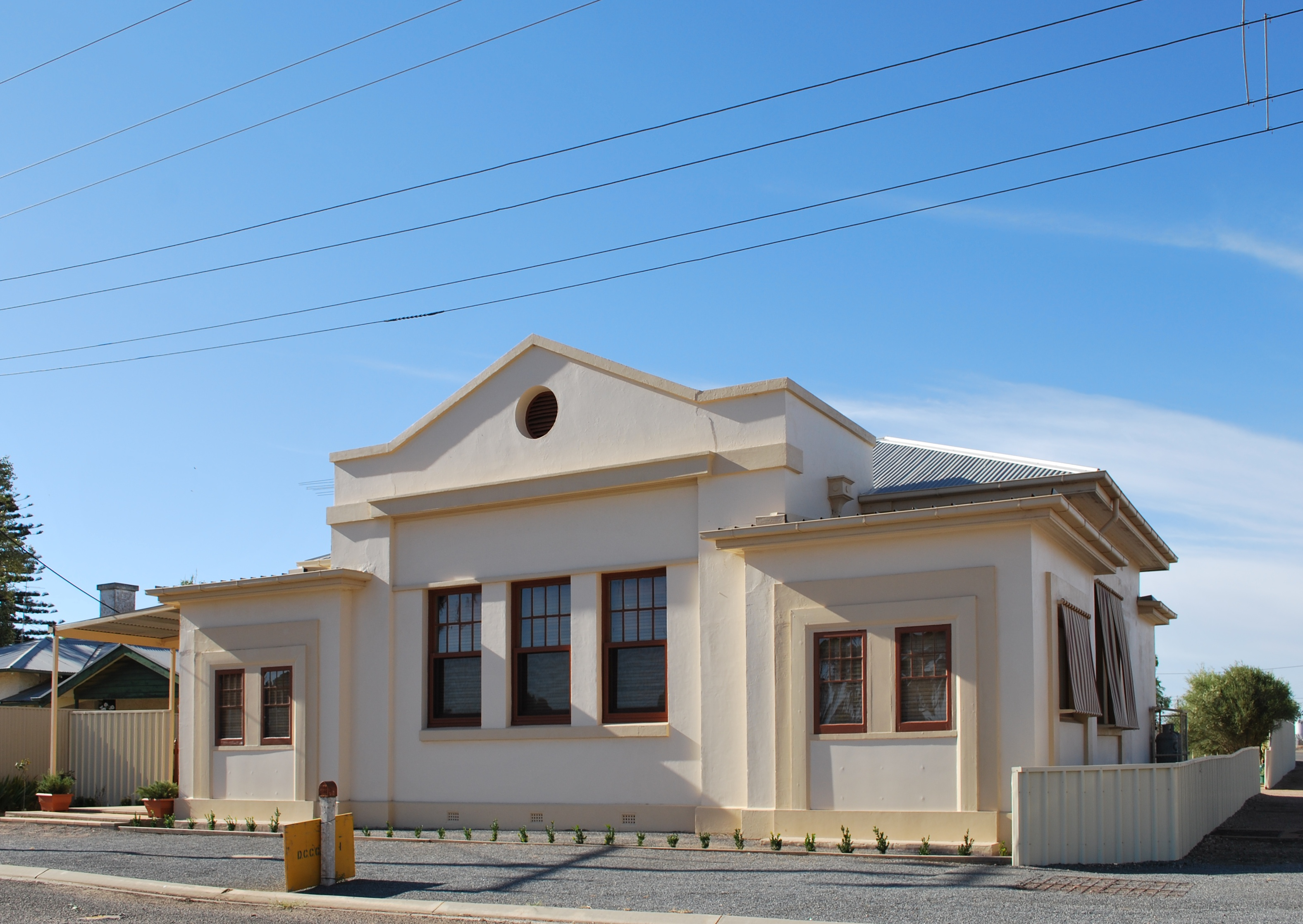
Former court house, 2010

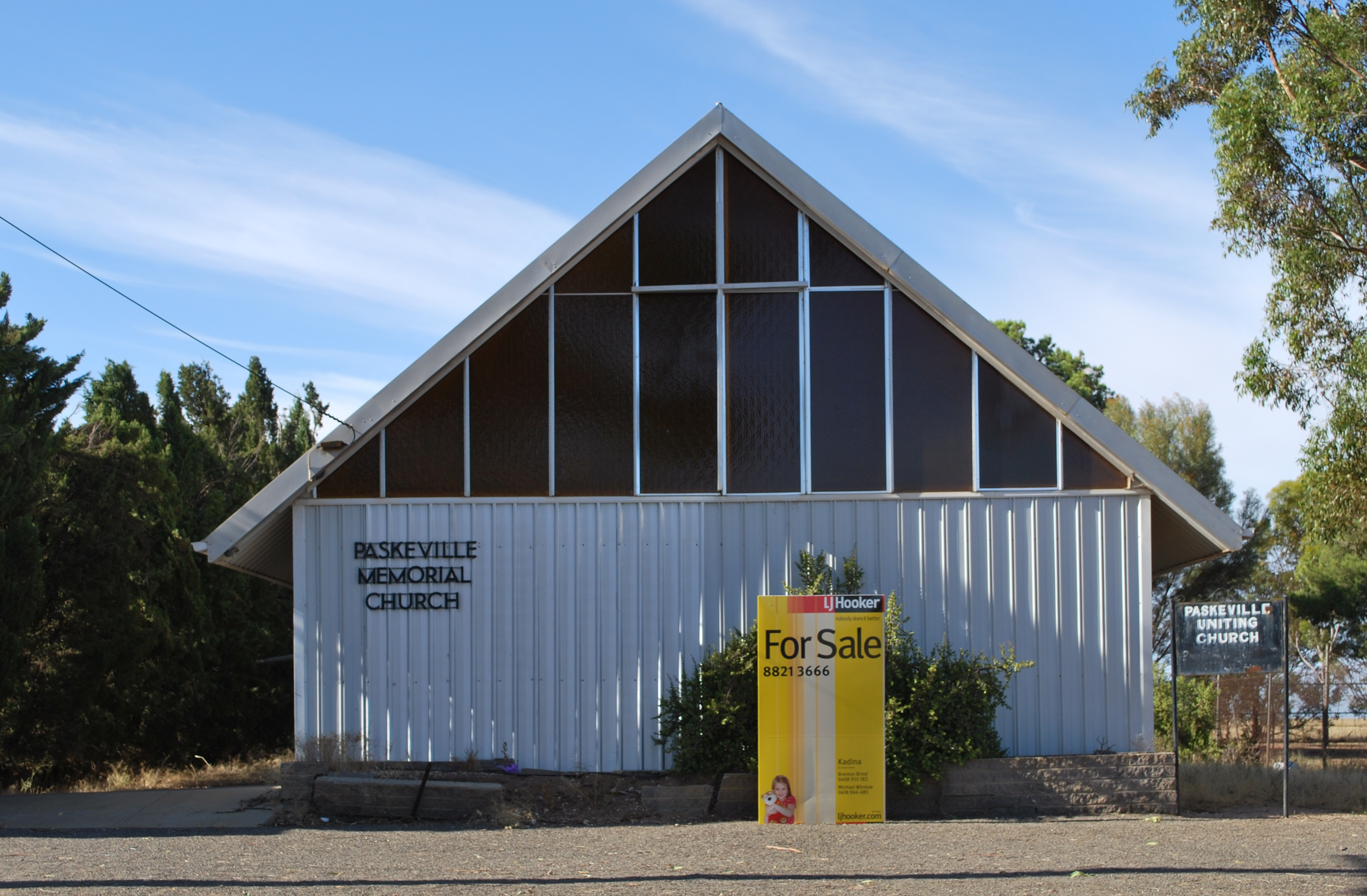
Former Uniting church, 2010

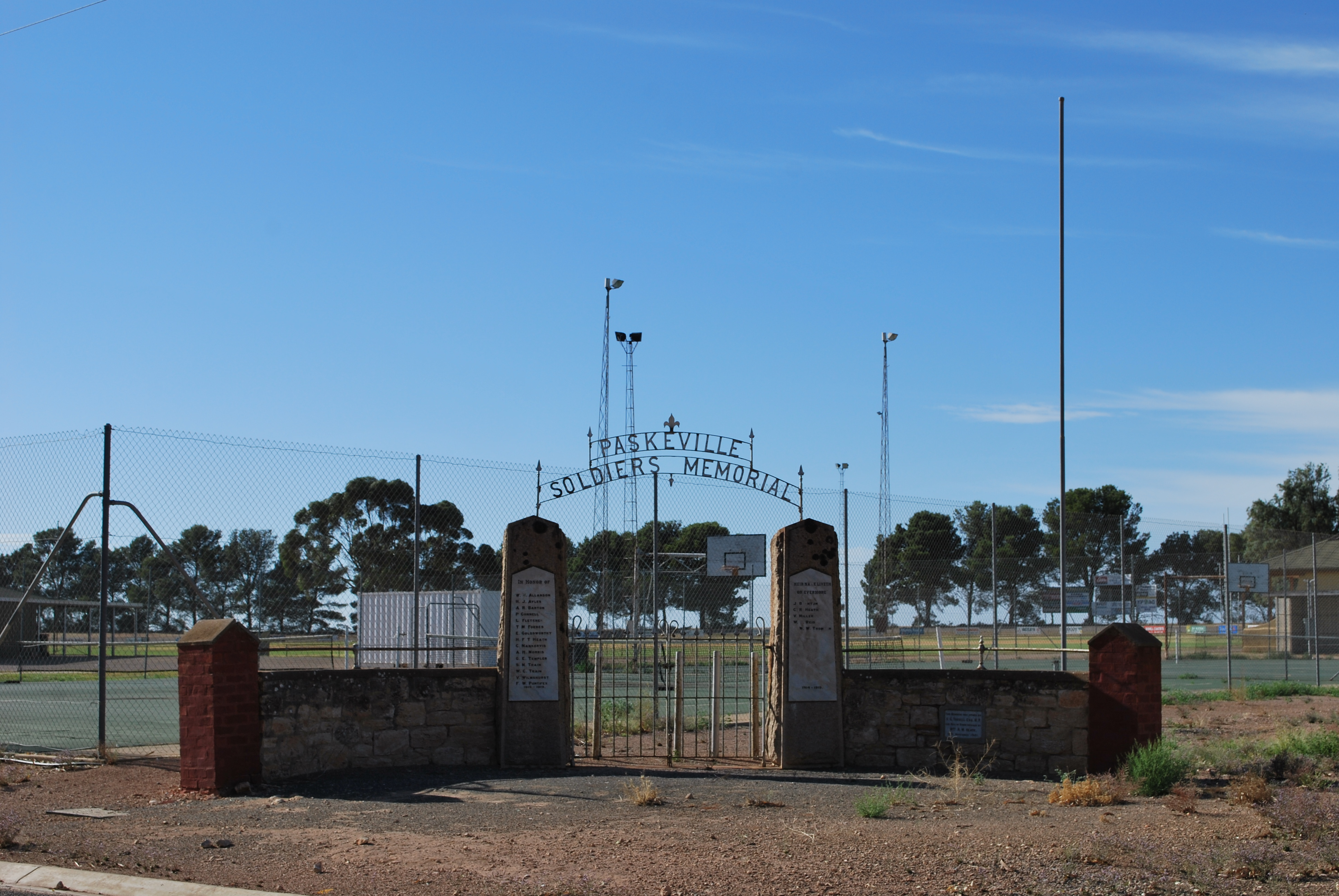
War memorial, 2010
