= Morgan Whyalla pipeline =

1940 engineering project

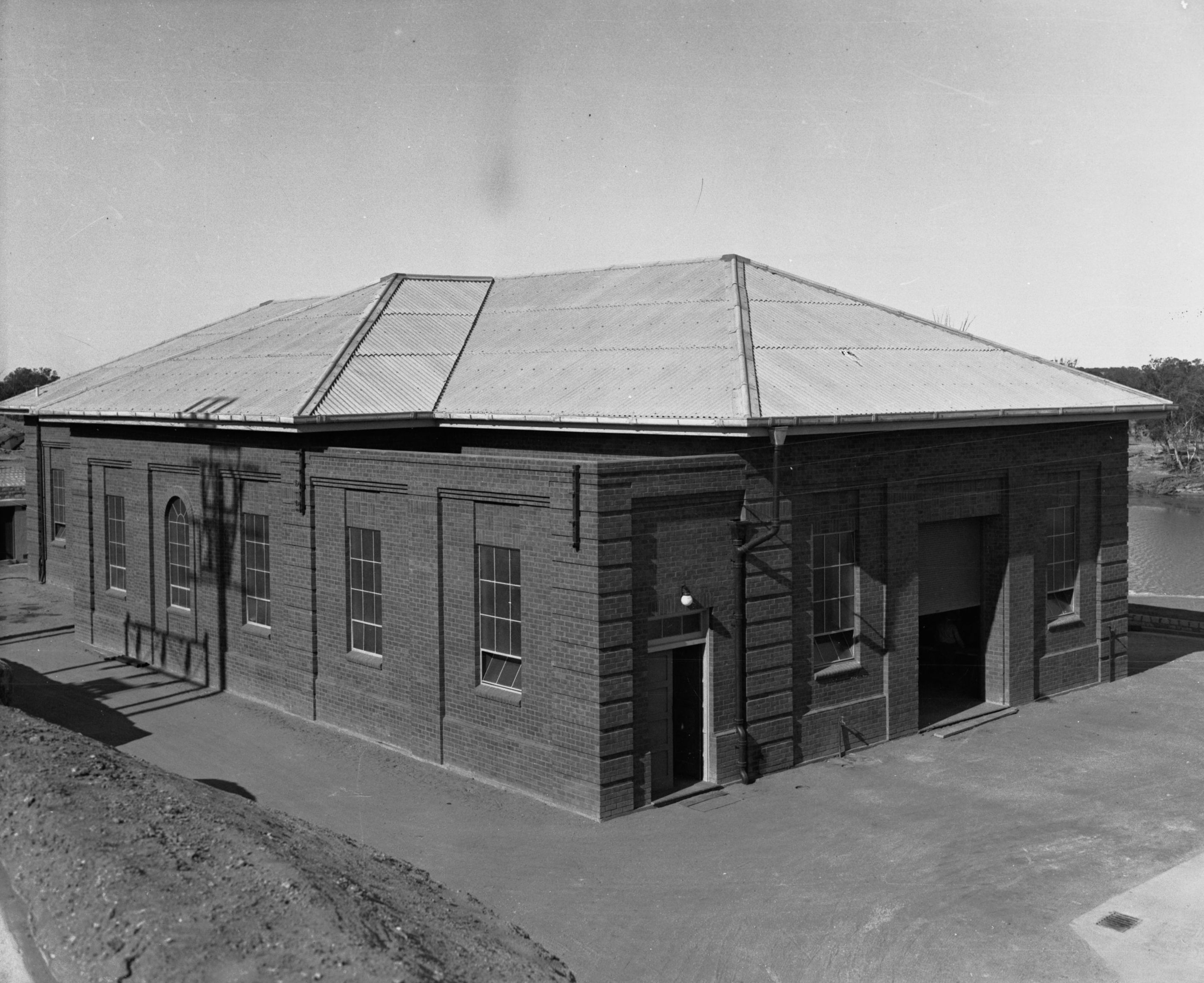
- Pumping Station at Morgan

Location
- Country: Australia
- State: South Australia
- Coordinates: 34.022°S 139.686°E
- Direction: Southeast–northwest
- Start: Morgan
- To: Whyalla

General information
- Type: water
- Status: Operational
- Owner: SA Water
- Operator: SA Water
- Pipe manufacturer: Hume Pipe Company
- Construction started: 1940
- Commissioned: 1944

Technical information
- Length: 223 mi (359 km)
- Diameter: 30–21 in (762–533 mm)
- No. of pumping stations: 4
- Pumping stations: Morgan, Beatty, Geranium Plains, Robertstown

The Morgan – Whyalla pipeline is a water pipeline in South Australia bringing water from the town of Morgan on the River Murray to the industrial city of Whyalla.

The pipeline was constructed by the Government of South Australia in 1940, with a second pipeline, running on a divergent route, added in the 1960s.

== History ==
In 1937 Premier of South Australia Richard Butler negotiated with BHP to erect a blast furnace at Whyalla to process iron ore from Iron Knob using brown coal from Leigh Creek. Lack of sufficient fresh water was an obstacle, To this end Butler pushed through enabling legislation and sent engineers to Western Australia to inspect their achievements in above-ground pipelines, notably the Goldfields pipeline engineered by C. Y. O'Connor. In 1938 Premier Thomas Playford increased the demands on BHP, and came to an agreement with Essington Lewis that if the company were to install a tinplate manufacturing plant, the State would supply the water infrastructure. Playford reckoned on the proposed pipeline also supplying the needs of Commonwealth Railways at Port Augusta for their Trans Australian and Adelaide-Port Augusta railway lines. Prime Minister Lyons agreed to help South Australia with a development loan.

In 1939 Lyons died and was replaced by Robert Menzies; shortly after, World War II broke out and Menzies joined with Britain in declaring war on Germany. Under the changed circumstances, Playford renegotiated the deal in terms of shipbuilding rather than tinplate manufacture. In 1940 the Commonwealth Water Agreement Ratification Act was passed, complementary legislation passed through South Australia's parliament and South Australia's Engineering and Water Supply Department was given the task of getting the job done, under considerable pressure from the War Department, and with reduced manpower and materials due to exigencies of wartime. The first stage, from Whyalla to the Baroota Reservoir, was rushed through to help supply water for shipping. The whole route, using continuously welded steel pipe (supplied by Hume Pipe Company), four pumping stations and 127 concrete storage tanks, was completed in 1944, just in time to alleviate a serious drought that had hit the Mid North of South Australia. The pipeline was officially opened by the Governor of South Australia, Sir Malcolm Barclay-Harvey in 1945.

Originally, the only water treatment was filtering at the intake, which could leave the water looking milky due to suspended colloidal clay. Over the years, the treatment processes have improved, with the Morgan Water treatment Plant opened in 1986. In 2016, water from the Morgan treatment plant was judged by the Water Industry Operators Association of Australia as the best tasting tap water in South Australia. Morgan won the award again in 2017. A further upgrade including larger storage and upgraded filtration and disinfection was conducted in 2018.

== Description ==
Morgan is situated at a point on the Murray where the river changes from its westerly course to almost due south. The pipeline begins at a pumping station 2 miles (3.2 km) upstream from Morgan at the most north-westerly point of the river. Here a large concrete chamber was constructed, the floor of which is below the river's low water level, and the walls of which rise to above the flood level. The chamber is somewhat elliptical in shape and is divided by a wall across the smaller diameter; one half housing the pumps and the other containing the screening machinery. The concrete walls of the chamber are over a metre thick to give it sufficient weight to prevent it floating during a flood. A control room above the chamber houses the switch board, instruments and a diesel stand-by generator.

Water is drawn from the river and passed through rotary screens with a fine wire mesh of 200 openings to the inch (80 per cm). This was originally the only filtration and removed all solid matter except colloidal clay, which when present gave rise to a milky appearance. The water received no other treatment, and its salinity and hardness were less than that of Mundaring water which is used in the comparable Goldfields pipeline. The centrifugal pumps were driven by 400 h.p. (300 kW) electric motors, the power for which was originally supplied from the Osborne Power Station, and later from Port Augusta. Each pump station is now connected directly to the ElectraNet transmission grid. The transformers were upgraded in 2015–2016.

Each pumping station fills receiving tanks elevated by 400 feet (120 m) Each intermediate pump is at a lower elevation than the previous storage tank, so the centrifugal pumps run with a flooded inlet and do not require priming. The last pumping station near Robertstown operates into the Hanson storage tanks, which are 1,558 feet (475 m) above sea level and 57 miles (92 km) from Morgan. From Morgan to No. 4 pumping station the pipe passes through arid country; after that it passes through good agricultural land and thence through the Flinders Ranges at Hughes Gap. The pipe then follows the eastern side of Spencer Gulf to Port Augusta and after rounding the head of the gulf continues southward to Whyalla, again passing through arid country. The route was chosen to pass close to all the main reservoirs in the Mid North of South Australia, so that they could be supplied with River Murray water. From the Hanson tanks the water gravitates all the way to Whyalla, a distance of 166 miles (267 km). The total length of the pipeline is 223 miles (359 km) and the pipes, which are of steel, concrete lined and protected against external corrosion by "galvanite", a proprietary zinc coating, vary in size from 30 inches (760 mm) to 21 inches (530 mm).

The South Australian engineers followed the practice of the Goldfields Water Supply in adopting continuous welding of the pipes. This was soon vindicated when floods hit Port Augusta and Whyalla, causing damage to roads, bridges and the pipeline. At one place, where the water had swept across the road and piled timber up against the pipeline a length of pipe 80 m. between concrete blocks had been bowed outward by over a metre, but had not broken. In another place an 80 m. length of pipe had been completely undermined, and the pipe had sagged about a metre, being dragged down by a large concrete block, weighing about three tonnes, which was left suspended. Close to the block the pipe had buckled, and twisted through 180 degrees without fracture. Two breaks had occurred in the pipeline during the flood, both at places where it was carried over creeks on concrete road bridges. These bridges had been undermined and swept away, carrying the pipe with them. Repairs were made as soon as the flood subsided, and the supply to Whyalla was restored within ten days.

Water from the Morgan water treatment plant supplies over 130,000 people across the Mid North region of South Australia from Burra and Clare, South Australia across to central Eyre Peninsula.

== Solar power ==
Commencing in 2019, the pumping stations are being fitted with solar panel arrays to reduce the cost of pumping water. The first of these was commissioned at Pumping Station Number 3 near Geranium Plains. The second will be at Pumping Station number 4 near Robertstown. The ground under the solar panel arrays will be planted with native grasses and ground covers to suppress dust.

== Related pipelines ==
A second Morgan–Whyalla pipeline was commenced in 1963 and completed in 1967. It was made considerably shorter by passing the last section under Spencer Gulf rather than around it.

A similar project, the Mannum–Adelaide pipeline, began in 1949 and was completed in 1955, just in time to avert a serious water shortage.

== See also ==
- Whyalla Steelworks
- SA Water
- Mannum–Adelaide pipeline

== Sources ==
- Hammerton, Marianne Water South Australia Wakefield Press, Adelaide 1986 ISBN 0 949268 75 5
