= Port Arthur, South Australia =

Port Arthur South Australia
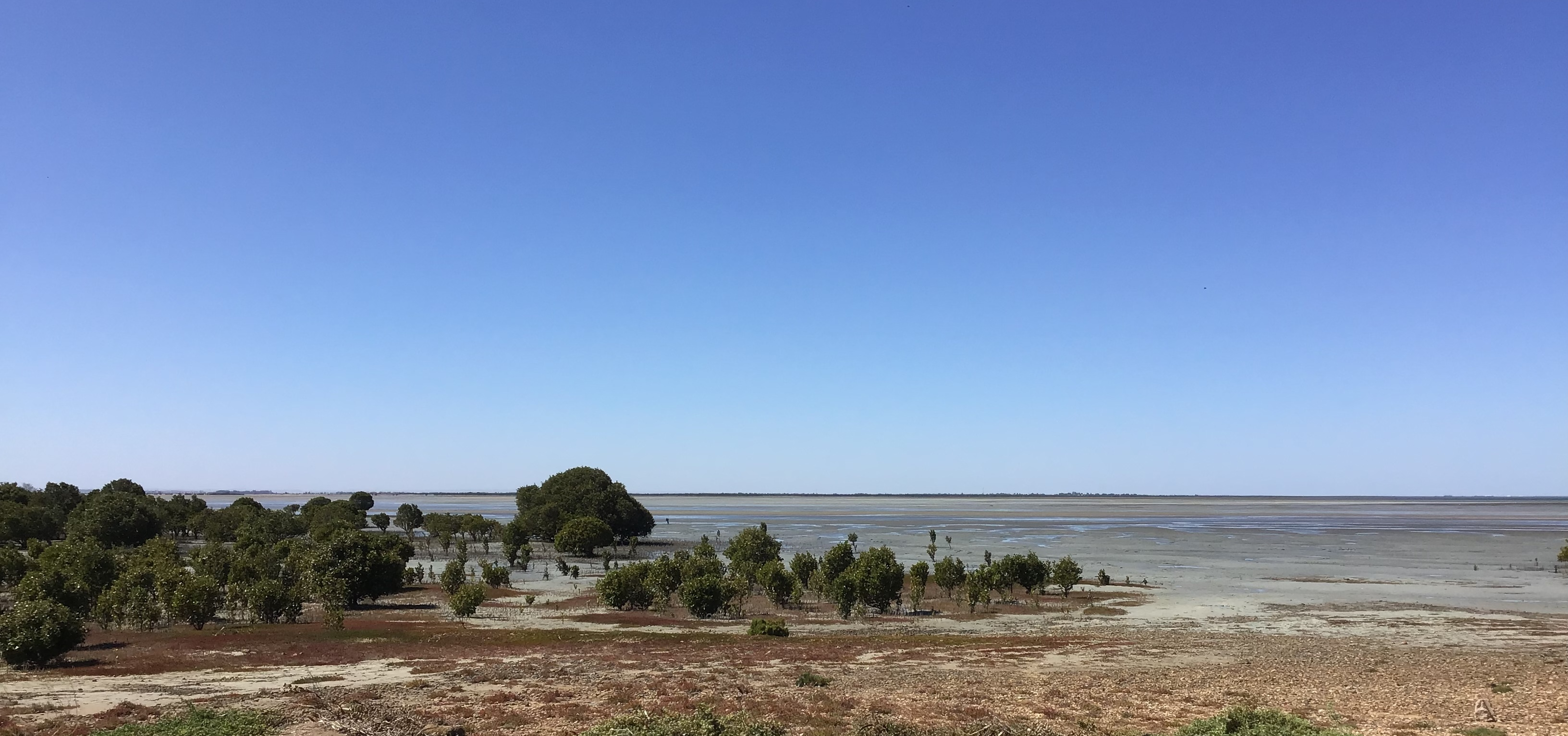
- Mangroves and intertidal flats at Port Arthur in the Clinton Conservation Park

- Coordinates: 34°08′56″S 138°03′49″E
- Population: 0 (SAL 2021)
- Established: 1999
- Postcode(s): 5552
- Time zone: ACST (UTC+9:30)
  - Summer (DST): ACST (UTC+10:30)
- Location: 105 km (65 mi) NW of Adelaide; 9 km (6 mi) NW of Port Wakefield
- LGA(s): Yorke Peninsula Council
- Region: Yorke and Mid North
- County: Daly
- State electorate(s): Narungga
- Federal division(s): Grey
Localities around Port Arthur:
Kulpara	South Hummocks	Beaufort
Kainton; Kulpara	Port Arthur	Beaufort; Port Wakefield
Kainton	Gulf St Vincent	Port Wakefield
- Footnotes: Adjoining localities

Port Arthur is a locality in the Australian state of South Australia located on the Yorke Peninsula at the northern end of Gulf St Vincent about 105 kilometres (65 miles) north west of the state capital of Adelaide and about 9 kilometres (5.6 miles) north of the town of Port Wakefield.

Its boundaries were created in May 1999 for the "long established name." Port Arthur was used from 1861 to 1863 as a minor port for an enterprise moving passengers between Port Adelaide and the towns of Moonta and Wallaroo using the steam tug, Eleanor, and coach services operated by both "Mr Opie's Horse Conveyances" and W. Rounsevell.

Port Arthur is located within the federal Division of Grey, the state electoral district of Narungga, and the local government area of the Yorke Peninsula Council.

== See also ==
- List of cities and towns in South Australia
- Clinton Conservation Park

== Notes and references ==
Notes

Citations
