= Lake Bumbunga =

Salt lake in South Australia

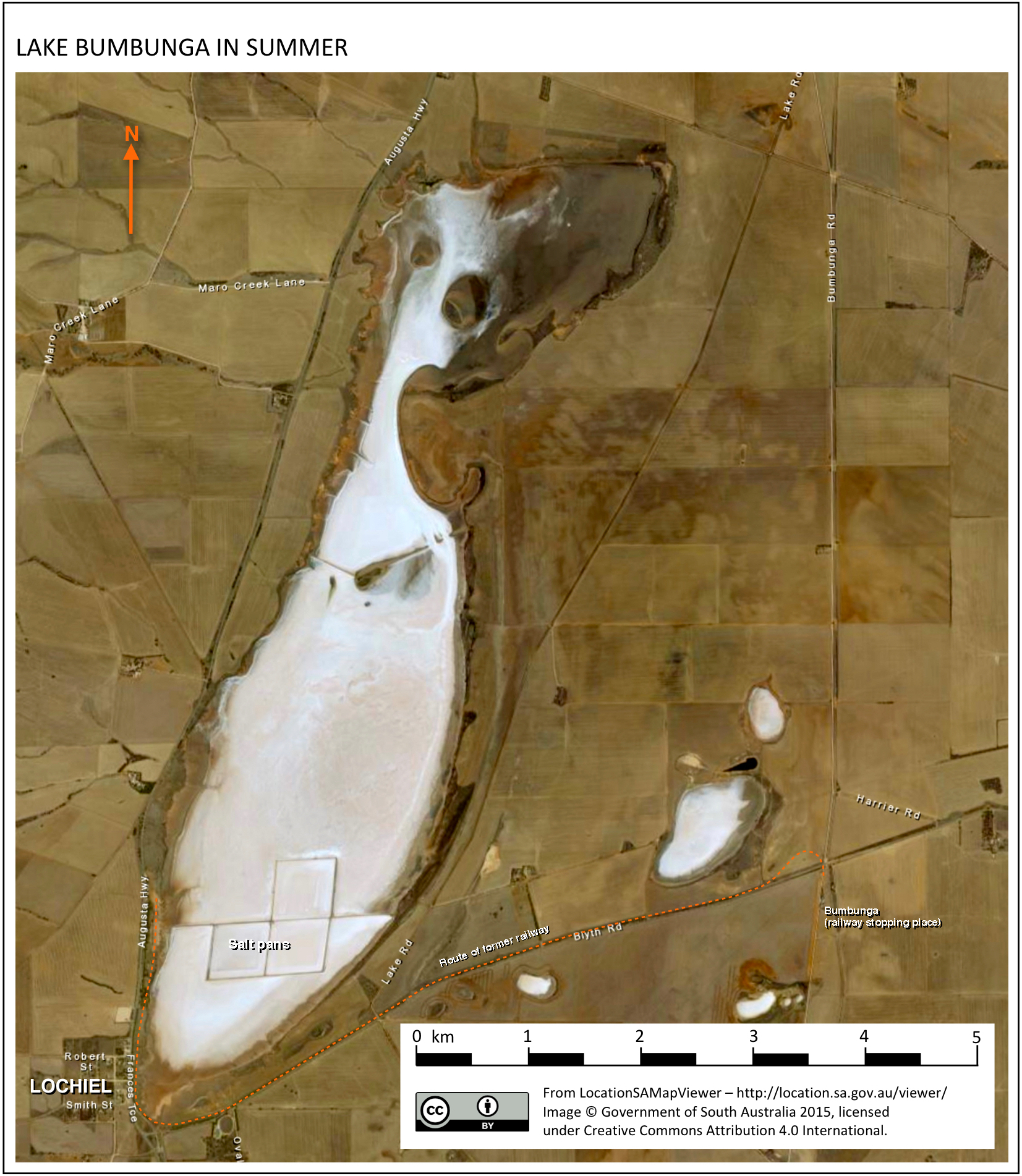
- Satellite view of 15 square km Lake Bumbunga in summer, when the water level is at its lowest (click to enlarge)

- Location in South Australia
- Location: Mid North region, South Australia
- Coordinates: 33°54′S 138°11′E
- Type: Salt lake
- Basin countries: Australia
- Surface area: 13.88 km^{2} (5.36 sq mi)

Lake Bumbunga is a salt lake in the Mid North of the state of South Australia, between the town of Lochiel and the farming locality of Bumbunga, approximately 125 km (78 mi) from Adelaide. It is a pink lake, with its colour due to certain algae.

Salt has been mined there almost continuously since 1881, and it has become a tourist attraction, along with its "Loch Eel Monster" sculpture in the middle of it.

== History ==
The lake lies in the traditional lands of the Kaurna people.

According to anthropologist Norman Tindale, the name Bumbunga derives from the word parnpangka in the Kaurna language, meaning "rain water lake".

== Description ==
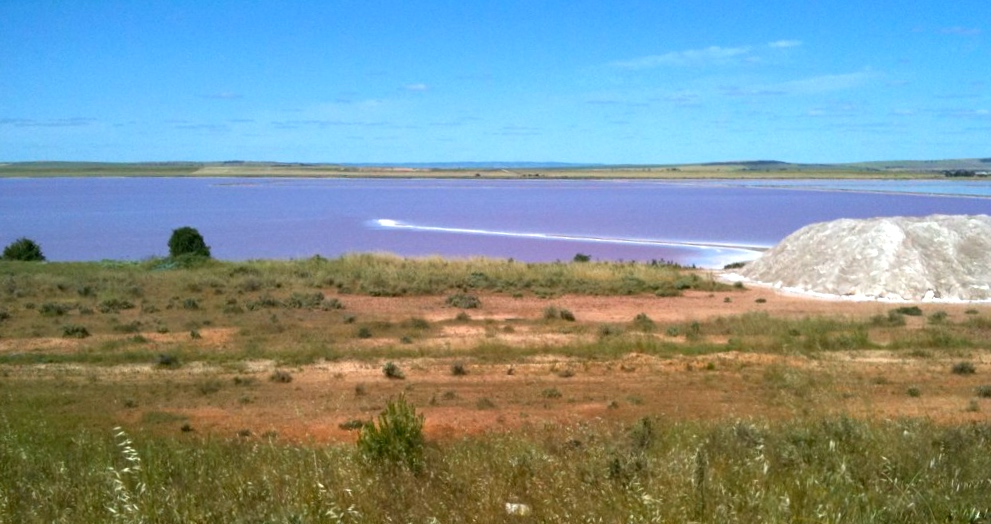
View looking east from Hwy 1 rest stop, late spring 2010

The lake is situated in the Mid North of South Australia, approximately 125 km (78 mi) from the state capital city, Adelaide. Easily visible from Highway 1 for a distance of 10 km (6.2 mi), the 15-square-kilometre (5.8 sq mi) Lake Bumbunga is a dramatic departure from the surrounding landscape due to its seasonal pink colouration and wide expanse. The colour is due to a certain type of algae which tolerates its high salinity and produces pink pigment that helps it to take energy. The colour changes throughout the year; it is often pinker in spring than winter, owing to more fresh water bringing nutrients to the algae and increased sunlight compared to the winter months. Summers are dry and the water evaporates.

The lake is the largest of a system of Quaternary Holocene saline lakes extending about 30 km (19 mi) north of Lochiel, draining an area to the east of the Barunga Range, where it merges with the Hummock Range. Salt is dissolved from saline mud produced when winter rain fills the lake. Each summer a large portion of the lake dries up.

== Salt harvesting ==
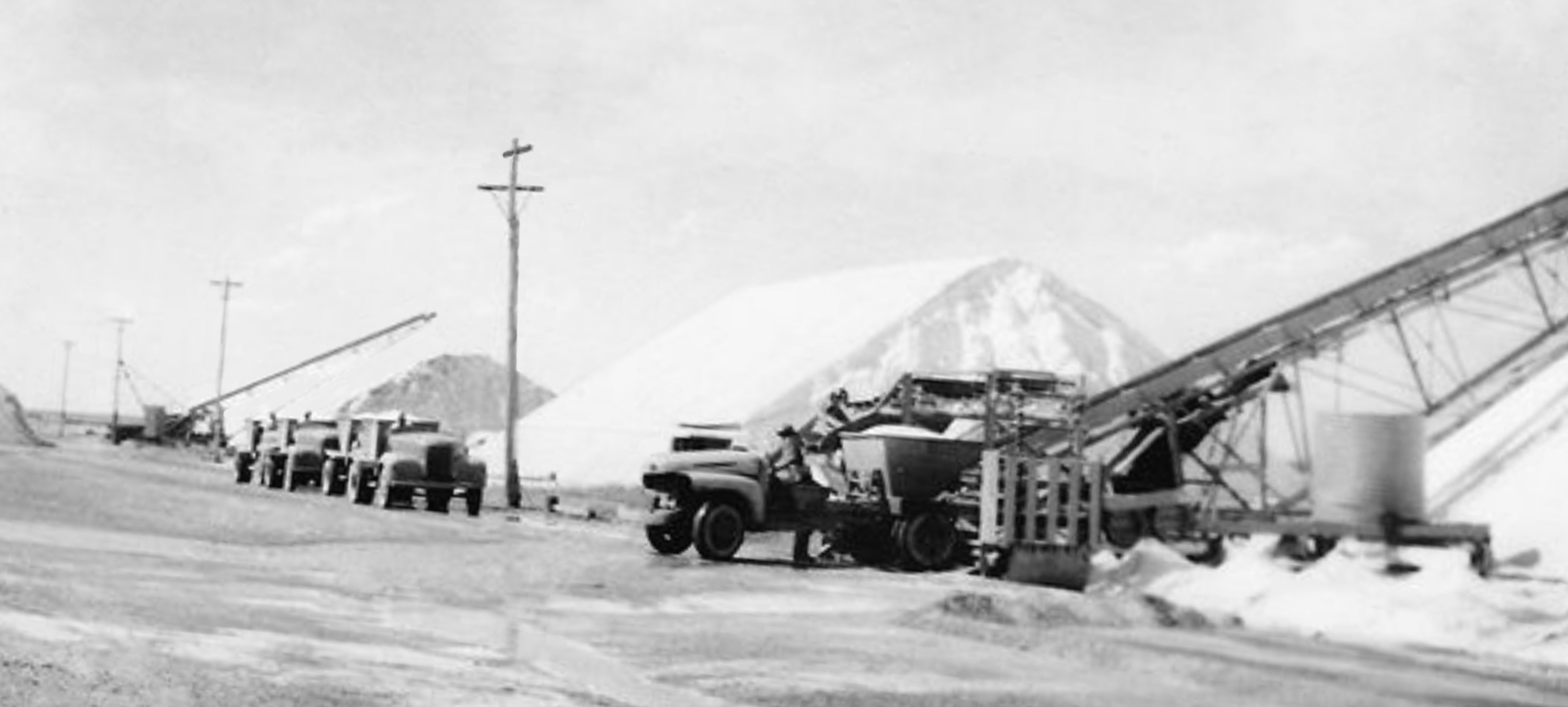
Salt harvesting at Lake Bumbunga in the late 1940s

Salt is precipitated from gypsum, are precipitated out at this stage. The water is then pumped into crystallising ponds, where common salt precipitates. The process is stopped before all the salt comes down in order to avoid contamination with magnesium and potassium salts. The final liquors, known as bitterns, are drained away from the salt, which is then harvested. At Lake Bumbunga, brine is pumped into three 25 hectare (62 acre) crystalliser ponds for refining.

The potential of Lake Bumbunga's shallow waters for salt harvesting was recognised in 1868. Salt was harvested from the lake bed in summer months from 1881; two years later, output was 6.1 to 8.1 tonnes (6 to 8 long tons) per day. Evaporation pans, furnaces, tank and men's quarters were built at the northern end of the lake. Mining provided employment and other economic benefits for many years; the town of Lochiel, on the west bank of the lake, is said to have "developed slowly with the industry, its survival in the 20th century being almost totally dependent on the salt harvesting". By 1910 there were at least three lease-holders scraping thousands of tons of salt from evaporation pans when the lake dried up – usually in December. In 1913, the Australian Salt Company was incorporated and held all the lake leases until 1971, when the company became a wholly owned subsidiary of Cheetham Salt Company Limited – now Cheetham Salt Limited, Australia's largest producer and refiner of solar salt. (Note: In 1992, Cheetham Salt Limited was acquired by Ridley Corporation Limited, an Australian listed company. In 2013, CK Life Sciences Int’l., (Holdings) Inc. acquired Cheetham Salt Limited.)

Efficiency of transportation was improved in 1926 after a 9 km (5.5 mi) branch line was built from the nearby Salisbury railway line, enabling transport directly to Port Adelaide. (Note: The line left the Bowmans–Snowtown section of the mainline between Adelaide and Redhill (Port Pirie after 1937) at Bumbunga passing siding (33°54′45″S 138°13′45″E). It headed south-west on the northern side of Leslie McIntyre Road (now Blyth Road), then at the southern tip of Lake Bumbunga swung north between the lake and Highway 1, terminating 1.5 km north of the town (33°54′51″S 138°09′49″E).) During World War II, when salt was need for munitions manufacture, employment rose from 30 to 100 workers, with three shifts a day, and two trains a week transported the product in bags. In 1967, 1000 tonnes a day were harvested; at that time South Australia was producing 80 per cent of Australia's salt, although that soon decreased, with major expansion of solar salt production in Western Australia. Forty years later, average annual production was reported as 10,000 tonnes (11,000 tons). From 1996 to 2012, the works closed and no salt was harvested. With harvesting becoming practicable using only front-end loaders and trucks, the maintenance and salt works buildings became redundant and were demolished in 2000.

== Tourism ==
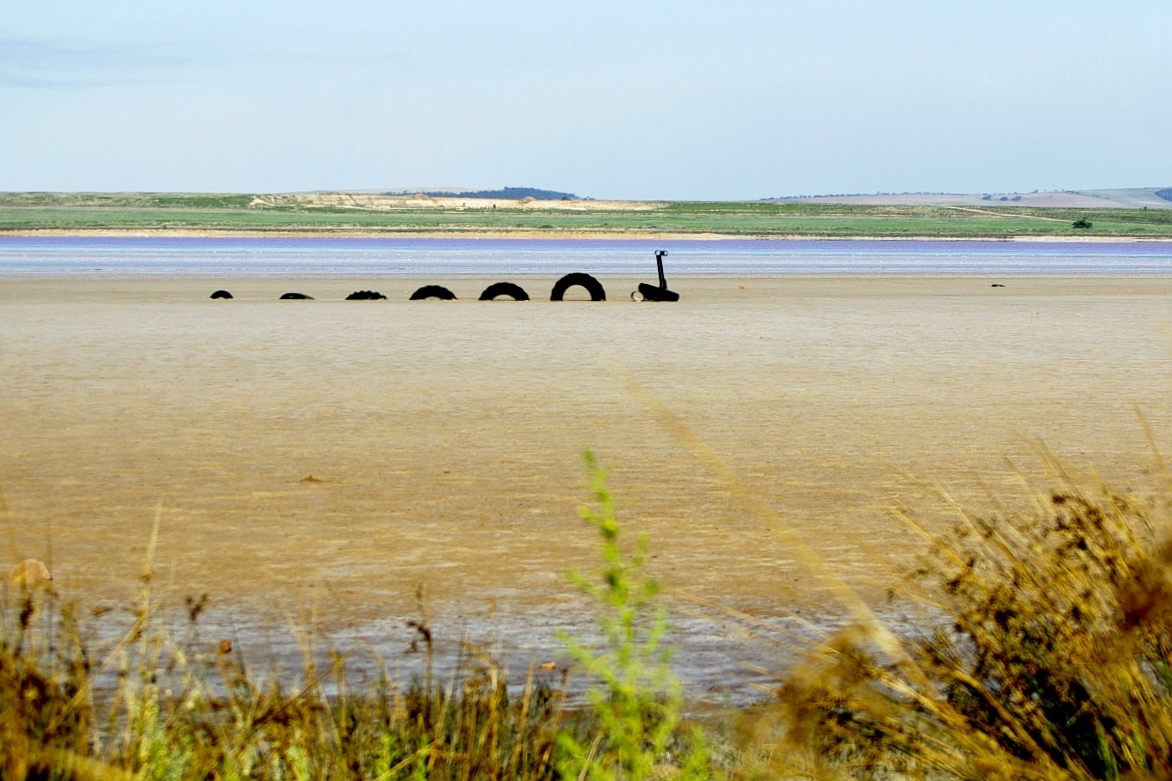
"Loch Eel", visible from the northern approaches to Lochiel

The lake is a tourist attraction owing to its pinkness, with its popularity growing in recent years, attracting stops by tourist buses.

A fibreglass sculpture named the "Loch-Eel monster" (wordplay on Lochiel, the nearest town, whose namesake is a forest in northern Scotland) is visible in the middle of the lake. The backstory for the monster harks back to a time when bullock (ox) teams were common, in the late 1880s. The story goes that bullocks were walking over the lake when they were "spooked by some sort of monster, went to the wrong part of the lake... and gradually got sucked under and went down". The original version of the monster was created from piles of old tyres, and locals called it the Loch Ness monster's cousin. After the head got stolen in 2017, work began on the fibreglass replacement.

There is a walking trail around the lake for tourists.

== Other uses ==
The lake has been used as background for advertising by R. M. Williams, Mercedes-Benz, Foxtel and others, as well as fashion shoots for the Adelaide Fashion Festival. Tim Minchin used Lake Bumbunga as a filming location for his TV series Upright, with a cast of more than 50 people on the lake.

== See also ==
- List of lakes of Australia § South Australia
