= Ninnes, South Australia =

Ninnes
- Town
- Coordinates: 33.9703°S 138.0198°E
- Country: Australia
- State: South Australia
- LGA: District Council of Barunga West
- Location: 16 km (9.9 mi) west of Lochiel; 11 km (6.8 mi) north of Kulpara; 30 km (19 mi) east of Kadina

Government
  - State electorate: Narungga
  - Federal division: Grey

Population
  - Total: 65 (SAL 2021)
- Postcode: 5560
Localities around Ninnes
	Bute
Thomas Plain	Ninnes	Lochiel
Paskeville	Kulpara	South Hummocks

Ninnes is a locality at the northeastern corner of Yorke Peninsula and western side of the Mid North of South Australia. It lies where the Upper Yorke Road from Kulpara to Bute is crossed by the road from Paskeville to Lochiel. The dominant industry is broadacre grain and sheep farming.

== History ==
The area of Ninnes Plain was settled by the early 1860s and the Hundred of Ninnes was proclaimed in 1874.

In 1876 a bushfire started in the Hummock Range and tore westwards through Ninnes Plain towards Green Plain, near the present-day township of Paskeville. According to local reportage at the time the fire was so fierce that the townships of Wallaroo and Kadina, more than 15 to 20 km (9.3 to 12.4 mi) distant, were illuminated at night by the fire's glow.

The District Council of Ninnes was established in 1885 and adopted a former accommodation house as a council chamber. The council chamber would also be used as a school until a separate building was constructed six years later.

Ninnes Post Office opened on 1 November 1882; its date of closure is unknown.

In 1910, it was reported that "while Ninnes...cannot claim to have built a town, and it is easy to count its public buildings, it is not backward in other things", citing the "substantially built and commodious homesteads" and that as one of "the outlying districts which support the towns, it is enjoying prosperity". The council seat subsequently moved to Bute, which had far outgrown Ninnes, and the council was renamed Bute in 1933.

The modern locality of Ninnes was established in 1998 when boundaries were formalised for "the long established local name". An additional area within Wakefield Regional Council was added to the locality in 2000, but removed and added to Lochiel in 2007 following requests from local residents.
