= Province of Bumbunga =

Micronation in Australia

- Micronation (unrecognized entity)
- A 1979 aerial photograph, facing north, of the Province of Bumbunga showing the gigantic strawberry patch shaped like Great Britain
- Location: Farm in Bumbunga, South Australia
- Area claimed: 0.04 km^{2} (0.015 sq mi)
- Claimed by: Alec Brackstone
- Dates claimed: 29 March 1976–c. 2000

The Province of Bumbunga (33.915°S 138.229°E) was an Australian secessionist micronation located on a farm at Bumbunga near Snowtown and Lochiel, South Australia, from 1976 until approximately 2000. Its founder and only ruler was a British monkey trainer, uranium prospector, and postmaster named Alec Brackstone.

In November 1975 the Australian Labor Party government of Prime Minister Gough Whitlam was dismissed under controversial circumstances by Governor-General John Kerr, the official governmental representative of Queen Elizabeth II. Brackstone, an ardent British monarchist, became alarmed by what he saw as a drift away from the Australian system of constitutional monarchy towards outright republicanism. To ensure that at least a portion of the Australian continent would always remain loyal to the British Crown, he declared his four-hectare property north of Adelaide to be the independent Province of Bumbunga on 29 March 1976, and appointed himself its governor-general.

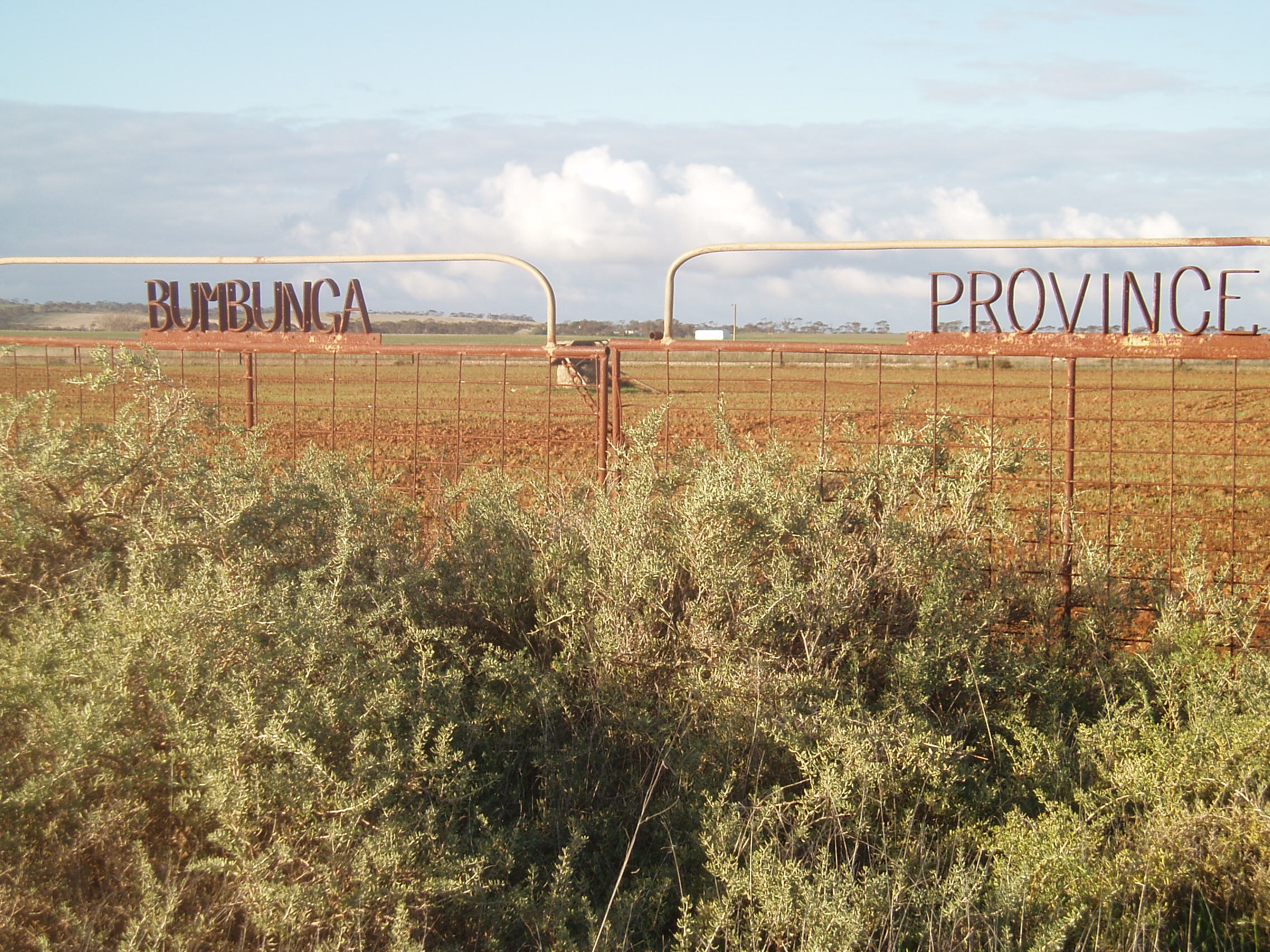
A 2006 photograph of the south western gate of the former Province of Bumbunga. This entrance faces east towards the location of Cornwall as shown in the 1979 photograph

Brackstone then set about attracting tourism by planting thousands of strawberry plants in the pattern of a huge scale model of Great Britain. He intended to conduct weddings on his property, during which soil from the appropriate British county would be sprinkled on the ground. Implementation was delayed when Australian customs authorities seized the soil Brackstone had imported from the UK, and the entire enterprise was scuttled when the strawberry fields perished during a drought.

In 1980 Bumbunga began issuing cinderella stamps portraying members of the British royal family (except Sarah, Duchess of York, whom Brackstone disliked). Later issues addressed anti-nuclear sentiments and other social causes while retaining the royal theme. Though worthless as postage, they became popular with philatelists and oddity collectors. Fifteen series of 5000 copies each were eventually produced.

In 1987 changes to Australian investment laws that reduced the attraction of philatelic investments led Brackstone to abandon his commercial operations, and Bumbunga slid into relative oblivion. In 1999 Brackstone was arrested and charged with possession of illegal firearms. His assertion of diplomatic immunity due to his status as Bumbunga's sovereign was unsuccessful but, according to Brackstone, the charges were ultimately dropped nevertheless. In 2018 Brackstone was interviewed at his residence in Clare, South Australia, still claiming to be Governor of the province.
