= Julian R. Dridan =

Australian engineer

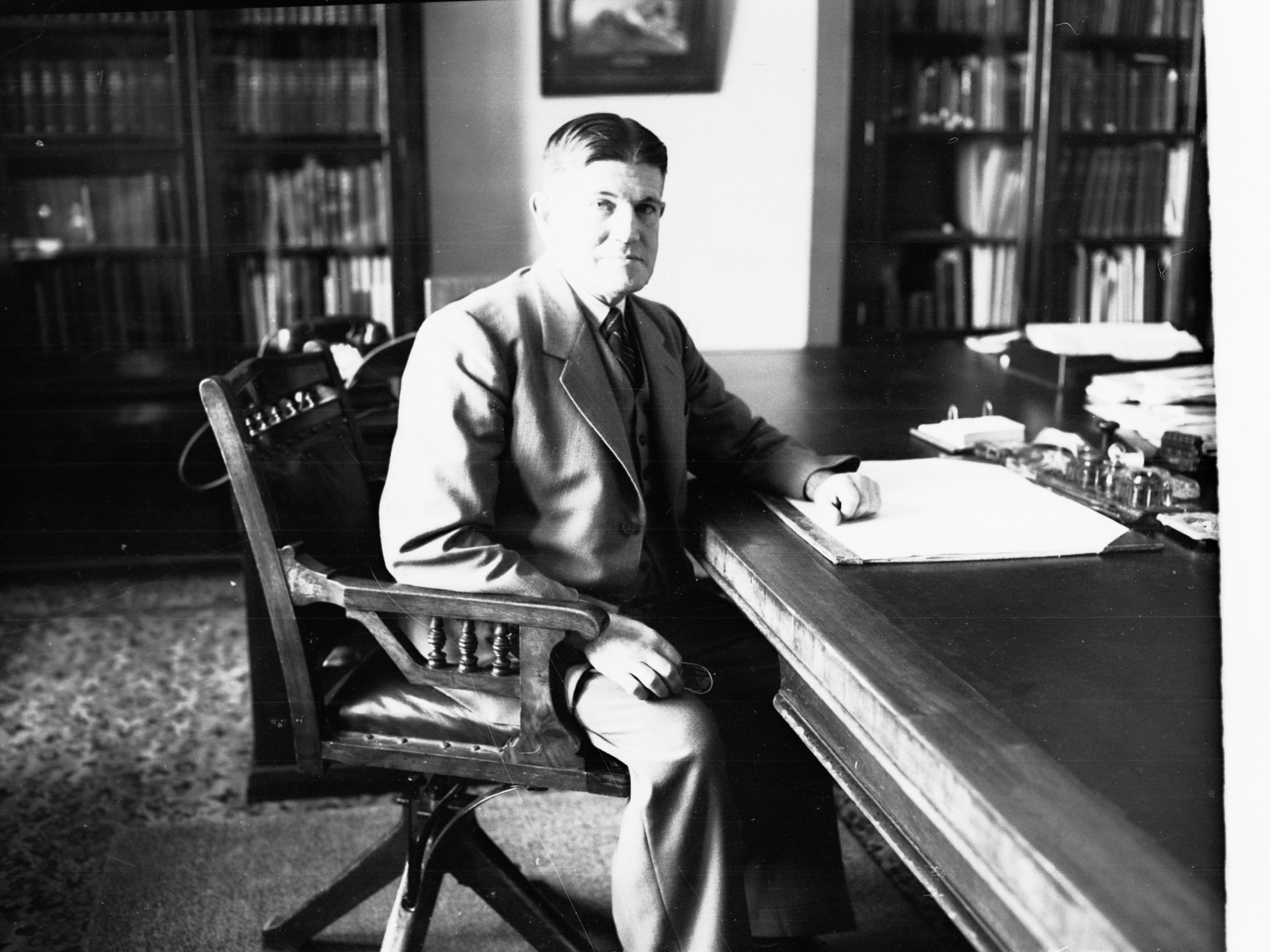
J.R. Dridan, Engineer-in-Chief of South Australia's Engineering and Water Supply Department

Julian Randal Dridan (24 November 1901 – 2 October 1982) was an Australian engineer. He was Engineer-in-Chief of South Australia's Engineering and Water Supply Department from 1949 to 1966.

== Life and career ==
Julian Randal Dridan was born 24 November 1901 in Payneham, South Australia. He was educated at Adelaide Junior Technical School, the School of Mines and the University of Adelaide. He became South Australia's Deputy Engineer-in-Chief focussing on Engineering and Water Supply. In November 1949, on his 48th birthday, he succeeded the late Mr. H. T. Angwin as Engineer-in-Chief.

He had previously reported on several proposed schemes to augment Broken Hill's water supply, including the Menindee-Stephens Creek pipeline. The scheme, with some modifications, was finally adopted following a favorable report by him. From 1965 to 1966 he was both Director and Engineer-in-Chief of South Australia's Engineering and Water Supply Department.

Dridan died 2 October 1982 in Mitcham, South Australia.

== Publications ==
- J. R. Dridan: Water conservation in South Australia. Published by K.M. Stevenson, Government Printer, Adelaide, 1946.
