= Lochiel, South Australia =

Lochiel
- Town
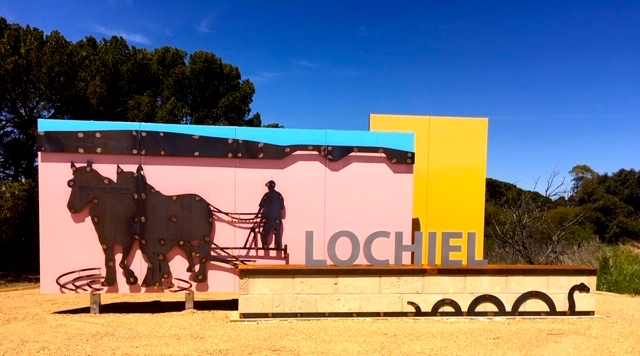
- The town entrance sign at Lochiel, depicting the seasonal pink colouration of Lake Bumbunga, the nearby hills, and horses pulling a salt scrape; the low wall in front depicts the "Loch Eel"

- Coordinates: 33°56′S 138°9′E
- Country: Australia
- State: South Australia
- LGA: Wakefield Regional Council
- Location: 125 km (78 mi) north of Adelaide

Government
  - State electorate: Narungga
  - Federal division: Grey

Population
  - Total: 104 (SAL 2021)
- Postcode: 5510
Localities around Lochiel
| Bute | Snowtown | Brinkworth |
| Ninnes | Lochiel | Bumbunga, Blyth |
| Kulpara | Port Wakefield | Nantawarra |

Lochiel is a small town in the Mid North of South Australia 125 km (78 mi) north of Adelaide. The town lies beside on the western edge of Lake Bumbunga and at the eastern foot of the Hummocks Range. The Augusta Highway, a section of Highway 1, runs on a strip between the township and the lake, which dwarfs the former.

== Name ==
In 1869 the South Australian Governor Sir James Fergusson gave the Scottish name Lochiel to the site of this planned Government Town. It is the name given to the senior line of Chiefs of Clan Cameron – the town being situated in the Hundred of Cameron, named after pioneer Hugh Cameron. (Note: Related names in Clan Cameron lands in the Scottish Highlands are those of Loch Eil [sic], a branch of the sea loch of Loch Linnhe; and the Frìth Loch Iall (or Locheil Forest).)

== History ==
The Government Town of Lochiel was surveyed in 1869, closely following the proclamation of the cadastral Hundred of Cameron. The District Councils Act 1887 declared the township and the rest of the Hundred of Cameron a part of the District Council of Port Wakefield. The following year, lobbying by residents resulted in the Hundred of Cameron being moved from the control of Wakefield council into the jurisdiction of the District Council of Snowtown, cementing a close relationship between Lochiel and Snowtown rather than the more distant Port Wakefield.

In 1976, a resident of a farm at Bumbunga, just east of Lochiel, declared a secessionist micronation, the Province of Bumbunga. By 1999 it no longer existed.

In the 2011 Australian census, the population of Lochiel and adjacent farming communities was 362.

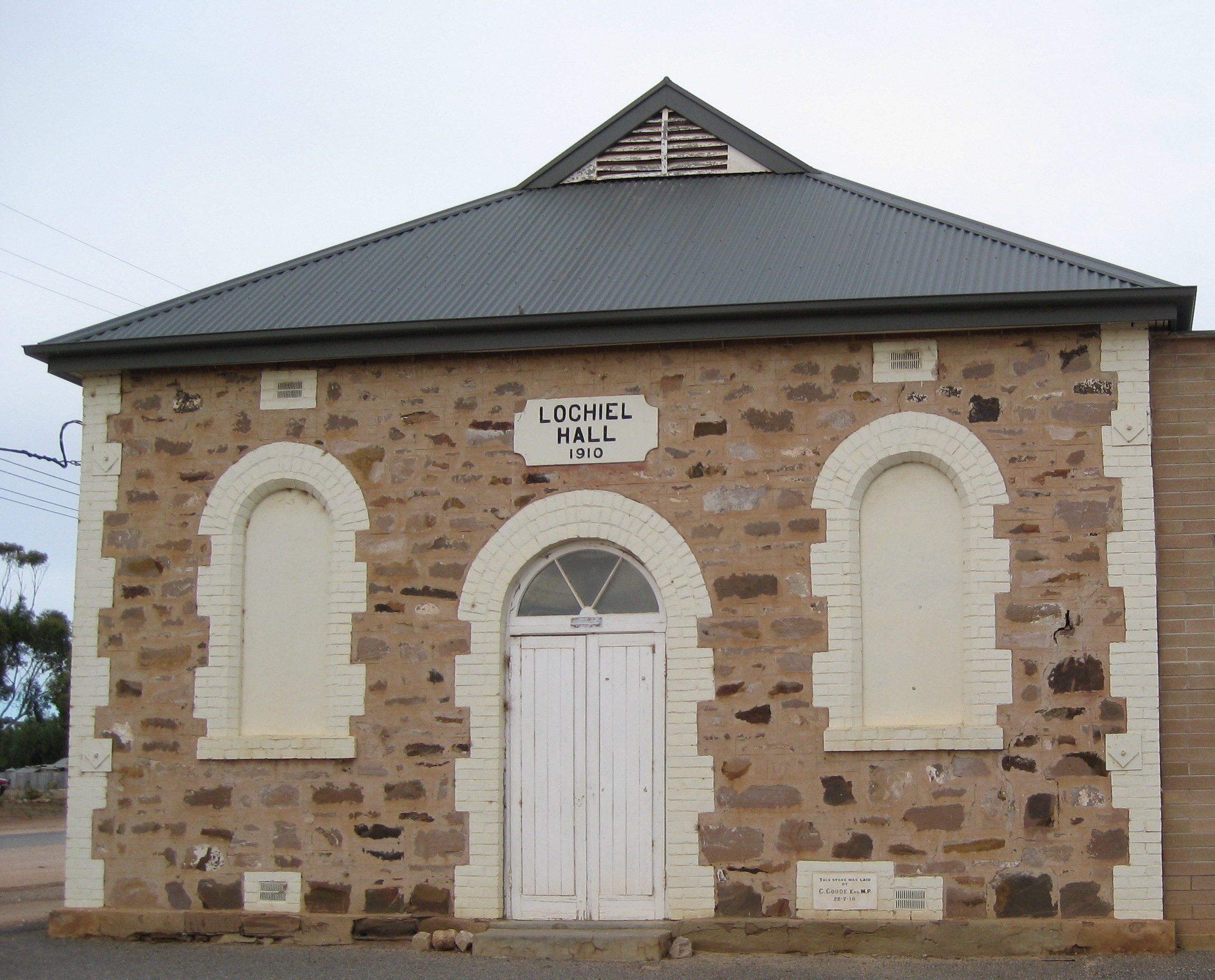
Lochiel's community hall

== Governance ==
The local government agency serving the town is Wakefield Regional Council following a transfer in 1997 from the District Council of Blyth-Snowtown. The town boundaries were formalised in 2000. (Note: An adjustment was made in 2007 to annex an eastern strip of Ninnes that had been within Wakefield Regional Council, the same local council as Lochiel, instead of the council governing the rest of Ninnes (District Council of Barunga West).)

The town lies in the state electoral district of Nurangga and in the federal electoral division of Grey.

== Economy ==
In 1868, the potential of Lake Bumbunga's shallow waters for natural salt mining was recognised. Salt has been harvested from the lake bed in summer months since 1881, providing employment and other economic benefits for many years. After 1913, when the Australian Salt Company was incorporated, the company and its successors, latterly trading as Cheetham Salt, have held the lake leases continuously. Profitability was improved after a 9 km branch line was built (Note: The line left the Bowmans–Snowtown section of the mainline between Adelaide and Redhill (Port Pirie after 1937) at Bumbunga passing siding (33°54′45″S 138°13′45″E). It headed south-west on the northern side of Leslie McIntyre Road (also known as Blyth Road), then at the southern tip of Lake Bumbunga swung north between the lake and Highway 1, terminating 1.5 km north of the town (33°54′51″S 138°09′49″E). The track was lifted about the 1970s.) from the nearby broad-gauge railway line, enabling transport directly to Port Adelaide. Lochiel itself is said to have "developed slowly with the industry, its survival in the 20th century being almost totally dependent on the salt harvesting".

In 2011, about 270 million tonnes of lignite (brown coal) were estimated to be in a deposit north of Lochiel in seven seams from 70 to 110 metres underground. The seams' thickness varied from 0.3 to 3.0 metres, for a total of 9.4 metres. The site was considered to be favourable because it lies only 6 km (4 mi) from the railway line to Adelaide, Darwin and Perth. The deposit was not subsequently developed.

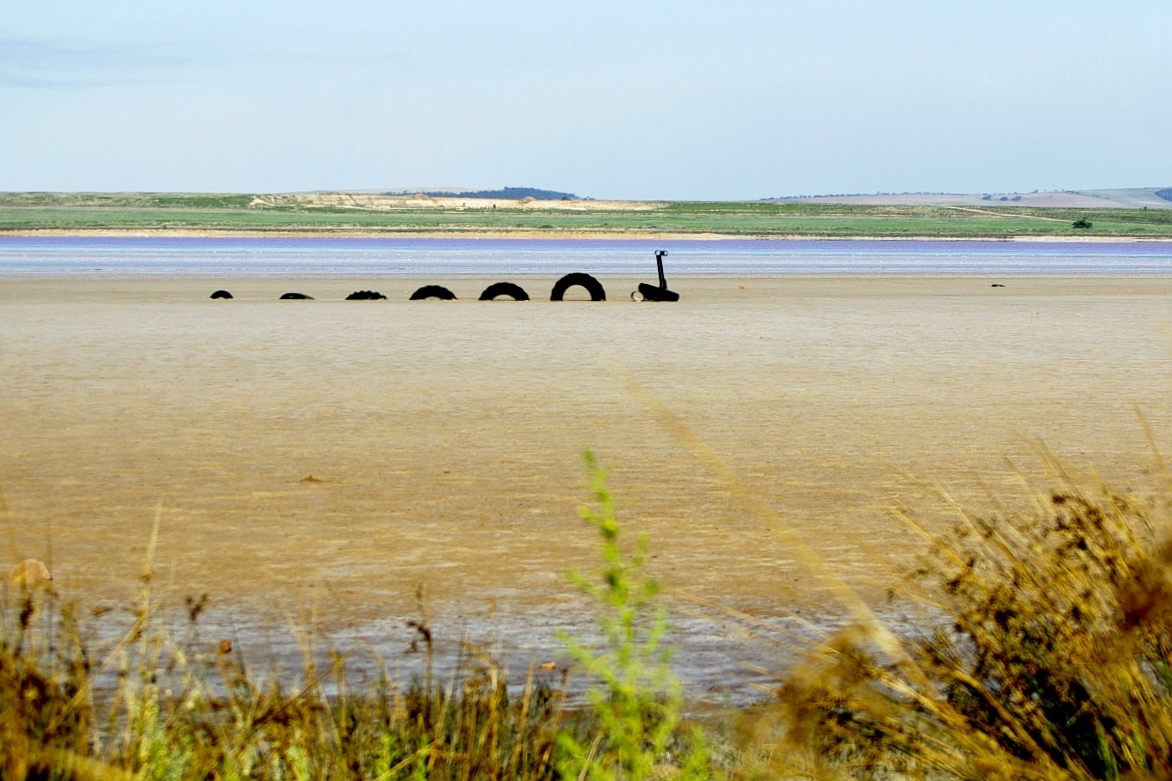
The "Loch Eel" sculpture in the shallows of Lake Bumbunga

== Attraction ==
In 1972 a local man, Gary Taylor, and his friends created a sculpture of rubber tyres and plastic in the shallows of Lake Bumbunga 2.4 km north of the town (33°54′09″S 138°10′05″E), to be visible from the main highway. They named it "Loch Eel" – a tongue-in-cheek allusion to the supposed appearance of the Loch Ness Monster. There is speculation that by early-mid 2022 Lochiel will have another tourist drawcard added to the list of things to appreciate, and to help break up long drives on highway one.
