= Port Wakefield, South Australia =

Port Wakefield
- Town
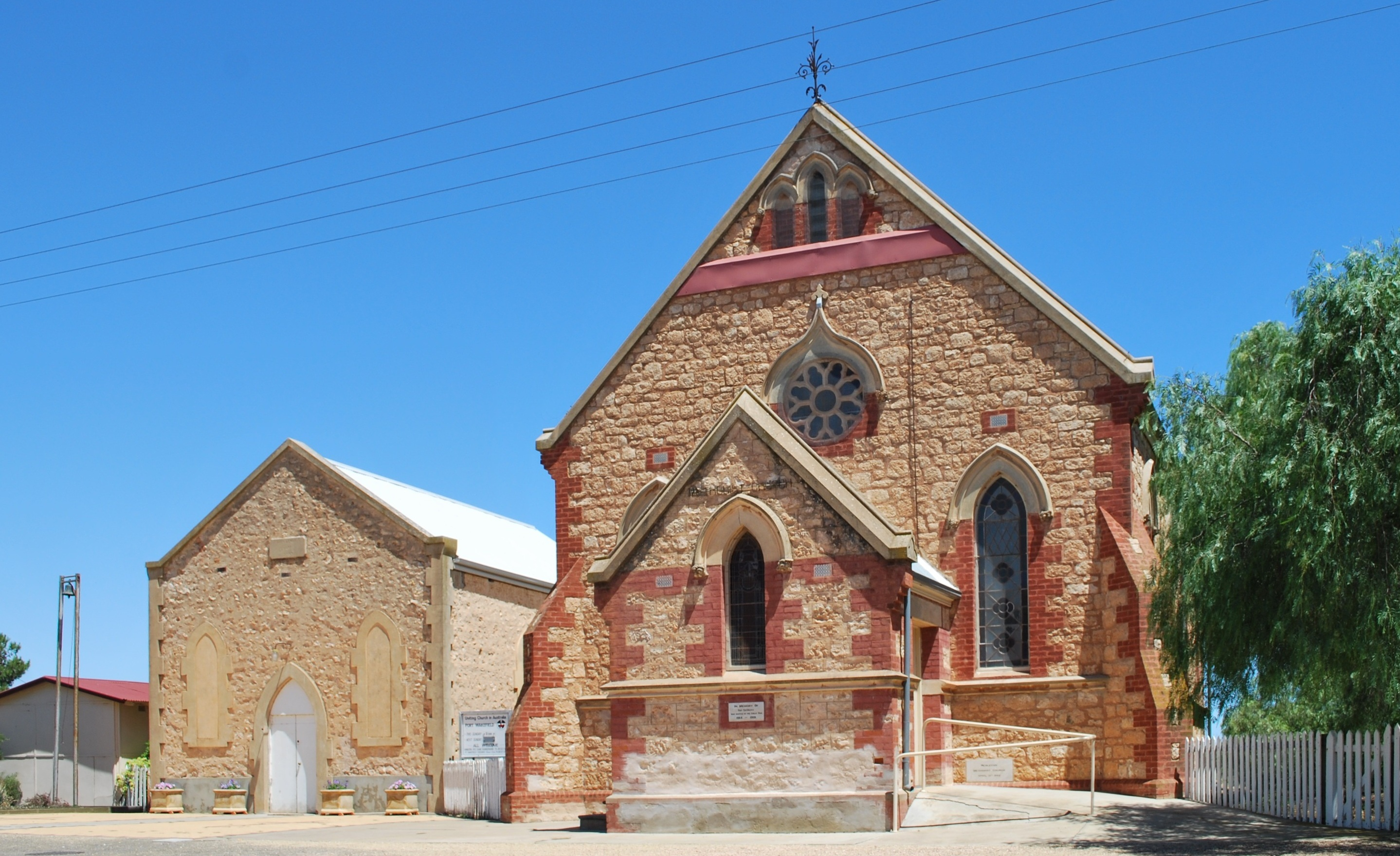
- The Uniting Church at Port Wakefield

- Coordinates: 34°11′17″S 138°08′54″E
- Country: Australia
- State: South Australia
- LGA: Wakefield Regional Council
- Location: 99 km (62 mi) North West of Adelaide city centre via

Government
  - State electorate: Narungga
  - Federal division: Grey

Population
  - Total: 593 (UCL 2021)
- Time zone: UTC+9:30 (ACST)
  - Summer (DST): UTC+10:30 (ACST)
- Postcode: 5550
Localities around Port Wakefield
Port Arthur	Port Arthur; Beaufort	Beaufort
Gulf St Vincent	Port Wakefield	Bowmans; Kallora
Gulf St Vincent	Proof Range; Inkerman	Inkerman

Port Wakefield (formerly Port Henry) is a town at the mouth of the River Wakefield, at the head of the Gulf St Vincent in South Australia. It was the first government town to be established north of the state capital, Adelaide. Port Wakefield is situated 98.7 kilometres (61.3 miles) from the Adelaide city centre on the Port Wakefield Highway section of the A1 National Highway.

Port Wakefield is a major stop on the Adelaide – Yorke Peninsula and Adelaide – Port Augusta road routes. Travellers between Adelaide and any of the Flinders Ranges, Yorke Peninsula, Eyre Peninsula or the Nullarbor Plain will likely travel through Port Wakefield. Due to its strategic location, Port Wakefield is known for its roadhouses and trucking stops.

Just north of the township there is a major forked intersection where the Yorke Peninsula traffic diverges west onto the Copper Coast Highway from the main Augusta Highway. The intersection is notorious for road accidents and traffic delays, especially at the end of holidays and long weekends.

== History ==
The town was originally named Port Henry by William Hill. The name of the town was changed to Port Wakefield around 1849, after the Wakefield River.

In 1848, the Patent Copper Company agreed to build and operate a smelter at Burra. Seeking to reduce cartage costs, a track was surveyed to its port, established at the mouth of the River Wakefield. By securing leases of the appropriate Crown Land, the company obtained a monopoly of the port. The Government declared the track the Great Western Road. A wharf was constructed along the bank of the river and cargo was transferred between the wharf and ships at anchor in the Gulf on lighters.

With the opening of the railway from Adelaide to Gawler in 1857, the Copper Company's traffic came to a sudden end, leaving only pastoral produce to flow to the port. Mixed farming was established on lands opening up by the Government along the River in the mid-1860s, and this called for improvement in transport to the Port.

William Hanson, Manager for Railways, selected a route for a horse-drawn tramway terminating at Hoyles Plains, later renamed Hoyleton. The enabling Act provided for a tramway of 28 miles 41 chains (45.9 km) in length to a gauge of 1,067 mm (3 ft 6 in), the first line in South Australia built to that gauge. The Government agreed that the line should be operated by a private body. The successful tenderer was Paul Badcock who opened the line to traffic in January 1870. Horses were worked in three relays between the stations on the route.

The choice of gauge was influenced by the argument that costs varied with the cube of the gauge. As this railway had its own port, it was not expected to link up with any broad gauge railways which avoided any break of gauge problems. Following a surrender of the lease, the line was taken over by the Government at the end of 1870.

In March 1876 the line was extended from Hoyleton to Blyth. Steam locomotives were obtained and by August 1876, the entire line was being worked by steam power. The line was extended at the other end from Port Wakefield to Kadina in October.

In 1927, these railways, and the remainder of the Western system that grew from them, were converted to the broad 1,600 mm (5 ft 3 in) gauge.

A Wesleyan Methodist chapel was built in 1868 by a local stonemason and carpenter. It continues in use as a Uniting Church.

The 1955 Australian Grand Prix was held at the Port Wakefield Circuit east of the township. The circuit opened in 1953 after public road racing was banned in South Australia. It closed in 1961, when some of its facilities were moved to the longer Mallala Race Circuit.

=== 2020 highway upgrade ===
A proposal by the Liberal Party before the 2018 state election was that if it was elected, it would build a single lane overpass at the Augusta Highway end of the Copper Coast Highway to reduce traffic conflicts. The party won the election and upgraded the planning to completely grade-separate the intersection and duplicate the highway through Port Wakefield.

The contract for detailed design and construction of duplication of Port Wakefield Road through Port Wakefield and grade-separate the intersection with the Copper Coast Highway was let in March 2020 to the "Port Wakefield to Port Augusta Alliance", a consortium of CPB Contractors, Aurecon and GHD Group. This consortium is also responsible for the duplication of Joy Baluch AM Bridge in Port Augusta. Both projects are expected to be completed in 2022.

== Local government ==
In November 1878 the District Council of Port Wakefield was established, on the same day as the District Council of Clinton and the District Council of Kulpara, bringing local government to the area.

== Media ==
In 1876, a short lived newspaper was printed in the town, called the Port Wakefield Times and Balaclava, Hoyleton, Blyth and Lochiel Advertiser (July – August 1876), published by Edward Richardson. A later newspaper was the Wakefield Sun (15 July 1910 – 31 May 1912). Another publication, the Port Wakefield Monitor (7 January 1915 – 26 June 1941), was published locally.
