= Hundred of Dalrymple =

Dalrymple
- Cadastral division
- Coordinates: 34°56′43″S 137°39′29″E
- Country: Australia
- State: South Australia
- Established: 20 June 1872

Area
  - Total: 250 km^{2} (97 sq mi)
- County: Fergusson
Lands administrative divisions around Dalrymple
Minlacowie	Minlacowie; Ramsay	Gulf St Vincent
Moorowie	Dalrymple	Gulf St Vincent
Moorowie	Melville	Gulf St Vincent

The Hundred of Dalrymple is a cadastral unit of hundred in South Australia on the southern Yorke Peninsula. It is one of the 16 hundreds of the County of Fergusson. Proclaimed on 20 June 1872, it is officially thought to be named after Dalrymple, East Ayrshire, Scotland.

The townships of Stansbury and Wool Bay, as well as the north eastern part of the modern bounded locality of Yorketown, are within the hundred boundaries.

Dalrymple substation, midway between Stansbury and Wool Bay at Hayward Corner, is named for the hundred.

== Name ==
Officially it is thought to be named after Dalrymple, East Ayrshire, Scotland, but it may alternatively have been named after the father of James Fergusson, the state governor of the day, Charles Dalrymple Fergusson.

== Local government ==
The District Council of Dalrymple was established in 1877, bringing local government to the entire hundred. In 1932 it was amalgamated along with the District Council of Melville into the District Council of Yorketown. Yorketown council was amalgamated with the councils of Central Yorke Peninsula, Warooka and Minlaton in 1997 to form the present Yorke Peninsula Council, which locally governs most of the peninsula.

== See also ==
- Lands administrative divisions of South Australia
