= Electoral results for the district of Narungga =

South Australian district election results

This is a list of electoral results for the electoral district of Narungga in South Australian state elections from the district's first election in 2018 until the present.

== Members for Narungga ==
Member	Party	Term
Fraser Ellis	Liberal	2018–2026

== Election results ==
=== Elections in the 2020s ===
==== 2026 ====
2026 South Australian state election: Narungga
Party	Candidate	Votes	%	±%
One Nation	Chantelle Thomas	9,037	37.5	+32.0
Liberal	Tania Stock	5,409	22.5	−7.6
Independent	Fraser Ellis	4,101	17.0	−13.5
Labor	Esther Short	3,745	15.6	−4.6
Greens	Jessica Scriven	692	2.9	+2.9
Legalise Cannabis	Nicole Lornie	451	1.9	+1.9
Family First	John Bennett	334	1.4	−1.9
Australian Family	Maria Vottari	132	0.5	+0.6
Real Change	Joanne Taylerson	122	0.5	+0.5
United Voice	Peter Illingworth	56	0.2	+0.2
Total formal votes		24,079	94.3	
Informal votes		1,444	5.7	
Turnout		25,523		
Two-candidate-preferred result
One Nation	Chantelle Thomas	12,073	50.1	+50.1
Liberal	Tania Stock	12,015	49.9	+8.0
One Nation gain from Independent		Swing	+50.1	

Results are not final. Last updated on 2 April at 8:30pm ACDT.

==== 2022 ====
2022 South Australian state election: Narungga
Party	Candidate	Votes	%	±%
Independent	Fraser Ellis	7,139	32.5	+32.5
Liberal	Tom Michael	6,327	28.8	−18.4
Labor	Mark Paull	4,427	20.2	+4.1
Independent	Dianah Walter	1,826	8.3	+8.3
One Nation	Kerry White	1,183	5.4	+5.4
Family First	Wendy Leanne Joyce	770	3.5	+3.5
National	Ashley Wright	283	1.3	+1.3
Total formal votes		21,955	95.7	
Informal votes		995	4.3	
Turnout		22,950	91.4	
Notional two-party-preferred count
Liberal	Tom Michael	14,035	63.9	−4.3
Labor	Mark Paull	7,920	36.1	+4.3
Two-candidate-preferred result
Independent	Fraser Ellis	12,808	58.3	+58.3
Liberal	Tom Michael	9,147	41.7	−26.6
Independent hold				

Distribution of preferences: Narungga
Party	Candidate	Votes	Round 1		Round 2		Round 3		Round 4		Round 5	
Party	Candidate	Votes	Dist.	Total	Dist.	Total	Dist.	Total	Dist.	Total	Dist.	Total
Quota (50% + 1)		10,978										
Independent	Fraser Ellis	7,139	+51	7,190	+268	7,458	+502	7,960	+1,135	9,096	+3,713	12,808
Liberal	Tom Michael	6,327	+120	6,447	+85	6,532	+165	6,697	+524	7,221	+1,926	9,147
Labor	Mark Paull	4,427	+19	4,446	+124	4,570	+200	4,770	+869	5,639	Excluded	
Independent	Dianah Walter	1,826	+46	1,872	+112	1,984	+544	2,528	Excluded			
One Nation	Kerry White	1,183	+30	1,213	+198	1,411	Excluded					
Family First	Wendy Leanne Joyce	770	+17	787	Excluded							
National	Ashley Wright	283	Excluded									

=== Elections in the 2010s ===
==== 2018 ====
2018 South Australian state election: Narungga
Party	Candidate	Votes	%	±%
Liberal	Fraser Ellis	10,269	46.5	−7.0
SA-Best	Sam Davies	5,378	24.3	+24.3
Labor	Douglas Milera	3,734	16.9	−9.6
Conservatives	Rebecca Hewett	2,012	9.1	+1.9
Greens	Jason Swales	700	3.2	+0.3
Total formal votes		22,093	95.9	−0.5
Informal votes		937	4.1	+0.5
Turnout		23,030	93.6	+0.5
Two-party-preferred result
Liberal	Fraser Ellis	14,883	67.4	+3.3
Labor	Douglas Milera	7,210	32.6	−3.3
Two-candidate-preferred result
Liberal	Fraser Ellis	13,136	59.5	−4.6
SA-Best	Sam Davies	8,957	40.5	+40.5
Liberal hold				
