= Sandilands, South Australia =

Sandilands South Australia
- Coordinates: 34°30′51″S 137°46′49″E
- Population: 85 (SAL 2021)
- Established: 1999
- Postcode(s): 5571
- Time zone: ACST (UTC+9:30)
  - Summer (DST): ACST (UTC+10:30)
- Location: 88 km (55 mi) NW of Adelaide; 18 km (11 mi) SE of Maitland
- LGA(s): Yorke Peninsula Council
- Region: Yorke and Mid North
- County: Fergusson
- State electorate(s): Narungga
- Federal division(s): Grey
Mean max temp	Mean min temp	Annual rainfall
22.6 °C; 73 °F	10.7 °C; 51 °F	332.0 mm 13.1 in
Suburbs around Sandilands:
Yorke Valley	Yorke Valley; Cunningham; Ardrossan	James Well; Rogues Point
Urania; Wauraltee	Sandilands	Gulf St Vincent; Pine Point
Wauraltee	Curramulka	Pine Point
- Footnotes: Adjoining localities

Sandilands is a locality in the Australian state of South Australia located on the east coast of Yorke Peninsula immediately adjoining Gulf St Vincent about 88 kilometres (55 mi) north-west of the state capital of Adelaide and about 18 kilometres (11 mi) south-east of the municipal seat in Maitland.

Its boundaries which were created in May 1999 for the “long established name.” The locality's name is derived from Robert Hamilton Sandilands (1841-1923) who lived there during the 1880s.

As of 2014, the majority land use within the locality is “primary production.”

Sandilands is located within the federal division of Grey, the state electoral district of Narungga and the local government area of the Yorke Peninsula Council.
