= District Council of Yorke Peninsula =

The District Council of Yorke Peninsula may refer to one of two local government areas in South Australia:

- District Council of Yorke Peninsula (1888–1969)
- Yorke Peninsula Council, which was known as District Council of Yorke Peninsula from its creation in 1997 until 2013
