= Koolywurtie =

Koolywurtie may refer to:

- The Anglicised version of the local aboriginal name for the headland of Black Point (South Australia)
- Hundred of Koolywurtie, a cadastral unit in Australia.
- Koolywurtie, South Australia, a locality in the Yorke Peninsula Council
