= Chinaman Wells, South Australia =

Chinaman Wells South Australia
- Coordinates: 34.381080°S 137.480490°E
- Population: 4 (SAL 2021)
- Established: 1999
- Postcode(s): 5573
- Time zone: ACST (UTC+9:30)
  - Summer (DST): ACST (UTC+10:30)
- Location: 119 km (74 mi) north-west of Adelaide
- LGA(s): Yorke Peninsula Council
- Region: Yorke and Mid North
- County: Fergusson
- State electorate(s): Narungga
- Federal division(s): Grey
Mean max temp	Mean min temp	Annual rainfall
21.7 °C; 71 °F	11.3 °C; 52 °F	503.7 mm 19.8 in
Suburbs around Chinaman Wells:
Spencer Gulf	Balgowan	Balgowan
Spencer Gulf	Chinaman Wells	Balgowan
Point Pearce	Point Pearce	Point Pearce
- Footnotes: Distances; Coordinates; Climate; Adjoining localities

Chinaman Wells is a locality in the Australian state of South Australia located on the west coast of Yorke Peninsula immediately adjoining Spencer Gulf about 119 kilometres (74 miles) north-west of the state capital of Adelaide.

Its boundaries were created in May 1999 for the “long established name” which was originally used for a shack site now within the locality. The locality also includes the Holywood Shack Area.

As of 2016, the majority land use within the locality is conservation zoned in respect to close proximity to the coastline with Spencer Gulf. A secondary use is a strip of land overlooking the coastline which is zoned for residential use.

Chinaman Wells is located within the federal division of Grey, the state electoral district of Narungga and the local government area of the Yorke Peninsula Council.
