= Balgowan, South Australia =

Balgowan
- Town
- Coordinates: 34°20′S 137°29′E
- Country: Australia
- State: South Australia
- Region: Yorke and Mid North
- LGA: Yorke Peninsula Council
- Location: 121 km (75 mi) NW of Adelaide city centre; 20 km (12 mi) west of Maitland
- Established: 1878

Government
  - State electorate: Narungga
  - Federal division: Grey

Population
  - Total: 92 (SAL 2021)
- Postcode: 5573
- County: Daly; Fergusson
- Mean max temp: 21.7 °C (71.1 °F)
- Mean min temp: 11.3 °C (52.3 °F)
- Annual rainfall: 503.7 mm (19.83 in)
Localities around Balgowan
Spencer Gulf	Nalyappa	Weetulta
Chinaman Wells; Spencer Gulf	Balgowan	Weetulta; Maitland
Point Pearce	Point Pearce	South Kilkerran
- Distances; Coordinates; Climate; Adjoining localities

Balgowan is a small coastal town on the west coast of South Australia's Yorke Peninsula. It is located approximately 20 kilometres (12 miles) west of Maitland. Like other towns popular with tourists on Yorke Peninsula, it has a large number of shacks, holiday houses, caravan facilities and a boat ramp. The population generally increases during peak holiday periods.

The government town of Balgowan was surveyed in September 1878 and was named after a town located in Perthshire, Scotland. Boundaries were created for the locality also known as Balgowan in May 1999 and which include the former government town and the Tiparra Shack Site.

Balgowan's only shop is a general store. The store closed in August 2011 and reopened late 2013.

Balgowan is located within the federal division of Grey, the state electoral district of Narungga and the local government area of the Yorke Peninsula Council.

== See also ==
- List of cities and towns in South Australia
