= Tiparra, South Australia =

Tiparra or Tipara is a name associated with an area south of Moonta on Yorke Peninsula in South Australia. Uses of the word include:

- Hundred of Tiparra
- The Hundred of Tiparra School in Winulta opened in 1884 and was renamed Winulta School in 1891,
- Tiparra Bay off the coast of Nalyappa, also previously known as Baie Duguesclin
- Tiparra Reef in the middle of the bay
- Tiparra Springs in Nalyappa
