= Cunningham, South Australia =

Cunningham South Australia
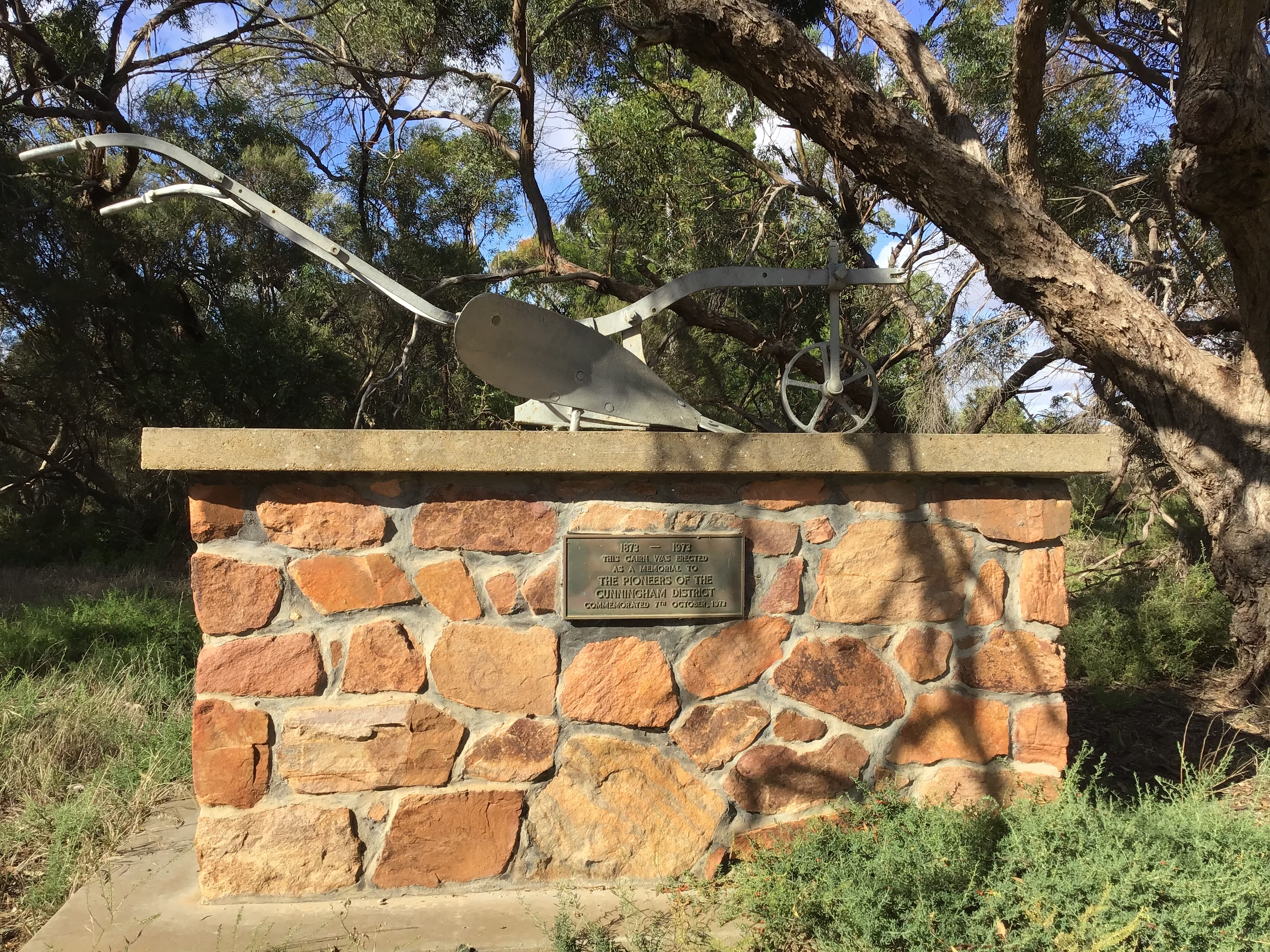
- Memorial to early settlers in the area

- Coordinates: 34.42°S 137.799°E
- Population: 78 (SAL 2021)
- Postcode(s): 5571
- Location: 12 km (7 mi) west of Ardrossan; 13 km (8 mi) east of Maitland
- LGA(s): Yorke Peninsula Council
- State electorate(s): Narungga
- Federal division(s): Grey
Localities around Cunningham:
Maitland	Petersville	Dowlingville
Yorke Valley	Cunningham	Ardrossan
	Sandilands

Cunningham is a locality on Yorke Peninsula in South Australia. It lies on the road between Ardrossan and Maitland.

The area is in the traditional lands of the Narungga people. Cunningham was settled in the 19th century. The present boundaries were formalised in May 1999. They straddle the boundary of the Hundred of Cunningham and Hundred of Maitland. The principal industry is farming, in particular growing cereal grain and sheep.

A Wesleyan Chapel was erected in 1879. In 1881, there was a school operated at Cunningham in a room belonging to Mr Pudney.
