= Arthurton, South Australia =

Arthurton South Australia
- Coordinates: 34°15′38″S 137°45′15″E
- Population: 157 (SAL 2021)
- Established: 25 January 1877 (town); 27 May 1999 (locality)
- Time zone: ACST (UTC+9:30)
  - Summer (DST): ACDT (UTC+10:30)
- LGA(s): Yorke Peninsula Council
- Region: Yorke and Mid North
- County: Daly
- State electorate(s): Narungga
- Federal division(s): Grey
Localities around Arthurton:
Agery	Agery; Sunnyvale	Kainton
Weetulta	Arthurton	Clinton Centre
Maitland	Maitland	Winulta
- Footnotes: Adjoining localities

Arthurton is a town and locality in the Australian state of South Australia.

Arthurton was established on 25 January 1877. It was named after Arthur, the son of South Australian Governor Anthony Musgrave, who insisted on this name after it had already been named "Kalkabury".

== See also ==
- List of cities and towns in South Australia
