= Sunnyvale, South Australia =

Sunnyvale South Australia
- Coordinates: 34.14°S 137.82°E
- Population: 38 (SAL 2021)
- Postcode(s): 5552
- Time zone: ACST (UTC+9:30)
  - Summer (DST): ACDT (UTC+10:30)
- Location: 108 km (67 mi) NW of Adelaide city centre
- LGA(s): Yorke Peninsula Council
- Region: Yorke and Mid North
- County: Daly
- State electorate(s): Narungga
- Federal division(s): Grey
Localities around Sunnyvale:
Cunliffe	Cunliffe; Paskeville	Paskeville
Agery	Sunnyvale	Kainton
Arthurton	Arthurton	Clinton Centre
- Footnotes: Adjoining localities

Sunnyvale or Sunny Vale is a locality and former town in the Australian state of South Australia situated about 10 km south west of Kainton in the upper Yorke Peninsula, consisting mostly of a schoolhouse and Methodist church. Farms nearby were owned by the Lamshed families.

== See also ==
- List of cities and towns in South Australia
