= Cunliffe, South Australia =

Cunliffe South Australia
- Coordinates: 34.07923530°S 137.74863203°E
- Population: 50 (SAL 2021)
- Established: 1878
- Postcode(s): 5554
- LGA(s): Copper Coast Council
- State electorate(s): Narungga
- Federal division(s): Grey
Localities around Cunliffe:
Boors Plain	Boors Plain	Thrington
Boors Plain	Cunliffe	Paskeville
Agery	Sunnyvale; Agery	Sunnyvale
- Footnotes: Coordinates

Cunliffe is a rural locality in the Australian state of South Australia at the northern end of the Yorke Peninsula.
