= District Council of Central Yorke Peninsula =

Coordinates: 34°22′00″S 137°40′00″E

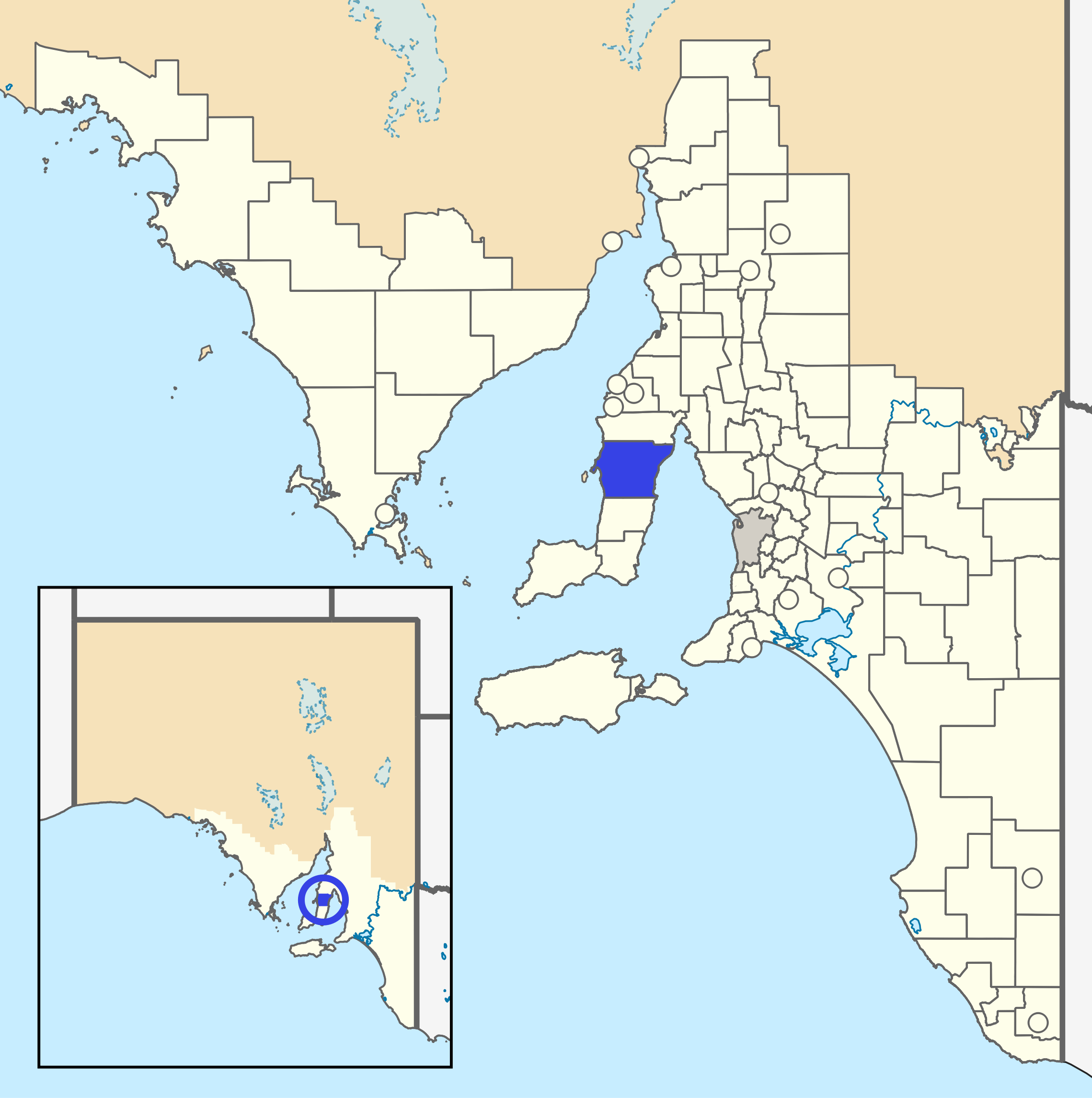
The District Council of Central Yorke Peninsula (blue) as it was in 1970, prior to merging with the District Council of Clinton

The District Council of Central Yorke Peninsula was a local government area in South Australia from 1969 to 1997. The council seat was at Maitland.

== History ==
The District Council of Central Yorke Peninsula was formed on 1 April 1969 with the amalgamation of the Corporate Town of Maitland and the original District Council of Yorke Peninsula at the request of the two councils. It had seven wards at its inception: Kilkerran, Maitland Township, Maitland District, Ardrossan Township, Cunningham, Wauraltee and Muloowurtie, each electing two councillors. It initially operated out of the Maitland and District Hall, which was refurbished for this purpose, but in 1983 moved into an office block in Elizabeth Street, Maitland.

In 1986, the district council was described as having an area of 1,558.8 square kilometres (601.9 sq mi) being the full extent of the cadastral Hundreds of Cunningham, Kilkerran, Maitland, Muloowurtie and Wauraltee, with a population of 4290 (1984 estimate). The major towns were reported as being Ardrossan, Maitland, Pine Point and Port Victoria. Primary industry consisted of the cultivation of barley, wheat, peas, beans, oats and small seed crops while secondary industry consisted of the mining of dolomite to the south of Ardrossan and retail shopping in Ardrossan and Maitland.

The council expanded on 9 October 1987 when the District Council of Clinton was merged into the council. The merged council saw sixteen councillors representing the eight wards of Tiparra, Clinton, Maitland, Kalkabury, Cunningham, Ardrossan, Wauraltee and Muloowurtie.

The council ceased to exist in 1997 when it merged with the District Council of Minlaton, the District Council of Warooka and the District Council of Yorketown to form a revived District Council of Yorke Peninsula (later renamed Yorke Peninsula Council).

== Chairmen ==
The following persons were elected to serve as chairman of the council for the following terms:

- Douglas Philip Clasohm (1969–1970)
- Trevor George Tucker (1970–1985)
- Robert Lloyd Schulze (1985–1989)
