= County of Fergusson =

Fergusson
- Cadastral division
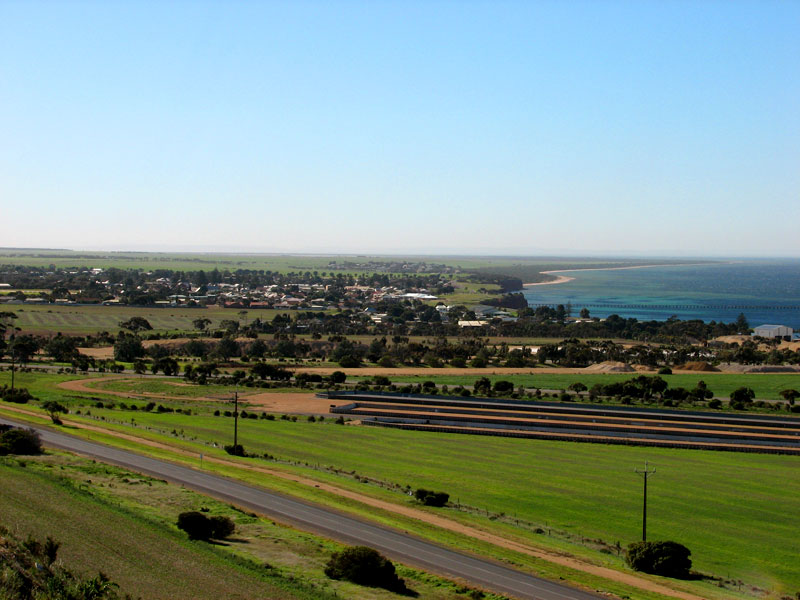
- Ardrossan in the Hundred of Cunningham

- Coordinates: 34.706°S 137.656°E
- Country: Australia
- State: South Australia
- Region: Yorke and Mid North
- LGA: Yorke Peninsula Council
- Established: 1869

Area
  - Total: 4,830 km^{2} (1,864 sq mi)
Lands administrative divisions around Fergusson
Spencer Gulf	Daly	Stanley
Spencer Gulf	Fergusson	Gawler
Spencer Gulf	Investigator Strait	Investigator Strait
- Coordinates; Adjoining counties

County of Fergusson is a cadastral unit located in the Australian state of South Australia which spans Yorke Peninsula south of Price. It was proclaimed in 1869 by Governor Fergusson after whom the county was named.

== Description ==
The County of Fergusson covers the part of Yorke Peninsula "lying to the south of the south boundary of the County of Daly, including Wauraltee Island", the county boundary approximately aligning with Price town centre.

== History ==
The County of Fergusson was proclaimed by Sir James Fergusson, the eighth Governor of South Australia on 18 February 1869 along with three of its constituent hundreds, Melville, Moorowie and Para Wurlie. The county was named after Governor Fergusson, who held office from 1869 to 1873.

Sixteen hundreds were proclaimed within the county from 1869 to 1878: Carribie and Coonarie in 1878, Cunningham in 1873, Curramulka in 1874, Dalrymple and Kilkerran in 1872, Koolywurtie in 1874, Maitland in 1872, Melville in 1869, Minlacowie in 1874, Moorowie in 1869, Muloowurtie in 1874, Para Wurlie in 1869, Ramsay in 1872, Warrenben in 1878 and Wauraltee in 1874.

The earliest local government bodies established within the county were the District Council of Melville, formed in 1875 and comprising the Hundred of Melville and part of the Hundred of Moorowie, the Corporate Town of Yorketown which seceded from Melville in 1879, the Corporate Town of Edithburgh which seceded from the same in 1882, the Corporate Town of Maitland, formed in 1883 within the Hundred of Maitland, and the District Council of Dalrymple, formed in 1877 and comprising the Hundred of Dalrymple.

Until 1888 the remaining residents of Yorke Peninsula, scattered across 14 hundred divisions, strongly resisted the establishment of local government. This allowed them to escape being subject to the expense of council rates until 1888 when the promulgation of the District Councils Act 1887 forced the incorporation of the entire peninsula into district councils. Thus, from January 1888:

- The hundreds of Cunningham, Kilkerran, Wauraltee and Muloowurtie were incorporated as the new District Council of Yorke Peninsula, along with a previously unincorporated portion of the Hundred of Maitland;
- The hundreds of Curramulka, Koolywurtie and Minlacowie were incorporated as the new District Council of Minlaton, along with a previously unincorporated portion of the Hundred of Ramsay; and
- The hundreds of Carribie, Coonarie, Para Wurlie and Warrenben were incorporated into the District Council of Melville along with a previously unincorporated portion of the Hundred of Moorowie.

== List of constituent hundreds ==
=== Description of layout of the hundreds ===
The hundreds located within the County of Fergusson are laid out as follows:

- West coast of the peninsula overlooking Spencer Gulf (from south to north) – Warrenben, Carribie, Para Wurlie, northern end of Moorowie, Minlacowie, Koolywurtie, Wauraltee and Kilkerran.
- South coast of the peninsula overlooking Investigator Strait (from west to east) – Warrenben, Coonarie, Moorowie and Melville.
- East coast overlooking Gulf St Vincent (from south to north) – Melville, Dalrymple, Ramsay, Curramulka, Muloowurtie and Cunningham.
- Boundary with the County of Daly (from west to east) – Kilkerran, Maitland and Cunningham.

=== Hundred of Kilkerran ===
The Hundred of Kilkerran (34°22′45″S 137°33′14″E) was proclaimed on 20 June 1872. It covers an area of 320 square kilometres (123 sq mi) and its name is derived from "Governor Fergusson's estate in Scotland". The first local government body within the hundred was the District Council of Yorke Peninsula.

Localities include Balgowan, Point Pearce, South Kilkerran and part of the Maitland boundary.

=== Hundred of Maitland ===
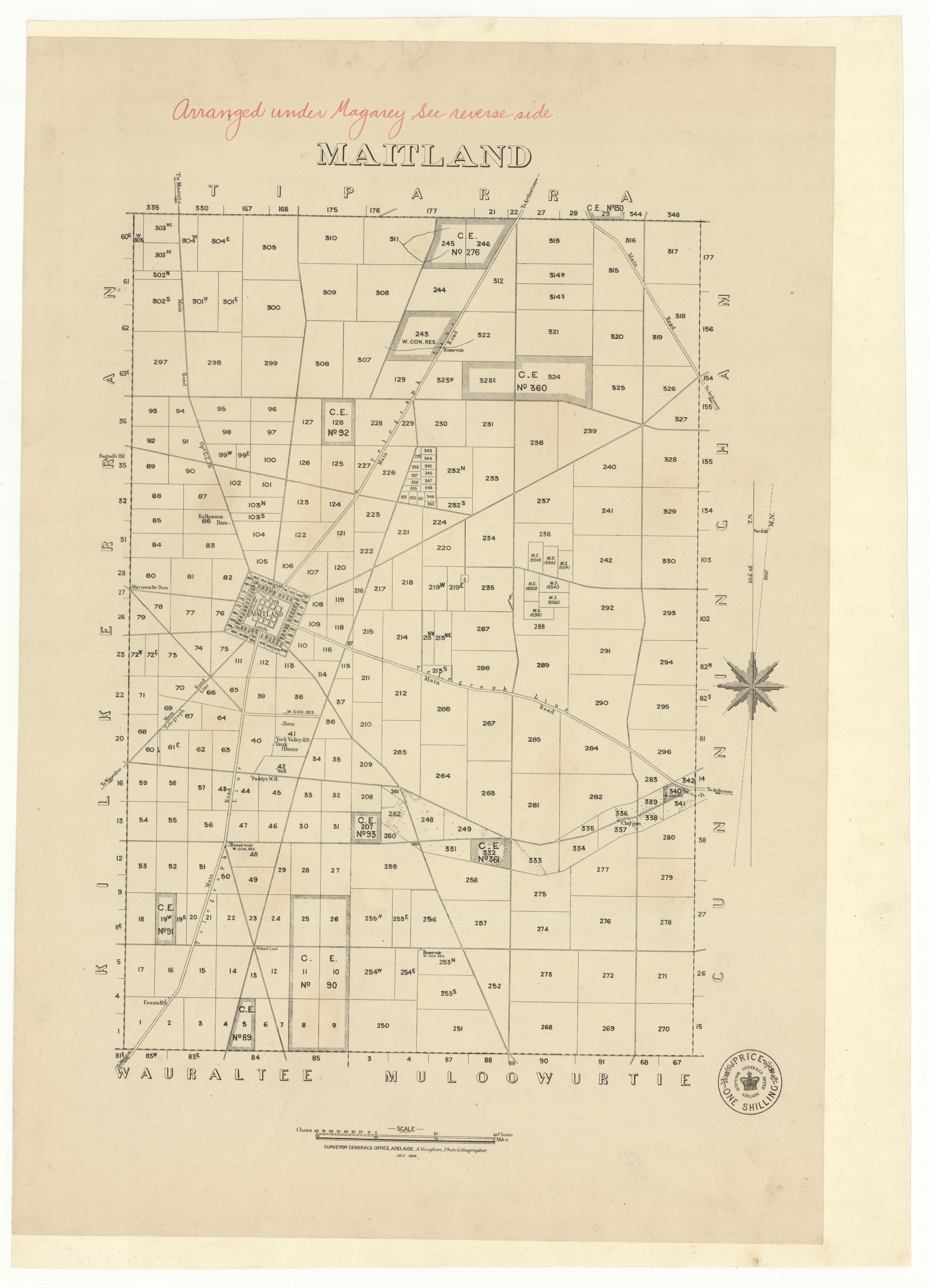
Hundred of Maitland, 1894

The Hundred of Maitland (34°22′26″S 137°43′02″E) was proclaimed on 20 June 1872. It covers an area of 320 square kilometres (123 sq mi) and was named after Julia Maitland who is considered to be a relative of Governor Fergusson., The first local government bodies within the hundred were the District Council of Yorke Peninsula and the Corporate Town of Maitland.

Localities include most of the Maitland boundary including the township, Yorke Valley and the western area of Cunningham.

=== Hundred of Cunningham ===
The Hundred of Cunningham (34°21′35″S 137°53′25″E) was proclaimed on 19 June 1873. It covers an area of 350 square kilometres (134 sq mi) around the Ardrossan and Price areas and its name is reported as being derived from Hastings Cunningham which was the founder of what is now Mount Gambier and "a friend of Governor Fergusson". The first local government body within the hundred was the District Council of Yorke Peninsula.

The localities included are Ardrossan, Cunningham (eastern part), Dowlingville, Petersville, Price, Winulta (southern part).

=== Hundred of Wauraltee ===
The Hundred of Wauraltee (34°32′51″S 137°35′57″E) was proclaimed on 31 December 1878. It covers an area of 300 square kilometres (117 sq mi) and its name is reported as being derived from the aboriginal words "waural" which means 'bandicoot' and "tee" which means 'island island [sic]'.!! The first local government body within the hundred was the District Council of Yorke Peninsula.

Localities include Port Victoria, Urania and Wauraltee.

=== Hundred of Muloowurtie ===
The Hundred of Muloowurtie (34°33′13″S 137°47′33″E) was proclaimed on 31 December 1874. It covers an area of 280 square kilometres (107 sq mi) and its name is reported as being derived from an aboriginal word meaning "a rat burrow". The first local government body within the hundred was the District Council of Yorke Peninsula.

The localities of Sandilands, James Well, Rogues Point, Pine Point and Black Point, and a northern section of Curramulka are within the hundred.

=== Hundred of Koolywurtie ===
Proclaimed in 1874 on central Yorke Peninsula and first governed at the local level by the District Council of Minlaton.

=== Hundred of Curramulka ===
The Hundred of Curramulka (34°41′23″S 137°46′15″E) was proclaimed on 31 December 1874. It covers an area of 270 square kilometres (105 sq mi) and its name is reported as being derived from the aboriginal words "curra" which means emu and "mulka" which means 'deep waterhole'. The first local government body within the hundred was the District Council of Minlaton.

The localities of Curramulka, PortJulia, Sheoak Flat and part of the Port Vincent are within the hundred.

=== Hundred of Minlacowie ===
The Hundred of Minlacowie (34°49′19″S 137°33′26″E) was proclaimed on 26 March 1874. It covers an area of 280 square kilometres (110 sq mi) and its name is reported as being derived from an aboriginal word meaning "sweet water". The first local government body within the hundred was the District Council of Minlaton.

Localities include Minlaton, Brentwood, Parsons Beach and part of the Hardwicke Bay boundary.

=== Hundred of Ramsay ===
The Hundred of Ramsay (34°49′19″S 137°44′36″E) was proclaimed on 20 June 1872. It covers an area of 280 square kilometres (110 sq mi) and was named after J G Ramsay, a South Australian parliamentarian. The first local government bodies within the hundred were the District Council of Minlaton and the District Council of Dalrymple.

Localities include Ramsay, Port Vincent and part of Stansbury

=== Hundred of Carribie ===
The Hundred of Carribie (35°00′01″S 137°03′58″E) was proclaimed on 24 January 1878. It covers an area of 350 square kilometres (137 sq mi) and its name is reported as being derived from an Aboriginal word meaning "Emu Flat". The first local government body within the hundred was the District Council of Melville.

=== Hundred of Para Wurlie ===
The Hundred of Para Wurlie (34°59′12″S 137°16′36″E) was proclaimed on 18 February 1869. It covers an area of 330 square kilometres (126 sq mi) and its name is reported as being derived from the aboriginal words "Para" which means 'water' and "Wurlie" which means 'hut'. The first local government body within the hundred was the District Council of Melville.

=== Hundred of Moorowie ===
The Hundred of Moorowie (35°00′01″S 137°28′15″E) was proclaimed on 18 February 1869. It covers an area of 280 square kilometres (110 sq mi) and its name is reported as being derived from an aboriginal word meaning "a sandy or dusty water". The first local government body within the hundred was the District Council of Melville.

=== Hundred of Dalrymple ===
Proclaimed in 1872 on the southern Yorke Peninsula and first governed at the local level by the District Council of Dalrymple.

=== Hundred of Melville ===
Proclaimed in 1869 at the south-eastern corner of Yorke Peninsula and first governed at the local level by the District Council of Melville, the Corporate Town of Yorketown and the Corporate Town of Edithburgh.

=== Hundred of Coonarie ===
The Hundred of Coonarie (35°06′38″S 137°16′50″E) was proclaimed on 24 January 1878. It covers an area of 270 square kilometres (104 sq mi) and its name is reported as being derived from an aboriginal word meaning "Hollow Tree". The first local government body within the hundred was the District Council of Melville.

=== Hundred of Warrenben ===
The Hundred of Warrenben (35°09′35″S 137°01′47″E) was proclaimed on 24 January 1878. It covers an area of 429 square kilometres (165.5 sq mi) and its name is reported as being derived from an aboriginal word meaning "a waterhole". The first local government body within the hundred was the District Council of Melville.

== See also ==
- Lands administrative divisions of South Australia
