= Weetulta, South Australia =

Weetulta South Australia
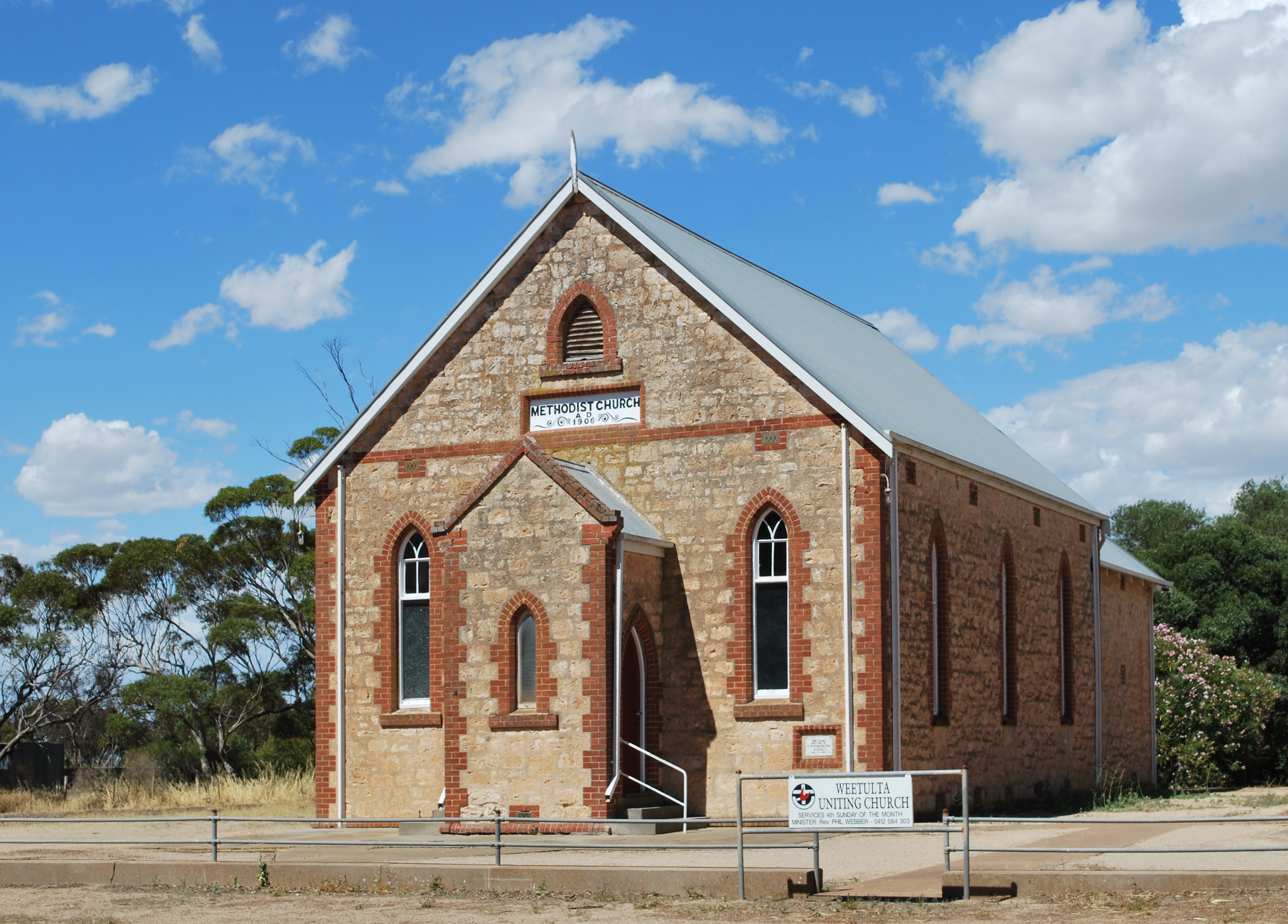
- Uniting church at Weetulta, built in 1906

- Coordinates: 34°14′28″S 137°38′38″E
- Population: 69 (SAL 2021)
- Postcode(s): 5573
- Location: 162 km (101 mi) W of Adelaide; 34 km (21 mi) S of Kadina; 15 km (9 mi) N of Maitland
- LGA(s): Yorke Peninsula Council
- Region: Yorke and Mid North
- County: Daly
- State electorate(s): Narungga
- Federal division(s): Grey
Localities around Weetulta:
Nalyappa	Nalyappa; Agery	Agery
Nalyappa; Balgowan	Weetulta	Arthurton
Balgowan	Maitland	Maitland
- Footnotes: Adjoining localities

Weetulta is a locality in the Australian state of South Australia located on the Yorke Peninsula. The locality is in the Yorke Peninsula Council local government area, 162 kilometres (101 mi) west of the state capital, Adelaide.

== See also ==
- List of cities and towns in South Australia
