= Maitland, Australia =

Maitland, Australia may refer to:

- Maitland, New South Wales
- Maitland, South Australia
