= Agery, South Australia =

Agery South Australia
- Coordinates: 34°09′0″S 137°44′24″E
- Population: 90 (SAL 2021)
- Established: 24 May 1999 (locality)
- Postcode(s): 5558
- Elevation: 104 m (341 ft)
- LGA(s): Yorke Peninsula Council
- Region: Yorke and Mid North
- County: Daly
- State electorate(s): Narungga
- Federal division(s): Grey
Localities around Agery:
Kooroona	Moonta Mines; East Moonta; Boors Plain; Cunliffe	Cunliffe
Nalyappa	Agery	Sunnyvale
Weetulta	Weetulta; Arthurton	Arthurton
- Footnotes: Adjoining localities

Agery is a locality in the Australian state of South Australia located on Yorke Peninsula. It is situated 17 km south-east of Moonta. Its name comes from the Aboriginal word ngadjali meaning "pipe clay".

== History ==
Agery School opened in 1880 and operated for over 100 years. It closed in 1982. Agery Post Office opened in December 1890. Agery Methodist Church, originally known as the New Wesleyan Chapel, was built in 1885 and remained open until 1970.

== Features ==
Agery Reserve is a small nature reserve that is managed by the Moonta Branch of the National Trust of South Australia. It comprises 3.3 ha of mallee scrub.

== Governance ==
Agery is located within the federal division of Grey, the state electoral district of Narungga and the local government area of the Yorke Peninsula Council.

== See also ==
- List of cities and towns in South Australia
