= South Kilkerran, South Australia =

South Kilkerran
- Town
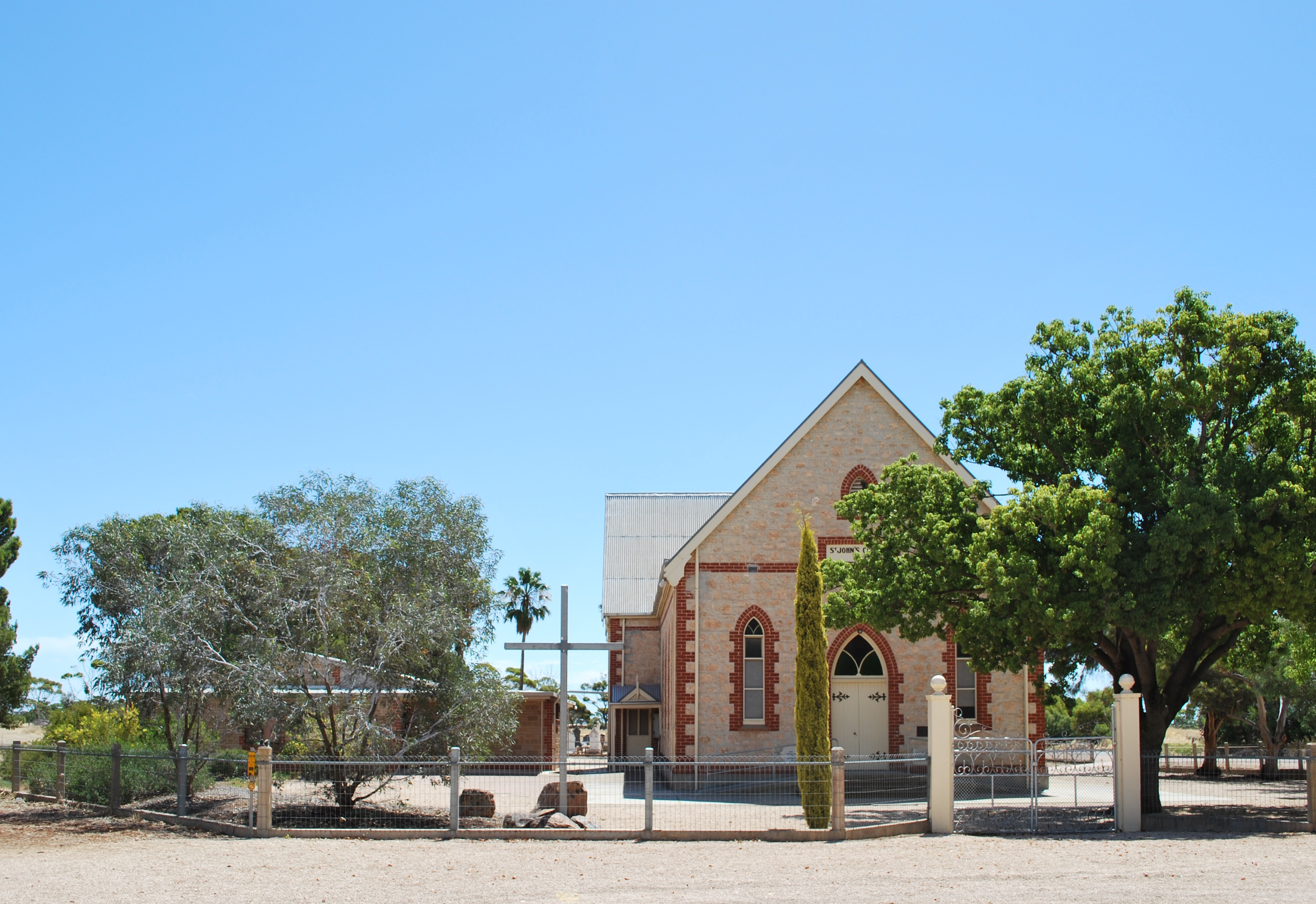
- St John's Lutheran church at South Kilkerran

- Coordinates: 34°26′33″S 137°35′18″E
- Country: Australia
- State: South Australia
- Region: Yorke and Mid North
- LGA: Yorke Peninsula Council
- Location: 9 km (5.6 mi) SW of Maitland
- Established: 27 May 1999

Government
  - State electorate: Narungga
  - Federal division: Grey

Population
  - Total: 59 (SAL 2021)
- Time zone: UTC+9:30 (ACST)
  - Summer (DST): UTC+10:30 (ACST)
- Postcode: 5573
- County: Fergusson
- Mean max temp: 21.9 °C (71.4 °F)
- Mean min temp: 11.3 °C (52.3 °F)
- Annual rainfall: 504.0 mm (19.84 in)
Localities around South Kilkerran
Balgowan	Maitland	Maitland
Point Pearce; Port Victoria	South Kilkerran	Yorke Valley
Port Victoria	Urania	Urania

South Kilkerran is a locality in the Australian state of South Australia located on Yorke Peninsula between Maitland and Port Victoria.

South Kilkerran is still the home of St John's Lutheran church. It formerly also had a St Paul's Lutheran church, and both churches had schools associated with them, which are now closed.

South Kilkerran is located within the federal division of Grey, the state electoral district of Narungga and the local government area of the Yorke Peninsula Council.
