= Hundred of Koolywurtie =

Koolywurtie
- Cadastral division
- Coordinates: 34°41′25″S 137°35′03″E
- Country: Australia
- State: South Australia
- Region: Yorke and Mid North
- LGA: Yorke Peninsula Council
- Established: 31 December 1874

Area
  - Total: 203 km^{2} (78.5 sq mi)
- County: Fergusson
Lands administrative divisions around Koolywurtie
Spencer Gulf	Wauraltee	Wauraltee
Spencer Gulf	Koolywurtie	Curramulka
Spencer Gulf	Minlacowie	Ramsay

The Hundred of Koolywurtie is a hundred in the County of Fergusson in South Australia.

It was proclaimed on 31 December 1874. it covers an area of 227 square kilometres (87.5 mi^{2}). Its name is thought to be derived from the place known as "Koolywurtie or Black Point." The first local government body within the hundred was the District Council of Minlaton.

The localities of Koolywurtie, Port Rickaby and Bluff Beach, and the northern end of the locality of Maitland are within the hundred.
