= James Well, South Australia =

James Well South Australia
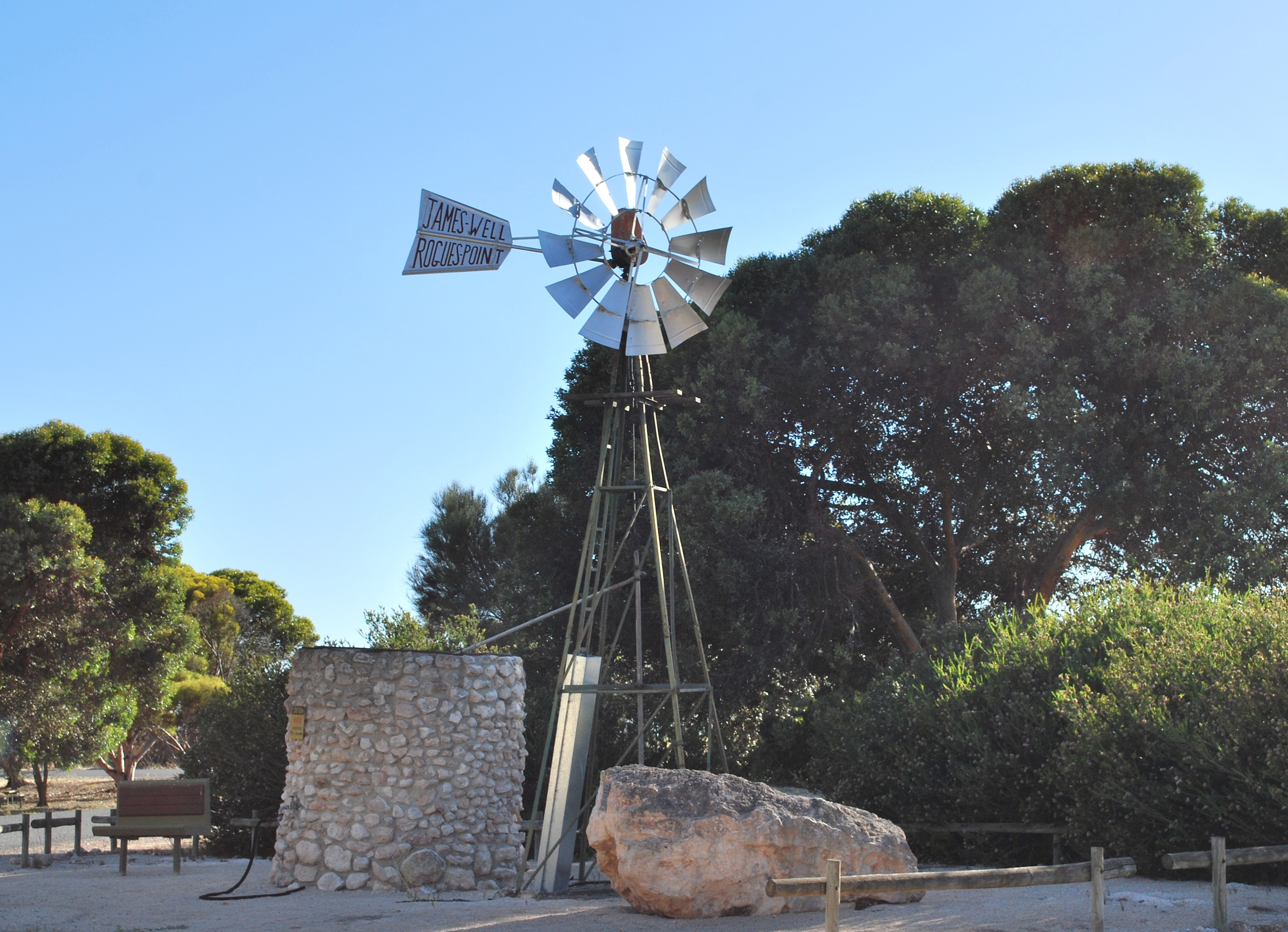
- Windmill at James Well

- Coordinates: 34.480650°S 137.897480°E
- Population: 63 (SAL 2021)
- Established: 1999
- Postcode(s): 5571
- Time zone: ACST (UTC+9:30)
  - Summer (DST): ACST (UTC+10:30)
- Location: 81 km (50 mi) north-west of Adelaide; 5 km (3 mi) south of Ardrossan
- LGA(s): Yorke Peninsula Council
- Region: Yorke and Mid North
- County: Fergusson
- State electorate(s): Narungga
- Federal division(s): Grey
Mean max temp	Mean min temp	Annual rainfall
22.6 °C; 73 °F	10.7 °C; 51 °F	332.0 mm 13.1 in
Localities around James Well:
Ardrossan	Ardrossan	Gulf St Vincent
Sandilands	James Well	Gulf St Vincent
Sandilands	Rogues Point; Sandilands	Gulf St Vincent
- Footnotes: Distances; Coordinates; Climate; Adjoining localities

James Well is a locality in the Australian state of South Australia located on the east coast of Yorke Peninsula immediately adjoining Gulf St Vincent about 84 kilometres (52 miles) north-west of the state capital of Adelaide and about 5 kilometres (3.1 miles) of the centre of Ardrossan.

Its boundaries were created in May 1999 in respect to an existing “shack site.” It was given the “long established name” which was altered from “James Wells” to “James Well.” In May 2014, the locality were expanded to include land adjoining its western boundary in Sandilands.

The locality is bounded in the main by James Well Road to the north, by the Yorke Highway to the west, by Rogue Point Road to the south and by Gulf St Vincent to the east.

As of 2014, the land use within the locality is divided into the following four zones that are parallel to the coastline - a strip of land zoned as “coastal open space” which is reserved both for community use and as a buffer against sea level rise, a strip of land zoned as “settlement” which consists of an area of low density residential and associated buildings, a strip of land zoned as “deferred urban” which is agricultural land reserved for future expansion of the locality’s urban area and a strip of land at the locality’s western boundary which is zoned for “primary production.”

James Well is located within the federal division of Grey, the state electoral district of Narungga and the local government area of the Yorke Peninsula Council.

== See also ==
- List of cities and towns in South Australia
