= Rogues Point, South Australia =

Rogues Point
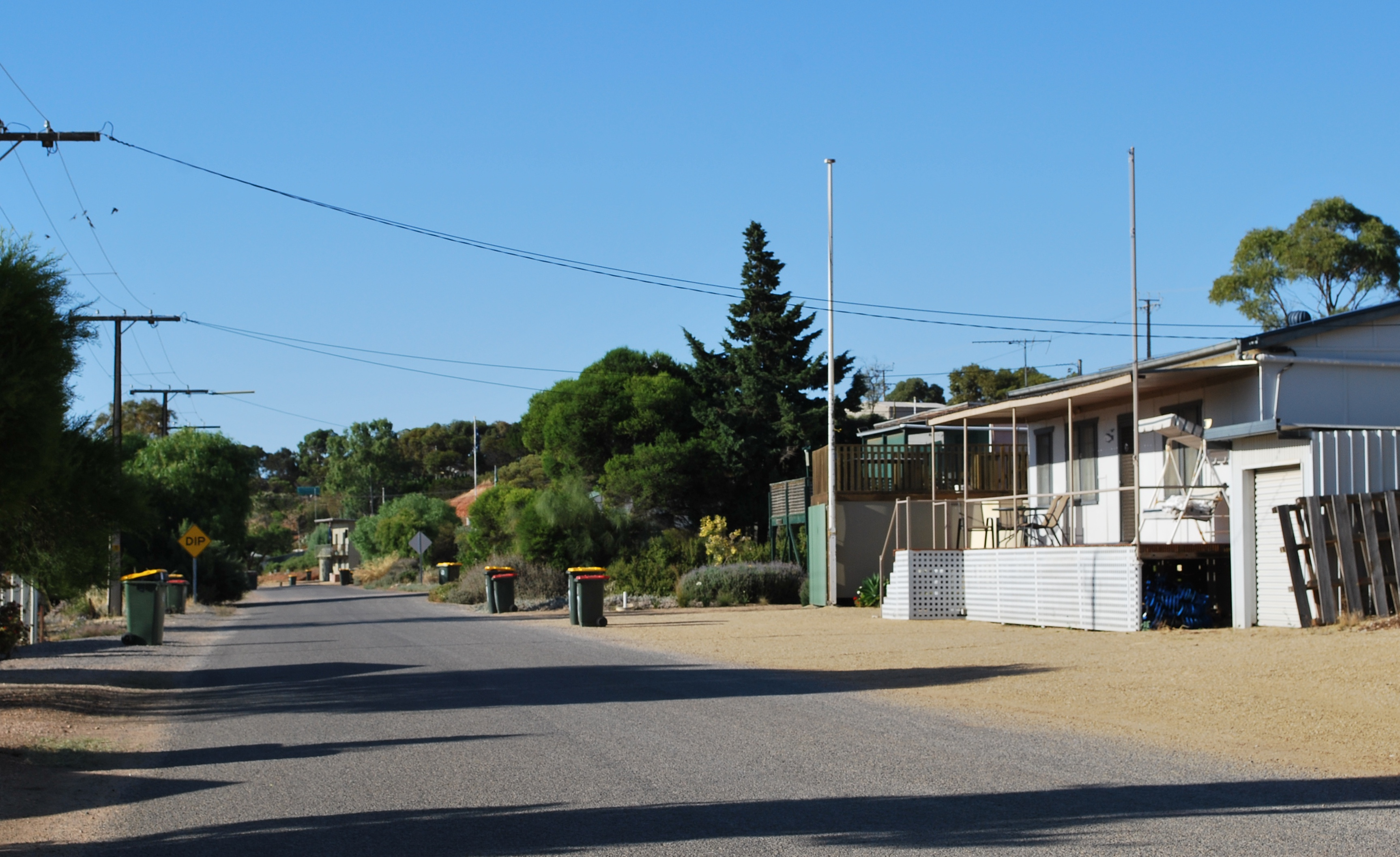
- A street in Rogues Point

- Coordinates: 34.496690°S 137.8947°E
- Country: Australia
- State: South Australia
- LGA: Yorke Peninsula Council
- Location: 80 km (50 mi) north-west of Adelaide city centre; 6.9 km (4.3 mi) south of Ardrossan
- Established: 1999

Government
  - State electorate: Narungga
  - Federal division: Grey

Population
  - Total: 34 (SAL 2021)
- Time zone: UTC+9:30 (ACST)
  - Summer (DST): UTC+10:30 (ACST)
- Postcode: 5571
- Mean max temp: 22.6 °C (72.7 °F)
- Mean min temp: 10.7 °C (51.3 °F)
- Annual rainfall: 332.0 mm (13.07 in)
Localities around Rogues Point
James Well	James Well	Gulf St Vincent
Sandilands	Rogues Point	Gulf St Vincent
Sandilands	Sandilands	Gulf St Vincent
- Distances; Coordinates; Climate; Adjoining localities

Rogues Point is a locality in the Australian state of South Australia located on the east coast of Yorke Peninsula immediately adjoining Gulf St Vincent, about 80 kilometres (50 miles) north-west of the Adelaide city centre and about 6.9 kilometres (4.3 miles) of the centre of Ardrossan.

Its boundaries were created in May 1999 in respect to the "long established name".

As of 2014, the land use within the locality is divided into the following two zones that are parallel to the coastline: a strip of land zoned as "coastal open space", which is reserved both for community use and as a buffer against sea level rise, and a strip of land zoned as "settlement", which consists of an area of low density residential and associated buildings.

Rogues Point is located within the federal division of Grey, the state electoral district of Narungga and the local government area of the Yorke Peninsula Council.

Windara Reef is as of 2021 Australia's largest oyster reef restoration project, and the largest outside of the United States. The name "Windara" refers to the Narungga name for the area where the reef is located, which is about 7 kilometres (4.3 mi) south of Ardrossan, near Rogues Point, at a depth of about 8 to 10 metres.

== See also ==
- List of cities and towns in South Australia
