= Stansbury, South Australia =

Stansbury
- Town
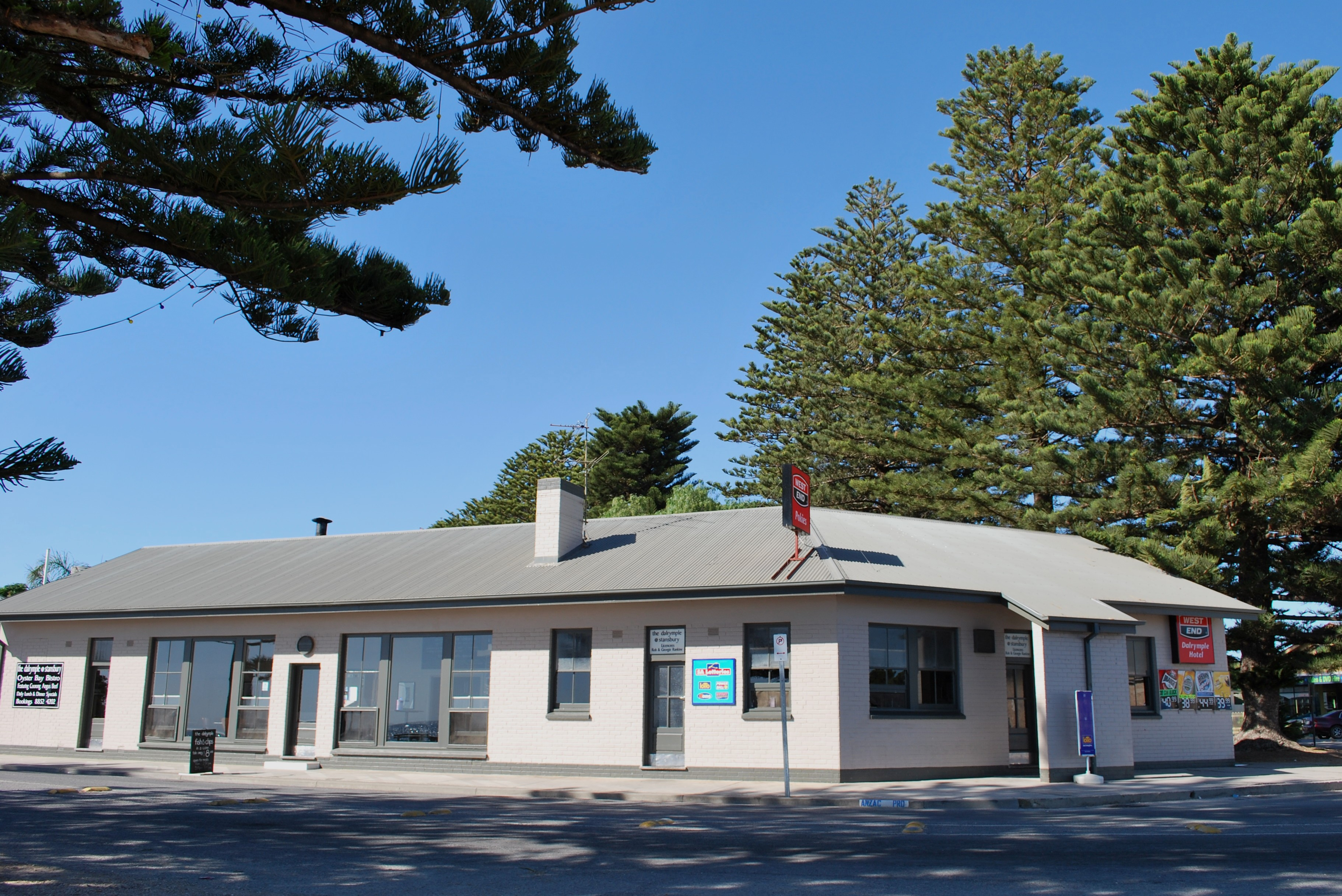
- Dalrymple Hotel at Stansbury

- Coordinates: 34°55′0″S 137°47′0″E
- Country: Australia
- State: South Australia
- LGA: Yorke Peninsula Council
- Location: 204 km (127 mi) W of Adelaide; 116 km (72 mi) S of Kadina; 25 km (16 mi) SE of Minlaton
- Established: 1873

Government
  - State electorate: Narungga
  - Federal division: Grey

Population
  - Total: 480 (UCL 2021)
- Time zone: ACST; UTC+09:30
- Postcode: 5582
Localities around Stansbury
Ramsay	Port Vincent	Gulf St Vincent
Yorketown	Stansbury	Gulf St Vincent
Yorketown	Wool Bay	Gulf St Vincent

Stansbury (postcode 5582) is a small town, located in the southern east coast of Yorke Peninsula, South Australia. It is located 25 kilometres (16 mi) south of Minlaton and 22 kilometres (14 mi) east of Yorketown. It faces the Gulf St Vincent across Oyster Bay, where shellfish were originally harvested in the 19th century. The town has also been a port used in the export of wheat and barley to Adelaide.

== History ==
The town was originally known as Oyster Bay, although it was officially proclaimed Stansbury in 1873 by Governor Anthony Musgrave, in honour of a friend.

In 2009, Stansbury was voted as South Australia's tidiest town.

== Economy ==
The town was used heavily as a port in past times, predominantly in the export of wheat and barley to Adelaide. The local economy is still dominated by broadacre cereal cropping.

=== Dalrymple substation ===
Dalrymple electrical substation is located at Hayward Corner in the locality of Stansbury, just south of the township. Its name is based on the Hundred of Dalrymple, the cadastral division in which Stansbury lies.

Dalrymple substation is at the end of a 275 kV power line into the peninsula. It feeds 33 kV lines to various towns across the lower end of the peninsula and receives electricity generated by the Wattle Point Wind Farm.

The Dalrymple ESCRI battery was completed in January 2019 adjacent to the substation.

=== Market ===
As of 2018, from mid-autumn to mid-spring, the Stansbury seaside market is held about once a month on Saturday mornings on the foreshore. The country-style market was the first of its kind to be established on Yorke Peninsula region.

== Facilities ==
The beach at Stansbury offers a permanently moored pontoon, and VAC swim operates out of this location in the summer school holidays.

The town has two caravan parks, as well as two holiday motels and a hotel in the center of town.

== Gallery ==
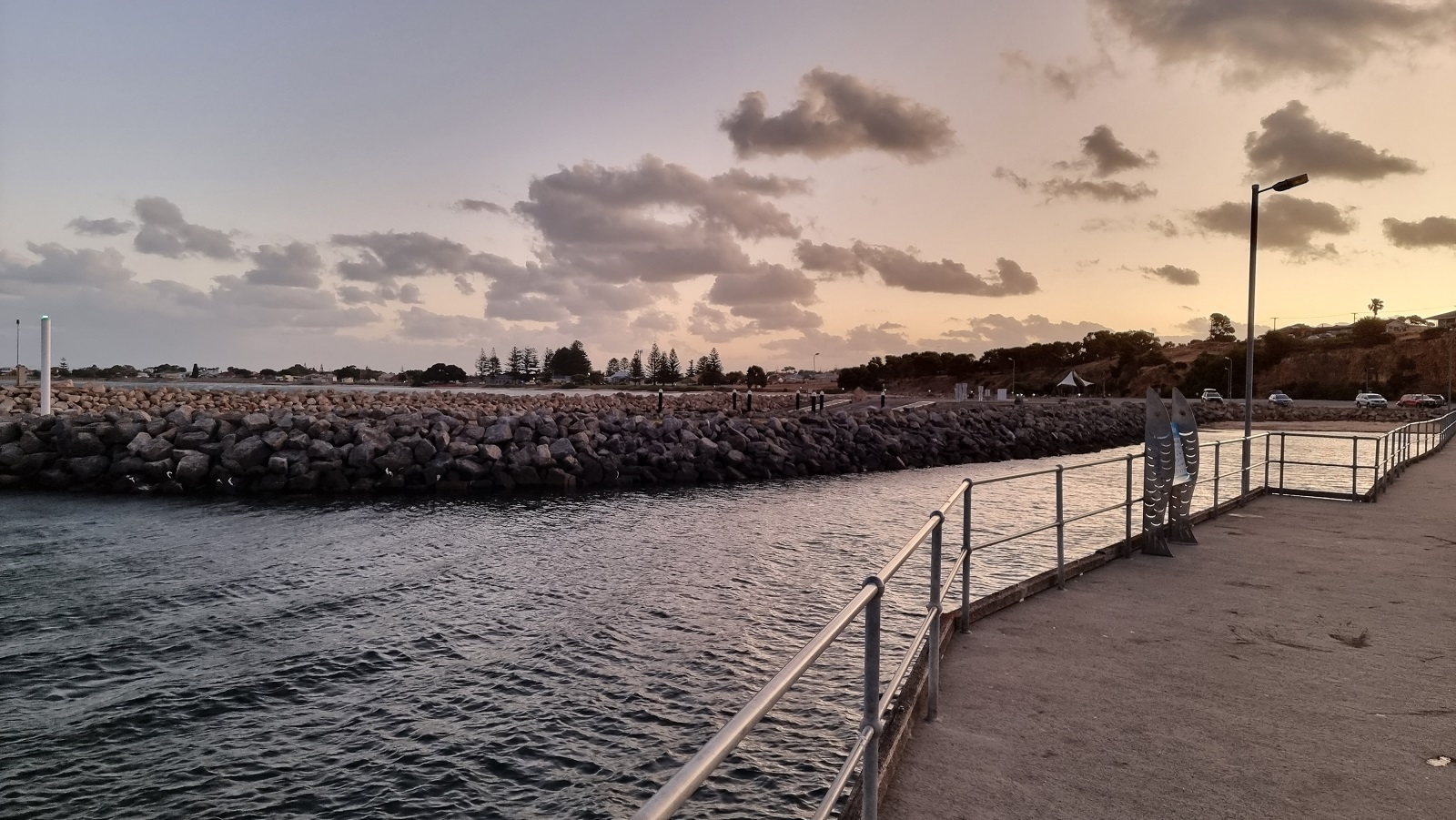
Stansbury Jetty

== See also ==
- List of cities and towns in South Australia
