= Moonta Mines, South Australia =

Moonta Mines South Australia
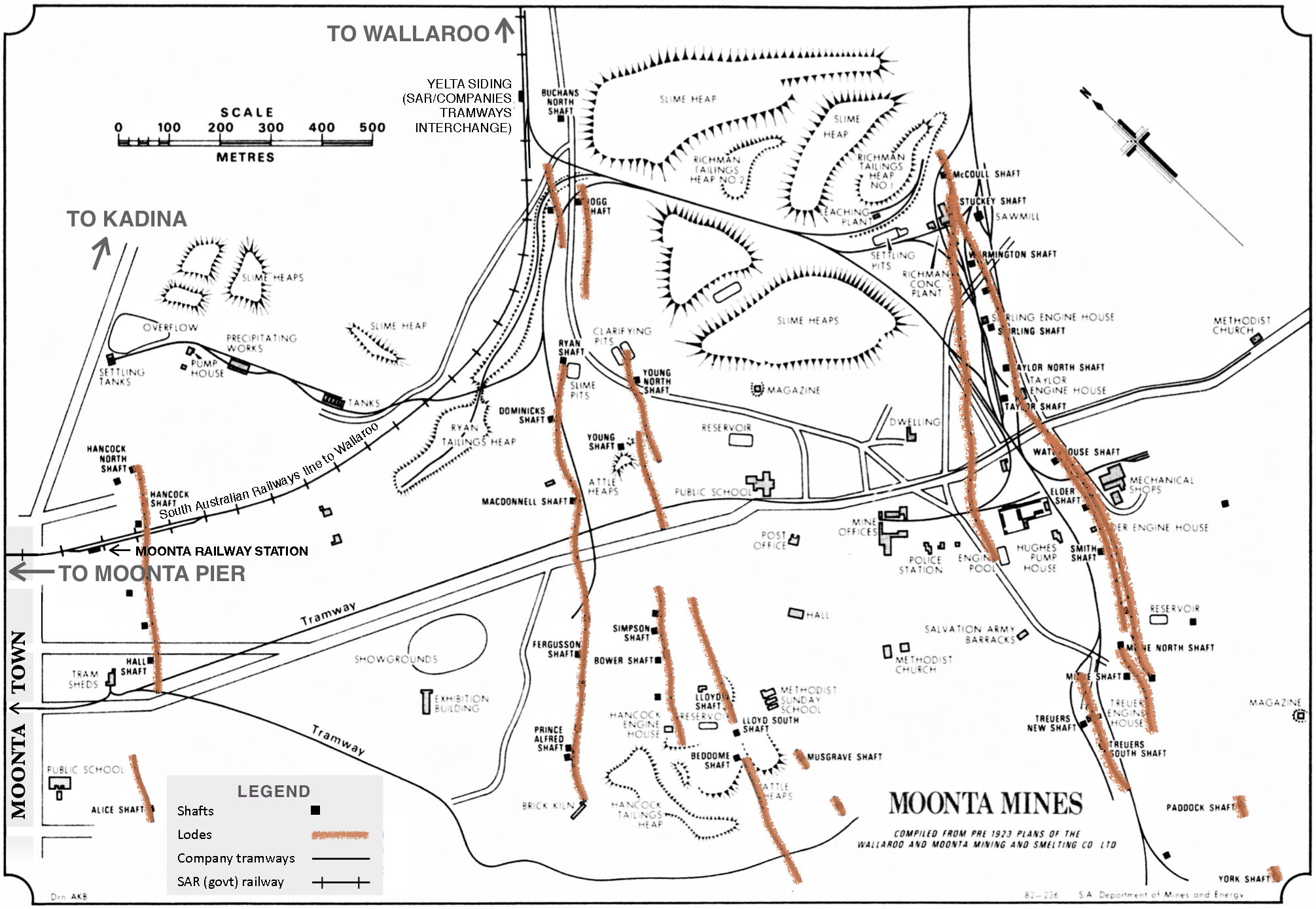
- Map of Moonta Mines pre-1923 (click to enlarge)

- Coordinates: 34.075810°S 137.601150°E
- Population: 177 (SAL 2021)
- Postcode(s): 5558
- LGA(s): Copper Coast Council
- State electorate(s): Goyder
- Federal division(s): Grey
Localities around Moonta Mines:
Moonta	Moonta	Yelta
Kooroona; Hamley	Moonta Mines	East Moonta
Nalyappa	Agery	Agery
- Footnotes: Coordinates

Moonta Mines is a locality at the northern end of the Yorke Peninsula, adjoining the town of Moonta. It is located in the Copper Coast Council. From 1861 to 1923, it was the centre of a copper mining industry that formed colonial South Australia's largest mining enterprise. A substantial portion of the locality is listed on the South Australian Heritage Register as the Moonta Mines State Heritage Area and on the National Heritage List as the Australian Cornish Mining Heritage Site, Moonta Mines.

== History ==
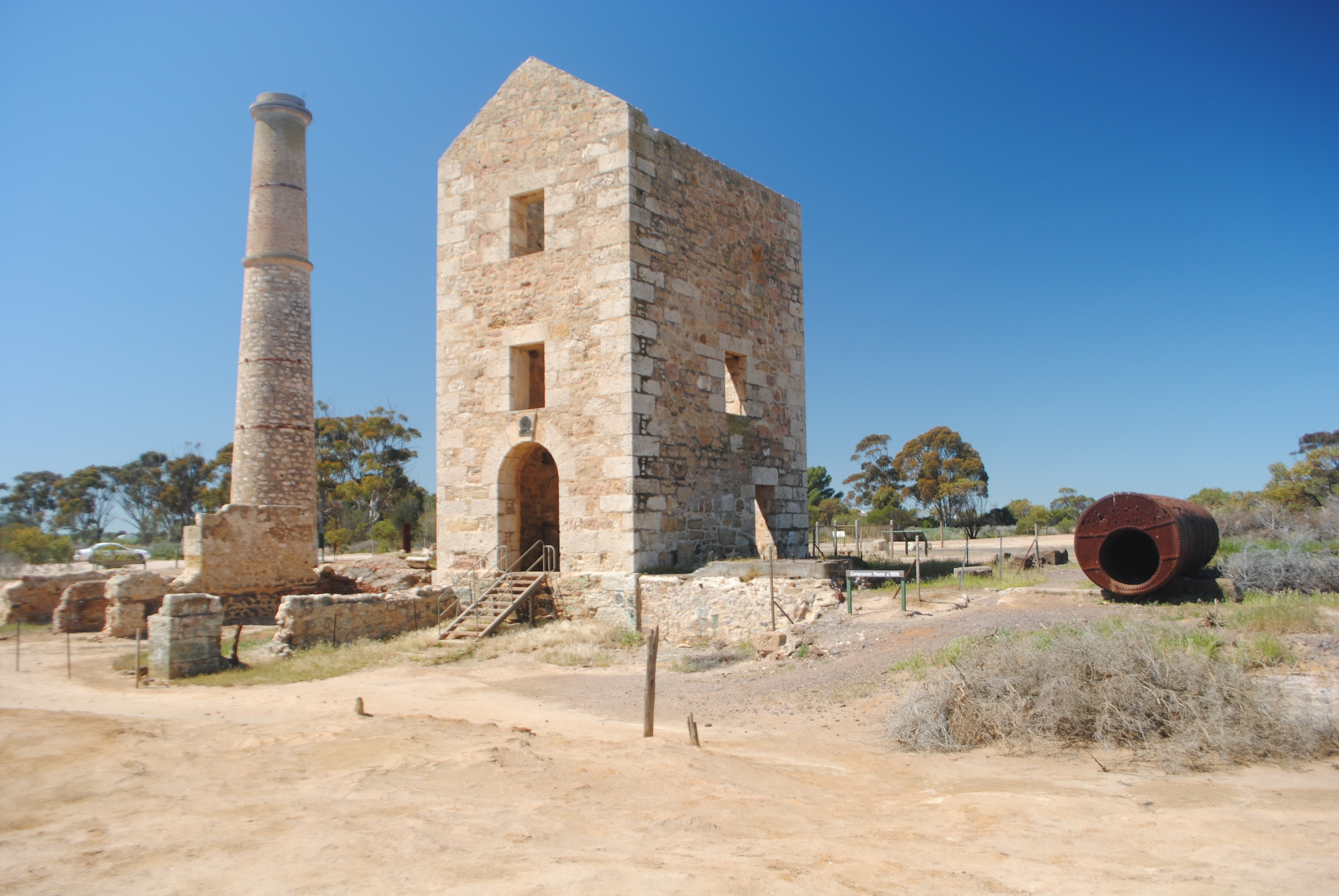
Hughes's enginehouse, similar to Richman's enginehouse in the photo below below

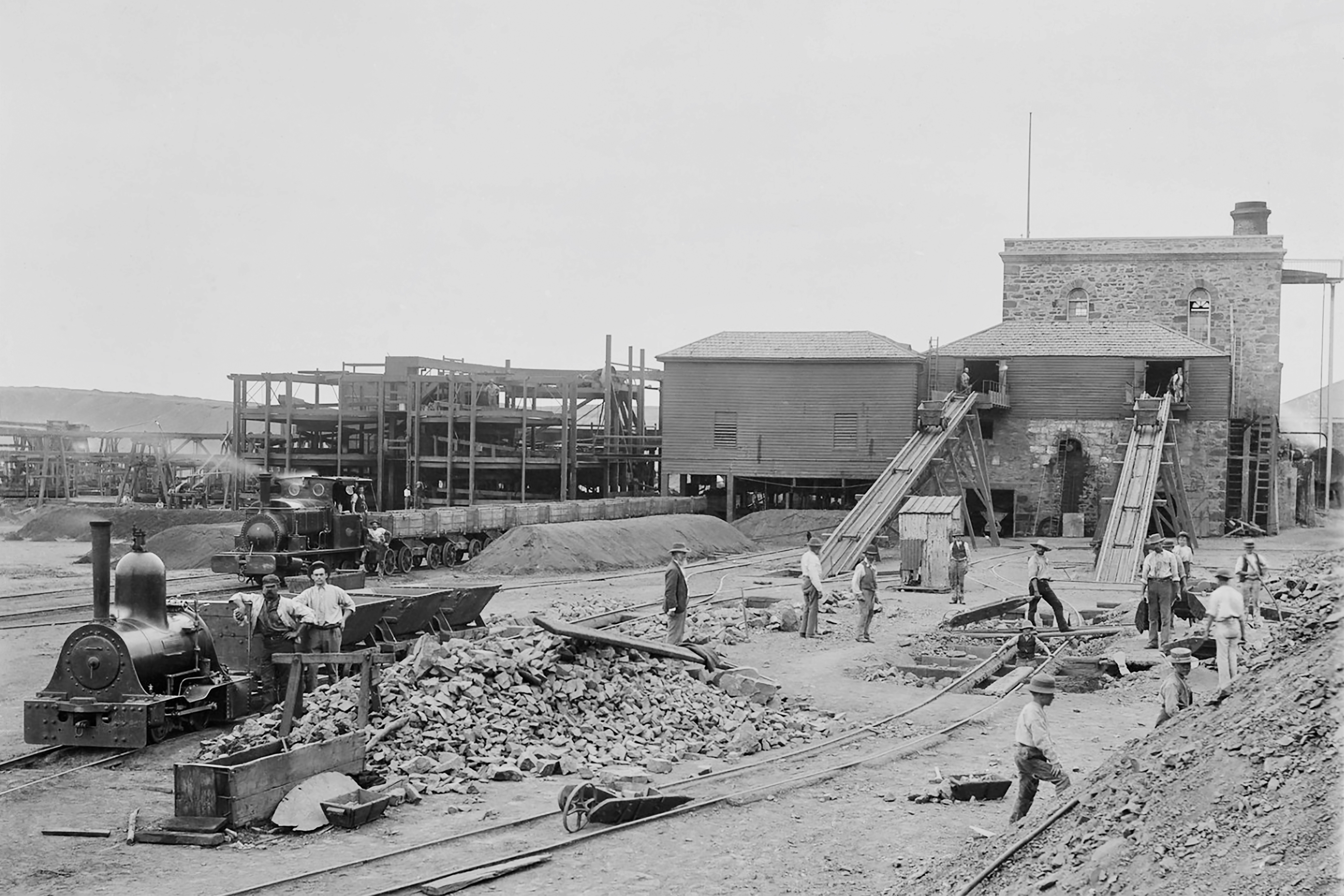
Richman's Plant during the 1890s – copper ore processing plant, workers and two steam locomotives. (Note: The locomotives are Beyer, Peacock 0-4-0 WT (Works Number 3057) (foreground) and Hudswell Clarke 0-4-2 ST (Works Number 394).) Behind the timber buildings is the enginehouse, the shell of which remains at the site; the beam engine protrudes on its right, just below the overhanging gangway.

Patrick " Paddy " Ryan, a shepherd for pastoralist Sir Walter Hughes, discovered copper on Hughes' property at Moonta in May 1861. The Tiparra Mining Association (later the Moonta Mining Company) commenced operations in 1862 after a legal battle over title to the claim. It proved extremely successful, with the Moonta deposits resulting in high yields. It saw a particular influx of miners from Cornwall in England. The government town of Moonta was surveyed in 1863, which resulted in a division between the professional classes in Moonta and a more informal township dominated by mining workers at Moonta Mines. The Moonta miners' undertook a major strike in 1864 over concerns about mining practices.

By 1875, the success of the Moonta Mines and those in the surrounding area had made Moonta the second largest town in South Australia and the largest copper region in the British Empire; Moonta Mines itself had a population of 5,000 residents. In 1876, the Moonta Mining Company became the first mining company in Australia to pay out one million pounds in dividends. However, living conditions were poor and many people died to disease during this time. Copper prices had begun to decline by the 1880s, and in 1889 forced the Moonta Mining Company to merge with the owners of Wallaroo Mines to form the Wallaroo and Moonta Mining and Smelting Co. Ltd. The mine finally closed in 1923, after which the Moonta Mines locality sharply declined, although the cementation works continued in use until 1943. The Moonta Mines State Heritage Area was declared in 1984. The modern locality of Moonta Mines was established in January 1999, when boundaries were formalised for the long established name.

== Industrial railway ==
A narrow gauge steam locomotive was used at the Moonta Mines on the 2 ft 9 in (838 mm) gauge line between Taylor's Shaft and Richman's Plant. Built in 1889 in Manchester, England by Beyer, Peacock & Company it was works number 3057 and was later converted to 3 ft 6 in (1,067 mm) gauge for operation on the mines' railway system. It was sold about 1911 to Henry & Sons, sawmillers of Forrest, Victoria via Cameron & Sutherland, Melbourne dealers.

== Moonta Mines today ==
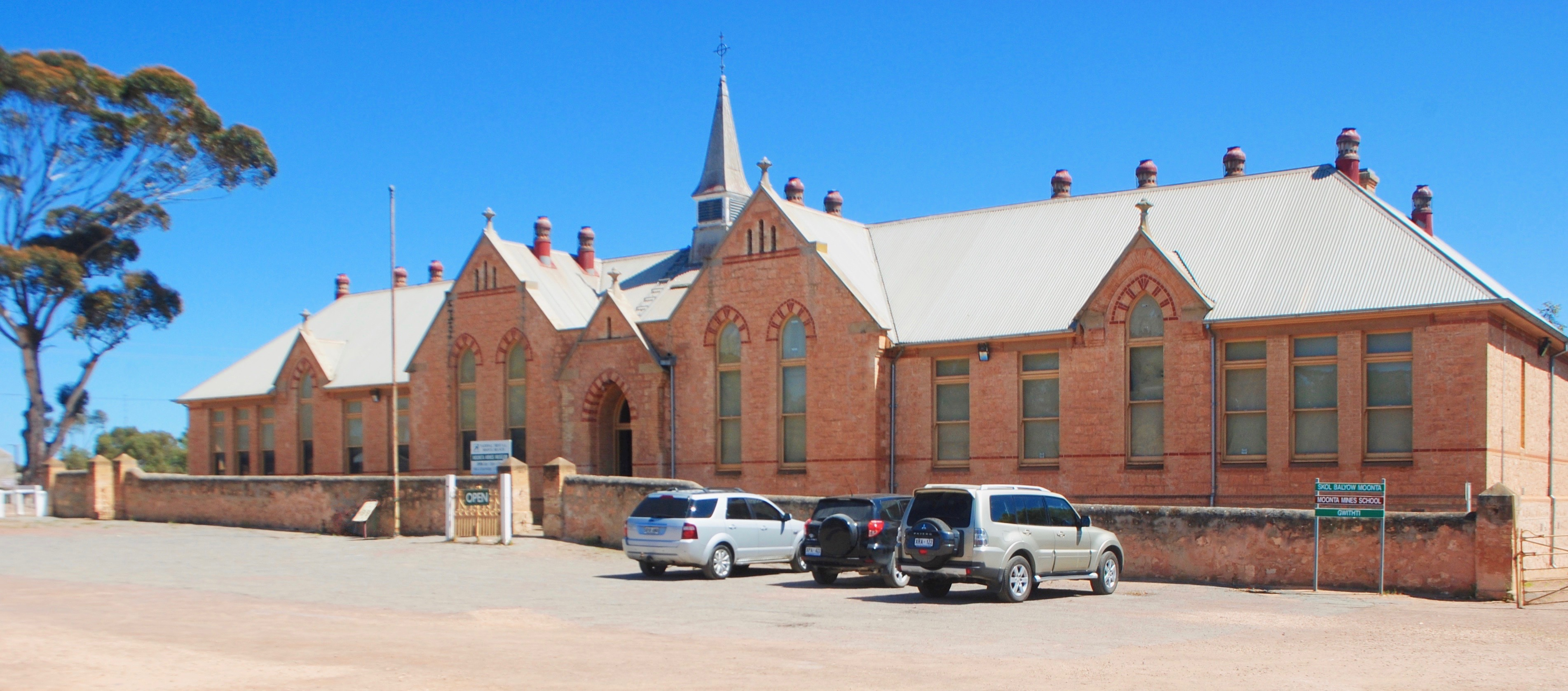
Moonta Mines Museum (formerly Moonta Mines Model School, 1878–1968)

The National Trust of South Australia has a substantial presence at Moonta Mines, operating seven properties as tourist attractions through its Moonta branch. These include the National Trust Museum in the former Moonta Mines Model School (1878-1968), the Moonta Mines Tourist Railway offering 50-minute guided tours of the former mining works, the Moonta Mines Sweet Shop in the former Moonta Mines Post Office building (1946-1970s), a former miners' cottage and garden in Verco Street, the Hughes Enginehouse (1865-1923), Richmans Enginehouse (1869-1923) and the Family History and Resource Centre in the former School of Mines.

The historic Moonta Mines Uniting Church, which dates from 1865 when it opened as the Wesleyan Methodist church, remains in operation with weekly services. It also has open days during the week or on weekends, depending upon the time of year.

== Heritage listings ==
Moonta Mines contains a number of individually heritage-listed sites, including:

- 557 Milne Street: Moonta Mines Uniting Church
- Moonta Mines Model Sunday School Site
- Verco Street: 1870 Miners' Cottage
- 487 Verran Terrace: Moonta Mines Model School
- Hughes Enginehouse and Chimney
