= Nalyappa, South Australia =

Nalyappa South Australia
- Coordinates: 34°09′29″S 137°32′35″E
- Population: 18 (SAL 2021)
- Established: 1999
- Postcode(s): 5558
- Time zone: ACST (UTC+9:30)
  - Summer (DST): ACST (UTC+10:30)
- Location: 128 km (80 mi) north-west of Adelaide
- LGA(s): Yorke Peninsula Council
- Region: Yorke and Mid North
- County: Daly
- State electorate(s): Narungga
- Federal division(s): Grey
Mean max temp	Mean min temp	Annual rainfall
23.8 °C; 75 °F	9.8 °C; 50 °F	330.1 mm 13 in
Suburbs around Nalyappa:
Spencer Gulf	Port Hughes; Kooroona	Moonta Mines
Spencer Gulf	Nalyappa	Agery
Spencer Gulf	Balgowan	Weetulta
- Footnotes: Distances; Adjoining localities

Nalyappa is a locality in the Australian state of South Australia located on the west coast of Yorke Peninsula immediately adjoining Spencer Gulf about 128 kilometres (80 miles) north-west of the state capital of Adelaide.

Its boundaries which were created in May 1999 for the “long established name” which is derived from a Narungga (i.e. local aboriginal people) word ‘Nhalyabba.’

Its coastline includes Tiparra Bay and its southern headland, Cape Elizabeth.

As of 2016, land use within the locality consisted of agriculture being the major use followed by conservation being associated with the coastline adjoining Spencer Gulf.

Nalyappa is located within the federal division of Grey, the state electoral district of Narungga and the local government area of the Yorke Peninsula Council.
