= Fraser Ellis =

Former Australian politician

Member of the South Australian House of Assembly for Narungga
- In office 17 March 2018 – 21 March 2026
- Preceded by: New seat
- Succeeded by: Chantelle Thomas

Personal details
- Born: Fraser John Ellis; 17 August 1992 (age 34) Toorak Gardens, South Australia
- Party: Independent (2021–present); Liberal (2018–2021)
- Education: University of South Australia
- Occupation: Lawyer; journalist

Fraser John Ellis (born 17 August 1992) is a former Australian politician. He was elected as a Liberal member of the South Australian House of Assembly at the 2018 state election, representing Narungga. On 18 February 2021, Ellis suspended his membership of the Liberal Party after being charged by the Independent Commission Against Corruption (ICAC) with offences relating to travel allowances. Ellis, who qualified as a lawyer, worked as a journalist before his election.

== Accommodation allowance ==
In June 2020, Ellis repaid $42,130 in allowances claimed for staying in Adelaide at the residence of a colleague. In February 2021, Ellis informed the House of Assembly that he had been charged with offences arising from an investigation by the Independent Commission Against Corruption (ICAC) into his use of the Country Members' Accommodation Allowance, which permits regional MPs living more than 75 kilometres from Adelaide to claim up to $234 a night when they are in the city on official business. He was alleged to have made 78 fraudulent claims totalling over $18,000 for nights he did not spend in Adelaide. He was charged with 23 counts of deception, and stated that he denied the allegations and intended to defend the charges.

Following his announcement to parliament, Ann Vanstone, the Independent Commissioner Against Corruption, released a statement confirming that she had referred a brief to the Director of Public Prosecutions in December 2020. Ellis was summonsed to appear in the Adelaide Magistrates Court on 31 March 2021.

Ellis' trial was delayed until June 2022 to allow time for the High Court of Australia to rule on a similar case relating to another South Australian member of parliament, Troy Bell. That meant the case would not be resolved before the 2022 South Australian state election. Because Ellis had voluntarily suspended his own membership of the South Australia Liberal Party, he announced that he would ask to be endorsed as a Liberal candidate in the election. However, the Liberal Party declined to do so and ran an endorsed candidate against him. Ellis won the seat as an independent against the Liberal-endorsed candidate. In June, Ellis's lawyers sought a permanent stay of proceedings on the grounds that the evidence was "subject to the absolute protection of parliamentary privilege". The application was rejected on 10 August 2022, with his trial set to continue later in the month.

In July 2024, Ellis was found guilty of four counts of deception over his misuse of the Country Members Accommodation Allowance.

Eliis was defeated in the 2026 South Australian state election.

South Australian House of Assembly
New seat	Member for Narungga; 2018–2026	Succeeded by Chantelle Thomas
