= District Council of Minlaton =

District Council of Minlaton South Australia
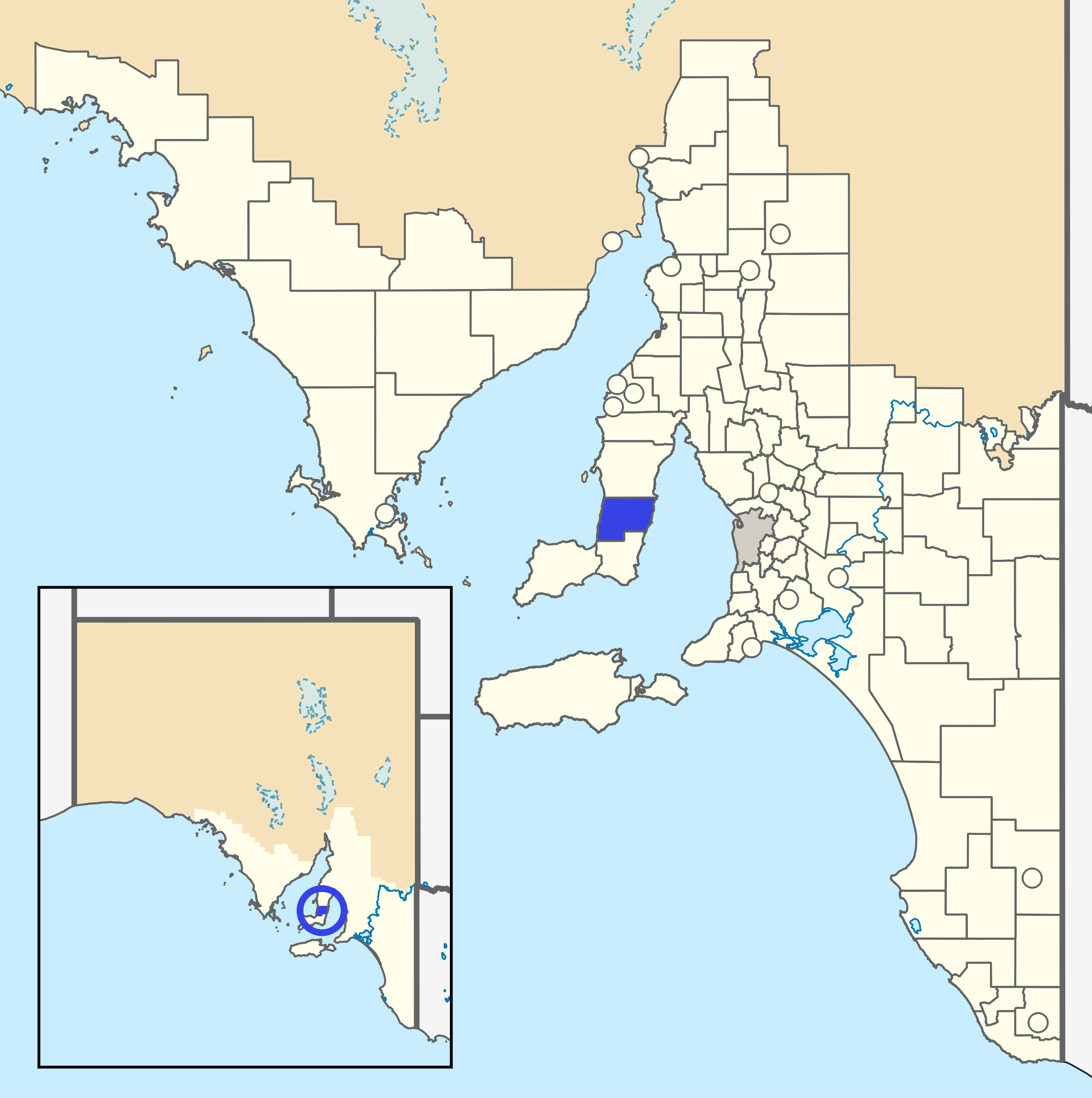
- The District Council of Minlaton as it was prior to disestablishment (blue)
- Coordinates: 34°45′0″S 137°39′24″E
- Established: 1888
- Abolished: 1997
- Council seat: Minlaton
LGAs around District Council of Minlaton:
Spencer Gulf	Yorke Peninsula (1888–1969); Central Yorke Peninsula (1969–1997)	Gulf St Vincent
Spencer Gulf	District Council of Minlaton	Gulf St Vincent
Melville (1888–1932); Yorketown (1932–1997); Warooka (1888–1997)	Dalrymple (1888–1932); Melville (1888–1932); Yorketown (1932–1997)	Gulf St Vincent

The District Council of Minlaton was a local government area in South Australia from 1888 to 1997 seated at Minlaton on the Yorke Peninsula.

== History ==
The District Council of Minlaton was officially proclaimed on 5 January 1888 by the District Councils Act 1887 as constituting the Hundreds of Curramulka, Koolywurtie and Minlacowie, and the unincorporated portion of the Hundred of Ramsay. This cluster of adjacent hundreds spanned the entire width of the peninsula at Minlaton for about 29 kilometres (18 mi) north to south.

The first council meeting was held on 13 February 1888 and John C Tonkin was elected chairman. Prior to 1920 council meetings were held in the Minlaton Institute or in other rented rooms.

In November 1907 the council annexed portions of the hundreds of Muloowurtie and Wauraltee from the Yorke Peninsula council.

In June 1908 portions of the Hundred of Ramsay were severed from the council and annexed by the District Council of Dalrymple.

In 1920 the first council chambers were built in Minlaton. Then in 1939 the council seat was moved to the new town hall of Minlaton.

The council ceased to exist in 1997 when it was amalgamated with the councils of Central Yorke Peninsula, Warooka and Yorketown to form the second iteration of the District Council of Yorke Peninsula.

== Neighbouring local government ==
The following adjacent local government bodies co-existed with the Minlaton council:

- District Council of Yorke Peninsula (established 1888) lay immediately north until 1969, when it became the District Council of Central Yorke Peninsula following the amalgamation of the former and Maitland councils.
- District Council of Dalrymple (established 1877) lay south until 1932 when it was amalgamated into the District Council of Yorketown
- District Council of Melville (established 1875) lay south and south west until 1932 when it was amalgamated with Dalrymple into the Yorketown council.
- District Council of Warooka also lay south west from its establishment in 1888, six months after Minlaton council, being formed by separation of a west portion of the Corporate Town of Yorketown.
