= District Council of Yorke Peninsula (former) =

Coordinates: 34°28′S 137°41′E

The District Council of Yorke Peninsula was a local government area on the Yorke Peninsula of South Australia from 1888 to 1969.

== History ==
The District Council of Yorke Peninsula was officially proclaimed on 5 January 1888 by the District Councils Act 1887 as constituting the Hundreds of Cunningham, Kilkerran, Wauraltee and Muloowurtie, and the unincorporated portion of the Hundred of Maitland. This cluster of adjacent hundreds spanned the entire width of the peninsula south of Port Wakefield for about 38 kilometres (24 mi) north to south.

In 1969 the council was amalgamated with the Corporate Town of Maitland, at the instigation of residents of both councils, to form the new District Council of Central Yorke Peninsula.

== Neighbouring local government ==
Being located on lands spanning the entire width of a peninsula, the Yorke Peninsula council had neighbouring local government bodies to the north and south only. The District Council of Clinton (established 1878) lay immediately north and the District Council of Minlaton (established 1888) lay immediately south for the entire lifespan of the Yorke Peninsula council.
