= Chantelle Thomas =

Australian politician

Chantelle Thomas MP

Member of the South Australian House of Assembly for Narungga
- Incumbent
- Assumed office 21 March 2026
- Preceded by: Fraser Ellis

Personal details
- Born: 1995 or 1996 (age 30–31) Gawler, South Australia, Australia
- Party: One Nation

Chantelle Marie Thomas (born 1995 or 1996) is an Australian politician. A member of One Nation, she has represented the district of Narungga in the South Australian House of Assembly since the 2026 state election.

== Early life and education ==
Chantelle Thomas was born in 1995 or 1996.

== Career ==
=== Early career ===
Thomas has previously worked in hospitality and as a counsellor with Lifeline. At the time of proposing her candidacy for One Nation, she described her occupations as photographer and make-up artist.

=== Political career ===
Thomas was announced as a candidate for the 2026 South Australian state election in January 2026, representing One Nation in the district of Narungga. At the time, Narungga was held by Fraser Ellis, a former Liberal who left the party to become an independent. In 2024, Ellis was found guilty of deception in relation to the misuse of his parliamentary allowances.

Thomas's website focused on health care, saying "One Nation will crack down on Medicare fraud and implement reforms to better remunerate GPs so they can bulk-bill". During her campaign for office, federal leader of One Nation Pauline Hanson and SA leader Cory Bernardi flew in to her electorate to lend support.

At the 2026 election, although it was clear Ellis had been defeated, Thomas and Liberal candidate Tania Stock both remained in contention as counting progressed. Following a recount, Thomas was confirmed as the MP for Narungga, leading Stock by 58 votes in the two-candidate preferred vote and becoming one of four One Nation members of the House of Assembly. On 16 April, after Narungga was declared for Thomas, 81 unopened ballots for the seat were discovered by the Electoral Commission of South Australia. In an indicative count performed the following day, acting Electoral Commissioner Leah McLay declared that the missing ballot papers would have increased Thomas' margin of victory from 58 to 74 votes.

== Personal life ==
Thomas grew up in Gawler. She is married to Daniel Thomas, a former member of the Royal Australian Air Force, with whom she has three children. As of March 2026, she lives in Kadina on the Yorke Peninsula.

South Australian House of Assembly
Preceded by Fraser Ellis	Member for Narungga; 2026–present	Incumbent
