= Maitland, South Australia =

Maitland
- Town
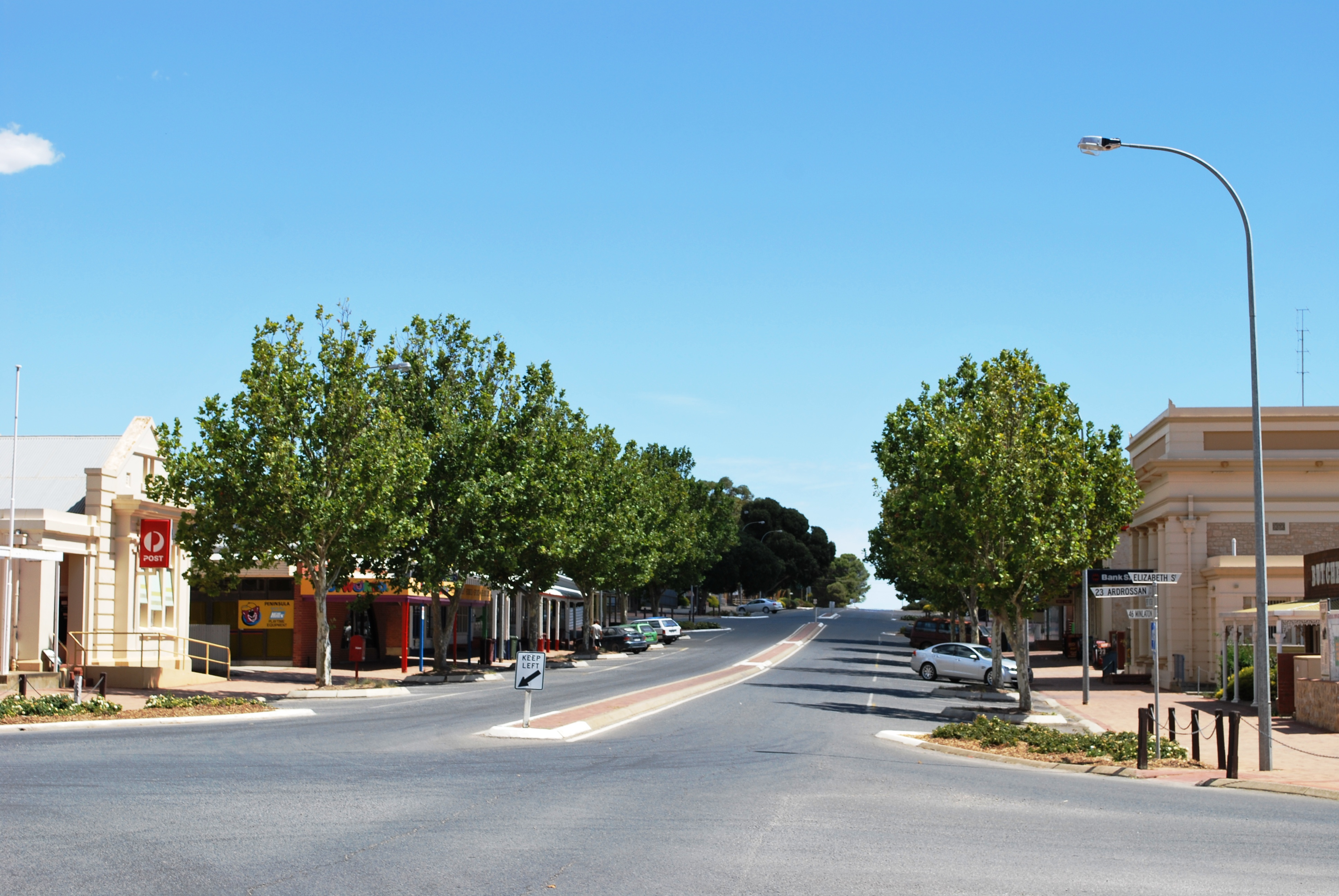
- Robert St in Maitland

- Coordinates: 34°22′0″S 137°40′0″E
- Country: Australia
- State: South Australia
- Region: Yorke and Mid North
- LGA: Yorke Peninsula Council
- Location: 168 km (104 mi) west of Adelaide; 164 km (102 mi) south of Port Pirie; 50 km (31 mi) south of Kadina; 46 km (29 mi) north of Minlaton
- Established: 1872

Government
  - State electorate: Narungga
  - Federal division: Grey
- Elevation: 160 m (520 ft)

Population
  - Total: 1,079 (UCL 2021)
- Postcode: 5573
- County: Fergusson
- Mean max temp: 22.5 °C (72.5 °F)
- Mean min temp: 11.7 °C (53.1 °F)
- Annual rainfall: 482.5 mm (19.00 in)
Localities around Maitland
Balgowan	Weetulta; Arthurton	Arthurton; Winulta
Balgowan	Maitland	Winulta; Petersville
Point Pearce	South Kilkerran; Yorke Valley; Cunningham	Cunningham

Maitland (/ˈmeɪtlənd/) is a town on the Yorke Peninsula in South Australia. By road, it is 168 km (104 mi) west of Adelaide, 164 km (102 mi) south of Port Pirie and 46 km (29 mi) north of Minlaton. The town lies in the traditional lands of the Narungga, whose name for the district is Maggiwarda.

== History ==
The town was established on the Yorke Peninsula, the traditional lands of the Narungga, an Aboriginal Australian people, who had lived there for thousands of years. Their name for the peninsula is Guuranda, and the Maitland district was Maggiwarda.

The town was named in 1872 after Lady Jean Maitland, the wife of James Fergusson, Lord Kilkerran and great-great grandmother of the governor of South Australia at that time, Sir James Fergusson.

In October 1884 the Adelaide Observer noted:

Maitland in situated about twenty-three miles from Moonta, on Yorke's Peninsula, and is about equidistant between the two Gulfs. The town stands about 490 feet above the sea, and is surrounded by some of the richest soil on the Peninsula. The township is only about nine years old, and has made steady progress, and bids fair to be the next largest town to Moonta on the Peninsula.

Agriculture was developed on lands formerly used as hunting grounds for the Narungga people, and they were employed in agricultural work from where they were moved to at Point Pearce (Burgiyana) mission.

Historical population
Year	Pop.	±%
1921	480	—
1933	669	+39.4%
1947	700	+4.6%
1954	817	+16.7%
1961	989	+21.1%
1966	1,017	+2.8%
1971	1,020	+0.3%
1976	1,017	−0.3%
1981	1,085	+6.7%
1986	1,103	+1.7%
1991	1,066	−3.4%
1996	999	−6.3%
2001	992	−0.7%
2006	1,056	+6.5%
2011	1,047	−0.9%
2016	1,029	−1.7%
2021	1,079	+4.9%
Source: Australian Bureau of Statistics data.

== Location and description ==
Maitland is within a short driving distance of coastal towns on either side, with Port Victoria to the west and Ardrossan to the east, each within 25 km. It has a grain receiving depot operated by AWB Limited, serviced only by road.

== Climate ==
Maitland has a hot-summer mediterranean climate (Köppen: Csa), with very warm, dry summers and mild, wetter winters. Temperatures vary throughout the year, with average maxima ranging from 29.3 °C (84.7 °F) in January to 14.3 °C (57.7 °F) in July, and average minima fluctuating between 15.9 °C (60.6 °F) in February and 7.0 °C (44.6 °F) in July. Annual precipitation is moderately low, averaging 502.5 mm (19.78 in), with a maximum in winter. There are 109.8 precipitation days, 95.8 clear days and 133.4 cloudy days annually. Extreme temperatures have ranged from 46.3 °C (115.3 °F) on 24 January 2019 to 0.0 °C (32.0 °F) on 29 June 1958 and 9 July 1959.

Climate data for Maitland (34º22'12"S, 137º40'12"E, 185 m AMSL) (1879-2024 normals, extremes 1957-2024)
Month	Jan	Feb	Mar	Apr	May	Jun	Jul	Aug	Sep	Oct	Nov	Dec	Year
Record high °C (°F)	46.3 (115.3)	43.5 (110.3)	40.7 (105.3)	37.0 (98.6)	29.0 (84.2)	25.0 (77.0)	21.8 (71.2)	28.0 (82.4)	33.8 (92.8)	37.9 (100.2)	42.4 (108.3)	46.0 (114.8)	46.3 (115.3)
Mean daily maximum °C (°F)	29.3 (84.7)	28.5 (83.3)	25.9 (78.6)	22.4 (72.3)	18.2 (64.8)	15.5 (59.9)	14.3 (57.7)	15.5 (59.9)	18.1 (64.6)	21.6 (70.9)	24.9 (76.8)	26.4 (79.5)	21.7 (71.1)
Mean daily minimum °C (°F)	15.8 (60.4)	15.9 (60.6)	14.5 (58.1)	12.6 (54.7)	10.0 (50.0)	7.9 (46.2)	7.0 (44.6)	7.2 (45.0)	8.5 (47.3)	10.1 (50.2)	12.3 (54.1)	13.8 (56.8)	11.3 (52.3)
Record low °C (°F)	7.7 (45.9)	8.9 (48.0)	7.2 (45.0)	4.4 (39.9)	4.0 (39.2)	0.0 (32.0)	0.0 (32.0)	1.1 (34.0)	1.1 (34.0)	1.8 (35.2)	4.4 (39.9)	6.5 (43.7)	0.0 (32.0)
Average precipitation mm (inches)	18.0 (0.71)	21.9 (0.86)	20.6 (0.81)	42.3 (1.67)	62.4 (2.46)	68.1 (2.68)	65.3 (2.57)	61.5 (2.42)	49.1 (1.93)	41.1 (1.62)	28.4 (1.12)	23.9 (0.94)	502.5 (19.78)
Average precipitation days (≥ 0.2 mm)	3.9	3.6	4.6	8.3	12.1	14.2	15.3	14.6	11.7	9.7	6.5	5.3	109.8
Average afternoon relative humidity (%)	35	39	42	48	59	64	66	62	56	46	40	39	50
Average dew point °C (°F)	9.4 (48.9)	10.4 (50.7)	9.6 (49.3)	8.5 (47.3)	8.1 (46.6)	7.3 (45.1)	6.7 (44.1)	6.5 (43.7)	6.9 (44.4)	6.6 (43.9)	7.1 (44.8)	8.3 (46.9)	7.9 (46.2)
Source: Bureau of Meteorology (1879-2024 normals, extremes 1957-2024)

== Media ==
Maitland was home to a newspaper called the Maitland Watch (22 December 1911 – 26 June 1969). In 1969, the newspaper merged with Yorketown's the Pioneer (1898–1969) to become the short-lived Yorke Peninsula News Pictorial (3 July 1969 – 28 May 1970), which was then incorporated into the Yorke Peninsula Country Times from June 1970.

== See also ==
- List of cities and towns in South Australia
- John Shannon (Australian politician)
