= Yorke Peninsula Council =

- Local government area
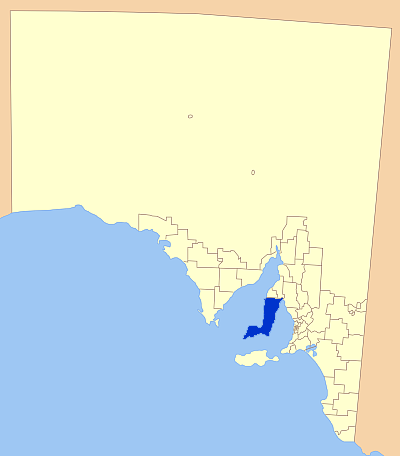
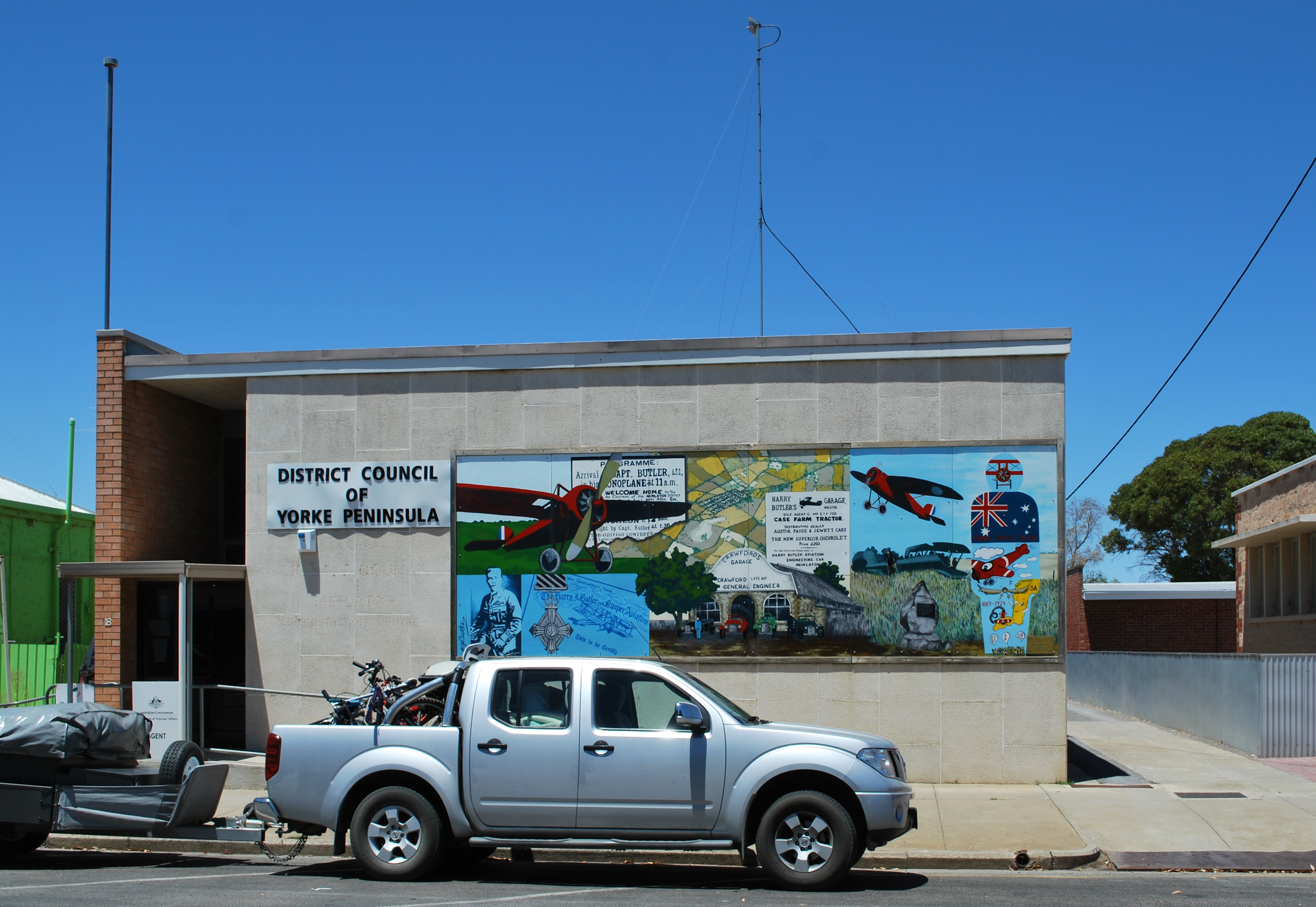
- Location of the Yorke Peninsula Council Council branch office at Minlaton

- Interactive map of Yorke Peninsula Council
- Country: Australia
- State: South Australia
- Region: Yorke and Mid North
- Established: 10 February 1997
- Council seat: Maitland

Government
  - Mayor: Darren Braund
  - State electorate: Narungga

Area
  - Total: 5,834 km^{2} (2,253 sq mi)

Population
  - Total: 11,598 (LGA 2021)
- Website: Yorke Peninsula Council
LGAs around Yorke Peninsula Council
	Copper Coast	Barunga West; Wakefield
Spencer Gulf	Yorke Peninsula Council	Gulf St Vincent
	Investigator Strait

The Yorke Peninsula Council is a local government area in South Australia. Its boundaries include most of the Yorke Peninsula. The main Council office is at Maitland; the council also maintains branch offices at Minlaton and Yorketown.

== History ==
It came into existence on 10 February 1997 as a result of the amalgamation of the District Council of Central Yorke Peninsula, the District Council of Minlaton, the District Council of Warooka and the District Council of Yorketown. It was named as the District Council of Yorke Peninsula at its inception, but was renamed to Yorke Peninsula Council in 2013.

== Extent ==
Yorke Peninsula Council includes the towns and localities of:

- Agery
- Ardrossan
- Arthurton
- Balgowan
- Black Point
- Bluff Beach
- Brentwood
- Chinaman Wells
- Clinton
- Clinton Centre
- Coobowie
- Corny Point
- Couch Beach
- Cunningham
- Curramulka
- Dowlingville
- Edithburgh
- Foul Bay
- Hardwicke Bay
- Honiton
- Inneston
- James Well
- Kainton
- Koolywurtie
- Maitland
- Marion Bay
- Minlaton
- Nalyappa
- Parsons Beach
- Petersville
- Pine Point
- Point Pearce
- Point Souttar
- Point Turton
- Port Arthur
- Port Julia
- Port Moorowie
- Port Rickaby
- Port Victoria
- Port Vincent
- Price
- Ramsay
- Rogues Point
- Sandilands
- Sheaoak Flat
- South Kilkerran
- Stansbury
- Sultana Point
- Sunnyvale
- The Pines
- Tiddy Widdy Beach
- Urania
- Warooka
- Wauraltee
- Weetulta
- White Hut
- Winulta
- Wool Bay
- Yorke Valley
- Yorketown

== Councillors ==
Ward	Councillor	Notes
Mayor	Darren Braund	
Gum Flat	Naomi Bittner	
Gum Flat	Trevor Clerke	
Gum Flat	Scott Hoyle	
Innes Pentonvale	Adam Meyer	
Innes Pentonvale	Kristin Murdock	
Innes Pentonvale	Kylie Gray	
Innes Pentonvale	Michael O'Connell	
Kalkabury	Tania Stock	
Kalkabury	Richard Carruthers	
Kalkabury	Roger Johns	
Kalkabury	Alan Headon	

=== Mayors ===
The Yorke Peninsula Council has a directly-elected mayor.

- Thomas Malcolm Thomson (1997-2000)
- Robert Lloyd Schulze (2000-2006)
- Ray Agnew (2006-2018)
- Darren Braund (2018 - current)

== See also ==
- List of parks and gardens in rural South Australia
