= Electoral district of Narungga =

South Australian state electoral district

Narungga South Australia—House of Assembly
- Interactive map of electoral district boundaries
- State: South Australia
- Created: 2016
- MP: Chantelle Thomas
- Party: One Nation
- Namesake: Narungga people
- Electors: 28,266 (2026)
- Area: 11,381 km^{2} (4,394.2 sq mi)
- Demographic: Rural
- Coordinates: 34°S 138°E
Electorates around Narungga:
Giles	Stuart	Ngadjuri
Flinders	Narungga	Ngadjuri
Spencer Gulf	Mawson	Ngadjuri

Footnotes
- Electoral District map

Narungga is a single-member electoral district for the South Australian House of Assembly. It was created by the redistribution of 2016, and was contested for the first time at the 2018 state election. It is named for the Narungga people, who are the traditional owners of the lands in most of the electorate. It is one of two state districts named after South Australia's indigenous people (the other being the electoral district of Kaurna). This country district situated north-west of Adelaide incorporates the entire Yorke Peninsula area, as well as some rural areas immediately to the north and north-east of the top part of Gulf St Vincent. It includes the Yorke Peninsula Council, Copper Coast Council, Barunga West Council and included the western parts of the Wakefield Regional Council and Adelaide Plains Council.

== History ==
Narungga is essentially a reconfigured version of the former seat of Goyder, which itself was created in 1969 as a replacement for Yorke Peninsula. At its creation, it drew 21,993 electors from Goyder and 2,325 from Frome. Of the remaining electors from Goyder, 999 were lost to Frome, 422 to Schubert, and 1,619 to Taylor.

Steven Griffiths had been the member for Goyder since 2006. He announced on 14 February 2017 that he would be retiring from parliament at the 2018 election. Narungga was won for the Liberal Party on the new boundaries by Fraser Ellis. Counting its time as Goyder and Yorke Peninsula, the seat has been held by the Liberals and their predecessors, the Liberal and Country League, for all but seven years since the institution of single-member seats in 1938. It has never been won by the Labor Party in either of its incarnations.

== Members for Narungga ==
Member	Party	Term
Fraser Ellis	Liberal	2018–2020
Fraser Ellis	Independent	2020–2026
Chantelle Thomas	One Nation	2026–present

== Election results ==
2026 South Australian state election: Narungga
Party	Candidate	Votes	%	±%
One Nation	Chantelle Thomas	9,037	37.5	+32.0
Liberal	Tania Stock	5,409	22.5	−7.6
Independent	Fraser Ellis	4,101	17.0	−13.5
Labor	Esther Short	3,745	15.6	−4.6
Greens	Jessica Scriven	692	2.9	+2.9
Legalise Cannabis	Nicole Lornie	451	1.9	+1.9
Family First	John Bennett	334	1.4	−1.9
Australian Family	Maria Vottari	132	0.5	+0.6
Real Change	Joanne Taylerson	122	0.5	+0.5
United Voice	Peter Illingworth	56	0.2	+0.2
Total formal votes		24,079	94.3	
Informal votes		1,444	5.7	
Turnout		25,523		
Two-candidate-preferred result
One Nation	Chantelle Thomas	12,073	50.1	+50.1
Liberal	Tania Stock	12,015	49.9	+8.0
One Nation gain from Independent		Swing	+50.1	

Results are not final. Last updated on 2 April at 8:30pm ACDT.
