= St Vincent Highway =

Road in South Australia, Australia

St Vincent Highway South Australia
- Coordinates: 34.530546°S 137.880012°E (Northeast end); 34.990571°S 137.401000°E (Southwest end)

General information
- Type: Highway
- Length: 102 km (63 mi)
- Route number(s): B88 (1998–present)

Major junctions
- Northeast end: Yorke Highway; Pine Point, South Australia
- Southwest end: Yorke Highway; Warooka, South Australia

Location(s)
- Region: Yorke and Mid North
- Major settlements: Port Vincent, Stansbury, Edithburgh, Yorketown

Highway system
- Highways in Australia; National Highway • Freeways in Australia; Highways in South Australia

St Vincent Highway (route B88) is a major road on the southern part of Yorke Peninsula in South Australia. It diverges from Yorke Highway to continue south along the coast of Gulf St Vincent (where Yorke Highway turns inland) near Pine Point. It passes inland of Port Vincent, Stansbury, Wool Bay and Port Giles then passes through Coobowie and Edithburgh. From here, the St Vincent Highway turns northwest to Yorketown and west to Warooka where it rejoins Yorke Highway.

Rex Minerals propose to realign the northern end of the current St Vincent Highway closer to the coast, and move the intersection with the Yorke Highway closer to Pine Point as part of the construction of the Hillside mine.

== Major intersections ==
St Vincent Highway is entirely contained within the Yorke Peninsula Council local government area.

Location	km	mi	Destinations	Notes
Pine Point	0	0.0	Yorke Highway (B86) – Ardrossan	North-eastern terminus of highway and route B88
Port Vincent	28	17	Port Vincent Road – Minlaton, Port Vincent	
Stansbury	42	26	Minlaton Road – Minlaton, Stansbury	
Wool Bay	48	30	Stansbury Road – Yorketown	Edithburgh bypass road
Edithburgh	65	40	Blanche Street – Edithburgh	
Yorketown	81	50	Stansbury Road (east) – Stansbury; Harry Butler Road (north) – Minlaton	
Warooka	102	63	Yorke Highway – Stenhouse Bay, Minlaton	South-western terminus of highway and route B88
1.000 mi = 1.609 km; 1.000 km = 0.621 mi: Route transition
