= Hundred of Melville =

Melville
- Cadastral division
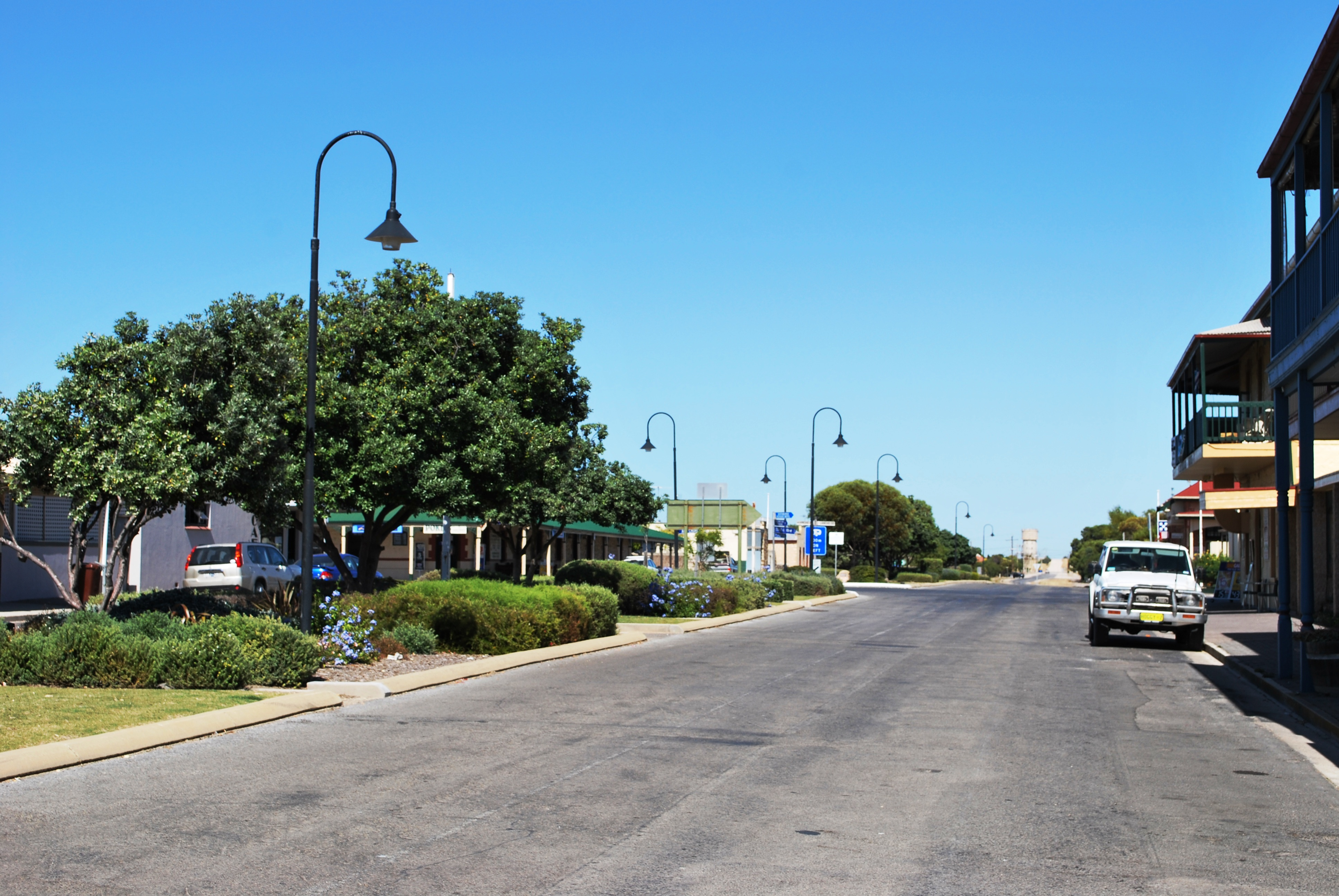
- Edithburgh on the east coast of the hundred

- Coordinates: 35°04′02″S 137°38′49″E
- Country: Australia
- State: South Australia
- Established: 18 February 1869

Area
  - Total: 317 km^{2} (122.5 sq mi)
- County: Fergusson
Lands administrative divisions around Melville
Moorowie	Dalrymple	Gulf St Vincent
Moorowie	Melville	Gulf St Vincent
Gulf St Vincent	Gulf St Vincent	Gulf St Vincent

The Hundred of Melville is a cadastral unit of hundred in South Australia on the southern Yorke Peninsula. It is one of the 16 hundreds of the County of Fergusson. Proclaimed on 18 February June 1869, it was named after Lord Melville, First Lord of the Admiralty (chief of the Royal Navy) in the 1810s and 1820s.

The localities of Coobowie, Edithburgh, Honiton, Sultana Point and parts of Port Moorowie, Wool Bay and Yorketown are within the hundred boundaries.

== Local government ==
The first local government body within the hundred was the District Council of Melville, formed in 1875 and comprising the Hundred of Melville and part of the Hundred of Moorowie. The Corporate Town of Yorketown, at the north of the hundred, seceded from Melville in 1879. Then, in 1882, the Corporate Town of Edithburgh in the east of the hundred also seceded from Melville.

In 1932 Melville council was abolished and the south-west portion in the Hundred of Melville was combined with the District Council of Dalrymple and the Corporate Town of Yorketown to form the new District Council of Yorketown. The Town of Edithburgh was annexed by Yorketown council circa 1980, bringing the hundred back under local governance of a single body for the first time since 1879. In 1997 Yorketown council amalgamated with councils to the west and north to form the much larger Yorke Peninsula Council.

== See also ==
- Lands administrative divisions of South Australia
