= Yorke Highway =

Road in South Australia

Yorke Highway South Australia
- Coordinates: 34.116151°S 138.126415°E (Northeast end); 35.267842°S 136.941471°E (Southwest end)

General information
- Type: Highway
- Length: 180 km (112 mi)
- Route number(s): B86 (1998–present)

Major junctions
- Northeast end: Copper Coast Highway; Port Arthur, South Australia
- St Vincent Highway; Spencer Highway
- Southwest end: Pondalowie Bay Road; Stenhouse Bay, South Australia

Location(s)
- Region: Yorke and Mid North
- Major settlements: Ardrossan, Minlaton, Warooka, Marion Bay

Highway system
- Highways in Australia; National Highway • Freeways in Australia; Highways in South Australia

Yorke Highway is the main road from Adelaide to the southern parts of the Yorke Peninsula in South Australia. It runs from the northeast to the southwest of the peninsula. It branches off Copper Coast Highway after rounding the top of Gulf St Vincent, runs down the coast to Ardrossan then inland through Maitland to the Spencer Gulf coast at Hardwicke Bay then through Warooka to the south coast at Marion Bay and Stenhouse Bay on Investigator Strait.

The state government proposes to restructure the intersection at the north end of the Yorke Highway to provide a large roundabout instead of it being the terminating road at a tee-junction. The roundabout will permit road trains to operate between Port Wakefield and Ardrossan which had previously not been permitted due to limitations of that intersection. Subsidiary works will improve the Yorke Highway north of Ardrossan with a widened bridge, sealed shoulders and overtaking lanes. Road trains up to 36.5 metres (120 ft) were previously permitted to operate on the Augusta Highway through Port Wakefield north towards Port Pirie and beyond, and from Ardrossan south to Port Giles, but were not permitted to operate north of Ardrossan to the Augusta Highway, limiting the capacity to transport grain or minerals.

Rex Minerals propose to realign the Yorke Highway and move the intersection with the St Vincent Highway closer to Pine Point as part of the construction of the Hillside mine. What is now the northern end of the St Vincent Highway would move to a new alignment closer to the coast, with the Yorke Highway turning inland at the southern (Pine Point Road) end of this diversion instead of near the northern end.

== Major junctions ==
LGA	Location	km	mi	Destinations	Notes
Wakefield–Yorke Peninsula boundary	Port Arthur	0	0.0	Copper Coast Highway (B85) – Port Wakefield	Northeastern terminus of highway and route B86
Yorke Peninsula	Ardrossan	42	26	Maitland Road – Maitland	
Yorke Peninsula	Pine Point	55	34	St Vincent Highway (B88) – Port Vincent, Edithburgh	
Yorke Peninsula	Minlaton	93	58	Spencer Highway (B89) – Maitland	
Yorke Peninsula	Warooka	125	78	St Vincent Highway (B88) – Yorketown, Edithburgh	
Yorke Peninsula	Stenhouse Bay	180	110	Innes National Park	Southwestern terminus of highway and route B86
Route transition
