= Jamie Tape =

Australian rules footballer

Personal information
- Born: 15 April 1974; Coobowie, South Australia
- Died: 3 January 2003 (aged 28); Adelaide, South Australia
- Original team: Woodville-West Torrens (SANFL)
- Debut: Round 1, 26 March 1994, Richmond vs. Footscray, at Western Oval
- Height: 188 cm (6 ft 2 in)
- Weight: 89 kg (196 lb)
- Position: Half-back flanker

Playing career^{1}
Years	Club	Games (Goals)
1994–1997	Richmond	75 (4)
1998–1999	Collingwood	16 (1)
Total		91 (5) (AFL)
- ^{1} Playing statistics correct to the end of 1999.

Career highlights
- Yorke Peninsula Football League Mail Medal winner; Woodville-West Torrens Premiership team 1993; Richmond Best First Year Player 1994; AFL Rising Star Nominee 1994; South Australia Representative; Woodville-West Torrens Team of the Decade Half-Back Flank

Jamie Tape (15 April 1974 – 3 January 2003) was an Australian rules footballer who played for the Richmond Football Club and Collingwood Football Club in the Australian Football League (AFL). He also played for the Woodville-West Torrens Football Club in the South Australian National Football League (SANFL).

Jamie grew up in the small South Australian town of Coobowie on the Yorke Peninsula in South Australia. He attended Yorketown Area school in the neighbouring town of Yorketown and played his junior football for the Edithburgh Football Club.

== Football career ==
Jamie was a talented junior and was rewarded for his efforts by winning the Mail Medal for league best and fairest on the Yorke Peninsula. He was invited to play for the WWTFC in the SANFL and after making his league debut in 1992, he played a total of 75 games. He was a part of the 1993 SANFL premiership team and was named in the best players for the day.

Tape moved to AFL club Richmond in 1994 after initially being selected with pick #28 in the 1992 AFL draft. Tape enjoyed a highly-promising first three seasons with the Tigers, wearing number five and playing in 67 out of a possible 69 games and rewarded with an AFL Rising Star nomination in 1994. He shared Richmond's best first year player award with fellow South Australian rookie Matthew Rogers, as well as State of Origin representation. However, Tape began struggling with injury in following years, so much so that he managed just eight more games for Richmond before being traded to Collingwood with teammate Brad Smith in exchange for the Magpies' Aaron James and pick #71 in the 1997 AFL draft.

Tape's AFL career ended in 1999 after he could only manage to play a total of 16 games with Collingwood in his two years spent there. He played his last AFL game at just 25 years old. Following his delisting, he moved back to South Australia and played two more seasons with his original SANFL club Woodville-West Torrens and added another 19 games to his league tally.

== Death and legacy ==
After having only just overcome a 10-month battle with Hodgkin's lymphoma, Tape died soon after a suspected brain aneurysm while at the wheel of his car having gone shopping for supplies for a barbecue, not far from his home on the evening of 3 January 2003. On 9 January, his family and friends gathered in Yorketown, South Australia, to pay their tributes.

His legacy is honoured at the Woodville-West Torrens Football Club, with the club awarding the 'Jamie Tape Medal' for "sacrificial acts" at each year's club awards night.

== Playing statistics ==
Season	Team	No.	Games	Totals							Averages (per game)						
Season	Team	No.	Games	G	B	K	H	D	M	T	G	B	K	H	D	M	T
1994	Richmond	5	21	1	0	179	111	290	68	24	0.05	0	8.5	5.3	13.8	3.2	1.1
1995	Richmond	5	25	2	1	225	93	318	88	34	0.08	0.04	9	3.72	12.72	3.5	1.4
1996	Richmond	5	21	1	3	166	95	261	72	48	0.05	0.14	7.9	4.5	12.43	3.4	2.3
1997	Richmond	5	8	0	0	58	49	107	31	16	0	0	7.25	6.1	13.38	3.9	2
1998	Collingwood	13	7	1	2	53	39	92	29	7	0.14	0.29	7.6	5.57	13.14	4.14	1
1999	Collingwood	13	9	0	1	61	28	89	31	7	0	0.1	6.8	3.1	9.9	3.4	0.8
Career			91	5	7	742	415	1157	319	136	0.05	0.08	8.15	4.56	12.71	3.51	1.49
