= Hillside mine =

- Location within Australia Location within South Australia Location within Yorke Peninsula Council
- Location: South Australia, Australia; 34°32′S 137°52′E
- Products: Copper, Gold, Iron ore
- Company: Rex Minerals

The Hillside mine is a proposed mine located in southern Australia in South Australia. It is being developed by Rex Minerals 12 kilometres (7.5 mi) south of Ardrossan on Yorke Peninsula. It will be near the current intersection of the Yorke Highway and St Vincent Highway. The mine is proposed to focus initially on copper, but it is licensed to produce copper, gold and iron ore.

== Mine approvals and development ==
The mining lease was granted on 16 September 2014 for a term of 21 years. Mining will not start until after the approval of a Program for Environment Protection and Rehabilitation (PEPR) which was required to be submitted before 16 September 2015. In July 2015, Rex requested and received a 12-month extension, revising the due date for submission of the PEPR and Social Management Plan (SMP) to 16 September 2016. This was extended again in August 2016 to make the new deadline 16 September 2017. The Social Management Plan was submitted to the government in September 2017. A further extension was sought for the PEPR, to 26 February 2018. The 2,500 page PEPR was submitted to the government on 2 February 2018. It proposes a 13-year mine life and Rex stated that it intended to start construction of the mine within 12 months of receiving approval.

Realignment of several roads around the mine commenced in September 2024. Control of the mine development passed to MACH Minerals, a subsidiary of Salim Group on 10 October 2024 following its takeover of Rex Minerals.
