= Klein Point =

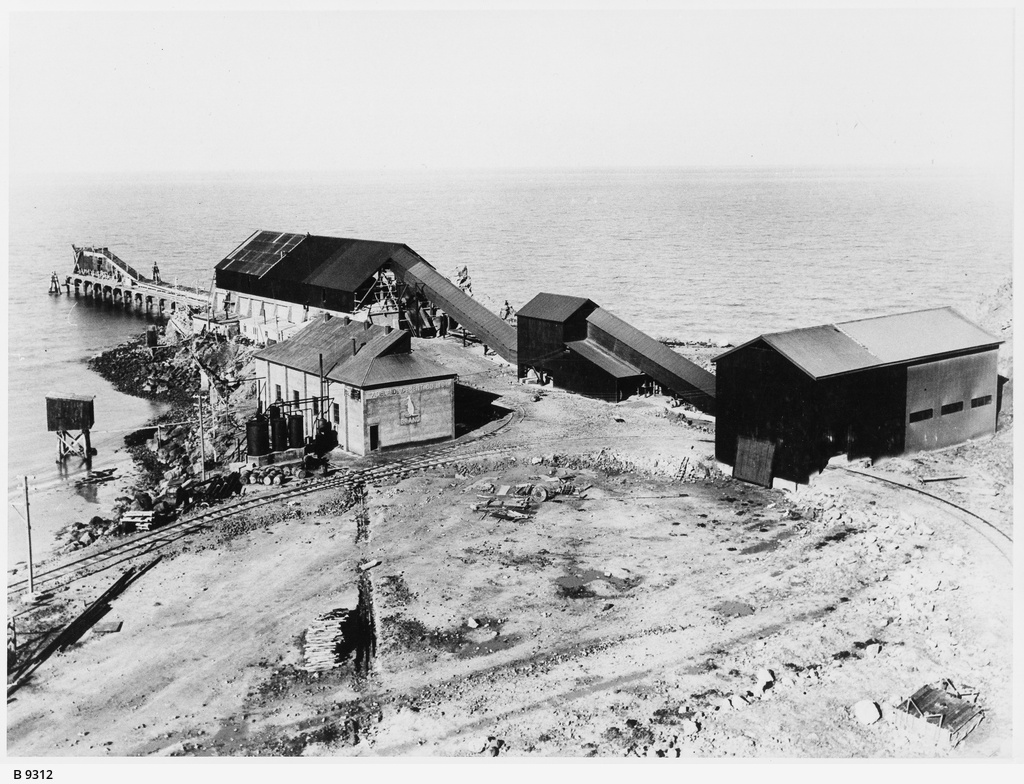
- Klein's Point jetty facilities circa 1940

- Coordinates: 34°57′46″S 137°46′24″E
- Country: Australia
- State: South Australia
- City: Wool Bay

Klein Point is a headland in South Australia located about 7 kilometres (4.3 miles) south of Stansbury in the locality of Wool Bay on Yorke Peninsula. It is the site of a port facility established to handle shipments of limestone for Adbri. The port is managed by Flinders Ports. Prior to 1965 it was known as Farquhar Jetty.

== History ==
The jetty was built in 1920 by the South Australian Harbors Board on a lease back agreement. It was the first reinforced concrete piled jetty in South Australia, measuring 79 metres (259 feet) long with a depth of 3.3 metres (11 feet) at low water. It was widened to 1927, and altered again in 1953. In 1965 a T section was added to improved loading facilities. It now measures 150 metres (490 feet) long with a depth of 6.5 metres (21 feet).

== Beaches ==
Beaches lie on either side of Klein Point, with the mine operations, stockpile, breakwater and jetty located between the two small beaches. The northern beach is 100 m long and hemmed in between the bluffs and the jetty seawall and backed by the mine operations. Both beaches are unsuitable for recreational activities due to access difficulties and the mining operations.

== Limestone ==
About two million tonnes (2,000,000 long tons) of limestone are shipped across Gulf St Vincent each year. Currently Accolade II is used to ship the limestone across the gulf to the Port Adelaide terminal.
