= Flinders Ports =

Company that manages seven of South Australia's ten privately owned ports

Flinders Ports Pty Ltd is a company incorporated in 2001 that manages seven of South Australia's ten ports fronting the Great Australian Bight, Spencer Gulf and Gulf St Vincent. It is the state's largest port operator, employing more than 800 people as of 2016. In 2007, it became part of the Flinders Port Holdings group. It is ISO-certified in safety, environmental and quality management systems. (Note: Respectively ISO 14001: Environmental Management Systems; OHSAS 18001: Occupational Health and Safety Systems; and ISO 9001: Quality Management Systems.)

== Facilities and services ==
In 2001, the company acquired seven ports that were privatised by the South Australian Government and acquired a 99-year land lease and port operating licence for the ports of Port Adelaide, Port Lincoln, Port Pirie, Thevenard, Port Giles, Wallaroo and Klein Point. At Port Adelaide, the main maritime gateway for South Australia, inbound and outbound cargoes include grains and seeds, limestone, petroleum products, motor vehicles, metals and scrap metal, cement and cement clinker, fertilisers, agricultural commodities, iron ore, iron and steel, break-bulk and general cargo, mineral sands, and mineral concentrates.

== Development ==
The expansion of South Australia's mining sector resulted in further development of Flinders Ports infrastructure. In 2009, the company established a dedicated bulk minerals export precinct at Berth 29, Port Adelaide, catering for exports of mineral sands, zinc concentrates, copper concentrates, sulphur and fertilisers/phosphate rock. In 2012, OZ Minerals, owners of the Prominent Hill Mine, and Flinders Logistics developed a more efficient transport system from mine to ship to reduce double handling of copper concentrates, bypass a concentrates shed and traditional loading facilities, and achieve high environmental standards, especially through minimising potential dust emissions. The system involved low-sided containers with fail-safe lockable lids, each loaded with about 30 metric tons (30 long tons) of concentrate at the mine, moved by road and rail to container stacks on Berth 29 to await arrival of the ship. The first time the container is opened is when it is inverted in the hold. Suppression of dust is secured by a mist spray system designed for the specific particle sizes of the concentrate.

== Sponsorship ==
As part of the Flinders Port Holdings' community sponsorship program, Flinders Ports funds a number of sponsorships and provides support for many local sporting clubs, organisations and events in and around its ports. Flinders Ports has sponsored the Environment Award in the Channel 9 Young Achievers Awards since 2011 and sponsors the South Australian Maritime Museum's exhibition program.
