= Honiton, South Australia =

Honiton
- Coordinates: 35.10357528°S 137.64753204°E
- Country: Australia
- State: South Australia
- Region: Yorke and Mid North
- LGA: Yorke Peninsula Council
- Location: 89 km (55 mi) west of Adelaide; 5 km (3.1 mi) west of Edithburgh town centre
- Established: 1999

Government
  - State electorate: Narungga
  - Federal division: Grey

Population
  - Total: 46 (SAL 2021)
- Time zone: UTC+9:30 (ACST)
  - Summer (DST): UTC+10:30 (ACST)
- Postcode: 5576
- County: Fergusson
- Mean max temp: 20.4 °C (68.7 °F)
- Mean min temp: 12.1 °C (53.8 °F)
- Annual rainfall: 372.5 mm (14.67 in)
Localities around Honiton
Yorketown	Yorketown	Coobowie
Port Moorowie	Honiton	Edithburgh
	Investigator Strait
- Distances; Coordinates; Climate; Adjoining localities

Honiton is a locality in the Australian state of South Australia located on the south coast of Yorke Peninsula immediately adjoining Investigator Strait about 89 kilometres (55 miles) west of the state capital of Adelaide and about 5 kilometres (3.1 miles) west of the Edithburgh town centre.

Its boundaries were created in May 1999. The name derives from the former government town of Honiton which was proclaimed on 27 April 1876, which ceased on 26 September 1982 and whose site is within the locality’s extent. The former government town’s name itself is reported as being derived from Honiton, a town located in Devonshire, England.

Honiton’s coastal boundary with Investigator Strait includes coastal features such as Troubridge Hill and Troubridge Point. The area was known as Troubridge in 1871 when the land was first released for farming before the town of Honiton was surveyed in August 1874.

The former government town was located in section 376 in the Hundred of Melville which was sub-divided by the surveyor, James W. Jones in 1874. A school was opened in 1874 under the name "Diamond Lake" which was the informal name used for part of the locality. The school was renamed as “Honiton” in 1891 and was closed in 1942. The locality contains two sites listed on the South Australian Heritage Register - the Lake Fowler Salt Works on Lake Fowler Road and a length of dry stone walling that is located to one side of New Honiton Road, Goldsmith Beach Road and two other roads.

As of 2014, the majority land use within the locality is “primary production."

Honiton is located within the federal division of Grey, the state electoral district of Narungga and the local government area of the Yorke Peninsula Council. The current federal representative is Liberal MP Rowan Ramsey.

== See also ==
- List of cities and towns in South Australia
