= Brad Smith (footballer, born 1977) =

Australian rules footballer

Personal information
- Full name: Bradley J. Smith
- Born: 7 July 1977 (age 49)
- Original team: Claremont
- Draft: 35th, 1995 AFL Draft
- Height: 198 cm (6 ft 6 in)
- Weight: 102 kg (225 lb)

Playing career^{1}
Years	Club	Games (Goals)
1996–1997	Richmond	0 (0)
1998–2000	Collingwood	1 (0)
- ^{1} Playing statistics correct to the end of 2000.

Bradley J. "Brad" Smith (born 7 July 1977) is a former Australian rules footballer who played with Collingwood in the Australian Football League (AFL).

Smith was originally drafted by Richmond, from Claremont, but only played reserves football in his two seasons at the club. Both Smith and his teammate Jamie Tape were traded to Collingwood prior to the 1998 AFL season, in return for Aaron James and the draft selection used on Andrew Kellaway.

A ruckman, he finally made his AFL debut in the 2000 season, when he had four disposals and 14 hit outs in a loss to Geelong at the Melbourne Cricket Ground. He didn't make any further appearances.

In 2010 he joined Western Border Football League club Heywood.
