= Aaron James (Australian footballer) =

Australian rules footballer (born 1976)

Personal information
- Full name: Aaron James
- Born: 31 October 1976 (age 50)
- Original team: Melton / Western Jets
- Draft: 35th, 1993 AFL draft
- Height: 194 cm (6 ft 4 in)
- Weight: 102 kg (225 lb)

Playing career^{1}
Years	Club	Games (Goals)
1994–1997	Collingwood	23 (6)
1998–2000	Richmond	30 (19)
2002	Western Bulldogs	1 (0)
Total		54 (25)
- ^{1} Playing statistics correct to the end of 2002.

Aaron James (born 31 October 1976) is an Australian rules footballer who played with Collingwood, Richmond and the Western Bulldogs in the Australian Football League (AFL).

Having performed well in the TAC Cup, Collingwood selected James with pick 35 in the 1993 AFL draft. He was just 17 when he made his AFL debut in 1994, against Hawthorn, but his only statistic from the game was a free kick against. After making just one further appearance that year, James became a regular member of the team in 1995 with 16 games for the season. A knee injury kept him out of the side for the entirety of 1996 but still made headlines when he was charged with affray following a brawl with nightclub security. He did not return until midway through the 1997 season and at the end of the year was again in trouble, this time for urinating on two women at the "Saloon Bar" in South Yarra. Fined for both incidents, Collingwood lost patience with him and he was traded to Richmond. The trade saw Brad Smith and Jamie Tape go to Collingwood, while Richmond received James as well as the draft pick which was used to get Andrew Kellaway.

James spent four seasons at Richmond, playing seven games in 1998 and ten more in 1999. He was a regular fixture in the side for the second half of the 2000 AFL season but another knee injury, suffered during the final round match against Carlton, would mean he missed another year of football, in 2001.

He nominated for the 2001 AFL draft and was secured by the Western Bulldogs with the 83rd and final pick of the draft. His appearance for the Bulldogs in the opening round of the 2002 season, at Docklands, was to be his last AFL game and he scored a behind with his only possession.

Before the end of the season, James left the Bulldogs and finished the year in the Bendigo Football League. He was a member of Gisborne's 2002 premiership team and in 2003 kicked over 100 goals playing at full-forward for the Doutta Stars of the EDFL.

In 2004 he played with Lalor in the Diamond Valley Football League and was again prolific as a forward, kicking 114 goals to top the league's charts.

He was at Albion in 2005 and kicked over 100 goals for the third successive season of regional football.

Continuing the pattern of one season club stints, James was with RDFL club the Sunbury Kangaroos in 2006. During the finals series that year he was reported for threatening behavior towards an umpire and suspended for 15 weeks. This kept him out of action for much of 2007 but the following year he played some good football at Stanhope.

He kicked 130 goals in the 2009 HDFL season with North Bendigo and had another prolific year up forward in 2010 at Kilmore.
