= Adbri =

Australian manufacturer of cement, lime and dry blended products

- Industry: Construction
- Founded: 1882; 144 years ago
- Headquarters: Adelaide, South Australia
- Area served: Australia
- Revenue: $1.5 billion (2020)
- Operating income: $148 million (2020)
- Net income: $95 million (2020)
- Website: www.adbri.com.au

Adbri, formerly Adelaide Brighton Cement, is an Australian manufacturer of cement, lime and dry blended products.

== Overview ==
Adbri operates manufacturing and distribution facilities in South Australia, Queensland, Tasmania, Victoria the Northern Territory, Western Australia and New South Wales. Associated brands and companies include Adbri Cement, Adbri Concrete, Adbri Ash, Adbri Masonry, Central Pre-mix, Hy-Tec Concrete, Metro Quarry Sands Batesford Quarry, Cockburn Cement, Sunstate Cement, Independent Cement & Lime, Premix Concrete SA, Eureka Concrete, Swan Materials, Seelander Quarries, Mawsons Concrete and Quarries.

The company delisted from the Australian Securities Exchange in 2024 following CRH becoming a majority shareholder in the company.

The CEO of Adbri is Paul Headd.

== Mining and processing facilities ==
- Angaston plant
- Birkenhead plant
- Klein Point, limestone quarry
- Rapid Bay limestone quarry

== History ==
William Lewis, a Welsh immigrant, established lime kilns in 1880 on an allotment near the corner of Brighton and Shoreham Roads, Adelaide, South Australia. Several kilometres south, what is now Marino to Reynella and Hallett Cove, were rich limestone deposits. The rocks formed part of the great Precambrian limestone formations known geologically as the Brighton Series.

Two years later, Lewis built a larger kiln, closer to the limestone deposits, fifteen feet square and twenty feet high. So began the Brighton Cement Works, which were officially opened on 12 December 1882. There was a bright future for the production of local cement, as at that time, South Australia was importing 8,000 tons of portland cement a year.

But the promising start soon faded, with Lewis closing the works in 1883 due to poor sales, attributed to the local product being too expensive and not as good quality as the imported cement.

However, other colonists took up the challenge. Brompton brickmaker, William Shearing became involved. Some years later, a syndicate including John Howard Angas and Simpson Newland bought the Works. In 1896, quality of the local cement appeared solid, with the product being used in the construction of the Happy Valley Reservoir. By 1900 the company had 813 acres (3.29 km^{2}) and were selling over 3,500 tons a year. A major setback occurred on 7 November 1909, when the works were consumed by fire.

Carting rock and coal was a significant task, with horse and dray being a familiar sight. In 1913, the company owned 74 horses. Stablehands began at 4 am with grooming and feeding. Drivers were ready at 6:45 am for the 11 1/2 hour trip from the Works to the city carrying cement, returning via Bromptom, where coke was loaded. Horse-drawn trolleys were also used to cart additional stone from the Reynella quarries to the Reynella railway station, to be freighted to the Marino site by rail. Eventually the Reynella horses were replaced by the Flying Fox. This labour-saving aerial ropeway became somewhat of a tourist attraction.

The Brighton Cement works moved to Angaston in the 1950s. Brighton Cement merged with Adelaide Cement Company to become Adelaide Brighton Cement in the 1970s.

== General references ==
- Penn, David William (1977). How firm the foundation: a historical survey of an independent venture that founded the Portland cement industry in Australia. North Sydney: Concrete. ISBN 9780909942298. OCLC 27608883.
- Dolling, Alison (1981). The history of Marion on the Sturt: the story of a changing landscape and its people. Frewville: Peacock Publications. ISBN 9780909209483. OCLC 27574303.
