= Port Giles, South Australia =

Port Giles Coobowie, South Australia
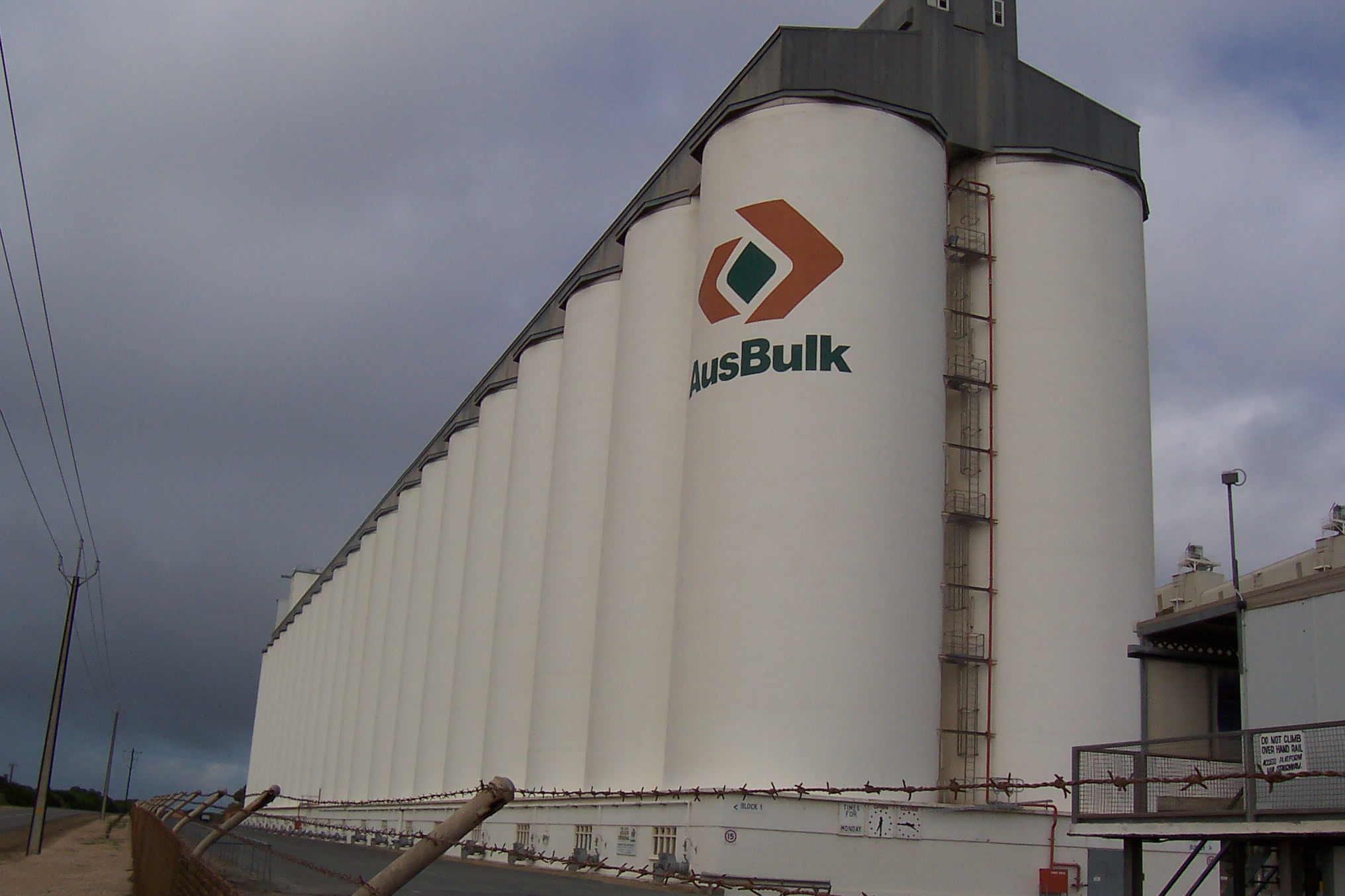
- Grain silos at Port Giles

- Coordinates: 35°01′23″S 137°45′34″E
- Established: 28 May 1970
- Location: 3 km (2 mi) south of Town of Wool Bay

Port Giles is a port on Yorke Peninsula in the Australian state of South Australia located in the gazetted locality of Coobowie between the towns of Stansbury and Edithburgh.

Port Giles a port facility consisting of a large jetty equipped for bulk handling of grain which is operated by Flinders Ports, and a similarly large grain storage facility operated by Viterra. It was opened by the then Premier of South Australia, Steele Hall in 1970, and led to the closure of many of the smaller ports on the peninsula. Port Giles can handle Panamax size ships or larger.

Port Giles was purposely built to be able to handle bulk grain, and load it onto larger modern ships. Many of the other ports were not deep enough for larger ships, and could only be serviced by small ketches and coastal steamships. They only handled grain in bags, not in bulk.

The port is occasionally open for keen anglers to catch fish from the jetty, which provides habitat for multiple species.

== See also ==
- List of ports in Australia
