= Port Moorowie, South Australia =

Port Moorowie
- Town
- Coordinates: 35°6′45″S 137°31′10″E
- Country: Australia
- State: South Australia
- LGA: Yorke Peninsula Council

Government
  - State electorate: Narungga
  - Federal division: Grey
- Elevation: 5 m (16 ft)

Population
  - Total: 93 (SAL 2021)
- Postcode: 5576
Localities around Port Moorowie
Warooka	Yorketown	Yorketown
Warooka	Port Moorowie	Honiton
Investigator Strait	Investigator Strait	Investigator Strait

Port Moorowie is a small town in the Australian state of South Australia on the south coast of Yorke Peninsula. It has relatively calm beaches and a boat ramp on McLeod Harbour at the western end of Waterloo Bay in Investigator Strait. The town is predominantly a collection of holiday houses and shacks.

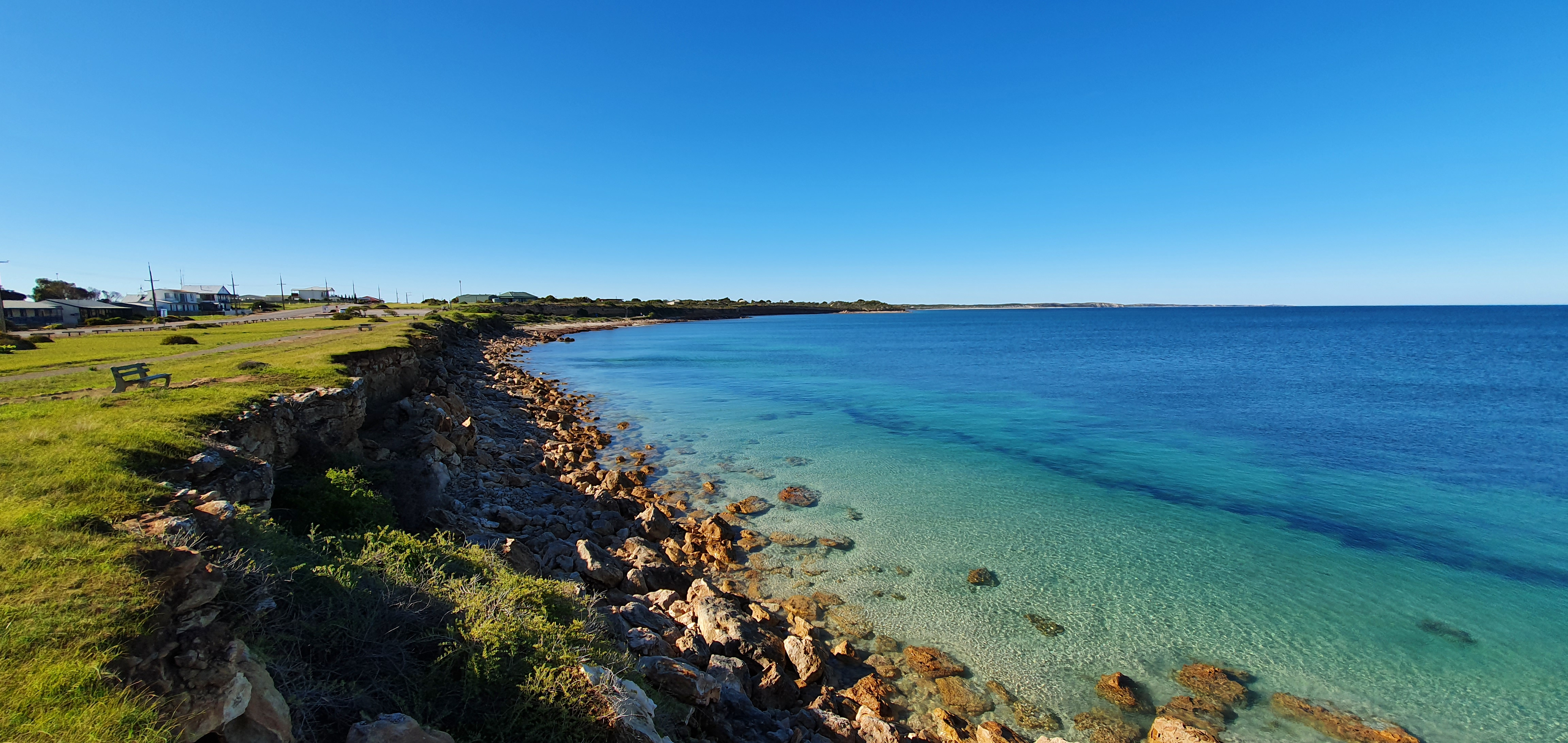
The cliff face looking towards the boat ramp and Troubridge Lighthouse
