= Wool Bay, South Australia =

Wool Bay
- Town
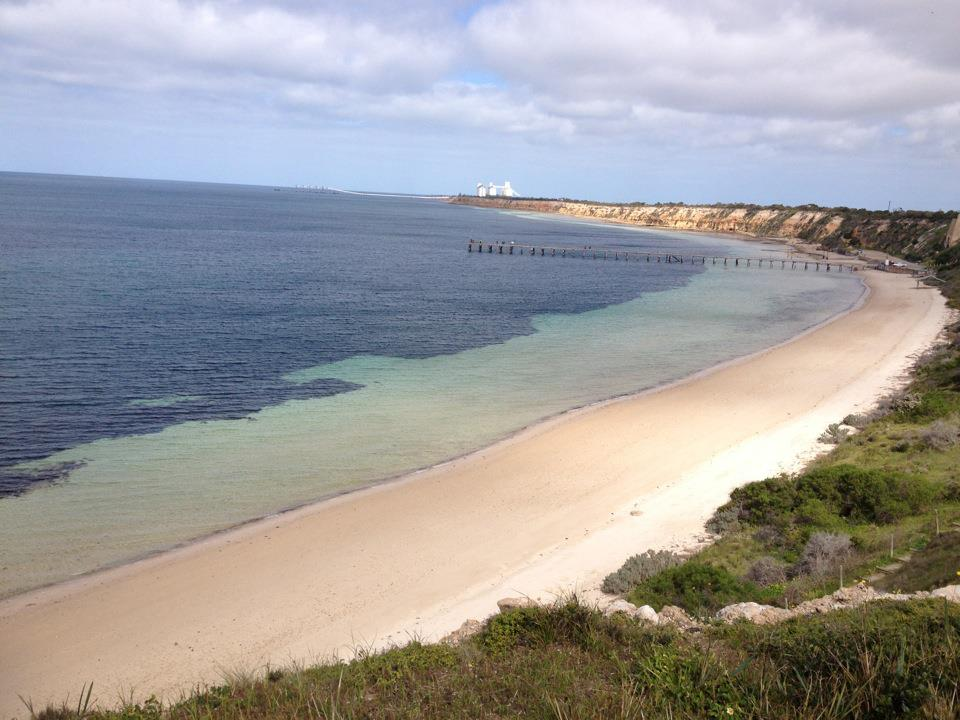
- View of Wool Bay and jetty from the cliff top

- Coordinates: 34°59′35″S 137°45′15″E
- Country: Australia
- State: South Australia
- Region: Yorke and Mid North
- LGA: Yorke Peninsula Council
- Location: 215 km (134 mi) from Adelaide; 70 km (43 mi) west of Adelaide; 3 km (1.9 mi) north of Port Giles
- Established: 24 August 1876 (town); 27 May 1999 (locality)

Government
  - State electorate: Narungga
  - Federal division: Grey

Population
  - Total: 154 (SAL 2021)
- Time zone: UTC+9:30 (ACST)
  - Summer (DST): UTC+10:30 (ACST)
- Postcode: 5575
- County: Fergusson
- Mean max temp: 20.5 °C (68.9 °F)
- Mean min temp: 12.1 °C (53.8 °F)
- Annual rainfall: 377.6 mm (14.87 in)
Localities around Wool Bay
Yorketown	Stansbury
Yorketown	Wool Bay	Gulf St Vincent
Yorketown	Coobowie

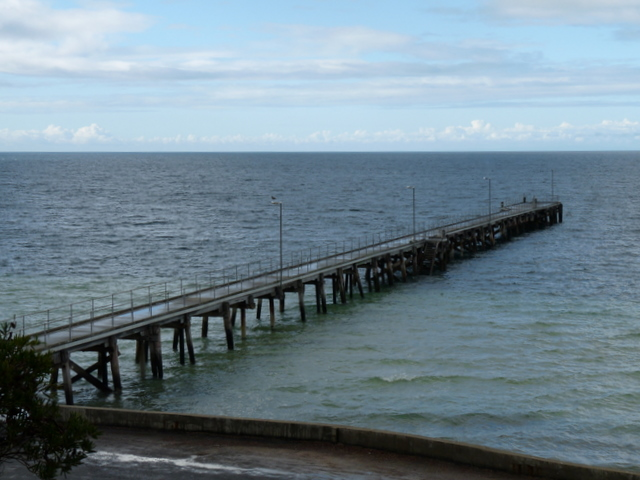
Wool Bay Jetty, Wool Bay

Wool Bay (formerly Pickering) is a locality and a former government town in the Australian state of South Australia on the east coast of southern Yorke Peninsula. It is located between Stansbury and Coobowie on Yorke Peninsula, approximately 220 kilometres from Adelaide by road, but only just over 60 km due west across Gulf St Vincent.

== Description ==
The beach of Wool Bay features a permanently moored pontoon which is maintained by the local progress association, several sun shelters and a concrete boat ramp. A number of marine animals inhabit the waters of Wool Bay; dolphins and sting rays can frequently be seen close to shore, and fur seals often feed off the rocky outcrop between the second and third coves past the main bay in the early evening.

== History ==
The town was originally called Pickering when it was established on 24 August 1876. It is on cliffs overlooking a protected bay. In 1882 a jetty was built, initially to roll wool bales out to the ships. The locals named the jetty as Wool Bay jetty and by 1940, the name of the town had also changed to Wool Bay. For many years, the town functioned as a wool, grain and lime exporting port.

=== History of lime burning at Wool Bay ===
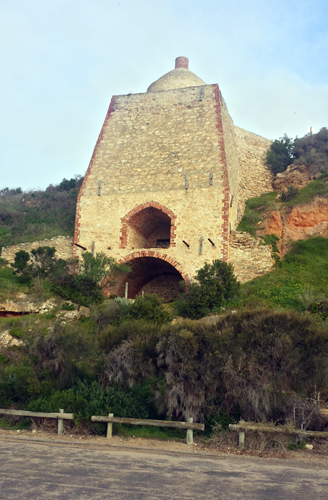
Wool Bay lime kiln

Between 1900 and 1910, six lime kilns were built on the cliffs overlooking the bay. Lime was burnt to create quicklime, an ingredient in mortar and brick-making. The kilns were one of the largest and most modern facilities in the state when they were established by David Miller & Sons, and opened in 1910. The Wool Bay lime kilns closed in the 1960s and most of the kilns and associated infrastructure were demolished in the 1970s. One kiln remains and was listed along with the jetty under the name of Wool Bay Lime Kiln & Jetty on the South Australian Heritage Register on 28 November 1985. Limestone is still mined at Klein Point north of the township of Wool Bay, and shipped from a separate jetty to the Adbri facility near Port Adelaide.

== Wool Bay jetty ==
Community lobbying for a jetty commenced in 1879: the people believed that deep water in the bay would provide safer anchorage than other nearby locations. Eventually in 1882 construction of a jetty was undertaken by Frank George. Originally 155 metres long, it provided a depth of 2.1 metres at low tide. When lime burning became an established industry at Wool Bay the jetty was extended by a further 18 metres in anticipation of increased use. During this time, a steamship service dropped off and picked up provisions three times a week. When bulk-handling of grain was introduced at Port Giles in 1970, Wool Bay's importance as a port declined.

Today, the jetty at Wool Bay is popular with anglers. It is known for producing good catches of squid and tommy ruff throughout the year while garfish, mullet, snook and other species can be caught in season. The jetty is also used by recreational scuba divers, drawn by the population of leafy seadragon that inhabit the waters beneath the jetty.

== Governance ==
Wool Bay is located in the federal Division of Grey, the state electoral district of Narungga and the local government area of Yorke Peninsula Council.

== See also ==
- List of cities and towns in South Australia
- Klein Point
