= Yorketown, South Australia =

Yorketown South Australia
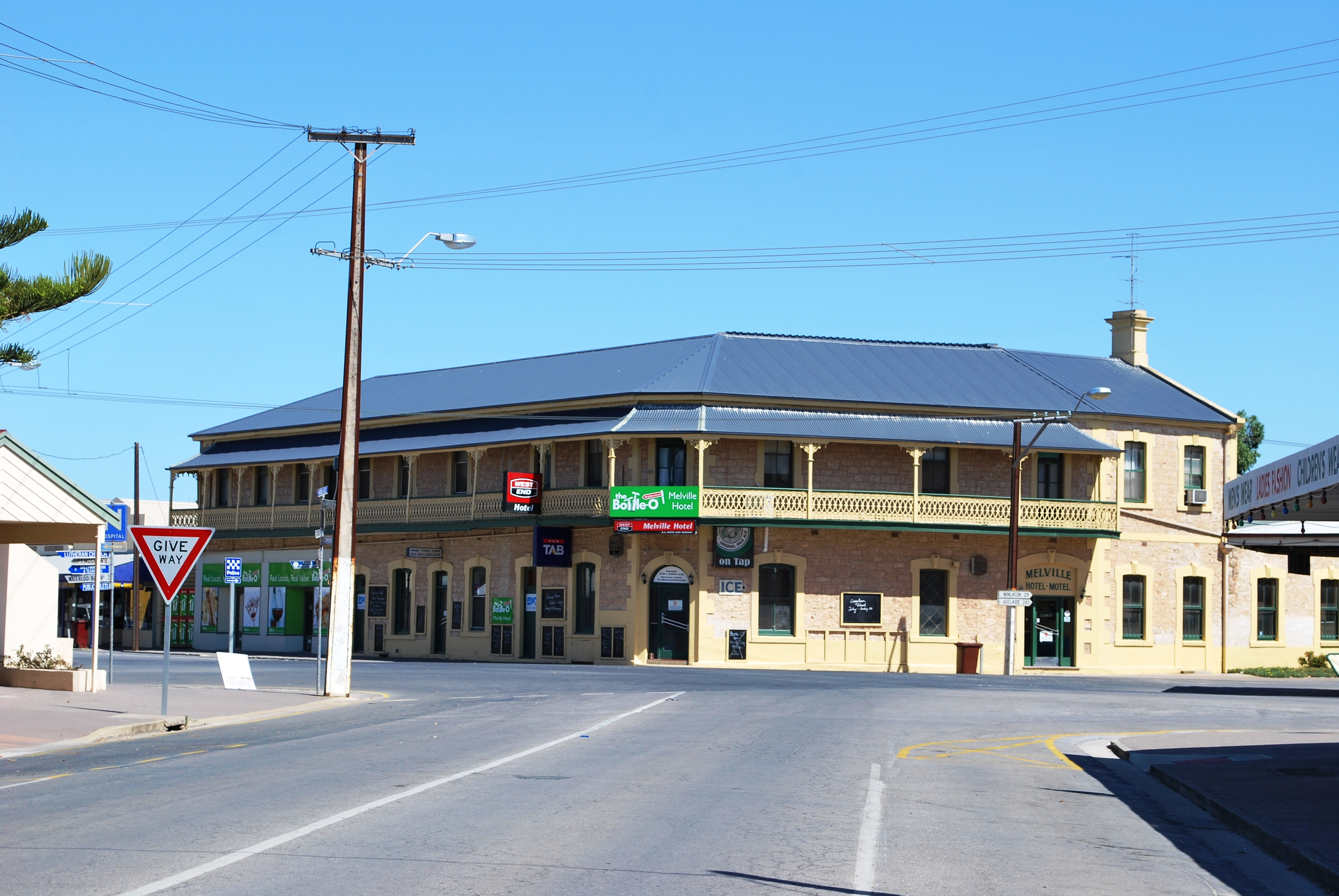
- Meville Hotel, Yorketown

- Coordinates: 35°01′14″S 137°36′10″E
- Population: 667 (UCL 2021)
- Established: 1872 (sub-division); 27 May 1999 (locality)
- Postcode(s): 5576
- Time zone: ACST (UTC+9:30)
  - Summer (DST): ACST (UTC+10:30)
- Location: 91 km (57 mi) W of Adelaide; 227 km (141 mi) from Adelaide via; 70 km (43 mi) S of Maitland
- LGA(s): Yorke Peninsula Council
- Region: Yorke and Mid North
- County: Fergusson
- State electorate(s): Narungga
- Federal division(s): Grey
Mean max temp	Mean min temp	Annual rainfall
20.4 °C; 69 °F	12.1 °C; 54 °F	381.0 mm 15 in
Localities around Yorketown:
Hardwicke Bay	Brentwood; Minlaton; Ramsay	Ramsay
Hardwicke Bay; Warooka	Yorketown	Stansbury; Wool Bay; Coobowie
Port Moorowie	Port Moorowie; Honiton	Edithburgh
- Footnotes: LGA; Adjoining localities

Yorketown is a town and a locality in the Australian state of South Australia located in the southern Yorke Peninsula about 91 kilometres (57 mi) west of the state capital of Adelaide and about 70 kilometres (43 mi) south of the municipal seat of Maitland.

== History ==
Yorketown began as a private sub-division in section 85 of the cadastral unit of the Hundred of Melville in 1872. Its name was declared by the Surveyor General of South Australia as an official place name on 16 November 1995. Boundaries were created for the locality which was given the "long established name" of Yorketown on 27 May 1999. The area associated with Yorketown is known as Garrdinya by the Narungga, the aboriginal people of the Yorke Peninsula.

== Government ==
It is located in the local government area of Yorke Peninsula Council, the state electoral district of Narungga and the federal Division of Grey.

== Education ==
Yorketown Area School accommodates students from Reception to Year 12. First established in 1878 at Weaners Flat (where our town playground is now located), Yorketown Area School has been operating from its current site since 1976. it was merged with Edithburgh State School in 2017.

== Media ==
The Southern Yorke's Peninsula Pioneer was first published in Yorketown on 21 January 1898, and sold at a discounted price due to its late appearance. It was originally owned and established by Ben L. Wilkinson, and later helped by his brother Richard. In Issue 10, on 25 March that year, the newspaper adopted a simpler title, The Pioneer, later becoming part of the Yorke Peninsula Country Times from June 1970.

For thirty years an opposition newspaper, The Southern Yorke's Peninsula Clarion (1 February – 31 May 1902), simplified to the Clarion (7 June 1902 – 21 May 1931), also existed in the town too.
