= Coobowie =

Coobowie South Australia
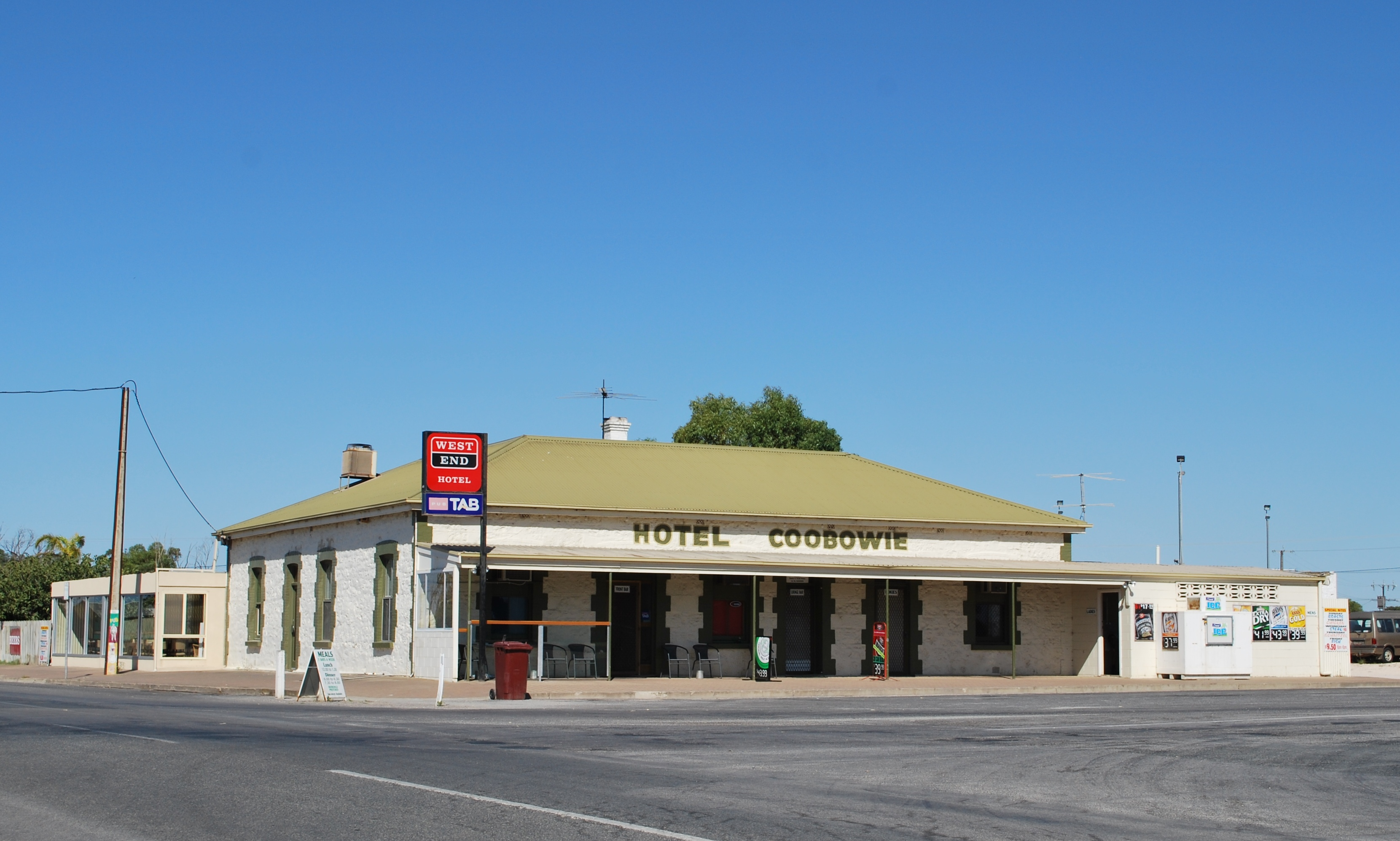
- Hotel Coobowie

- Coordinates: 35.045702°0′S 137.729851°0′E
- Population: 222 (UCL 2021)
- Established: 7 January 1875 (town); 27 May 1999 (locality)
- Postcode(s): 5583
- Location: 80 km (50 mi) W of Adelaide; 74 km (46 mi) S of Maitland
- LGA(s): Yorke Peninsula Council
- Region: Yorke and Mid North
- County: Fergusson
- State electorate(s): Narungga
- Federal division(s): Grey
Mean max temp	Mean min temp	Annual rainfall
20.5 °C; 69 °F	12.1 °C; 54 °F	372.5 mm 14.7 in
Localities around Coobowie:
Yorketown	Wool Bay	Gulf St Vincent
Yorketown	Coobowie	Gulf St Vincent
Honiton	Edithburgh	Gulf St Vincent
- Footnotes: Locations; Adjoining localities

Coobowie is a town in the Australian state of South Australia near the south-eastern tip of Yorke Peninsula. Coobowie was proclaimed in 1875. Coobowie comes from an Aboriginal word meaning "wild fowl water". At the 2011 census, Coobowie shared a population of 220 with other localities. Coobowie's current outlook is to create many new features including making improvements to the foreshore play area.

The protected area known as the Coobowie Aquatic Reserve is partly located within Coobowie with the remainder being located in the adjoining bay, Salt Creek Bay.

== See also ==
- List of cities and towns in South Australia
- Port Giles, South Australia
