= Edithburgh =

Coastal town in South Australia

- Town
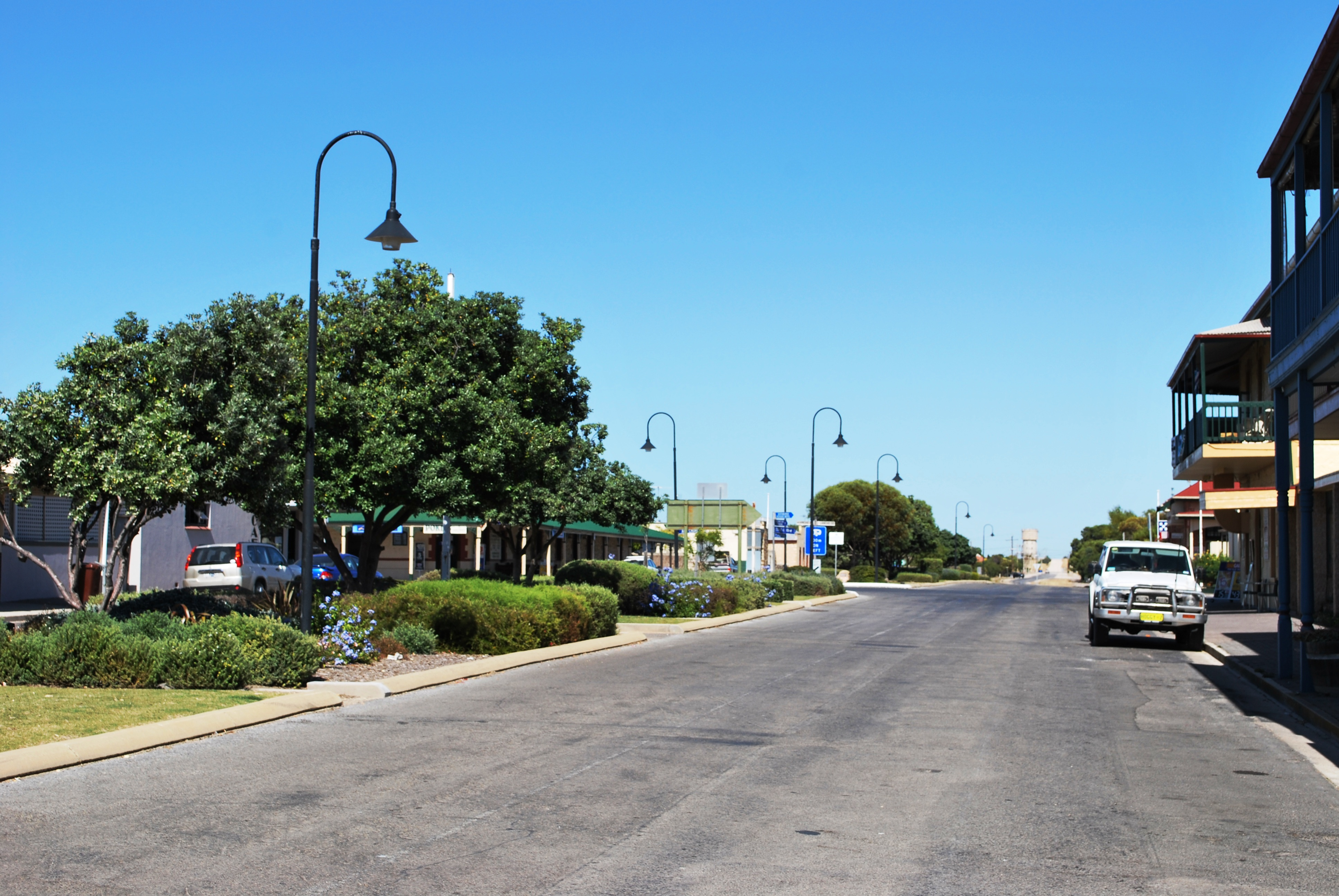
- Edith Street

- Coordinates: 35°05′0″S 137°44′0″E
- Country: Australia
- State: South Australia
- Region: Yorke and Mid North
- LGA: Yorke Peninsula Council
- Location: 226 km (140 mi) W of Adelaide; 141 km (88 mi) S of Kadina; 45 km (28 mi) SE of Minlaton
- Established: 1869

Government
  - State electorate: Narungga
  - Federal division: Grey

Population
  - Total: 497 (UCL 2021)
- Postcode: 5583
- County: Fergusson
- Mean max temp: 20.5 °C (68.9 °F)
- Mean min temp: 12.1 °C (53.8 °F)
- Annual rainfall: 377.6 mm (14.87 in)
Localities around Edithburgh
Yorketown	Coobowie	Gulf St Vincent
Yorketown	Edithburgh	Gulf St Vincent
Honiton	Gulf St Vincent	Sultana Point

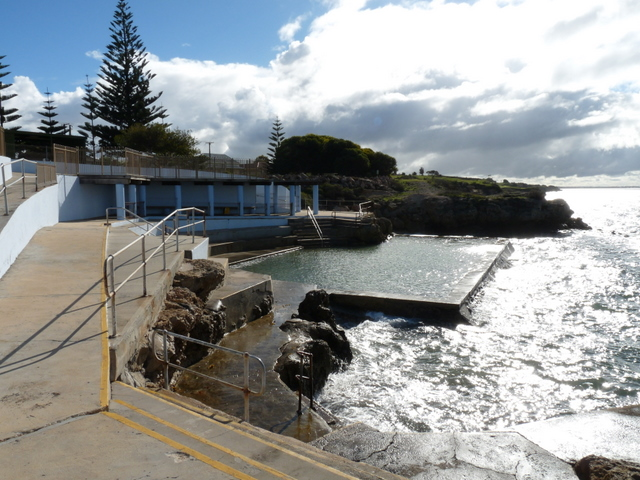
Tidal seawater swimming pool at Edithburgh, South Australia

Edithburgh /ˈiːdɪθbɜːrɡ/ is a small town on the south-east corner of Yorke Peninsula situated on the coastline of Salt Creek Bay, in the state of South Australia. Edithburgh is about 50 km (31 mi) west of Adelaide across Gulf St Vincent, but 226 km (140 mi) away by road.

Edithburgh is in the Yorke Peninsula Council, the South Australian House of Assembly electoral district of Narungga and the Australian House of Representatives Division of Grey.

== History ==
In the Narangga language of the Indigenous Narungga people, Edithburgh was known by the place name Pararmarati. Some sources give the pronunciation "Barram-marrat-tee".

The first European pioneers arrived in the 1840s and were sheep graziers and pastoralists. With closer settlement, in 1869 the Marine Board fixed a site for a jetty to service the developing farming district. An adjacent town was then surveyed, the layout closely emulating (on a smaller scale) that of Adelaide, with a belt of parklands. Edithburgh was named by Governor Sir James Fergusson after his wife Edith, who died in 1871. The new jetty opened in 1873.

=== 2019 November Fires ===
From 20 to 21 November 2019, at least 11 homes were destroyed or damaged by fires burning across the Yorke Peninsula. On 21 November, a stubble fire threatened Edithburgh, Coobowie and Wool Bay as it burnt towards the coast, fanned by strong south-westerly winds. At the height of the emergency, many residents of the area took shelter overnight in the Edithburgh Town Hall. There were no deaths, and it was found to have been caused by a power network fault.

== Industries ==
Edithburgh originally developed as a port for servicing the pastoralist pioneers. In the 1870s grain farming became a mainstay of the local economy, which it still is. At the turn of the 20th Century additional industries were established in the form of gypsum mining and salt refining. There are vast salt lakes in the area, from which salt was scraped and exported as far as Russia. Among those refineries was the Standard Salt Company, operated by C. T. McGlew. The jetty became a busy hub for exporting these commodities, as well as unloading supplies.

Nowadays the jetty is used mostly for recreational fishing and is a popular scuba diving site. There is also a small fishing and prawning fleet based there. The town is now overshadowed by the 55 wind turbines of the Wattle Point Wind Farm, located southwest of the town and opened in April 2005.

== Tourism ==
Occupying a commanding position on the coastline at semi-circular Salt Creek Bay, Edithburgh is noted for its magnificent seascapes which include steep rocky cliffs and sandy beaches. Troubridge Island can be seen offshore. As a result, tourism is now a growth industry. It is a popular holiday destination with a variety of accommodation types available including a caravan park. The Troubridge Hotel and the Edithburgh Hotel sit diagonally opposite each other at the intersection of Blanche and Edith Streets, both named after Governor Fergusson's daughters.

The town has a seawater swimming pool constructed at the shoreline. Its sheltered waters are refreshed with each rising tide.

== Diving and snorkelling ==
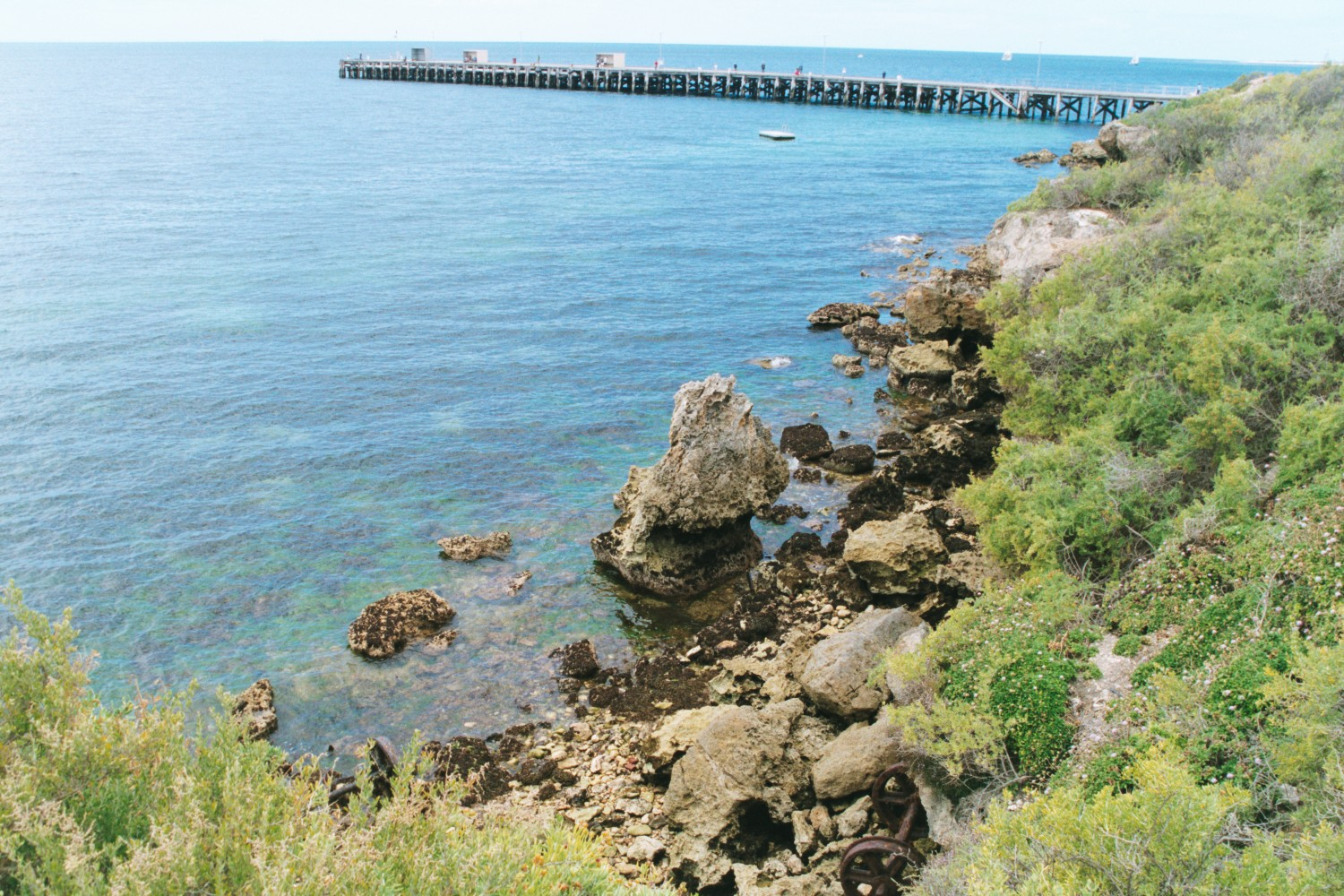
Edithburgh Jetty, Gulf St Vincent, South Australia

Edithburgh jetty is regarded as one of South Australia's best scuba diving sites. Access is easy thanks to steps on northern and southern sides of the structure.

The jetty extends eastwards into Gulf St Vincent and is 170 m in length. The jetty is supported by pylons in groups of four. Divers and snorkellers can safely and closely observe dense, multi-coloured colonies of temperate corals and sponges on the jetty pylons. The pylons also provide refuges for various fish, crustacea, nudibranchs and other marine invertebrates.

Several of the state's iconic marine species can be seen beneath or near the jetty, including the Leafy sea dragon and the Striped pyjama squid.

The maximum dive depth is 10–12 m and site is rewarding for visitors of all experience levels.

Historical population
Year	Pop.	±%
1921	792	—
1933	610	−23.0%
1947	497	−18.5%
1954	477	−4.0%
1961	510	+6.9%
1966	390	−23.5%
1971	319	−18.2%
1976	341	+6.9%
1981	359	+5.3%
1986	446	+24.2%
1991	453	+1.6%
1996	400	−11.7%
2001	433	+8.3%
2006	395	−8.8%
2011	466	+18.0%
2016	454	−2.6%
2021	497	+9.5%
Source: Australian Bureau of Statistics data.

=== Jetty maintenance and habitat loss ===
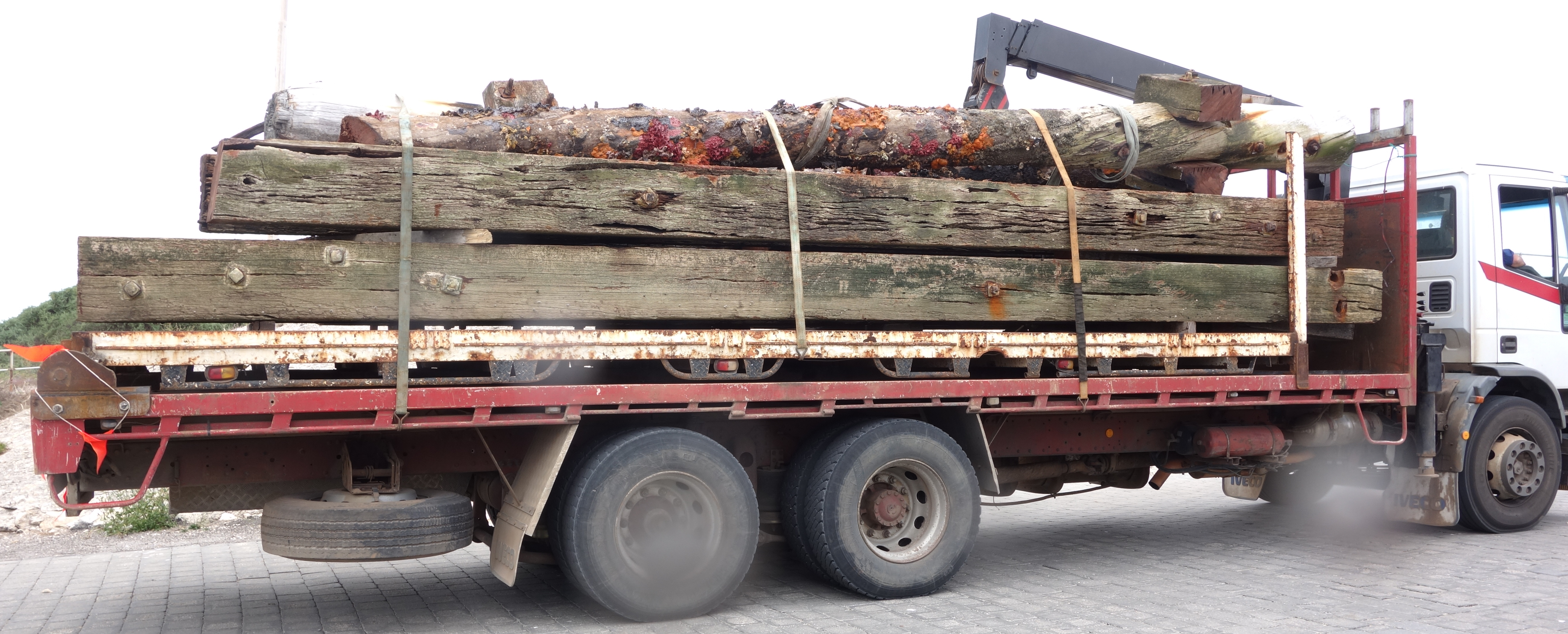
Edithburgh Jetty pylon removal works, 8 December 2013

In December 2013, maintenance works were conducted at the Edithburgh jetty by a contractor working for the local council. An estimated 50 jetty pylons were removed from the periphery of the jetty. They were either sawed off at the seabed, or pulled up from the substrate. This resulted in an immediate loss of habitat and marine life, upsetting many members of the scuba diving and marine conservation community.

Jetty pylons had been assessed some years prior by the State Government's Department of Transport, Energy and Infrastructure (now known as the Department of Planning, Transport and Infrastructure) and identified as a public liability risk. Impacts to the marine environment or the site's iconic status as a dive tourism hotspot do not appear to have been considered by DPTI or the local council.

Recreational divers from M.E. Dive Club witnessed the early works and arranged a group of divers to informally assess the damage the following weekend. The pylon removal works were not publicly advertised nor was the dive or tourism community consulted on the works. The Scuba Divers Federation of South Australia and the Marine Life Society of South Australia both responded to the issue by drafting letters to responsible Government bodies.

=== Gallery ===
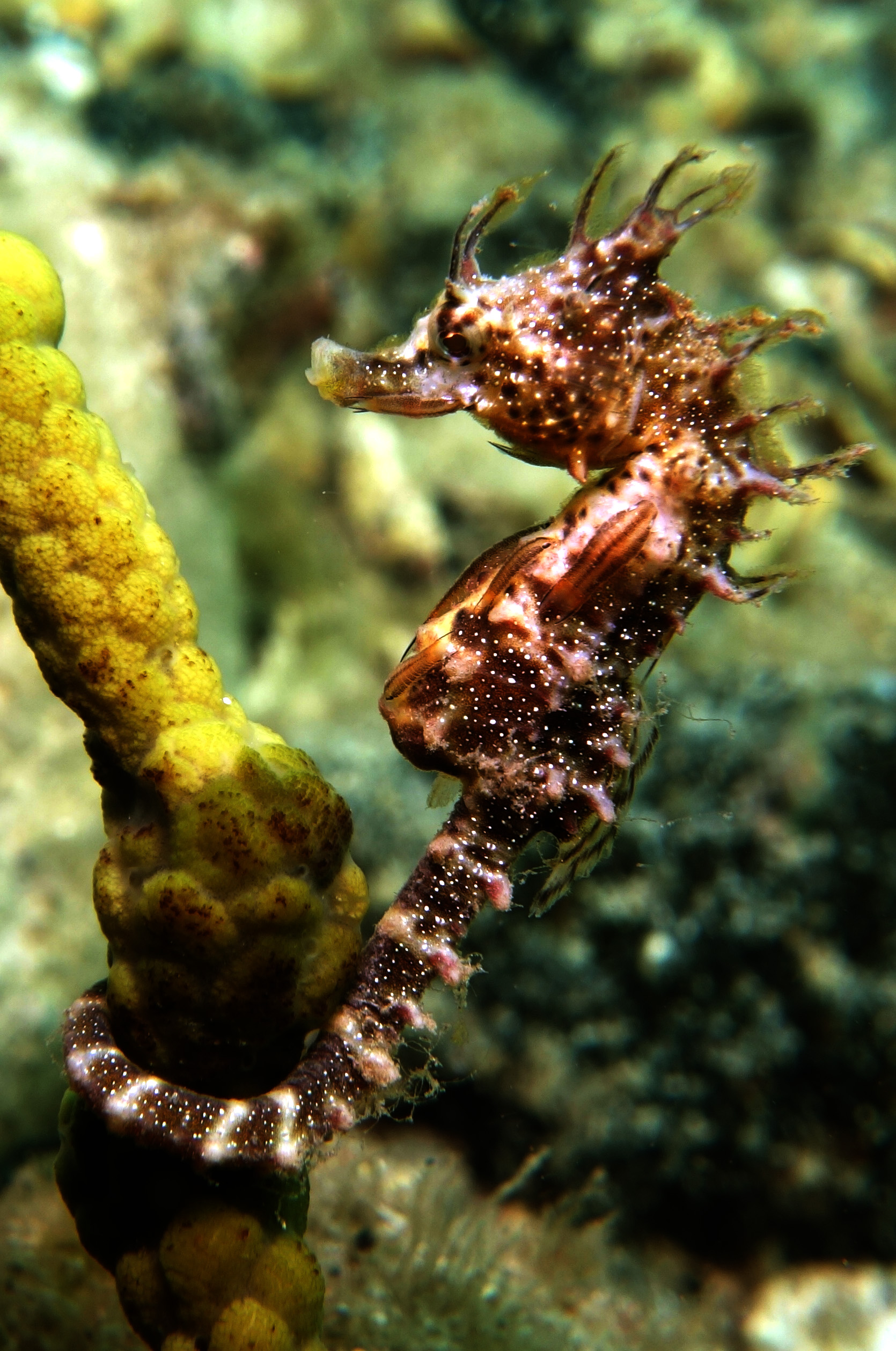
Seahorse beneath Edithburgh Jetty

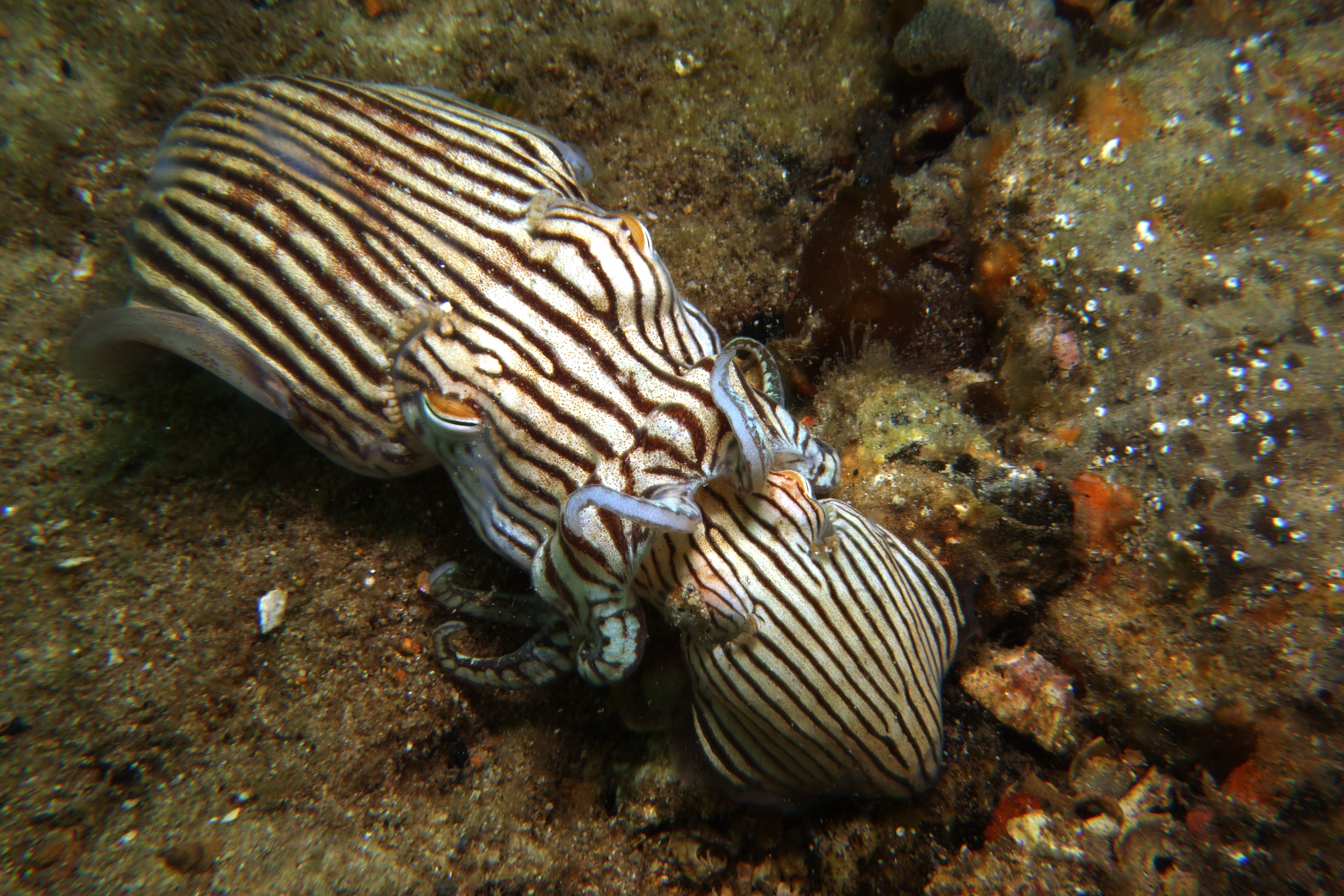
Striped Pyjama squid mating under Edithburgh jetty

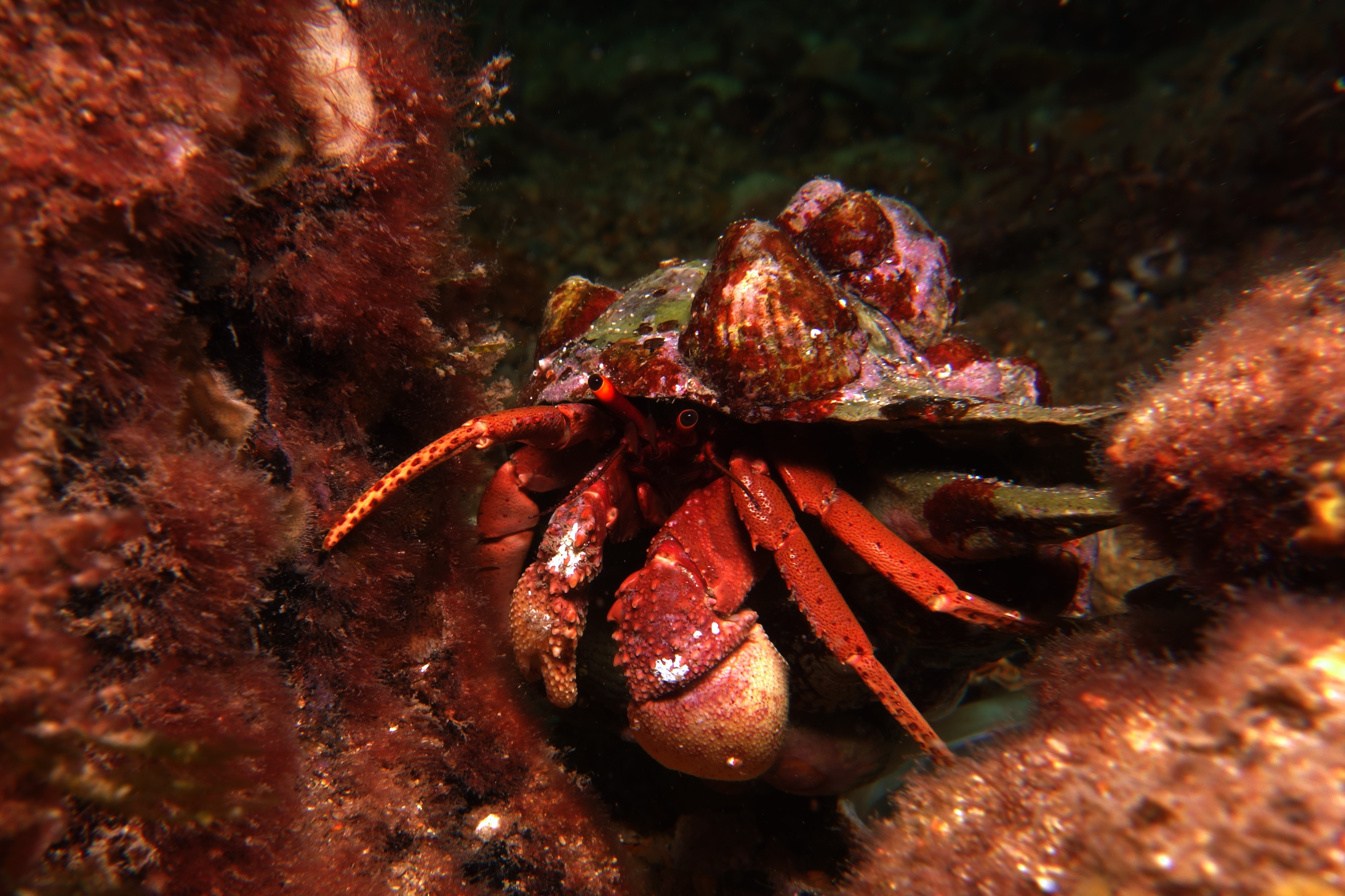
Hermit crab beneath Edithburgh jetty

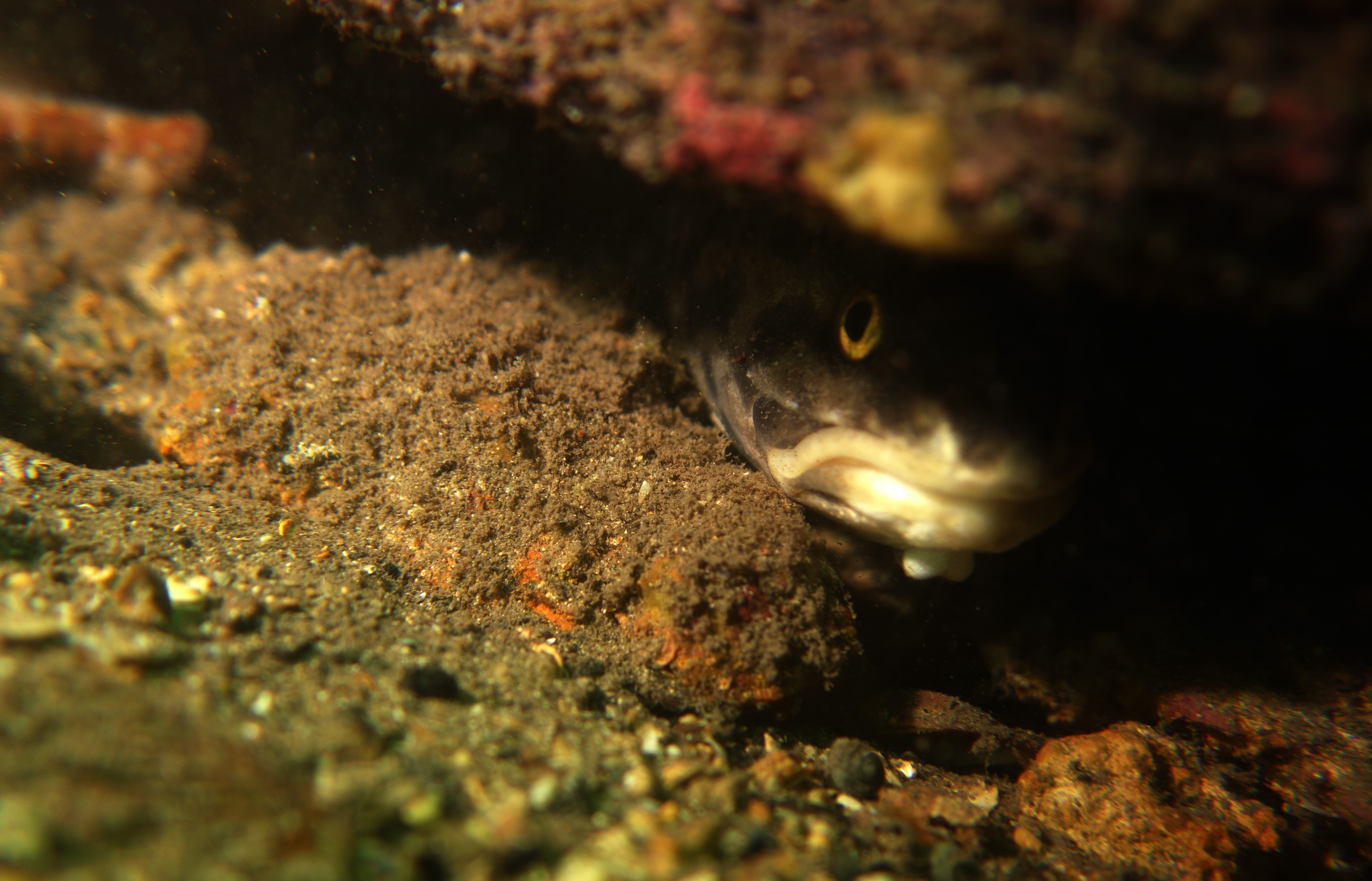
Rock ling beneath Edithburgh jetty

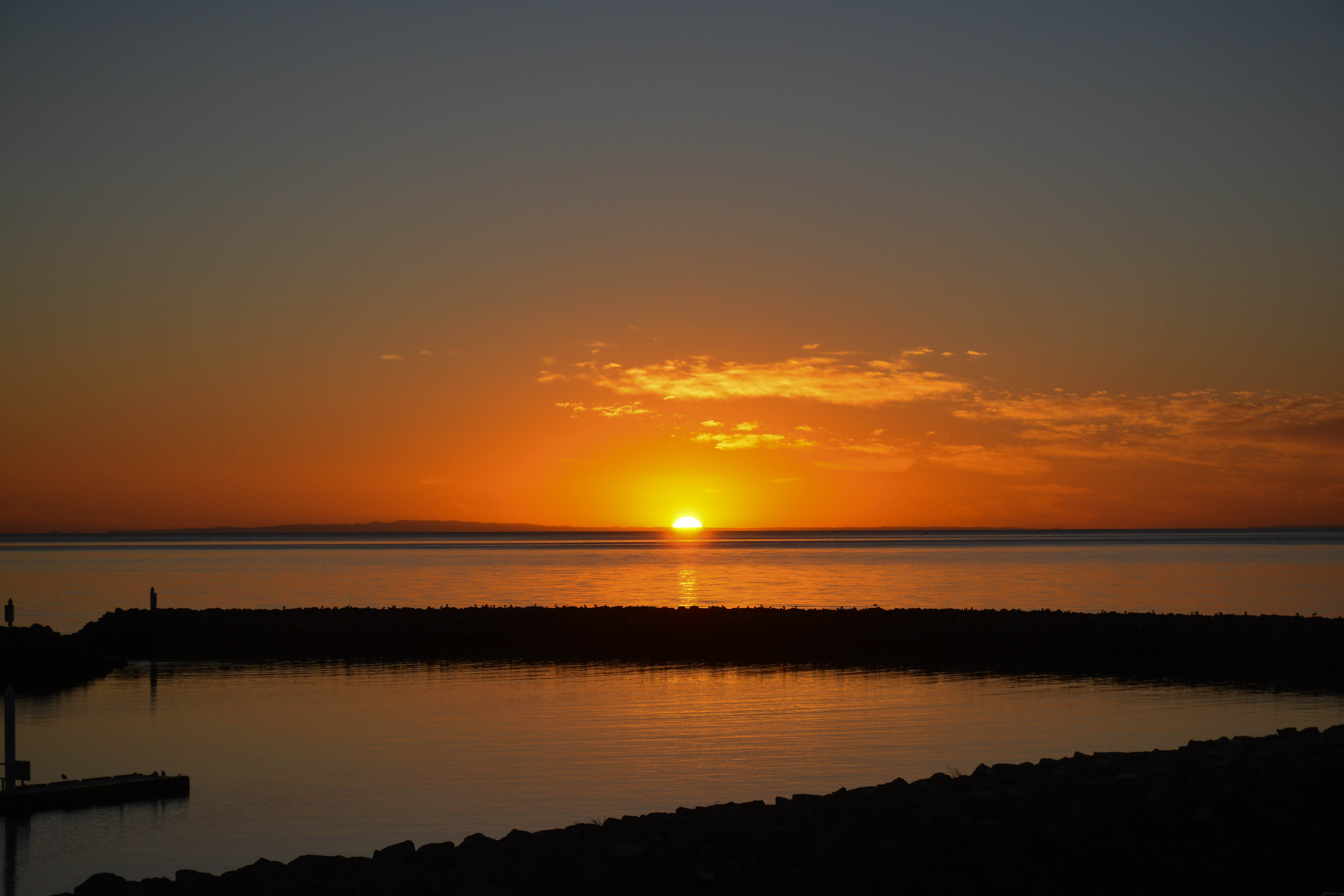
Sunrise over the boat harbour

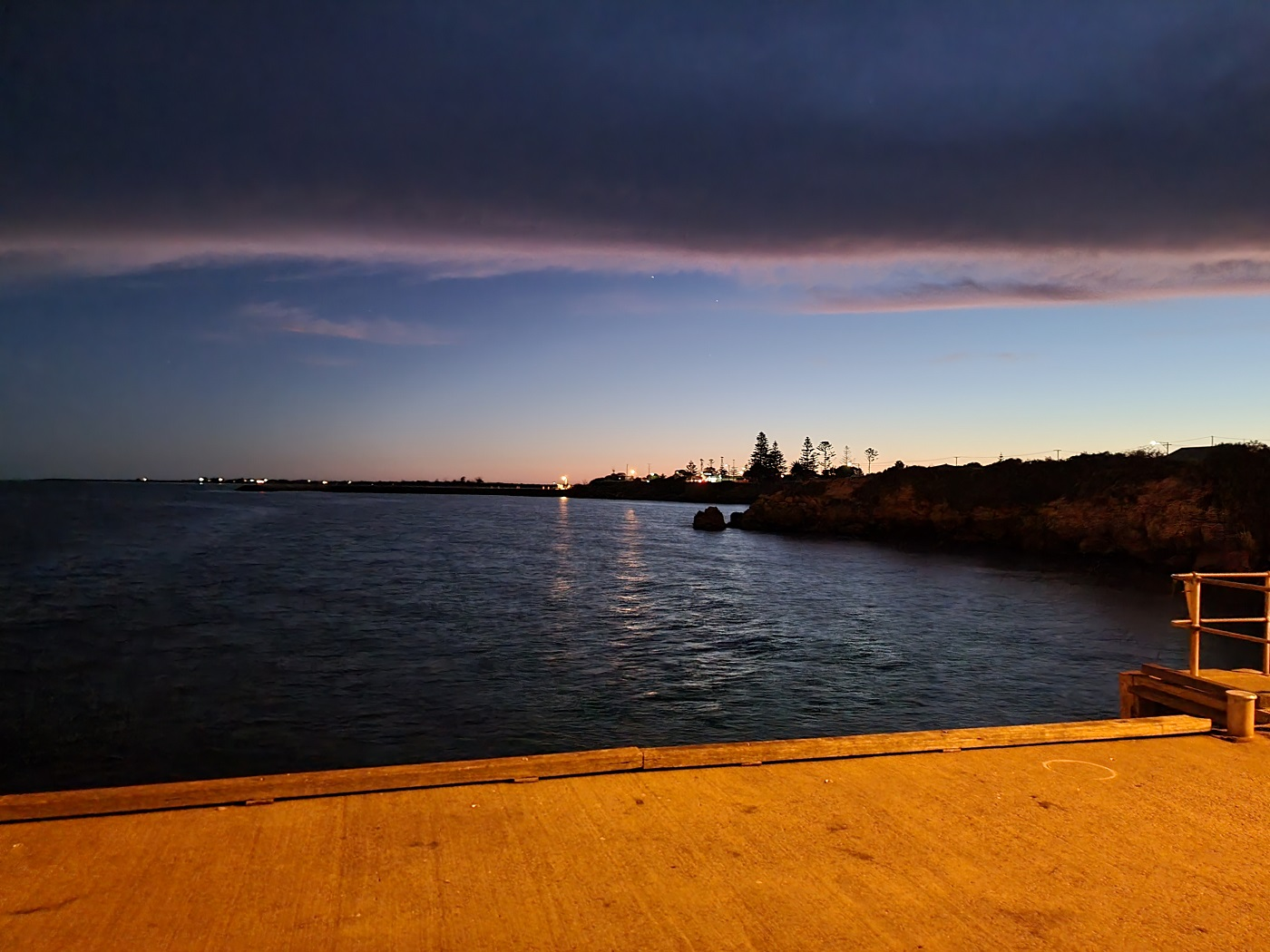
Edithburgh coastline at sunset

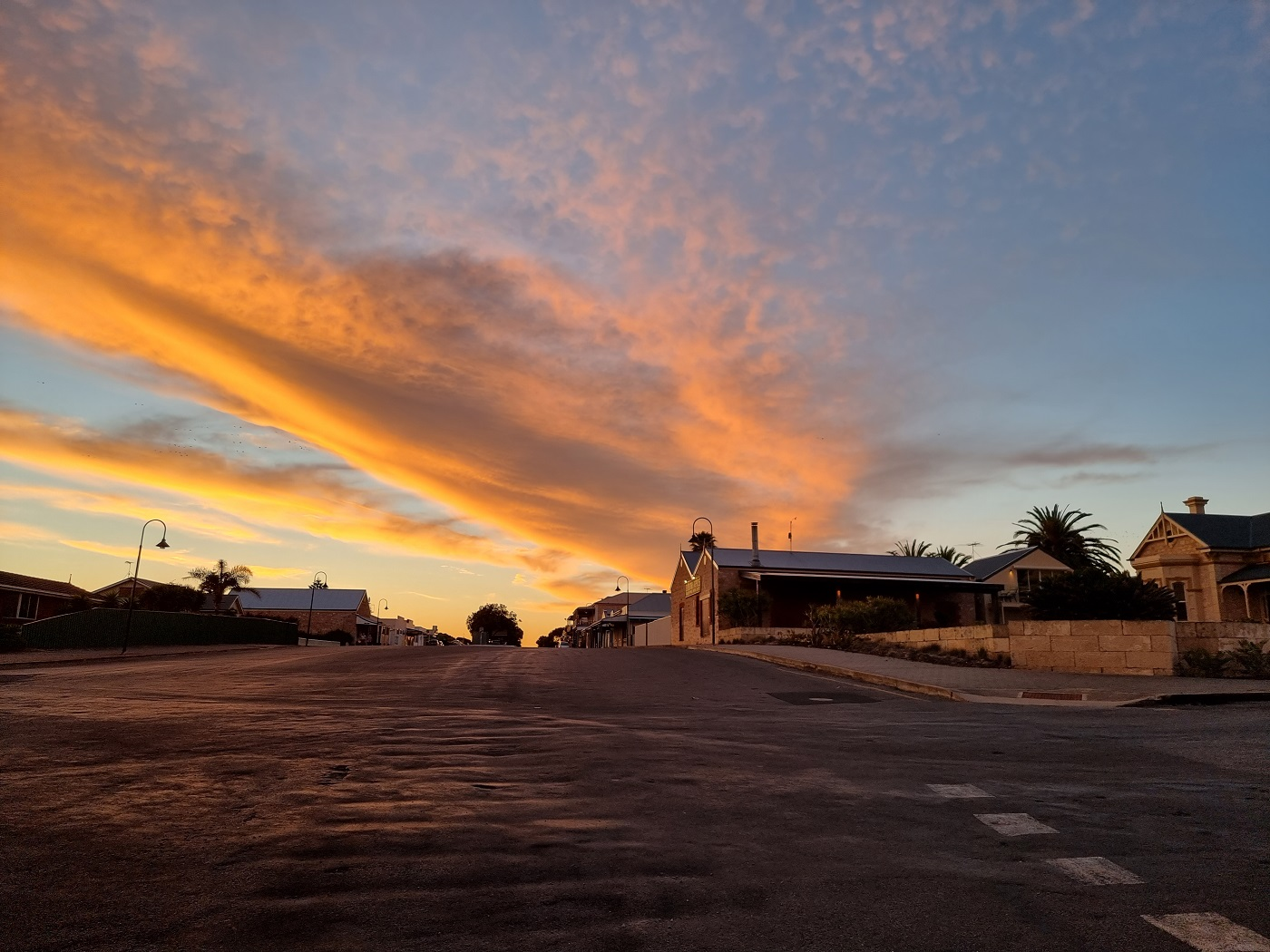
Edith St at sunset, looking from the jetty

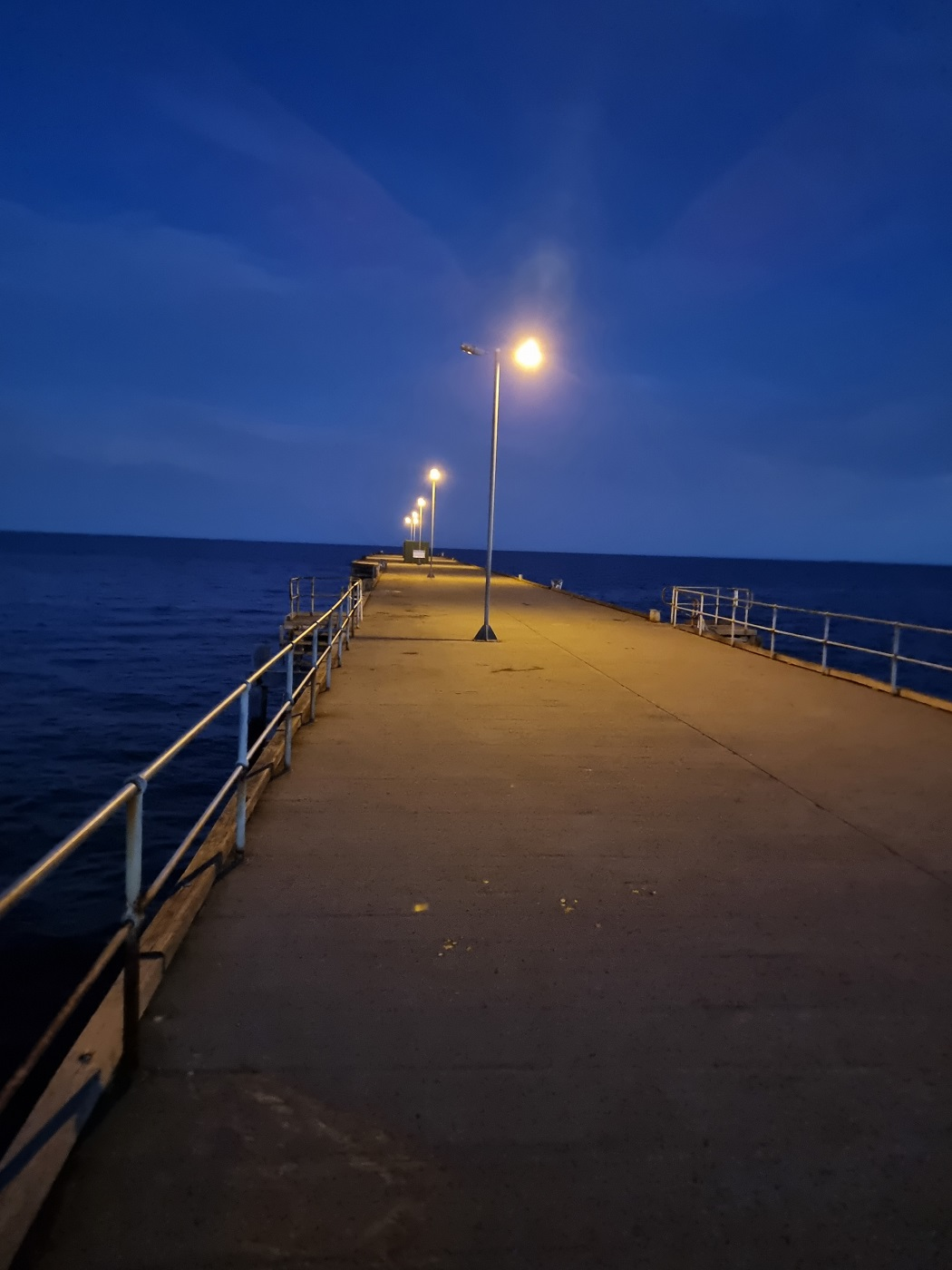
Edithburgh jetty at night

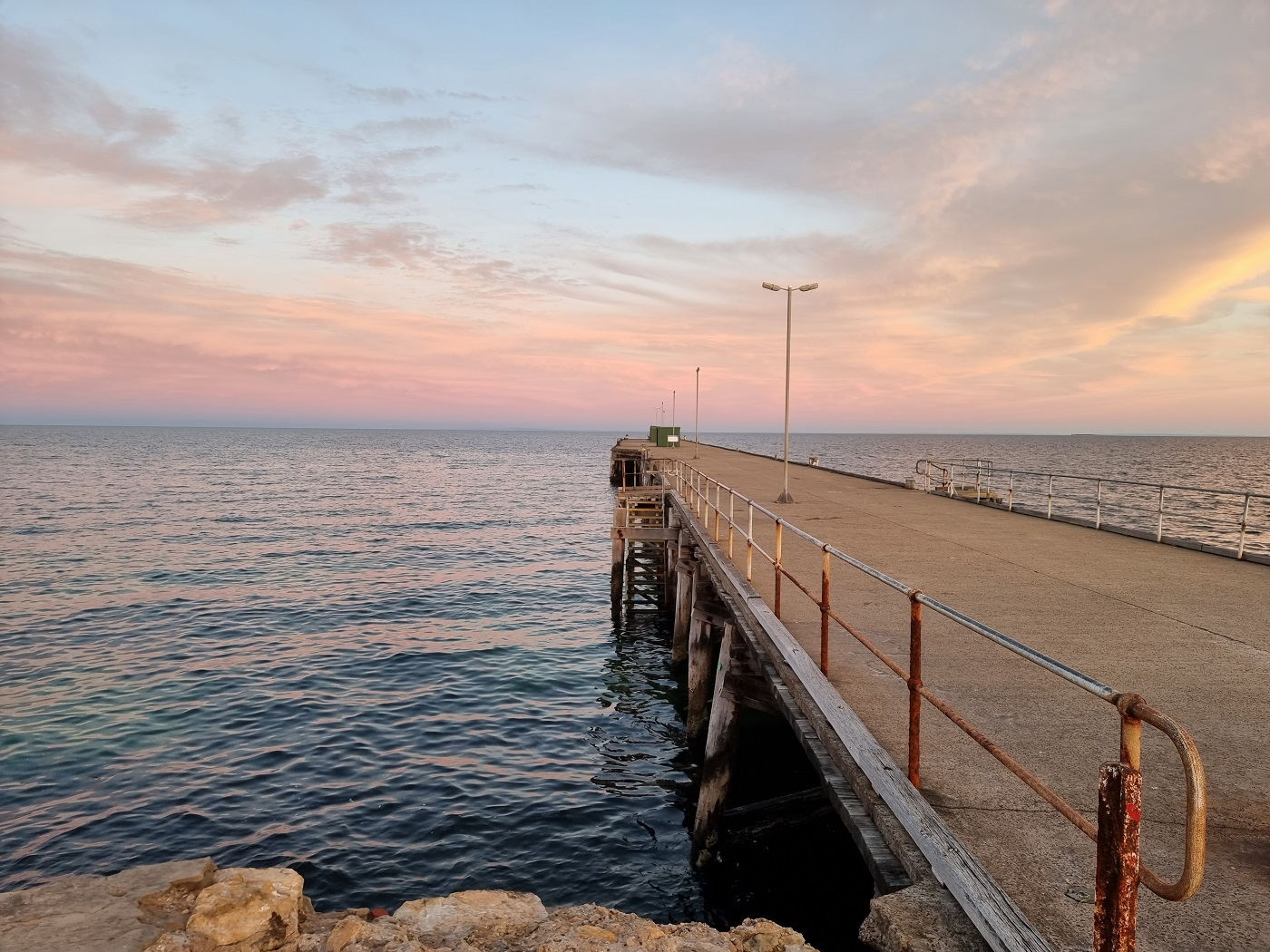
Edithburgh jetty approaching sunset

== People ==
- Jamie Tape - AFL footballer

== Climate ==
Climate data for Edithburgh, elevation 6 m (20 ft), (1993–2020 normals, extremes 1984–present)
Month	Jan	Feb	Mar	Apr	May	Jun	Jul	Aug	Sep	Oct	Nov	Dec	Year
Record high °C (°F)	47.9 (118.2)	43.6 (110.5)	41.7 (107.1)	37.9 (100.2)	33.0 (91.4)	24.7 (76.5)	23.7 (74.7)	29.7 (85.5)	34.5 (94.1)	38.2 (100.8)	46.3 (115.3)	47.0 (116.6)	47.9 (118.2)
Mean daily maximum °C (°F)	25.5 (77.9)	25.1 (77.2)	23.6 (74.5)	21.3 (70.3)	18.5 (65.3)	15.9 (60.6)	15.1 (59.2)	15.8 (60.4)	17.8 (64.0)	20.5 (68.9)	22.7 (72.9)	24.1 (75.4)	20.5 (68.9)
Mean daily minimum °C (°F)	16.8 (62.2)	17.1 (62.8)	15.7 (60.3)	13.1 (55.6)	10.8 (51.4)	8.8 (47.8)	7.4 (45.3)	7.3 (45.1)	8.6 (47.5)	10.8 (51.4)	13.3 (55.9)	14.9 (58.8)	12.1 (53.8)
Record low °C (°F)	8.3 (46.9)	7.8 (46.0)	6.8 (44.2)	4.2 (39.6)	2.6 (36.7)	−0.5 (31.1)	0.0 (32.0)	0.8 (33.4)	0.6 (33.1)	0.5 (32.9)	3.5 (38.3)	5.3 (41.5)	−0.5 (31.1)
Average precipitation mm (inches)	13.4 (0.53)	18.8 (0.74)	16.6 (0.65)	25.4 (1.00)	44.9 (1.77)	54.6 (2.15)	48.3 (1.90)	47.2 (1.86)	44.1 (1.74)	28.1 (1.11)	17.6 (0.69)	15.7 (0.62)	375.2 (14.77)
Average precipitation days (≥ 0.2 mm)	4.2	3.9	5.3	8.6	13.8	15.7	17.2	17.2	14.1	9.6	6.9	5.9	122.4
Average afternoon relative humidity (%)	52	53	53	54	62	67	67	64	61	55	53	49	58
Source: Australian Bureau of Meteorology (humidity 1992–2010)

== See also ==
- List of cities and towns in South Australia
